= List of châteaux in Brittany =

This article is a list of châteaux in Brittany, France.

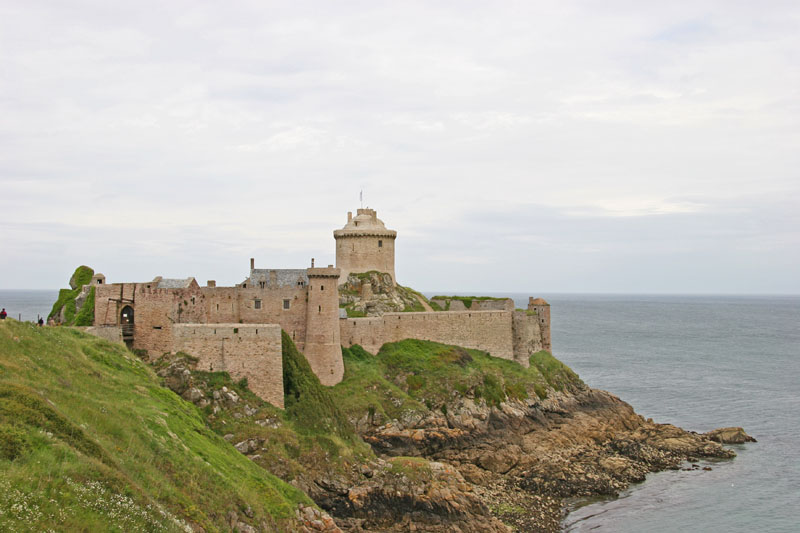
Fort-la-Latte

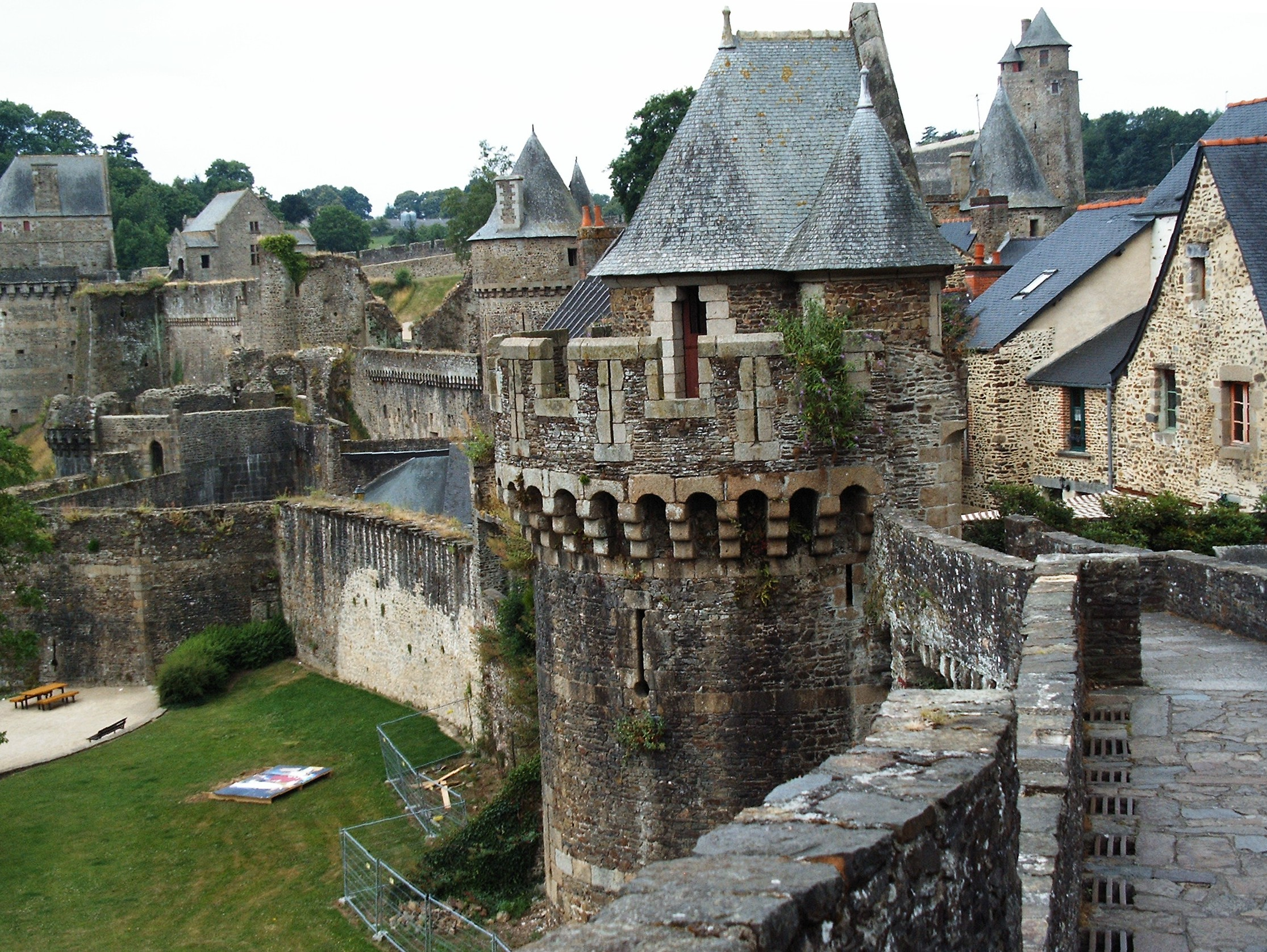
Ruins of the Château de Fougères

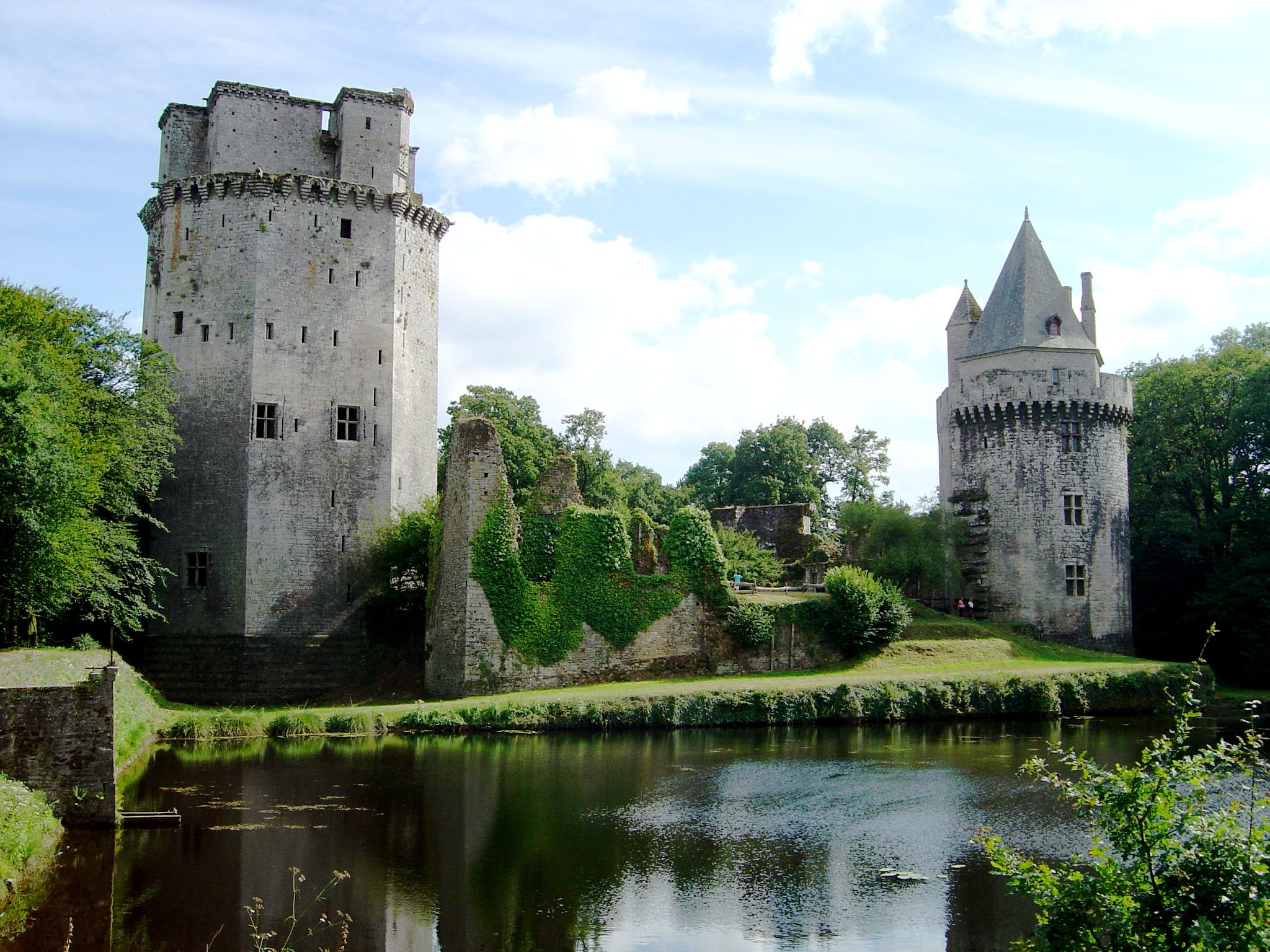
Château de Largoët

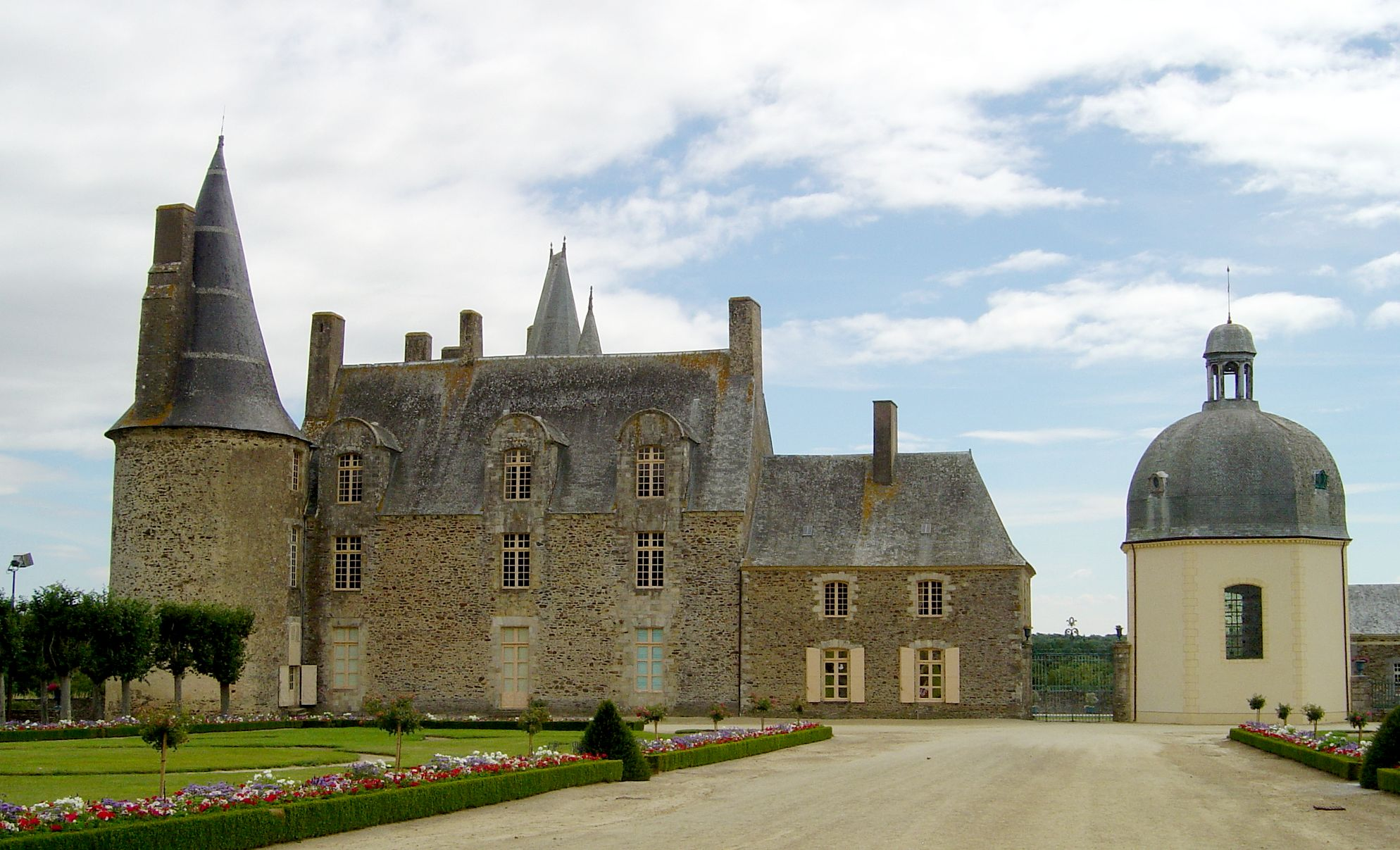
Château des Rochers-Sévigné

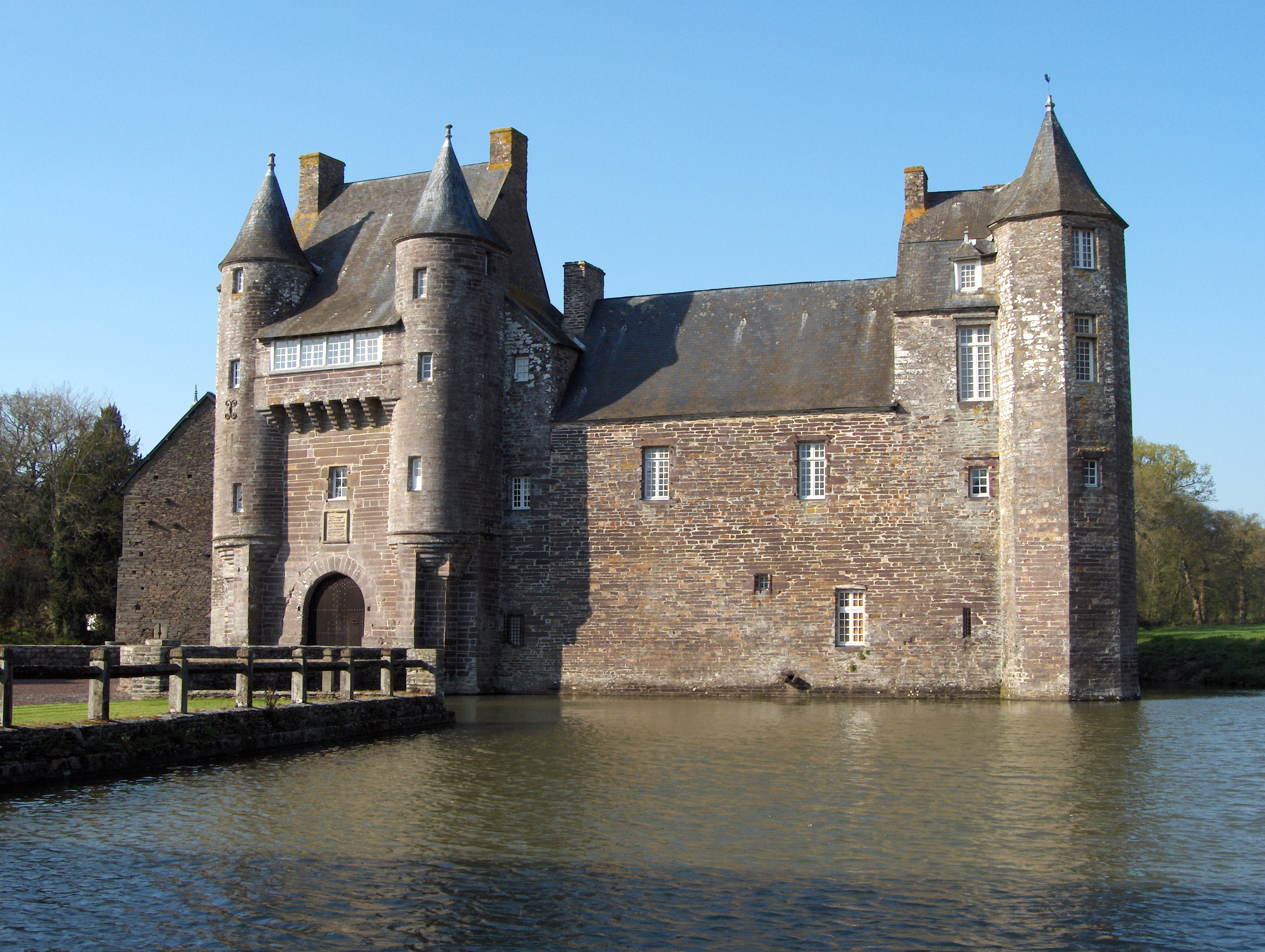
Château de Trécesson

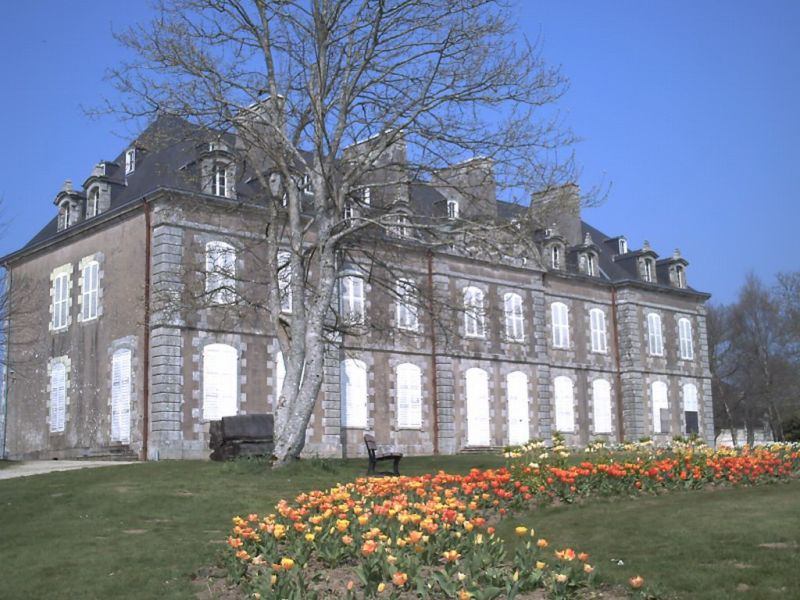
Château de Manéhouarn

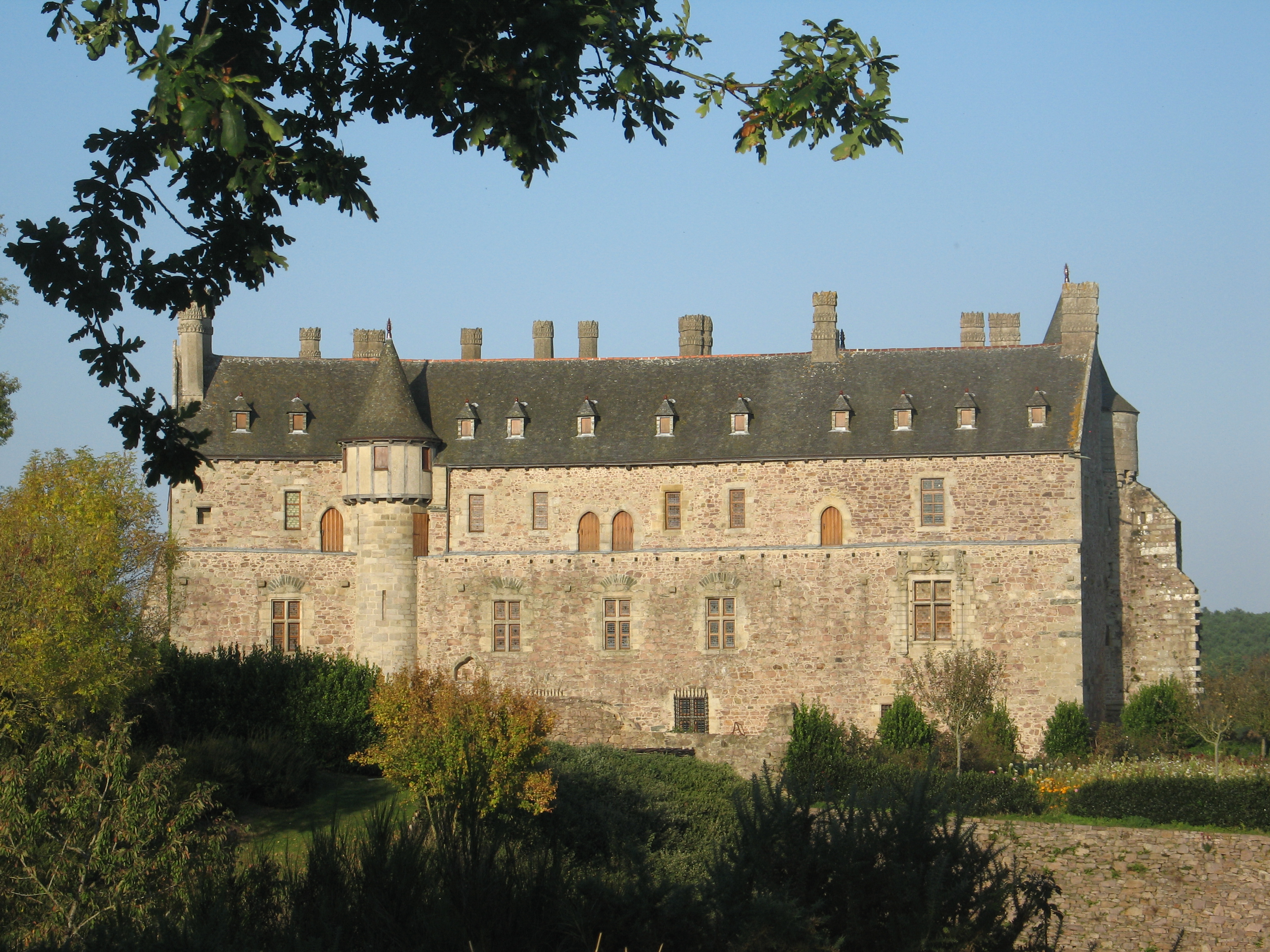
Château de la Roche-Jagu

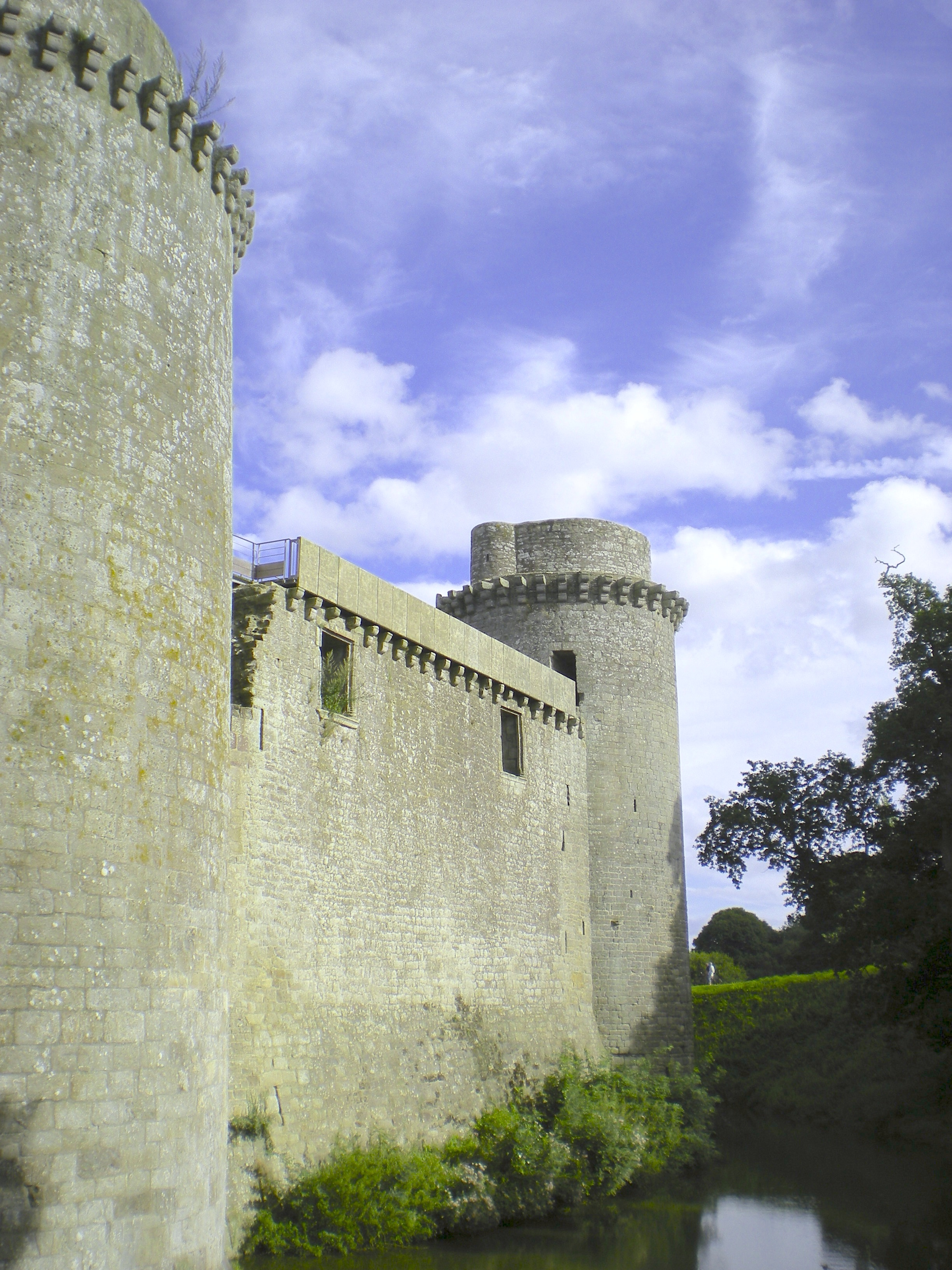
Château de la Hunaudaye

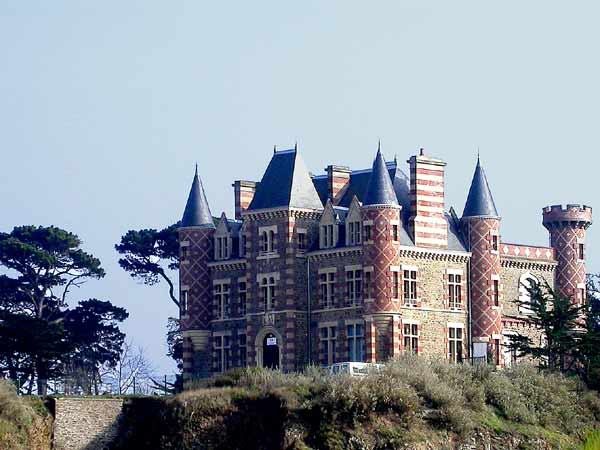
Château du Nessay

== Côtes-d'Armor ==
Former Duchy of Brittany, Departement 22.

- Château de Bienassis, 15th and 16th centuries at Erquy. Park and gardens. Classified as a Historic Monument.
- Château de Caradeuc, at Plouasne
- Château de La Caunelaye, at Corseul
- Château de Coat-an-noz, at Belle-Isle-en-Terre
- Château de Costaérès, at Trégastel
- Château de Dinan, at Dinan. Musée. Classified as a Historic Monument.
- Fort-la-Latte, at Plévenon, Mediaeval fort rebuilt by Vauban. Classified as a Historic Monument.
- Château de Guingamp, at Guingamp
- Château de La Guyomarais, at Saint-Denoual
- Château de Hac, at Quiou. Classified as a Historic Monument.
- Château de la Hunaudaye, at Plédéliac. Classified as a Historic Monument.
- Château de Lorge, at L'Hermitage-Lorge. Listed as an Historic Monument.
- Château de Montafilant, 13th century, at Corseul. Listed as an Historic Monument.
- Château de Monterfil, at Corseul (site gallo-romain). Listed as an Historic Monument.
- Château de la Motte-Broons, at Broons (no visible remains)
- Château du Plessis-Madeuc, 17th century, at Corseul
- Château de Quintin, à Quintin. Classified as a Historic Monument.
- Château de la Roche-Jagu, at Ploëzal. Classified as a Historic Monument. Noted park and gardens "Jardin remarquable" (remarkable garden).
- Château de Rosanbo, at Lanvellec. Listed as an Historic Monument.
- Château des Salles, at Guingamp
- Château de la Tandourie, 16th century, at Corseul
- Château de Tonquédec, at Tonquédec. (ruin) Classified as a Historic Monument.
- Château de Vaulembert, at Corseul
- Manoir de Vaumadeuc, 15th century, at Pléven. Breton Renaissance. Listed as an Historic Monument.
- Château de la Villeneuve, 17th century, at Lanmodez
- Château du Guildo at Créhen. (ruin)

== Finistère ==
Former Duchy of Brittany, Departement 29.

- Fort de Bertheaume, at Plougonvelin
- Château de Bodinio at Clohars-Fouesnant
- Château de Brest, at Brest
- Château de Châteaulin, at Châteaulin (ruin)
- Château de Châteauneuf-du-Faou, at Châteauneuf-du-Faou (ruin)
- Château de Cheffontaines, at Clohars-Fouesnant
- Ville close de Concarneau, at Concarneau
- Château de Guilguiffin, at Landudec
- Château de Joyeuse Garde, at La Forest-Landerneau (ruin)
- Château du Juch, at Juch
- Château de Keraval, at Plomelin
- Manoir de Kerazan, at Loctudy
- Château de Kergos, at Clohars-Fouesnant
- Château de Kergroadès, at Brélès
- Château de Keriolet, at Concarneau
- Château de Kerjean, at Saint-Vougay
- Château de Kerlarec at Arzano.
- Manoir de Kernuz, at Pont-l'Abbé
- Château de Keroual, at Guilers
- Château de Kerouzéré, at Sibiril (ruin)
- Château de Lanniron, at Quimper
- Manoir de Mézarnou, at Plounéventer (being restored)
- Château du Pérennou, at Plomelin
- Château de Pont-L'Abbé, at Pont-l'Abbé
- Château de Quimerc'h (destroyed), at Bannalec
- Château de La Roche-Maurice, at La Roche-Maurice (ruin)
- Château de La Roche-Moisan, at Arzano (ruin)
- Château de Rustéphan, at Pont-Aven (ruin)
- Manoir de Stang-al-lin, at Concarneau
- Château du Taureau, at Carantec, on the bay of Morlaix (castle)
- Château de Trémazan, at Landunvez
- Château de Trévarez, at Saint-Goazec

== Ille-et-Vilaine ==
Former Duchy of Brittany, Departement 35.

- Château de La Ballue, 17th century at Bazouges-la-Pérouse. Noted gardens.
- Château du Bois Cornillé, at Val-d'Izé
- Château du Bois Orcan, at Noyal-sur-Vilaine. Moyen-Âge/Renaissance. Noted park and gardens "Jardin remarquable" (remarkable garden).
- Château de Bonnefontaine, 16th century at Antrain. Breton Renaissance, Park of 25 hectares.
- Château de la Bourbansais, at Pleugueneuc. Zoo, Classified gardens.
- Château de Boutavent, at Iffendic
- Château de Caradeuc, at Bécherel. Park of 40 hectares.
- Château de La Chapelle-Bouëxic, 15th and 17th century at La Chapelle-Bouëxic
- Château de Châteaugiron, at Châteaugiron
- Château de Combourg, XII^{e} et XV^{e}, at Combourg. Cradle of romanticism, Childhood home of François-René de Chateaubriand, Classified park.
- Château de Fougères, at Fougères (castle)
- Manoir de Limoëlou, 16th century at Saint-Malo. Museum of Jacques Cartier.
- Château de Montmarin, 18th century at Pleurtuit. Classified gardens.
- Château de Montmuran, 12th, 14th and 17th century at Iffs. Associated with de Bertrand du Guesclin.
- Château de la Motte-Jean, at Saint-Coulomb
- Fort National, at Saint-Malo (castle)
- Château du Nessay, at Saint-Briac-sur-Mer
- Petit Bé, at Saint-Malo
- Château des Rochers-Sévigné, at Vitré
- Château de Saint-Aubin-du-Cormier, at Saint-Aubin-du-Cormier (ruin)
- Château de Saint-Malo, at Saint-Malo
- Tour Solidor, at Saint-Malo
- Château de la Briantais, at Saint-Malo. Parc.
- Malouinière de la Ville Bague, 18th century at Saint-Coulomb. Park.
- Château de Vitré, at Vitré (castle)

== Loire-Atlantique ==
Former Duchy of Brittany, Departement 44.

- Château des ducs de Bretagne (the Palace of the Dukes of Brittany) at Nantes
- Château de Blain, at Blain (castle)
- Château de Bois-Briand, at Nantes
- Château de la Bretesche, at Missillac
- Château de Careil, at Guérande
- Château de Chassay, at Sainte-Luce-sur-Loire
- Château de Châteaubriant, at Châteaubriant (castle)
- Château de Clermont, at Cellier
- Château de Clisson, at Clisson (castle)
- Château de la Motte-Glain, at La Chapelle-Glain
- Château de l'Oiselinière, at Gorges
- Château de la Pinelais, at Saint-Père-en-Retz
- Château de Pornic, at Pornic
- Château de Ranrouët, at Herbignac (castle)
- Château de la Seilleraye, at Carquefou
- See also List of châteaux in the Pays-de-la-Loire

== Morbihan ==
Former Duchy of Brittany, Departement 56.

Château	Town	Date of construction	Period or Style	Notes
Citadelle de Belle-Île-en-Mer	Le Palais	1549	Louis XIV	
Château de Comper	Concoret		Mediaeval	ruined castle
Logis Crawford	Sauzon	18th century		Built by Louis XV after the restitution of Belle-Isle for the English Governor in thanks for his conduct towards Louis's subjects.
Château du Crévy	La Chapelle-Caro			
Château des Ducs de Rohan	Pontivy			
Château Fouquet	Le Palais	commenced 17th century		castle
Château Gaillard	Vannes	1410		Ancien Hôtel du Parlement de Bretagne
Château de la Grée de Callac	Monteneuf / Augan	1892		
Château de l'Hermine	Vannes	1785		Former residence of the Dukes of Brittany
Château de Josselin	Josselin			Renaissance, castle
Château de Kerguéhennec	Bignan			
Château de Kerlivio	Brandérion			
Château de Kermadio	Pluneret			
Château de Largoët	Elven			castle
Château de Manéhouarn	Plouay			
Château du Plessis-Josso	Theix			
Château de Séréac	Muzillac			
Château de Suscinio	Sarzeau			Former residence of the Dukes of Brittany
Château de Trécesson	Campénéac			
Château de Trédion	Trédion	1350	Renaissance	Former residence of the Dukes of Brittany.
Château de Turpault	Quiberon			

== See also ==
- List of châteaux in Loire-Atlantique
- List of castles in France
