= Orientation of churches =

Church architecture topic

Cathedral oriented to the east. The arrow indicates the west front entrance.

The orientation of a building refers to the direction in which it is constructed and laid out, taking account of its planned purpose and ease of use for its occupants, its relation to the path of the sun and other aspects of its environment. In church architecture, orientation is an arrangement by which the point of main interest in the interior is towards the east (Latin: oriens). The east end is where the altar is placed, often within an apse. The façade and main entrance are accordingly at the west end.

The opposite arrangement, in which the church is entered from the east and the sanctuary is at the other end, is called occidentation.

Most churches built since the eighth century are oriented. In the many churches where the altar end is not actually the east end of the structure, terms such as "east end", "west door", "north aisle" are commonly used as if the church were oriented, treating the altar end as the liturgical east.

== History ==
Many early Christians faced east when praying. Due to this established custom, Tertullian says some non-Christians thought they worshipped the sun. Origen says: "The fact that ... of all the quarters of the heavens, the east is the only direction we turn to when we pour out prayer, the reasons for this, I think, are not easily discovered by anyone." Later on, various Church Fathers advanced mystical reasons for the custom. One such explanation is that Christ's Second Coming was expected to be from the east, substantiated using the verse from the Gospel of Matthew: "For as the lightning comes from the east and shines as far as the west, so will be the coming of the Son of Man" (Matthew 24:27).

At first, the orientation of the building in which Christians met was unimportant, but after the legalization of the religion by the Roman Empire in the fourth century, customs developed in this regard. These differed in Eastern and Western Christianity.

The Apostolic Constitutions, a work of Eastern Christianity written between AD 375 and 380, gave it as a rule that churches should have the sanctuary (with apse and sacristies) at the east end, to enable Christians to pray eastward in church as in private or in small groups. In the middle of the sanctuary was the altar, behind which was the bishop's throne, flanked by the seats of the presbyters, while the laity were on the opposite side. However, even in the East there were churches (for example, in Tyre, Lebanon) that had the entrance at the east end, and the sanctuary at the west end. During the readings all looked towards the readers, the bishop and presbyters looking westward, the people eastward. The Apostolic Constitutions, like the other documents that speak of the custom of praying towards the east, do not indicate on which side of the altar the bishop stood for "the sacrifice".

The earliest Christian churches in Rome were all built with the entrance on the opposite side: to the east, like the Jewish temple in Jerusalem. Only in the 8th or 9th century did Rome accept the orientation that had become obligatory in the Byzantine Empire and was also generally adopted in the Frankish Empire and elsewhere in western and northern Europe. The original Constantinian Church of the Holy Sepulchre in Jerusalem also had the altar in the west end.

The old Roman custom of having the altar at the west end and the entrance at the east was sometimes followed as late as the 11th century even in areas under Frankish rule, as seen in Petershausen (Constance), Bamberg Cathedral, Augsburg Cathedral, Regensburg Cathedral, and Hildesheim Cathedral (all in present-day Germany).

The importance attached to orientation of churches declined in Europe after the 15th century. In his instructions on the building and arrangement of churches, Charles Borromeo, archbishop of Milan from 1560 to 1584, expressed a preference for having the apse point exactly east, but accepted that, where that is impractical, a church could be built even on a north–south axis, preferably with the façade at the southern end. He stated that the altar can also be at the west end, where "in accordance with the rite of the Church it is customary for Mass to be celebrated at the main altar by a priest facing the people".

The medieval mendicant orders generally built their churches inside towns and had to fit them into the town plans, regardless of orientation. Later, in the Spanish and Portuguese colonial empires they made no attempt to observe orientation, as is seen in San Francisco de Asis Mission Church near Taos, New Mexico. Today in the West, orientation is little observed in building churches, even by the Catholic church, and still less by Protestant denominations.

== Inexactitude of orientation ==
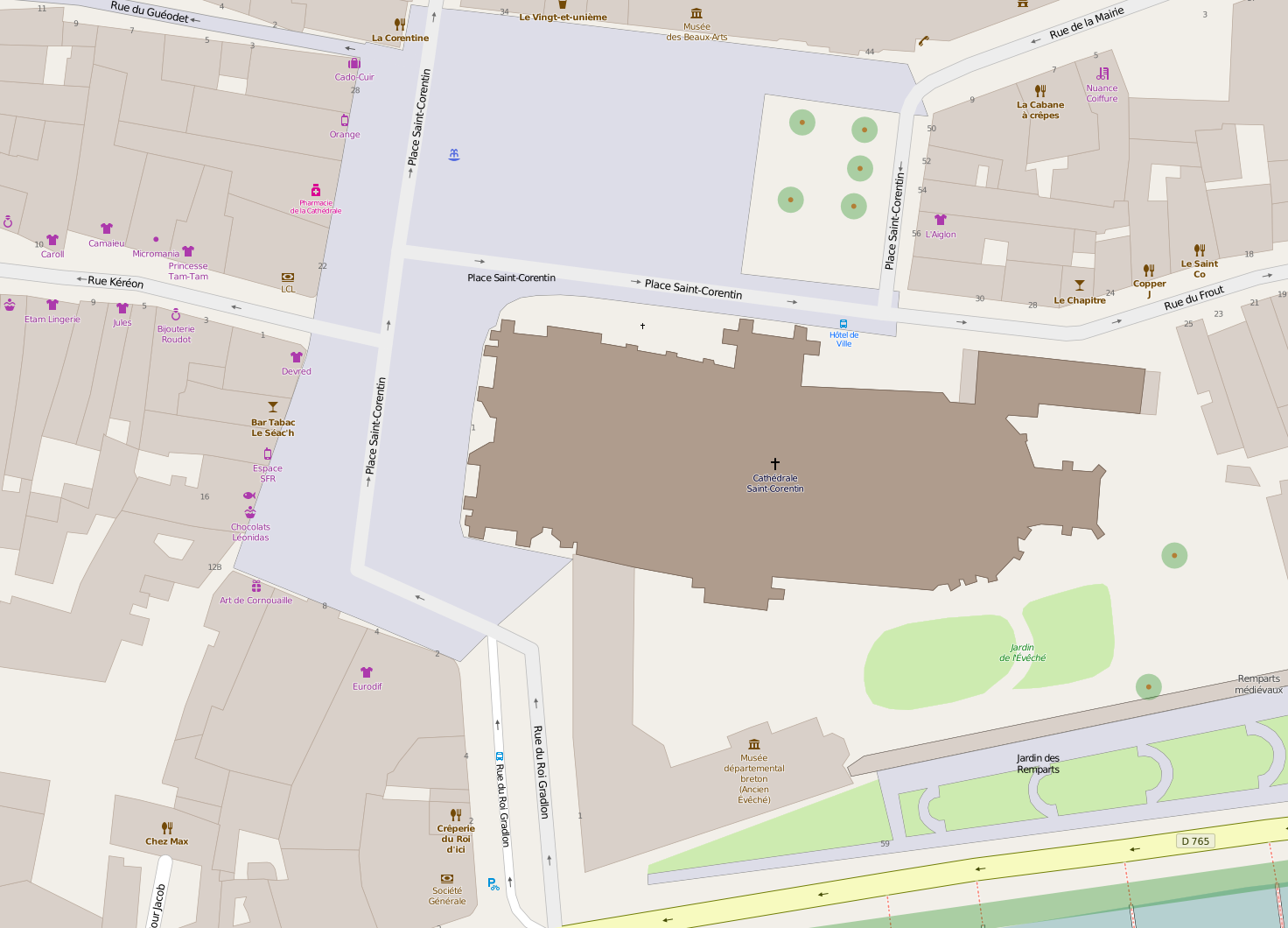
Quimper Cathedral orientation, Finistère, France

Borromeo stated that churches ought to be oriented exactly east, in line with the rising sun at the equinoxes, not at the solstices, but some churches seem to be oriented to sunrise on the feast day of their patron saint. Thus St. Stephen's Cathedral, Vienna is oriented in line with sunrise on Saint Stephen's Day, 26 December, in Julian calendar 1137, when it began to be built. However, a survey of old English churches published in 2006 showed practically no relationship with the feast days of the saints to whom they are dedicated. The results also did not conform to a theory that compass readings could have caused the variants. Taken as a body, those churches can only be said to have been oriented approximately but not exactly to the geographical east.

Another survey of a smaller number of English churches examined other possible alignments also and found that, if sunset as well as sunrise is taken into account, the saint's day hypothesis covered 43% of the cases considered, and that there was a significant correspondence also with sunrise on Easter morning of the year of foundation. The results provided no support for the compass readings hypothesis.

Yet another study of English churches found that a significant proportion of churches that showed a considerable deviation from true east were constrained by neighbouring buildings in town and perhaps by site topography in rural areas.

Similarly, a survey of a total of 32 medieval churches with reliable metadata in Lower Austria and northern Germany discovered only a few aligned in accordance with the saint's feast, with no general trend. There was no evidence of the use of compasses; and there was a preferred alignment towards true east, with variations due to town and natural topography.

A notable example of an (approximately) oriented church building that – to match the contours of its location and to avoid an area that was swampy at the time of its construction – bends slightly in the middle is Quimper Cathedral in Brittany.

Also the modern Coventry Cathedral faces north–south, perpendicular to the old cathedral that was bombed by the Luftwaffe during the blitz. The porch over the main entrance extends over the old wall and, while not connected to the original building does make a nod towards continuity of the structure.

== See also ==
- Ad orientem
- Direction of prayer
