= Joseph Bigot =

French architect

- Born: December 21, 1807; Quimper
- Died: September 4, 1894 (aged 86); Quimper
- Occupation: Architect
- Awards: Knight of the Legion of Honour; Knight of the Order of St. Gregory the Great
- Buildings: Château de Keriolet; Église paroissiale Saint-Marc de Trégunc; Église Saint-Pierre d'Hanvec; Quimper Cathedral (Spire)

Joseph Bigot (French: [ʒozɛf biɡo]) was a French architect. He was a local councillor of Quimper from 1870 till 1878. He built and renovated a number of very important of monuments in Finistère, especially religious constructions.

== Architectural work ==
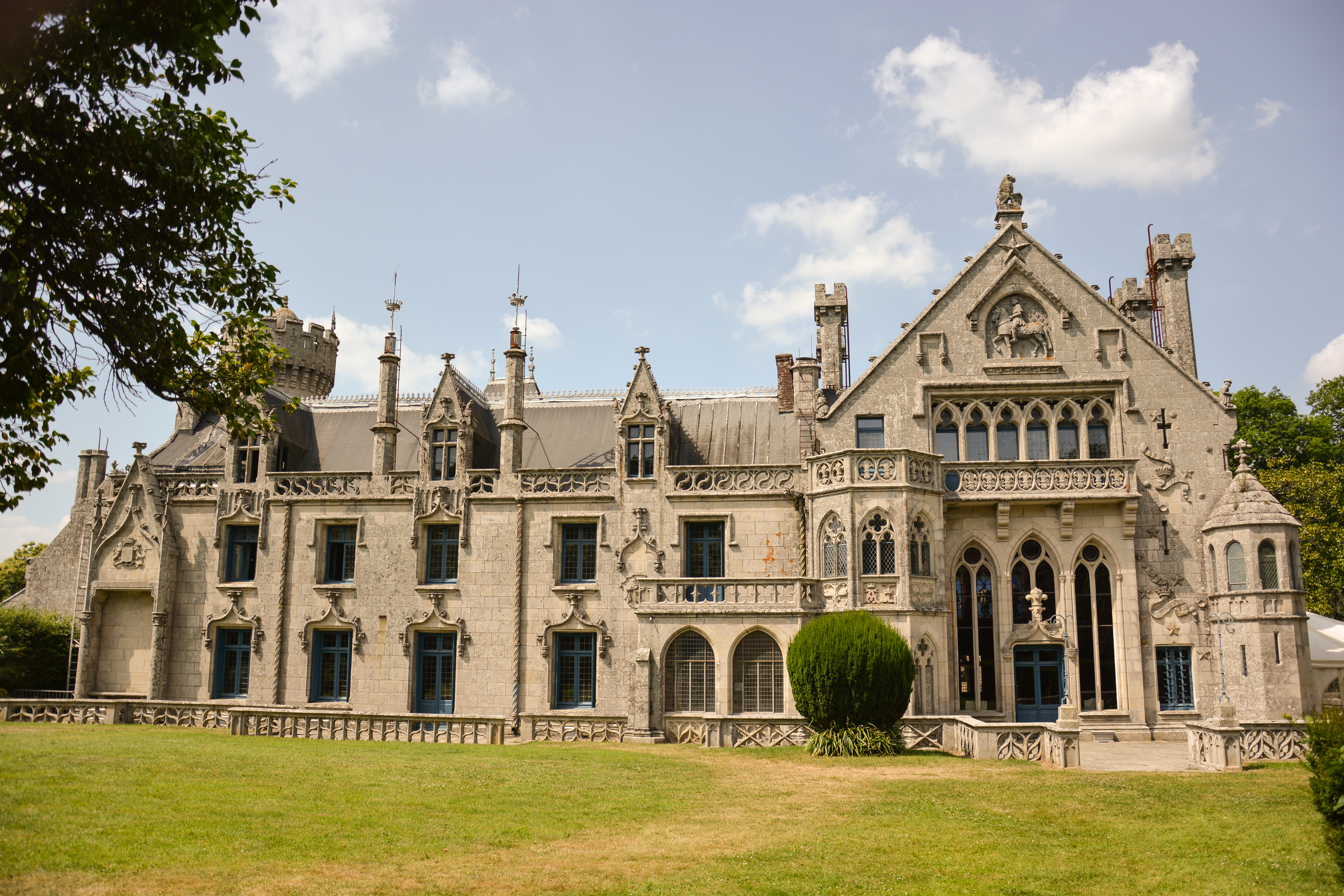
The Château de Keriolet.

- St Joseph's Church, Pont-Aven
- Execution of restoration works in the Sainte-Croix de Quimperlé Abbey in 1864.

== See also ==
- Charles Chaussepied
- Quimper Cathedral

== Bibliography ==
- Patrick Piro (2006). Archiscopie (in French). Institut français d'architecture. ISBN 9782872098439.
- Nolwenn Rannou (2006). Joseph Bigot (1807-1894) - Architecte et restaurateur (in French). rennes: Presses Universitaires de Rennes. ISBN 2-7535-0068-1.
- Emmanuel Salmon-Legagneur (1997). Les noms qui ont fait l'histoire de Bretagne : 1000 noms pour les rues de Bretagne (in French). Spézet: Coop Breizh. ISBN 2-84346-032-8.
