= Manoir de Stang-al-lin =

- Concarneau, France
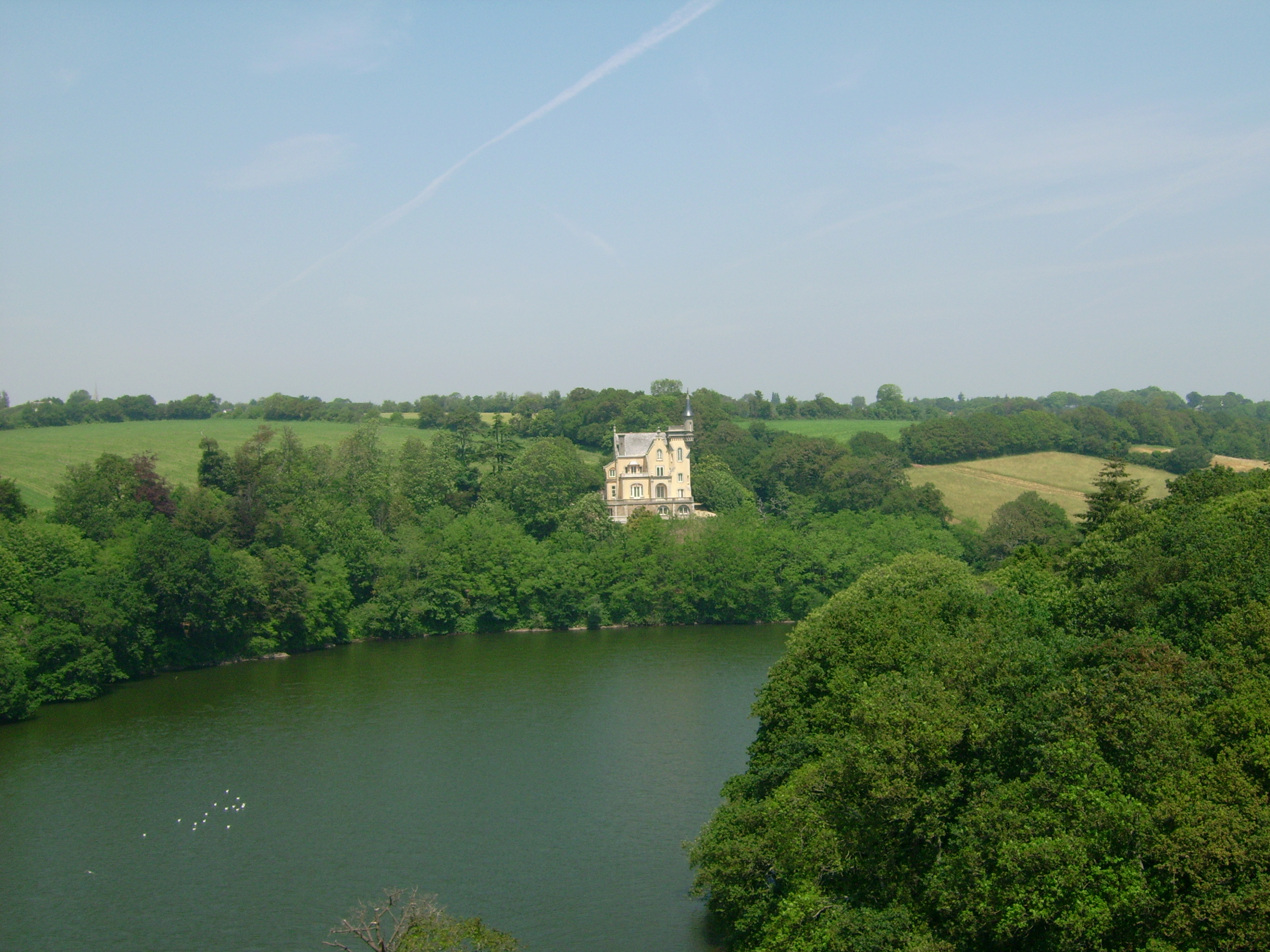

Site information
- Type: Gothic Revival architecture
- Owner: The family Denier
- Open to the public: No

Location
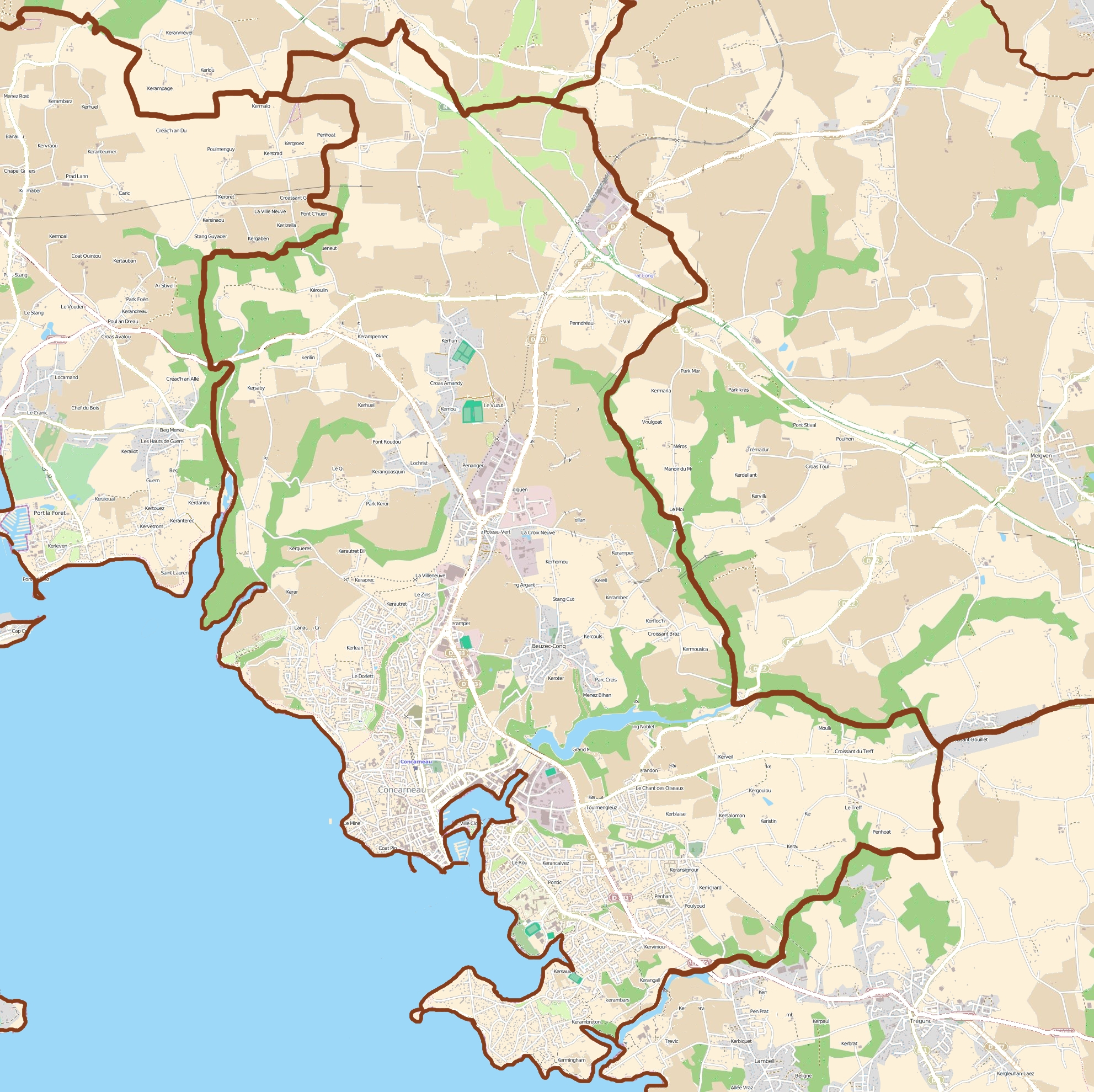
- Coordinates: 47.881389°N 3.902222°W

Site history
- Built: 20th century
- Built by: Gustave Bonduelle

The Manoir de Stang-al-lin is a manor-house located in the Finistère département of Brittany in northwestern France. It is located in the small town of Concarneau, near Quimper. It was erected by Gustave Bonduelle in 1903.

== History ==
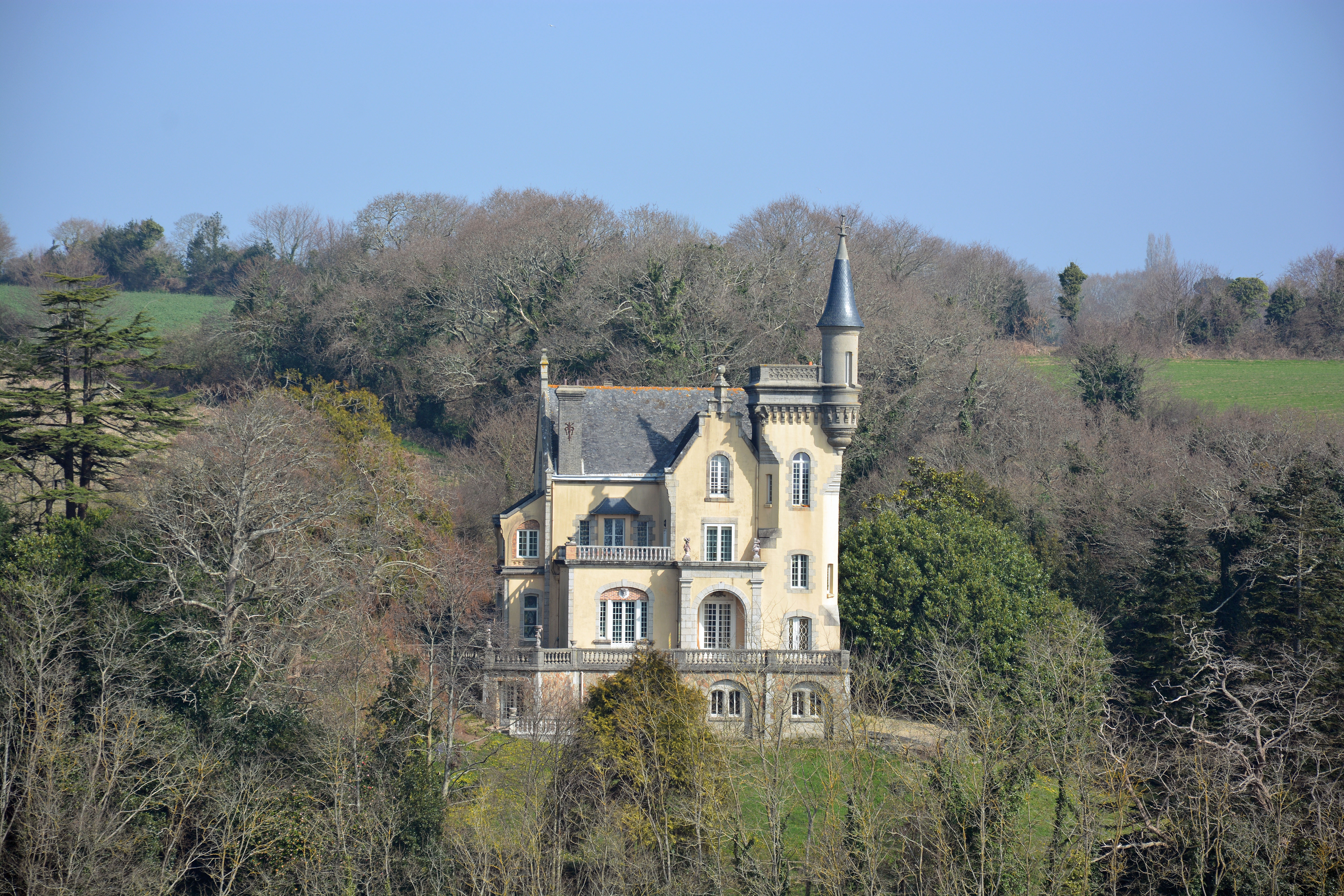
Manoir de Stang-al-lin

The General Counsel of the canton of Concarneau, Gustave Bonduelle buys land in 1902 from the field Keriolet in the town of Beuzec-Conq and there built the following year the manor of Stang-al-Lin. Currently, the manor was owned by the family Denier.

== Architecture ==
The manor was built according to the Gothic Revival architecture.

== See also ==
- Concarneau
- Château de Keriolet
- List of châteaux in Brittany
