= Château de Keriolet =

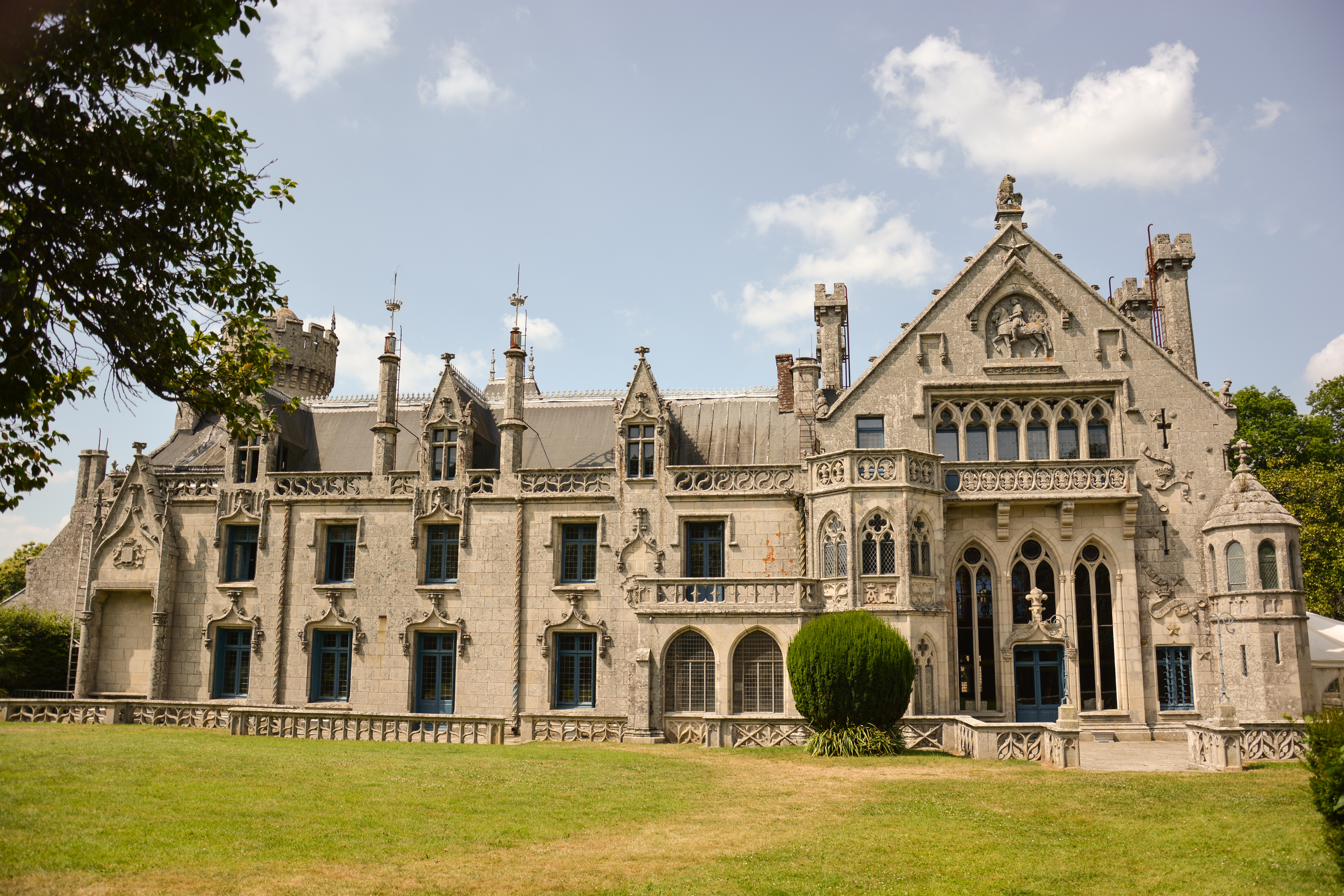

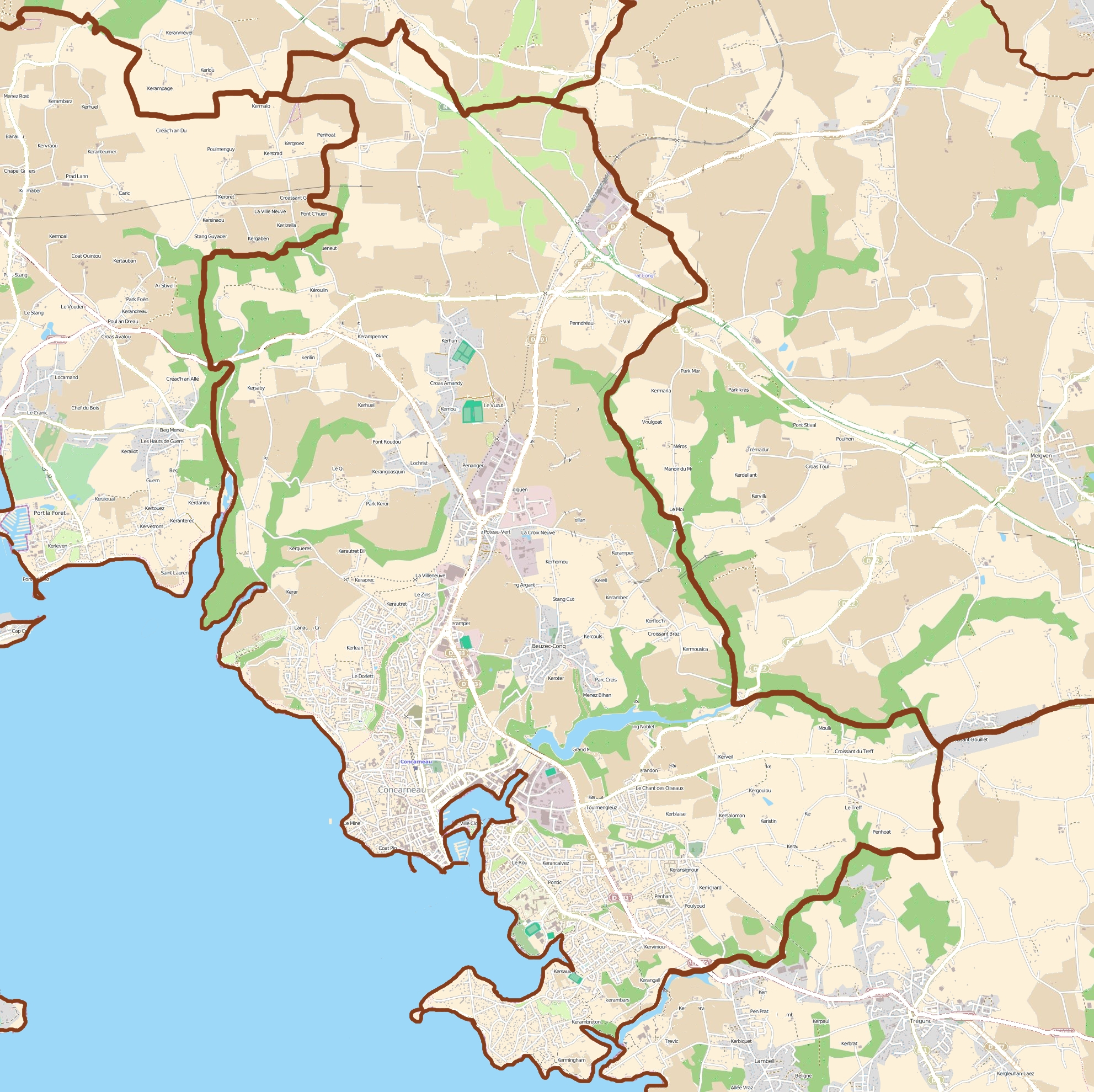
- Location within Concarneau

General information
- Type: Castle
- Architectural style: Gothic Revival architecture
- Location: Concarneau, France
- Coordinates: 47.8865°N 3.9081°W
- Current tenants: Christophe Lévèque
- Construction started: 1863
- Completed: 1883
- Client: Zénaïde Narichkine-Ioussoupov
- Owner: Charles Chauveau

Design and construction
- Architect: Joseph Bigot

Website
- http://www.chateaudekeriolet.com/

The Château de Keriolet is a castle built in the 19th century in Concarneau (France).

== History ==
At the end of 1850s, under the Second French Empire, Louis Charles Honoré de Chauveau (1829-1889) met the Russian princess Zénaïde Yusupov. She was in love with him and bought him a title of Count de Chauveau and Marquis de Serre. The Château de Keriolet was commissioned by Zénaïde Ivanovna Yusupov (Felix Yusupov' great-grandmother), and built at the end of the 19th century by the French architect Joseph Bigot.

In 1889, the Count died from a heart attack aged only 60. He had bequeathed the domain to his sister, Madame Emma Prieur, or to his mistress Jeanne Ducos, with whom he had two children, depending on the source. Whatever the case, Zénaïde bought back Kériolet for 1.5 million francs and decided then to donate it, with her lands and her collections, to the department of Finistère.

In 1956, Felix Yusupov won a lawsuit and regained possession of the castle from the department of Finistère. The castle was sold to the city of Concarneau in 1971. In 1988, Christophe Lévèque acquired the castle, restored it and reopened it to the public.

== Gallery ==
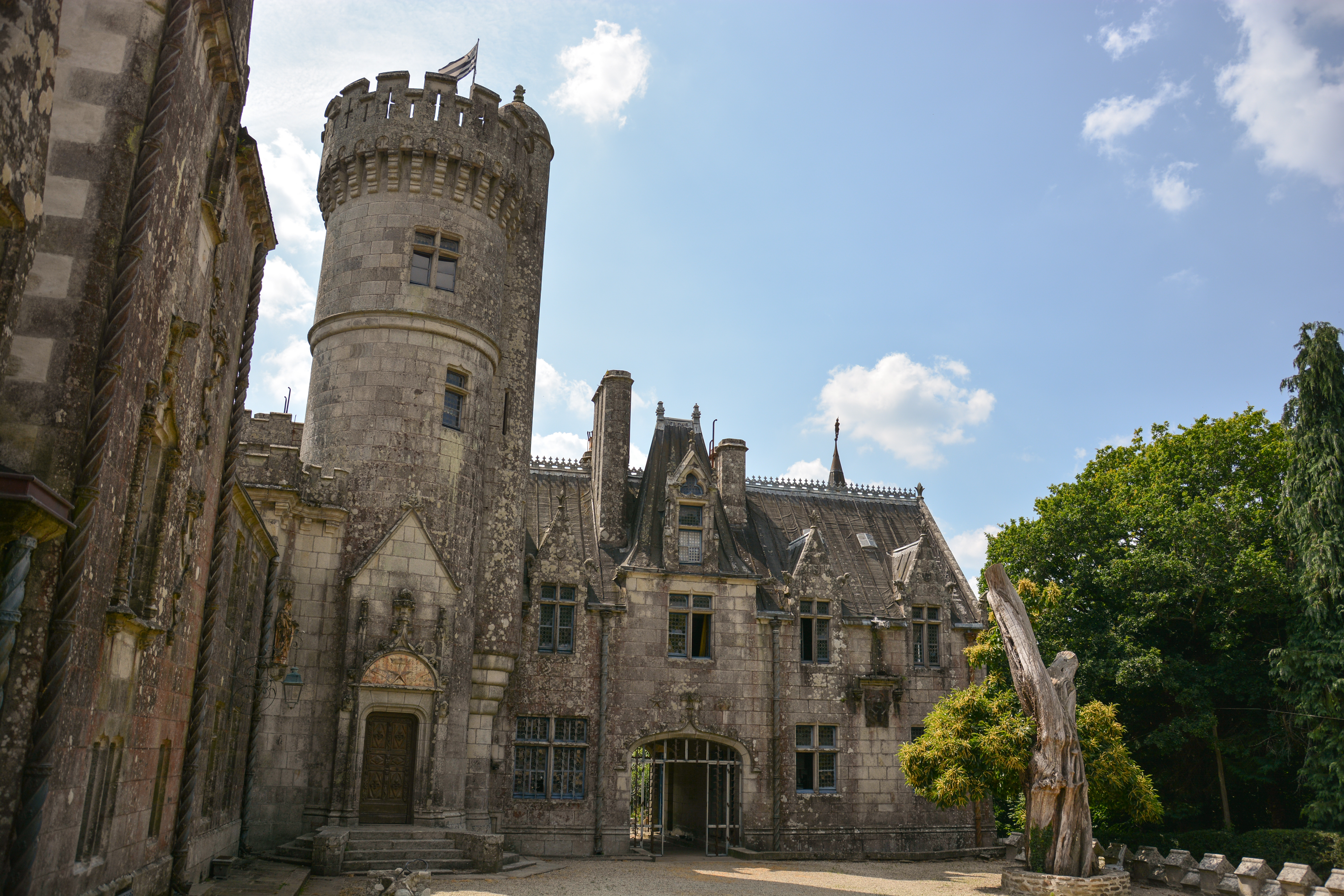

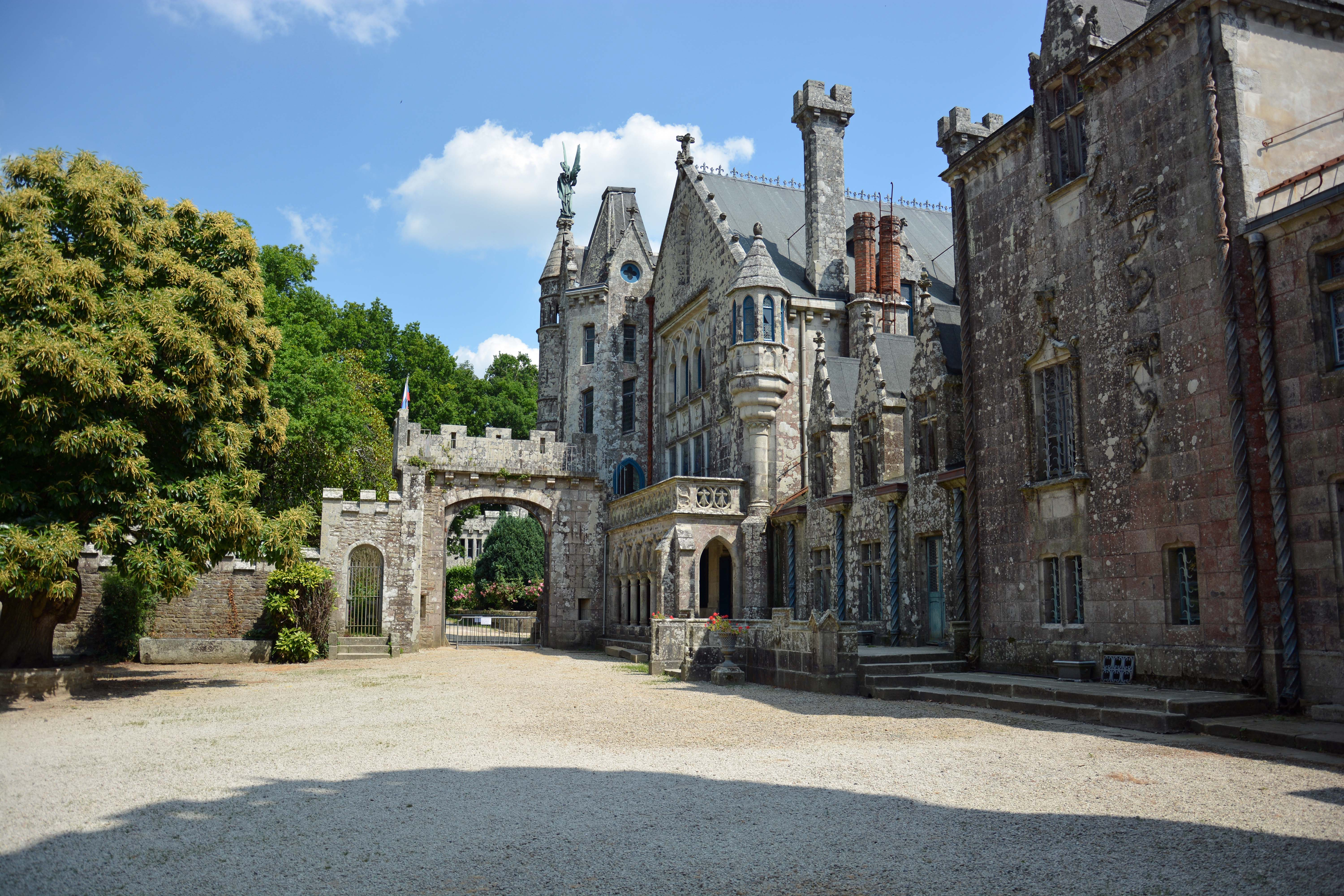

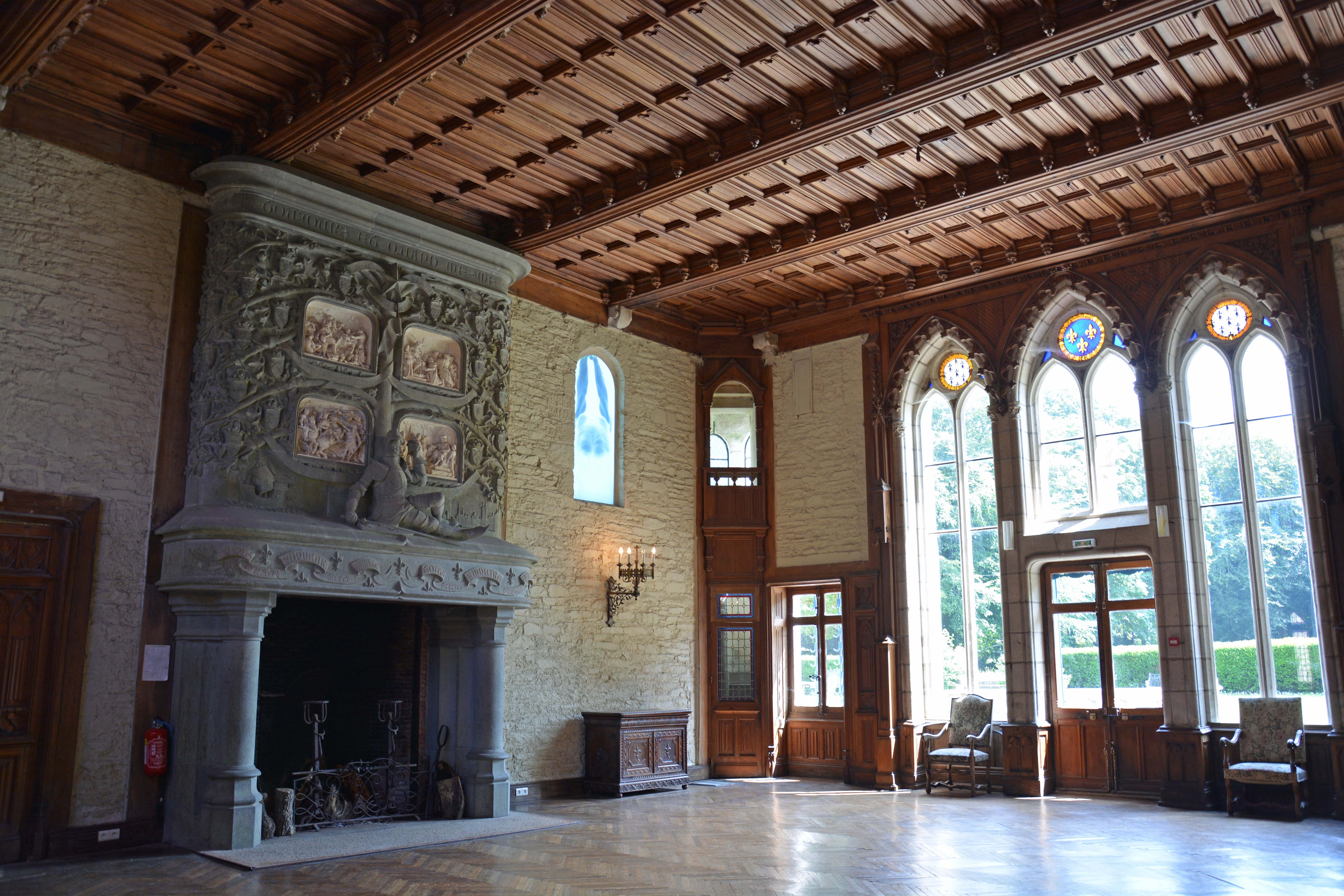

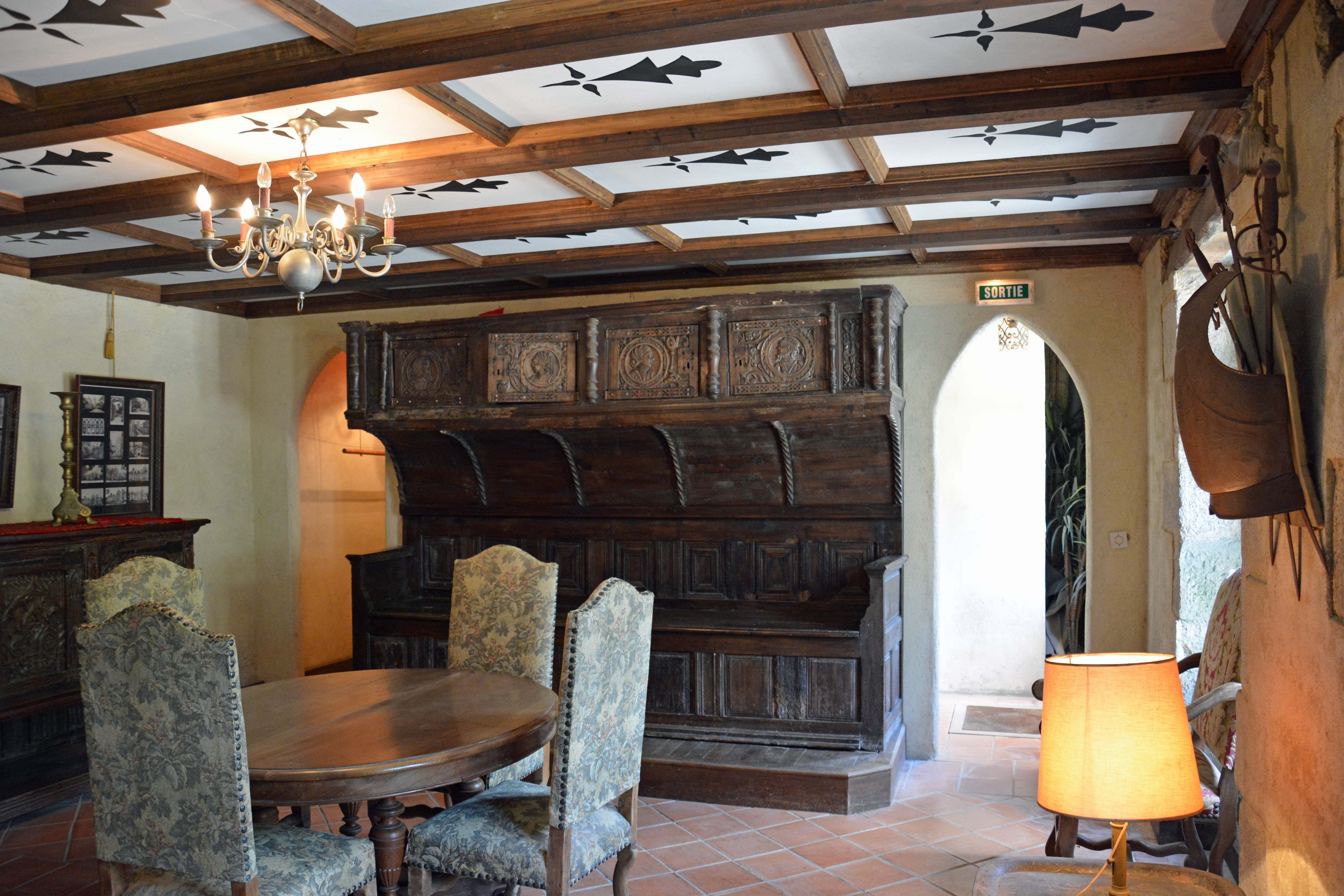

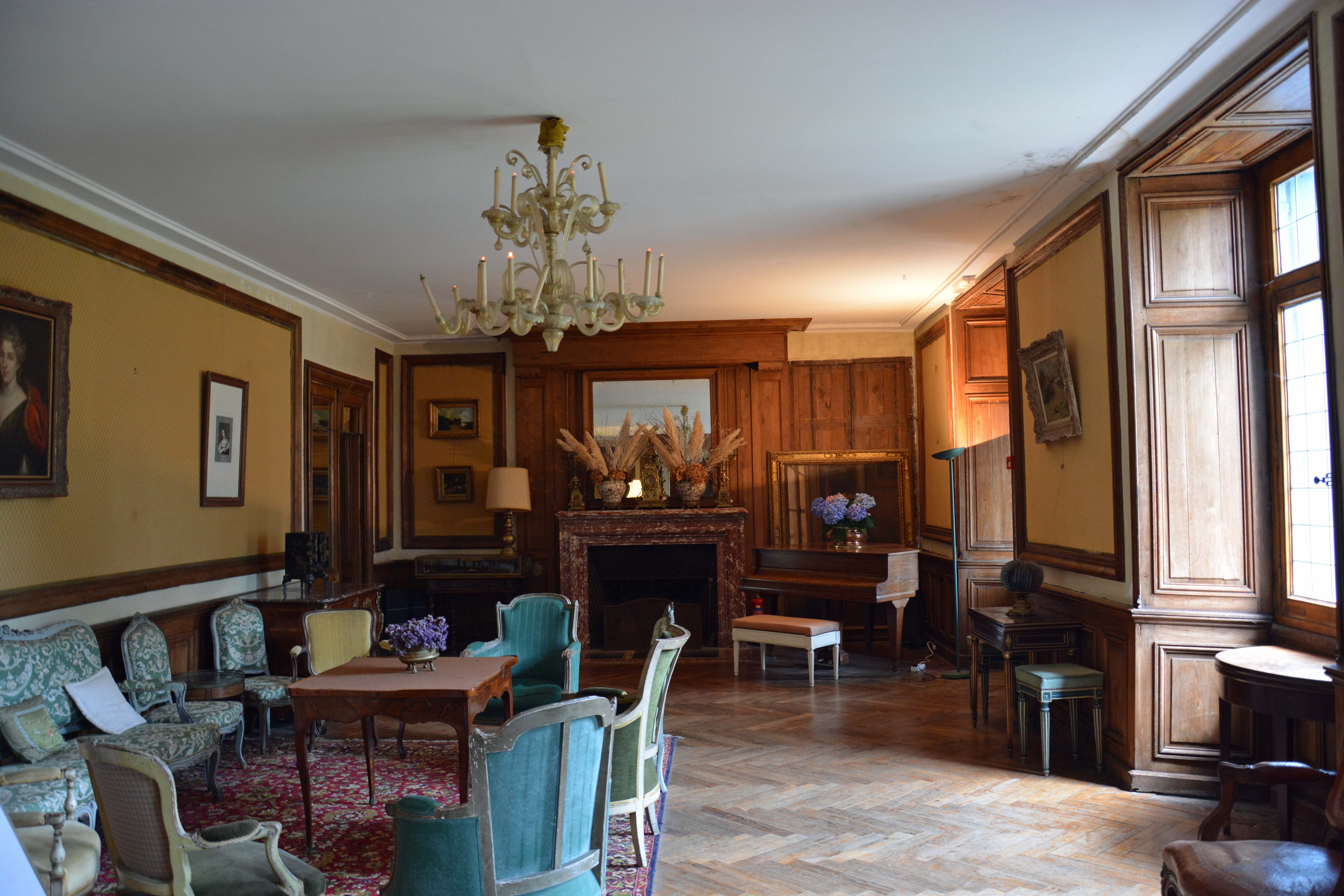

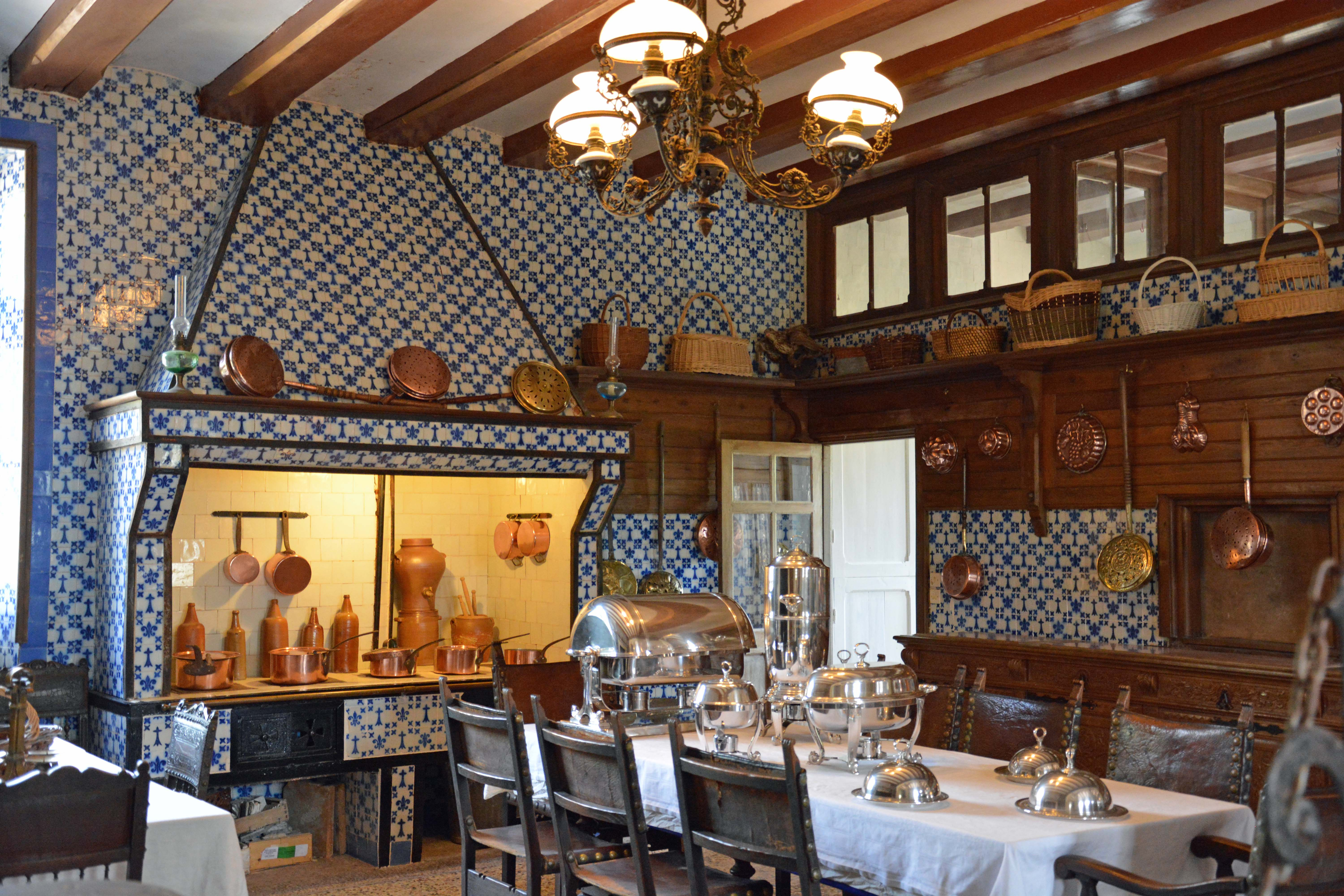

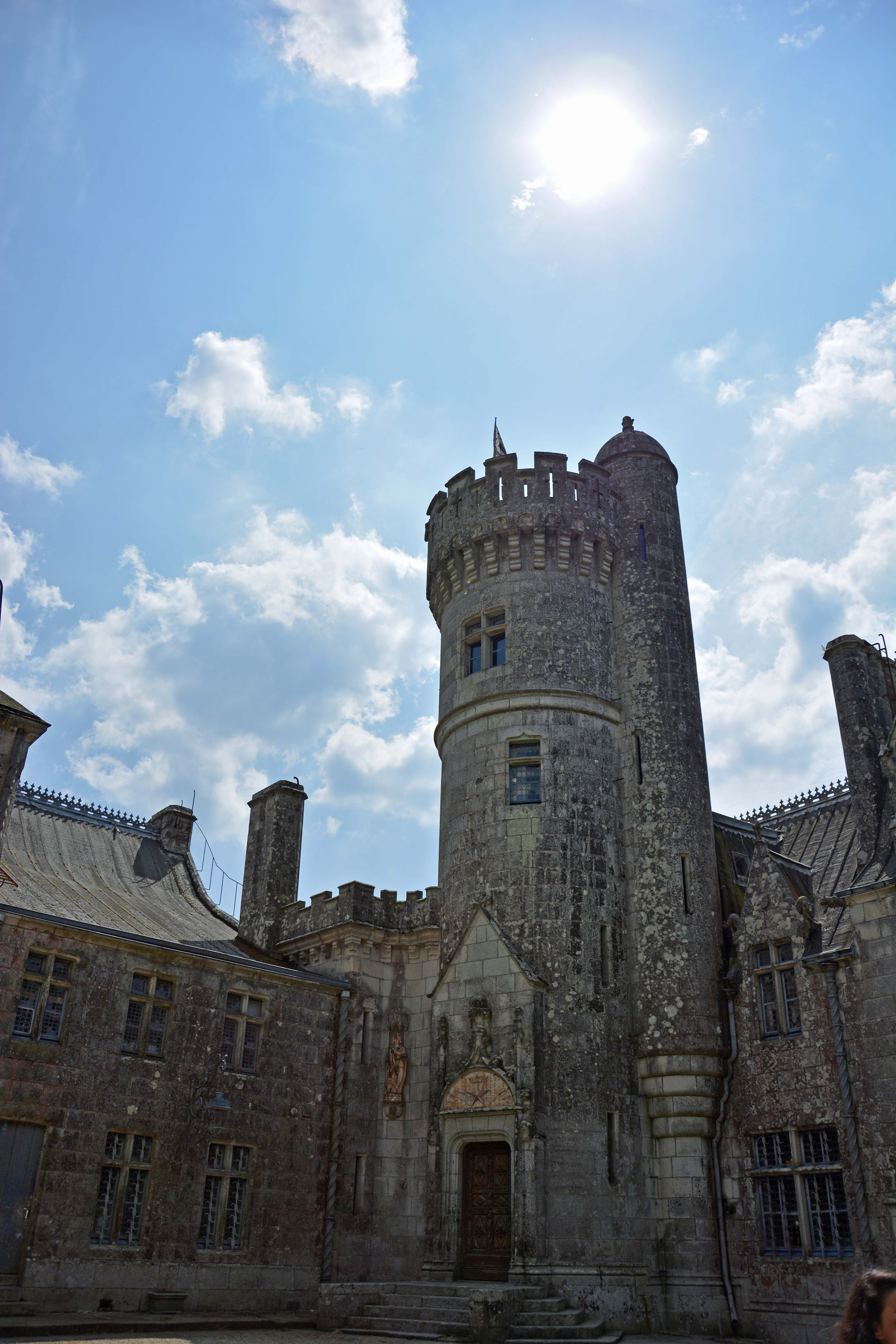

== See also ==
- Manoir de Stang-al-lin
- List of châteaux in Brittany

== Bibliography ==
- (in French) Prince Félix Youssoupoff, La fin de Raspoutine, V&O Éditions, 1992
- (in French) A. Paban, Catalogue du Musée Départemental de Kériolet, Librairie Le Tendre, Concarneau, 1900
- (in French) Collectif, Le Guide Quimper, Éditions du patrimoine, 2006
- (in French) Gilles et Bleuzen du Pontavice, La cuisine des châteaux de Bretagne, Éditions Ouest-France, 1997
- (in French) Collecif, Bretagne XXe, un siècle d'architectures, Terre de Brume, Archives Modernes d'Architecture de Bretagne, 2001
- (in French) Pierre Angrand, Histoire des musées de province au XIXe, l'Ouest, Le cercle d'or, 1984
