= Château de Saint-Aubin-du-Cormier =

Medieval castle in Brittany, France

- Saint-Aubin-du-Cormier, France
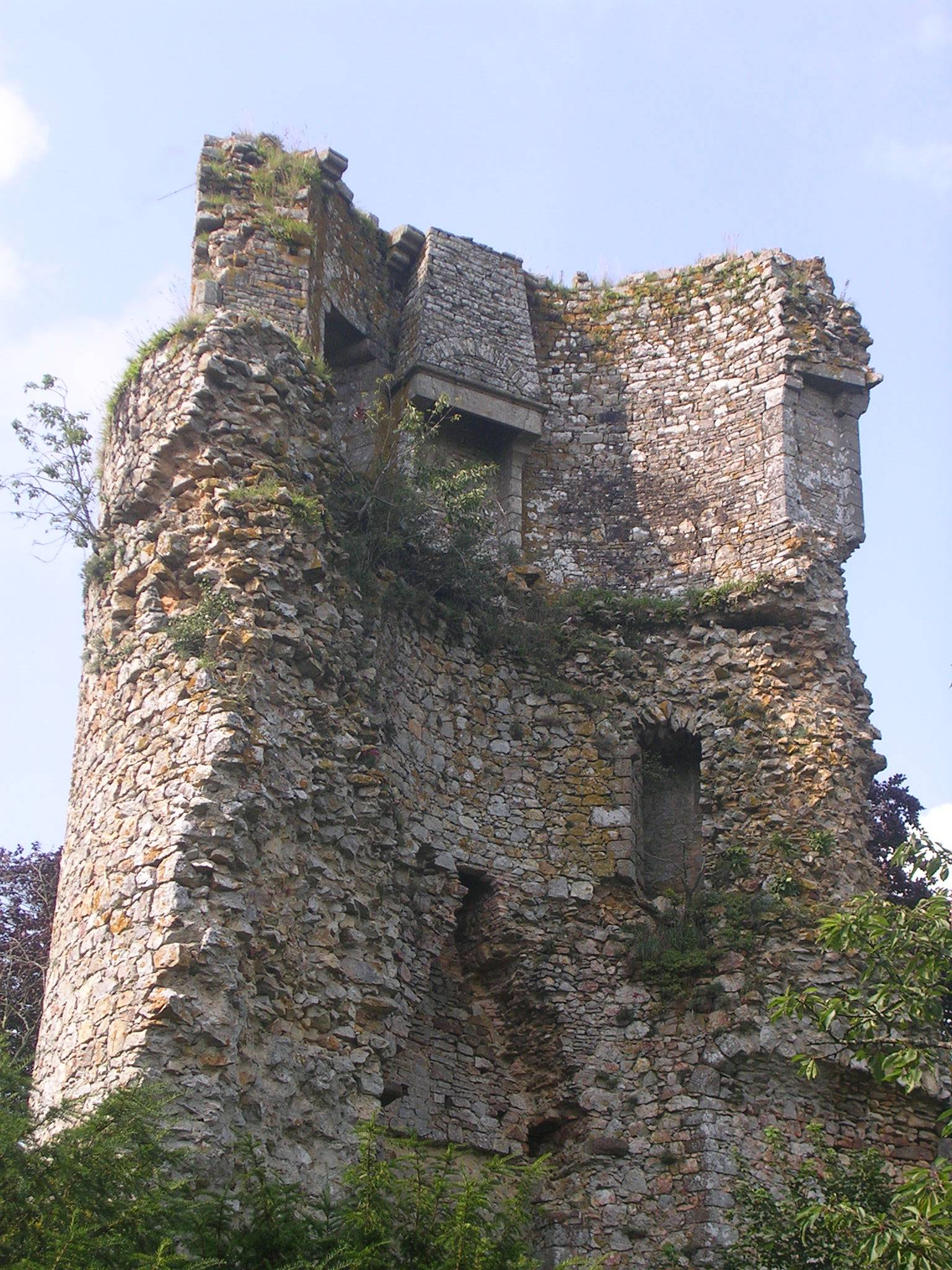

Site information
- Type: Castle
- Condition: Ruins

Location
- Coordinates: 48.2612°N 1.3940°E

Site history
- Built: 1225
- Built by: Peter I, Duke of Brittany
- Demolished: 1490
- Events: War of Breton Succession, Mad War

Château de Saint-Aubin-du-Cormier is a medieval castle, built in the 13th century in the commune of Saint-Aubin-du-Cormier in the département d'Ille-et-Vilaine in Brittany.

Dismantled in 1490, only the donjon remains today. It was registered as a monument historique on 15 December 1926.

== Location ==
Château de Saint-Aubin is located near the forest of Rennes, where there was already a chapel dedicated to Albinus of Angers.

== History ==
In 1225, Peter I, Duke of Brittany ordered the construction of a castle. The enceinte is quadrilateral and measures 100m by 30m with ten towers.

After the death of king Louis VIII, Peter I changed allegiance and fought for King Henry III of England. The French army under orders from Louis IX unsuccessfully attempted a siege in 1231, but Peter handed over the in 1234 when he submitted to the king of France.

During the War of Breton Succession, the castle was taken by Charles de Blois in 1342 before it was handed over to Jean IV de Montfort in 1381. The castle was remodelled in 1430 and at the same time ramparts were built around the town.

The castle was dismantled in 1490 and abandoned.

== Bibliography ==
- Dominique Le Page et Michel Nassiet, L'union de la Bretagne à la France, Morlaix, Skol Vreizh, 2003, 198 pages. ISBN 2-911447840.
- René Cintré, Les marches de Bretagne au Moyen Âge, Presses Universitaires de Rennes, 1992, 242 pages.
