= Clohars-Fouesnant =

Clohars-Fouesnant Kloar-Fouenant
- Commune
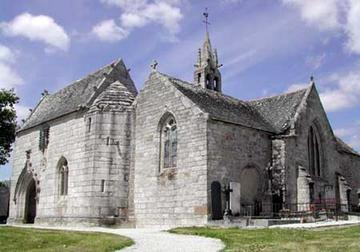
- The church of Saint-Hilaire, in Clohars-Fouesnant

- Coat of arms
- Location of Clohars-Fouesnant
- Location within France Location within Brittany
- Coordinates: 47°53′55″N 4°04′01″W
- Country: France
- Region: Brittany
- Department: Finistère
- Arrondissement: Quimper
- Canton: Fouesnant
- Intercommunality: Pays Fouesnantais

Government
  - Mayor (2020–2026): Michel Lahuec
- Area^{1}: 13.02 km^{2} (5.03 sq mi)
- Highest elevation: 66 m (217 ft)
- Lowest elevation: 0 m (0 ft)
- Population (2023): 2,264
  - Density: 173.9/km^{2} (450.4/sq mi)
- Time zone: UTC+01:00 (CET)
  - Summer (DST): UTC+02:00 (CEST)
- INSEE/Postal code: 29032 /29950
- ^{1} French Land Register data, which excludes lakes, ponds, glaciers > 1 km^{2} (0.386 sq mi or 247 acres) and river estuaries.

Clohars-Fouesnant (French pronunciation: [klɔaʁ fwɛnɑ̃]; Breton: Kloar-Fouenant) is a commune in the Finistère department of Brittany in north-western France.

== Population ==
Inhabitants of Clohars-Fouesnant are called in French Cloharsiens.

Historical population

Year	Pop.	±% p.a.
1793	485	—
1800	538	+1.49%
1806	444	−3.15%
1821	548	+1.41%
1831	586	+0.67%
1836	571	−0.52%
1841	614	+1.46%
1846	595	−0.63%
1851	665	+2.25%
1856	656	−0.27%
1861	656	+0.00%
1866	669	+0.39%
1872	615	−1.39%
1876	629	+0.56%
1881	635	+0.19%
1886	665	+0.93%
1891	733	+1.97%
1896	727	−0.16%
1901	709	−0.50%

Year	Pop.	±% p.a.
1906	721	+0.34%
1911	706	−0.42%
1921	693	−0.19%
1926	683	−0.29%
1931	624	−1.79%
1936	594	−0.98%
1946	608	+0.23%
1954	586	−0.46%
1962	605	+0.40%
1968	586	−0.53%
1975	801	+4.57%
1982	1,073	+4.26%
1990	1,279	+2.22%
1999	1,417	+1.14%
2007	2,097	+5.02%
2012	2,188	+0.85%
2017	2,055	−1.25%
2023	2,264	+1.63%

Source: EHESS and INSEE (1968–2023)

== See also ==
- Communes of the Finistère department
