= Quimper Cathedral =

Coordinates: 47°59′44″N 4°6′8″W

- Cathedral of Saint Corentin, Quimper
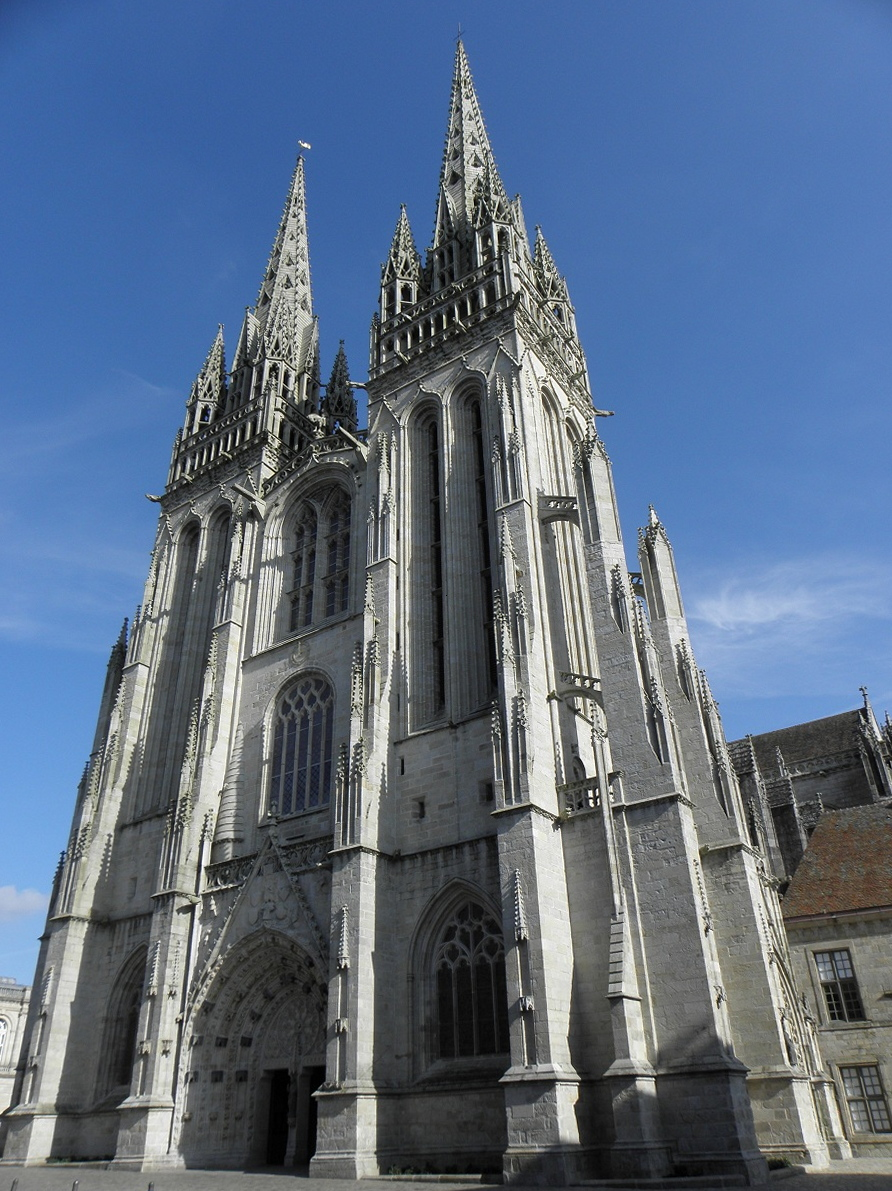
- West façade of Quimper Cathedral
- Quimper Cathedral
- Location: Quimper, Finistère
- Country: France
- Denomination: Roman Catholic Church

History
- Status: Cathedral
- Founded: 1239
- Dedication: St. Corentin of Quimper

Architecture
- Functional status: Active
- Architectural type: Church
- Style: Gothic

Administration
- Diocese: Quimper (–Cornouaille) and Léon

Clergy
- Bishop: Laurent Dognin

Quimper Cathedral, formally the Cathedral of Saint Corentin (French: Cathédrale Saint-Corentin de Quimper, Breton: Iliz-veur Sant-Kaourintin), is a Roman Catholic cathedral and national monument of Brittany in France. It is located in the town of Quimper and is the seat of the Diocese of Quimper and Léon. Saint Corentin was its first bishop.

The cathedral is notable in that, unlike most other Gothic cathedrals, it slightly bends in the middle to match the contours of its location, and avoid an area that was swampy at the time of the construction. Quimper cathedral is one of the seven cathedrals and basilicas covered by the Tro Breizh pilgrimage.

== History ==
According to legend King Gradlon met Saint Corentin on the mountain Mėnez-Hom and was so impressed by the strength of his religious faith that he invited the hermit to become Bishop of Quimper. Around 1070, a Romanesque cathedral was erected to replace an older Roman church during the episcopate of Felix (holder of the See of Cornouaille in 832).

In 1239, a new Gothic cathedral was ordered by Bishop Rainaud, starting with the construction of the choir, but it was not until the coming of Duke Jean V at the beginning of the 15th century that momentum gathered and the choir was covered with vaulting. Nevertheless, the unfinished building was consecrated in 1287, and the relics of Saint Corentin's arm were moved into the chapel in 1274. Further work on the building continued throughout the 15th and 16th centuries, with the first stone of the façade being laid in 1424, and transepts beginning in 1475. The transept and nave of the previous building, which had survived until then, were gradually dismantled. During the beginning of the 17th century, the cathedral would suffer from two fires: the first which destroyed the roof of the north tower in 1613, and a larger conflagration caused by lightning in 1620. The cathedral suffered from further looting during the French Revolution and the subsequent Reign of Terror, with the loss of much of its furniture and interior decorations. Similar to other cathedrals around France, the building was also converted into a Temple of Reason.

After the Concordat of 1801, numerous restorative projects were completed. Influenced by the reconstructions of Eugène Viollet-le-Duc, a major restoration campaign, lasting several decades, was carried out by Joseph-Marie Graveran. Neo Gothic spires were erected in 1854, and Yan' Dargent was commissioned to paint pictorial decorations of the walls surrounding the choir of the chapels. The famous "golden altar" was gifted by Napoleon III, the first French head of state to officially visit Quimper. When the cathedral was completed, the choir was misaligned with the nave, having a slight curve to the left, this to avoid disturbing the older chapel which contained the tomb of Alan Canhiart.

Despite being occupied by Nazi Germany during World War II, the cathedral and town were spared from Allied bombardment.

== Exterior ==
There are several portals to the cathedral: the three north portals, the south portal (known as the Porche de la Vierge) and the west portal.

=== Portals ===
There are three portals on the cathedral's north side. On the far right is the "Porche des Baptêmes", which leads to the north nave. The portal comprises a double door separated by a trumeau. The "Porche de la Chandeleur" is located at the northern end of the transept and was built between 1475 and 1479 by the mason Pierre Le Goaraguer and his son Guillaume. The single door is surmounted by a triangular pediment and the arch's external voussures are decorated with carvings of acanthus leaves. The third portal, situated between the "Porche des Baptêmes" and the "Porche de la Chandeleur", is small and in earlier times gave access to the ossuary and cemetery; it is no longer used.

=== The western façade of Saint-Corentin cathedral and the west portal ===
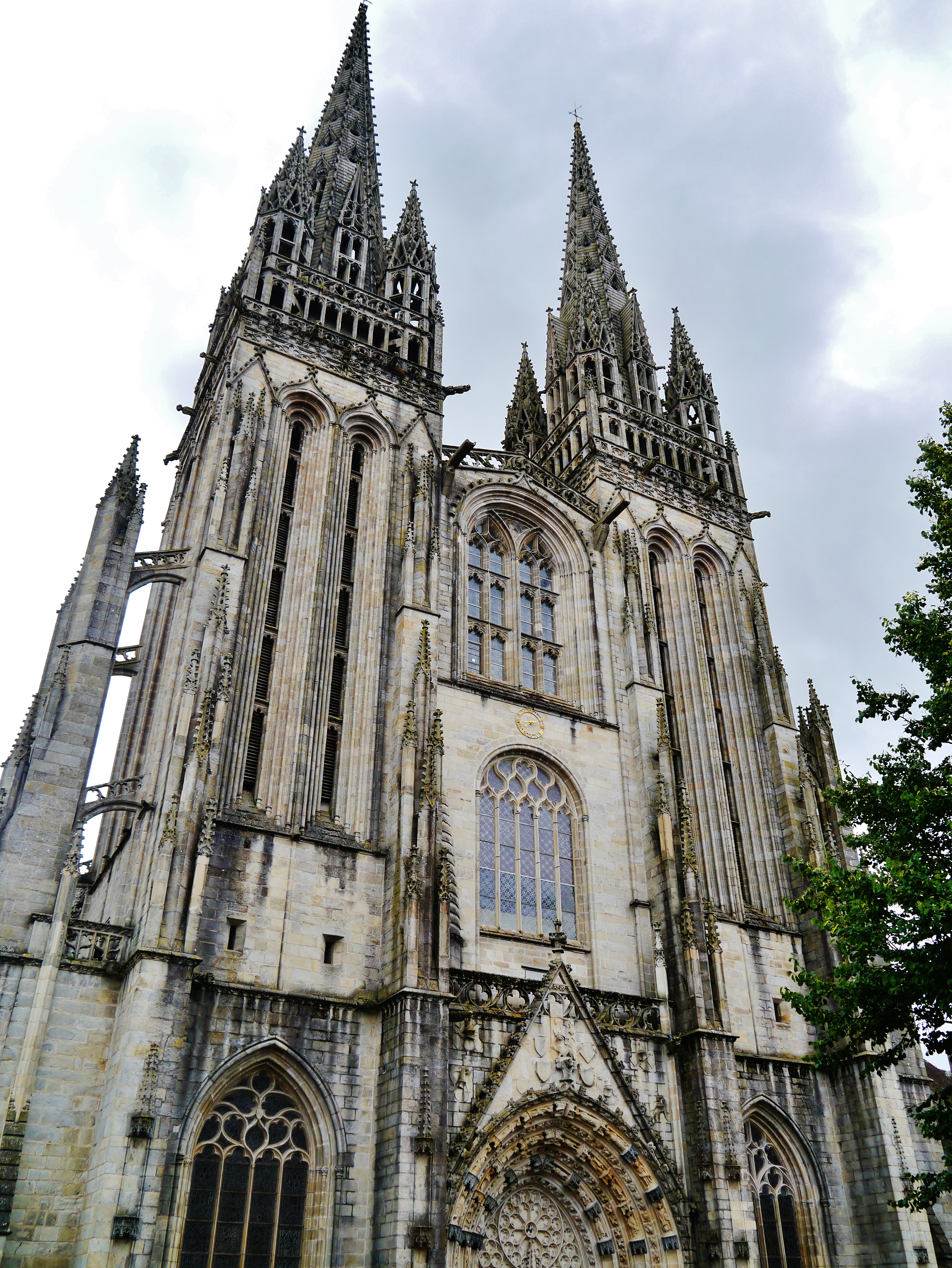
The west façade and portal

The west façade of the cathedral comprises two great spires and a magnificent portal with a series of angels decorating the arch's voussoirs. On the trumeau is a statue of Christ giving a blessing whilst holding a globe and treading on a grimacing demon. Before 1793, the sculpture on the trumeau had been an equestrian figure in granite of Jean V but that was destroyed in that year. At the top of an arch between the two spires there is a statue of King Gradlon. The first stone of the western facade was laid on 26 July 1424 by Monseigneur Bertrand de Rosmadec in the presence of a representative of Jean V, the Duke of Bretagne. Both within and without the triangular pediment above the voussoirs, are many crests and mottos including the crest of the helmeted lion of Montfort holding a standard bearing the words "Malo au riche duc!", the battle-cry of Breton dukes, the arms of Jean V, the Duke of Bretagne's three sons, the crest of Jeanne de France, Guillaume de Rosmadec, Bertrand de Rosmadec, the barons of Névet with the motto "Pérag?" "Pourquoi?" and the motto of the nobles of Bodigneau and Clohars-Fouesnant "À l'aventure!", whilst on the right and near a helmet decorated with valances is the motto of the nobles of Guengat "Léal à ma Foy" and the arms of the nobles of Quélenec.

=== The cathedral's south portal ===
The south portal is part of the "facade mėridionale" or "south facade" and is known as the "Porche de la Vierge" or the "Porche de Sainte Catherine". It has a statue of the Virgin Mary with child in the tympanum, with angels wafting censers on either side. She is seated and below her feet is the bust of an angel with spread wings. The child she holds is gently stroking a bird which he carries. In a niche in one of the buttresses there is a statue of Catherine of Alexandria carved from kersanton. Above the door is a triangular pediment with three ėcussons ("crests or shields") including the crest of the Duchess Jeanne de France surmounted by the "hermine passante" ("passing stoat"), the emblem of Brittany, with the inscription "A ma vie". Also shown are the arms and mottos of Monseigneur de Rosmadec and Guillaume de Rosmadec. Just outside of the pediment are the crests of the Bodigneau family and the family Quėlennec. The voussoirs in the upper part of the portal's arch depict 8 angels playing instruments. The niches in the lower voussoirs are empty.

== Interior ==
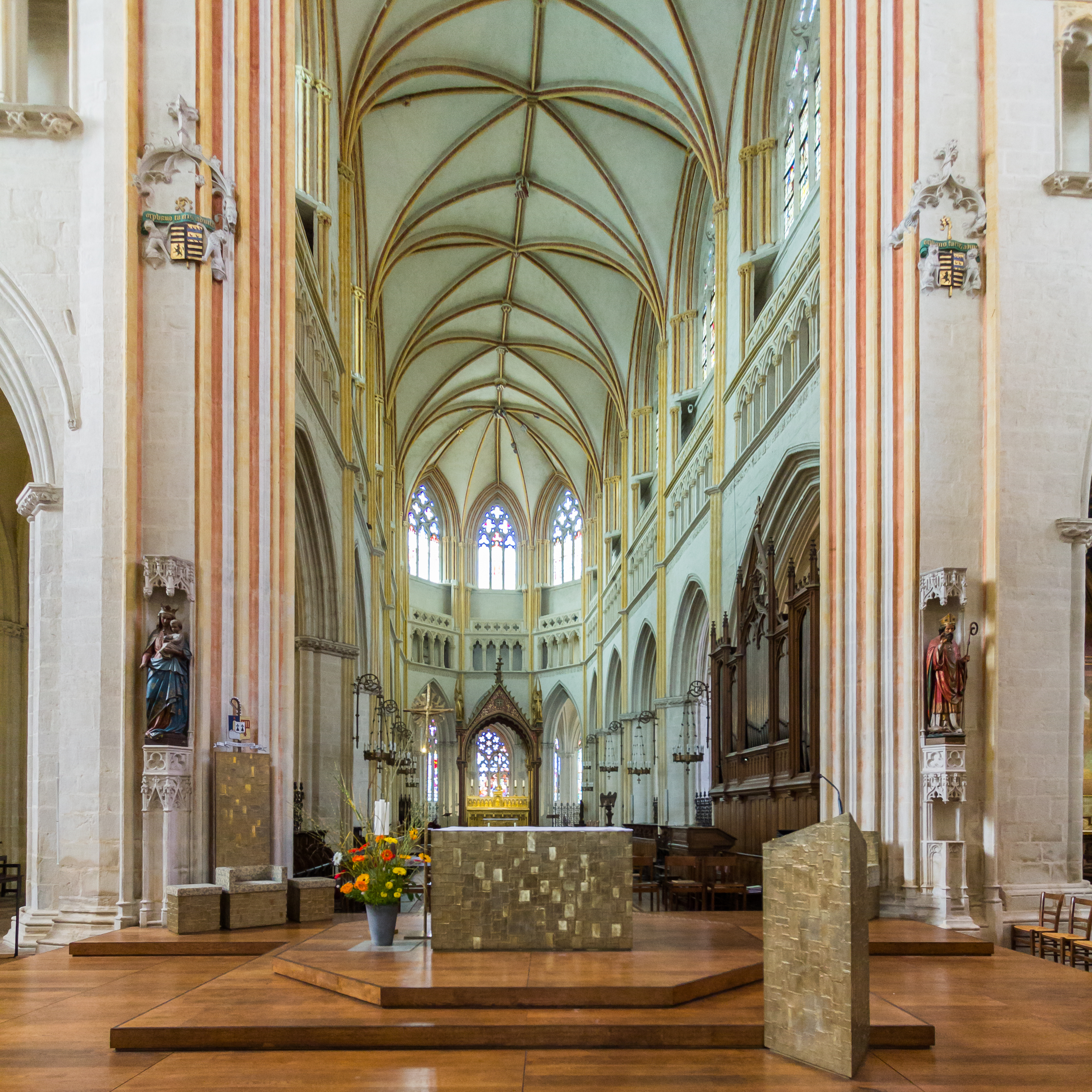
Interior view of the cathedral

=== Stained glass ===
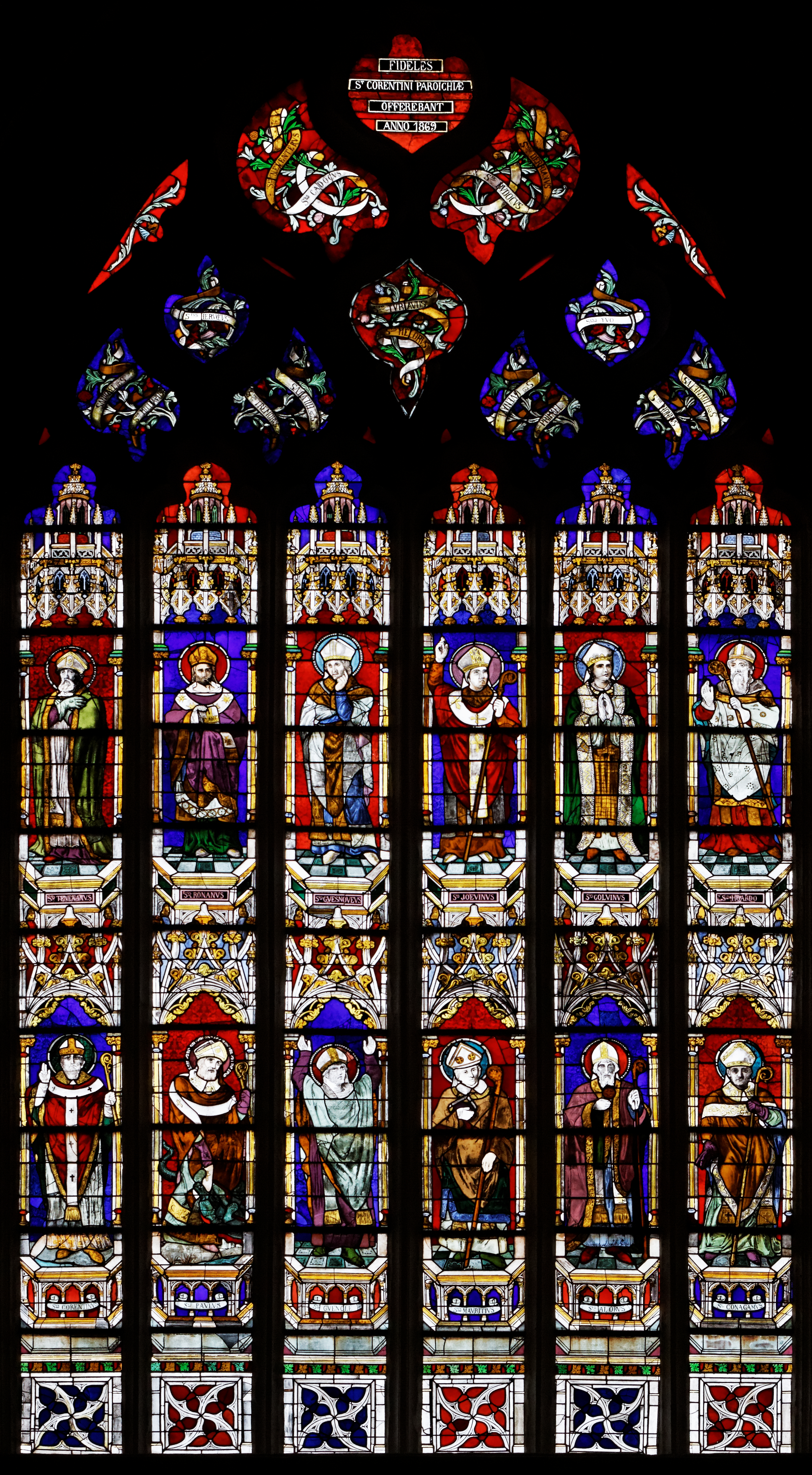
Stained glass window depicting famous Breton bishops

The cathedral has numerous large stained glass windows, ranging from the 15th to the 19th centuries. The windows depict a variety of subjects, particularly Breton, such as Paul Aurelian, Ivo of Kermartin, Saint Roch, Ronan of Locronan, and the cathedral's patron, Corentin of Quimper. There are also windows depicting French saints such as Louis IX of France and Anselm of Canterbury. Alongside images of Breton and French saints, there are many windows depicting other famous saints, the Virgin Mary, and Jesus.

=== Chapels ===
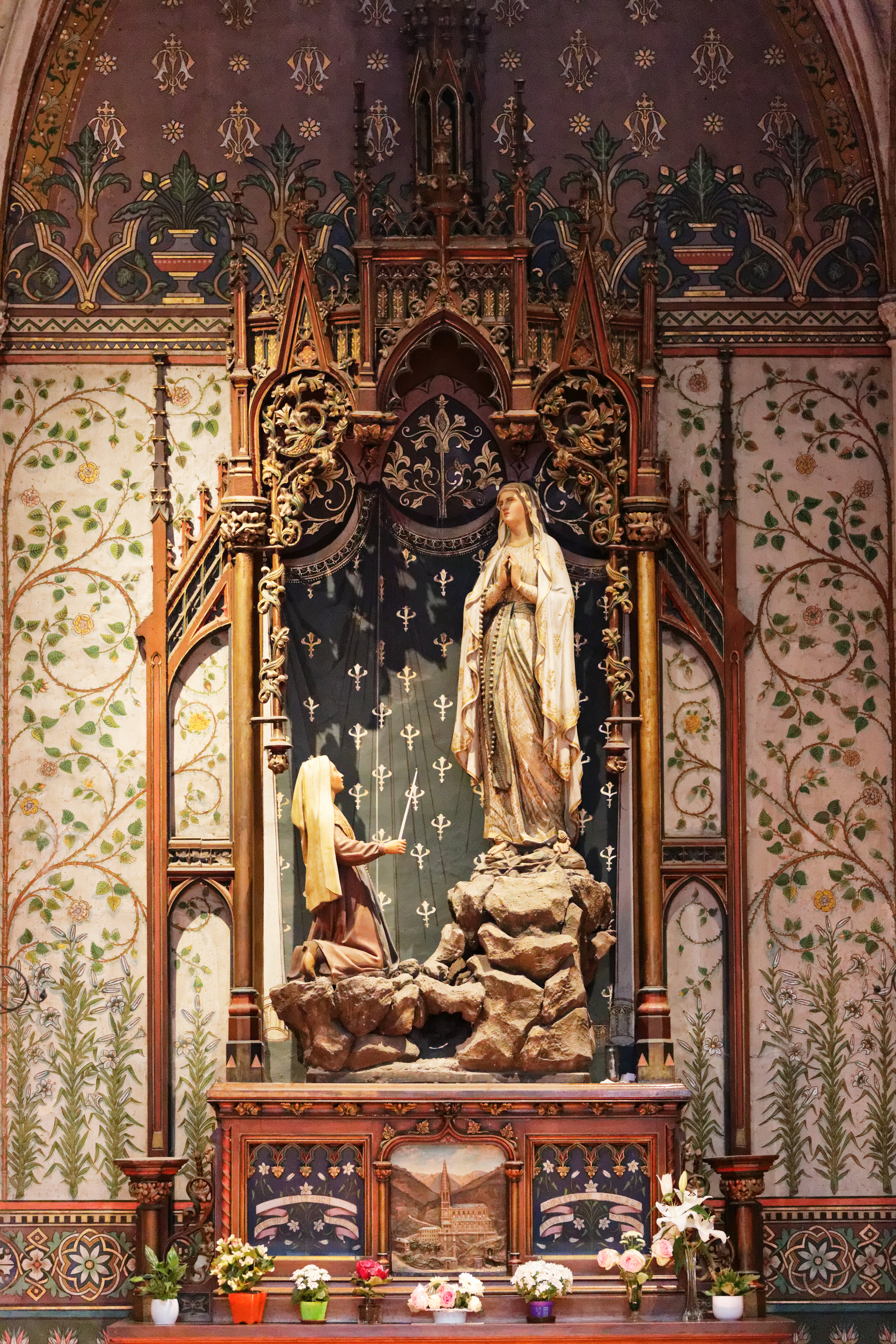
Chapel of Our Lady of Lourdes

There are multiple side chapels lining the nave, including the Baptistery, Chapel of Our Lady of Victories, Chapel of the Sacred Heart, Chapel of Our Lady of Lourdes, and various smaller chapels to saints and other Catholic devotions.

=== Statues ===
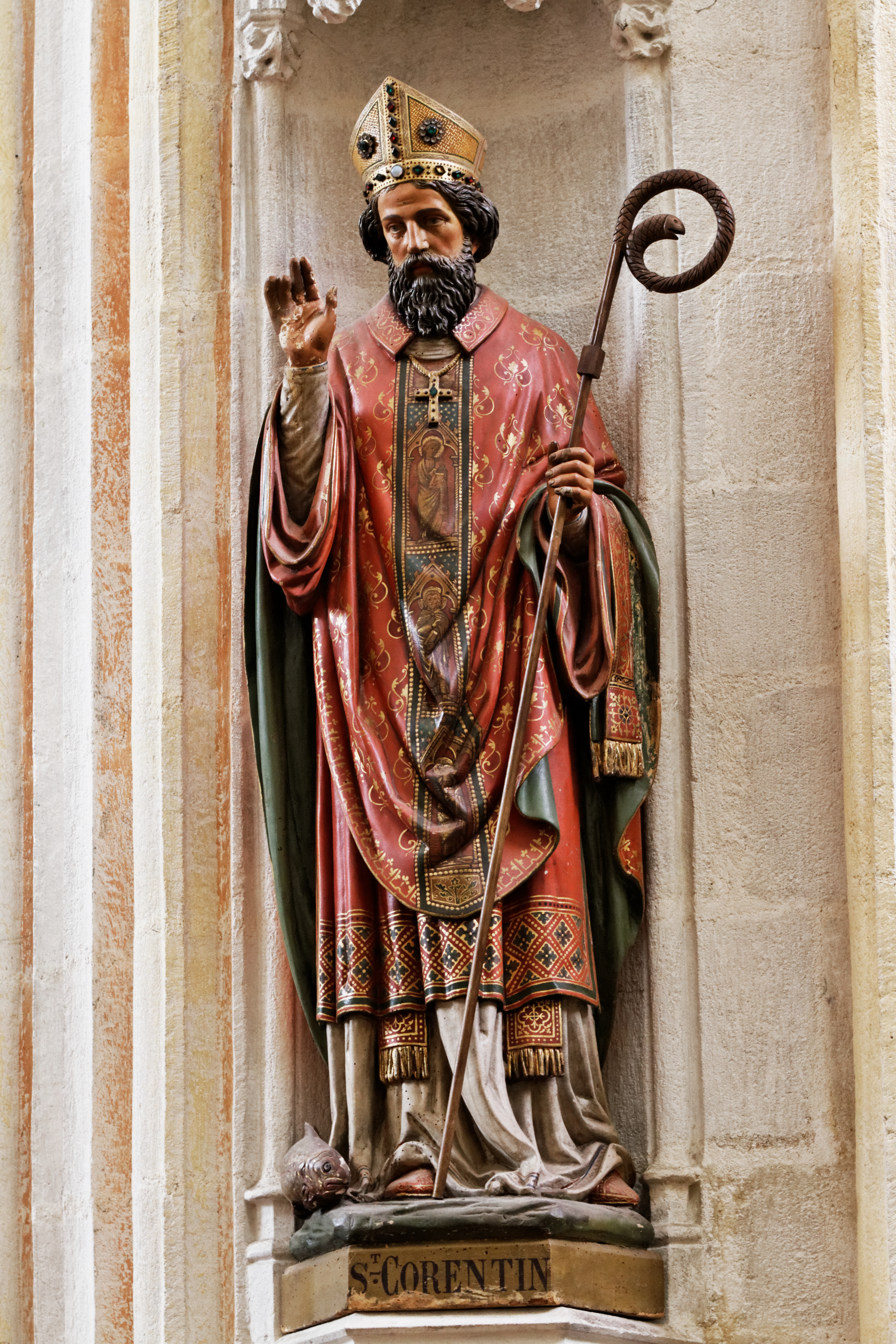
Statue of Saint Corentin of Quimper

There are four marble statues in the cathedral: The statue called "Vierge Mère dite Notre Dame d'Espérance", this by the sculptor Auguste Ottin and dating to 1846; the statue by Buors depicting Sainte Anne; the statue of Sainte Thérèse de Lisieux and the statue of Joan of Arc. The one statue in granite is the carving on the trumeau of the west portal depicting "Christ Sauveur du Monde". There are also statues carved from wood: the sculptor Mingham's Saint Christopher in polychromed wood; a 16th-century group including Sainte Anne and the Virgin Mary with child; the statue of Saint Jean Discalcéat or Santig Du/Santik Du ("petit saint noir") dating to the 17th century. Finally, there are statues in alabaster including the statue of John the Baptist in the Baptistry and the altarpiece representing Sainte Catherine with a sword and skull, Sainte Marguerite with dragon and two abbesses.

=== Pulpit ===
The pulpit dates to 1680 and is the work of the carpenter Jean Michelet and the sculptor Olivier Daniel. On the pulpit and pulpit stairway are a series of panels decorated with scenes from the life of Saint Corentin.

=== Main altar ===
It was Monseigneur René Nicolas Sergent who pressed for an altar to match the grandeur of the cathedral and Mon.Boeswilwad, the architect-in-chief of "Monuments Historiques" was put in charge of the project. He commissioned the goldsmith Placide Poussielgue-Rusand to create the altar. Poussielgue-Rusand also worked on the altars in the Sacrė-Coeur, Sainte Anne and Saint Pierre chapels as well as the elaborate reliquary said to contain the arm of Saint Corentin. Poussielgue-Rusand's altar was in fact exhibited at the 1867 Exposition Universelle and was gifted to the town of Quimper by Napoleon III. The altar is consequently known as the L'autel d'Or or the autel Napolėon. This main altar was consecrated by Monseigneur René Nicolas Sergent in 1868.

=== Tombs ===
Seven of the tombs in the cathedral are listed. These are:-

- The tomb of Even de la Forết who died in 1290. This is the oldest tomb in the cathedral and de la Forết's remains are placed within an enfeu (a tomb placed within a wall) in the north wall of the apse chapel (apsidal chapel). The white stone tombstone which identifies the grave has his portrait and an epitaph inscribed on it.
- The granite tomb of Monseigneur Gatien de Morceaux, who died in 1416, has a gisant carved from white stone. This is also in the apse chapel. The tomb has lobed arches.
- The gisant and tomb of Bishop Geffroy Le Marec'h who died in 1318 is located in the south ambulatory beneath the Santik Du window
- Also in the south ambulatory and the Saint-Jean-Baptiste chapel is the tomb and gisant of Monseigneur Bertrand de Rosmadec who died in 1445 and was an important benefactor of the cathedral and took an important part in the cathedral's construction. The tomb carries the inscription "M: CCC: LXXX: III"
- In the chapel Saint-Paul is the tomb and gisant of Canon Pierre du Quenquis who died in 1459 and was another major benefactor of the cathedral. The tombstone and gisant are carved from granite quarried at Scaër.
- In the side of the nave is the tomb, carved from kersanton of Bishop Alain Le Maout who died in 1493. This tomb is located in the Chapelle de Sépulchre
- In the baptistery (Chapelle des fonts baptismaux) is the tomb and gisant of Monseigneur Raoul Le Moēl who died in 1501.

Amongst the tombs unlisted are:-

- The tomb of Monseigneur Graveran who died in 1855 and was the work of the Nantes sculptor Ménard is located in the Saint Pierre chapel.
- The tomb in kersanton of Monseigneur René Sergent who died in 1871 is located In the Notre-Dame du Rosaire chapel. It is the work of the Lorient sculptor Le Brun.
- Plaques recording the burial place of Bishop René du Louët who died in 1668 and Monseigneur Touissant Conen de Saint Luc, who died in 1790, are placed on either side of the axial chapel.
- The tomb of Monseigneur Lamarche who died in 1892 can be seen beneath the window dedicated to Charles Borromėe. The tomb is decorated with a gilded bronze triptych.
- The bronze tomb of Monseigneur Duparc, who died in 1946 is located in front of Maurice Denis' war memorial.
- The tombs of Monseigneur Yves Caballic, who died in 1280 and Canon Olivier de Conque are located in the Saint Frėdėric chapel.
- The tomb of Monseigneur Valleau, who died in 1898 and is marked by a silver medallion can be found in the Saint Roch chapel
- The tomb of Monseigneur Dom Anselme Nouvel de la Flēche, who died in 1887 is located in the Saint Corentin chapel and Bishop Alain Rivelen, who died in 1299 in the cathedral's Notre Dame de la Victoire chapel.
- The tomb of Monseigneur Francis Barbu, who died in 1991 and is the last bishop buried in the cathedral, is marked by a medallion executed by P.Toulhoat and located the Trois Goutes de sang chapel.

== Cloisters and exhibits from the Breton Museum ==
Part of the cloisters are preserved on the south side of the cathedral together with some old tombstones from an earlier burial ground. The nearby Breton Museum has also placed some pieces of sculpture in the space between the museum and the cloisters. One of these sculptures is a "statue gėminėe" featuring John the Evangelist and Saint Peter taken from a calvary which had stood at Coat-Quėau in Scrignac. It is carved from granite and dates to the 16th century. Sculptors employed on calvaries at that time used the technique of the "statue gėminėe" when carving pieces for the crosspieces of crosses and would carve two back to back figures from one piece of stone. The figures from Scrignac show how the two figures are in fact carved from the one piece.

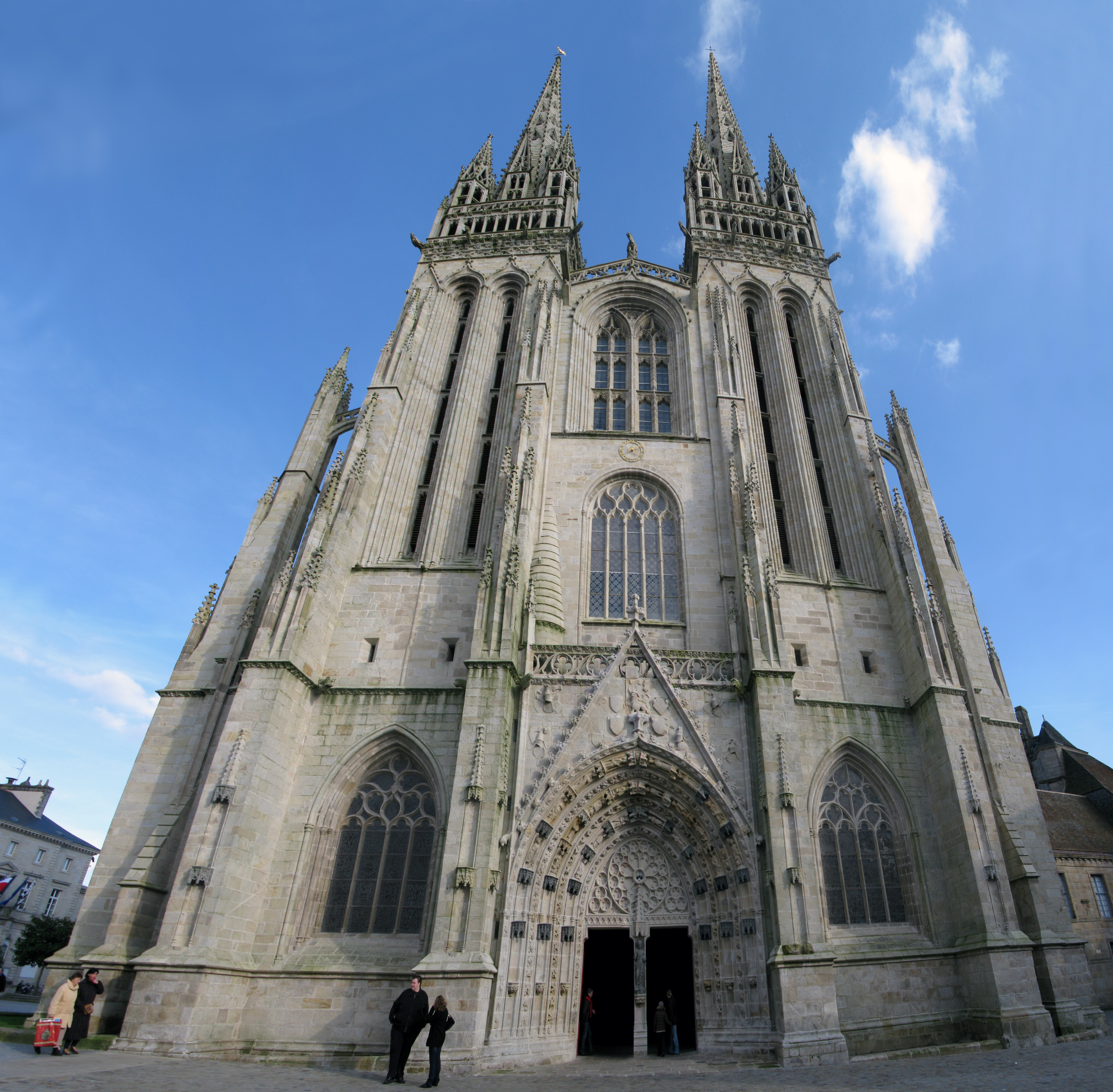
View of the cathedral

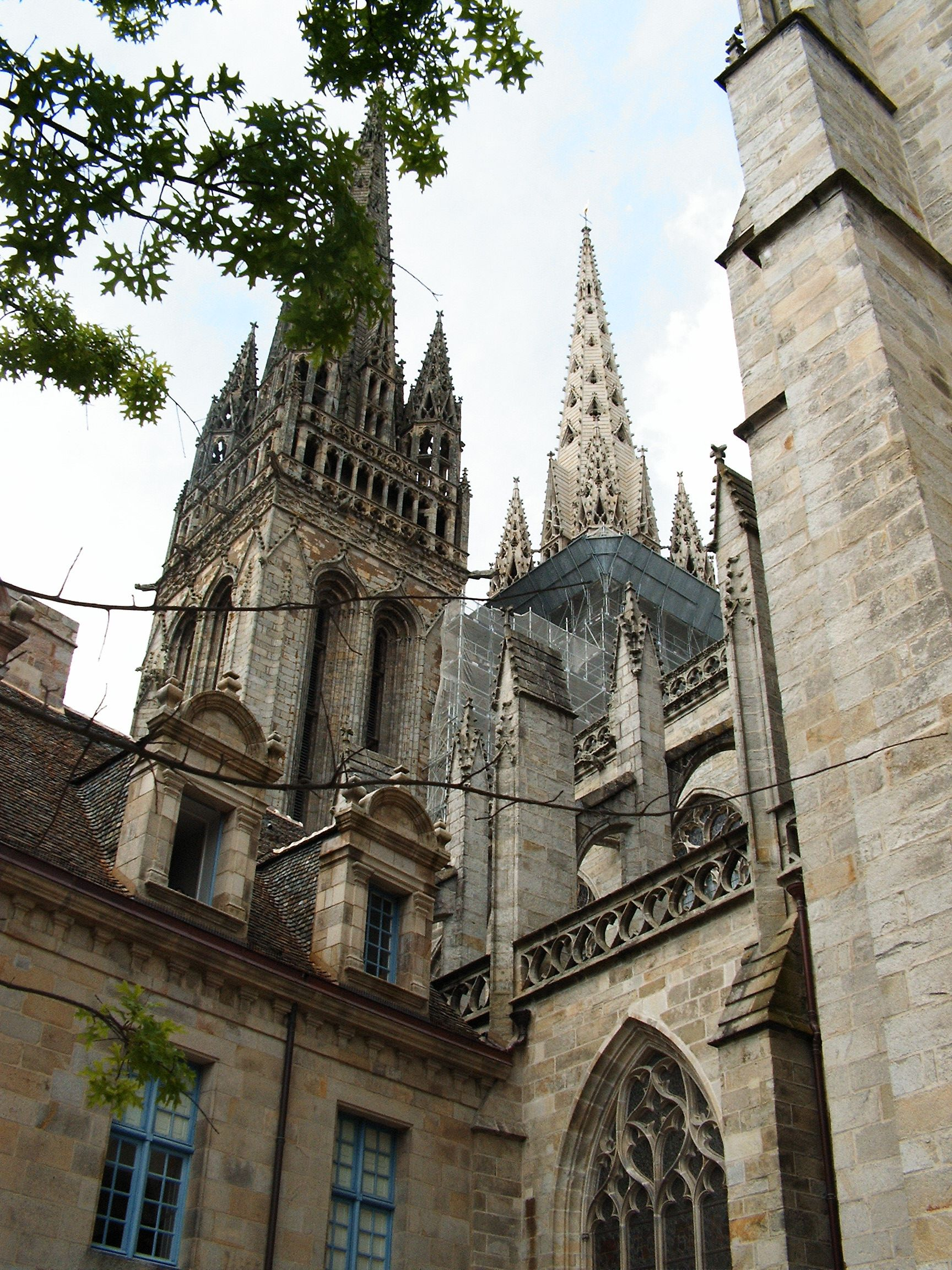
Another view of the cathedral

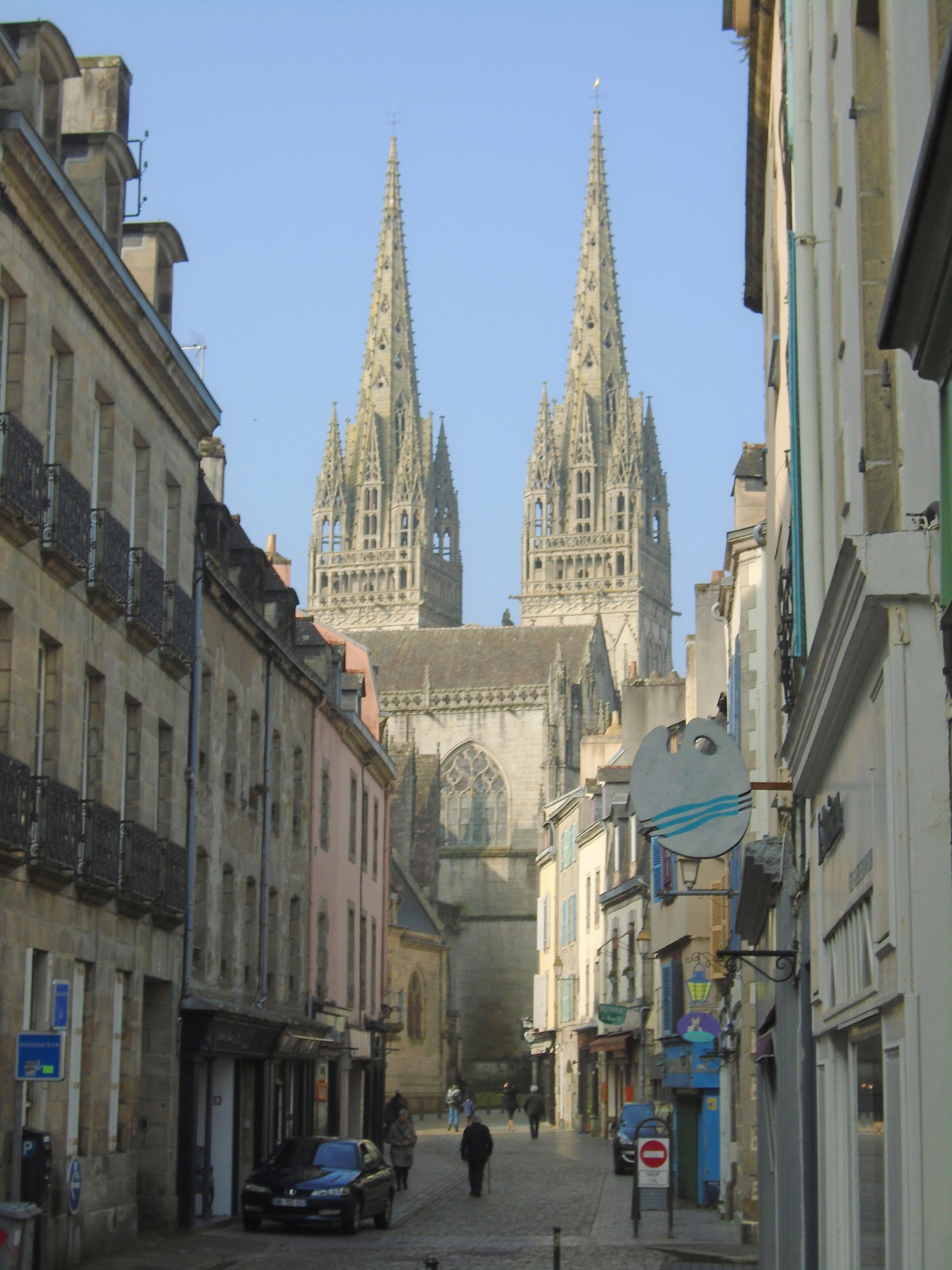
View of the cathedral from one of the approach roads

== See also ==
- List of works of the two Folgoët ateliers
- Joseph Bigot
