= Henri Guinier =

French painter (1867–1927)

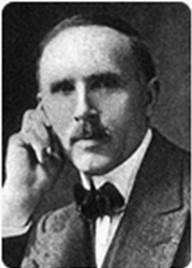
Henri Guinier (date unknown)

Henri Guinier (20 November 1867, Paris - 10 October 1927, Neuilly-sur-Seine) was a French portrait and landscape painter.

== Biography ==
Due to his father's pressure, he joined the "École des Arts et Métiers" (Arts and Sciences) of Châlons-sur-Marne in 1883, as an engineering student, and graduated in 1889. But then, he took courses at the Academie Julian and the École des beaux-arts in Paris, being attached to the studios of Jean-Joseph Benjamin-Constant and Jules Lefebvre. In 1896 he was awarded second prize in the Prix de Rome, followed by a gold medal at the Salon des artistes français in 1898. In that year he won a bursary which took him to Holland, Switzerland and Italy. He also won a silver medal at the great Paris 1900 "Exposition universelle".

In 1904 he married Hélène Glaçon and they had a son, Michel, and a daughter, Annette. Michel was an engineer and worked on the Paris Metro. Annette was one of her father's favourite models. Michel was also an expert on musical organs.

It was in Paris that he made the acquaintance of fellow artist, Fernand Legout-Gérard, who introduced him into the artists' community at Concarneau where he purchased a villa called Kerdorlett, by the beach and facing west. This became his summer residence while winters were spent at his house in Neuilly-sur-Seine. He became the president of the "Union artistique des Amis de Concarneau" whose membership included painters such as Alfred Guillou and Thomas Alexander Harrison, an american painter who stayed frequently at Pont-Aven in the summer.

He was an excellent pastellist and colorist and painted many portraits, mostly of women. He painted landscapes and marine views, mostly around Concarneau and the Pays Bigouden, as well as Le Faouët, Vannes, Paimpol and the Île-de-Bréhat.

He painted many subjects: the allegorical, genre works, nudes, portraits and the countryside, and spent time in Italy, Holland, the Alps and the Pyrénées.

He also received many public commissions including, in 1909, with several other artists, the decoration of the Neuilly-sur-Seine townhall for which he painted the composition La Tapisserie. The Ministry of War commissioned him to paint scenes from the battlefield at Verdun where he completed several pastels.

From 1920 onwards, he passed part of the winters in the mountains and painted scenes in both Pau and Argelès-Gazost as well as in the valley of the Chamonix.

In 2007, the family gave their archives to the museum in Quimper- the "Musée départemental Breton". In 2008, the museum of Le Faouët held a retrospective exhibition of his work.

== Gallery ==
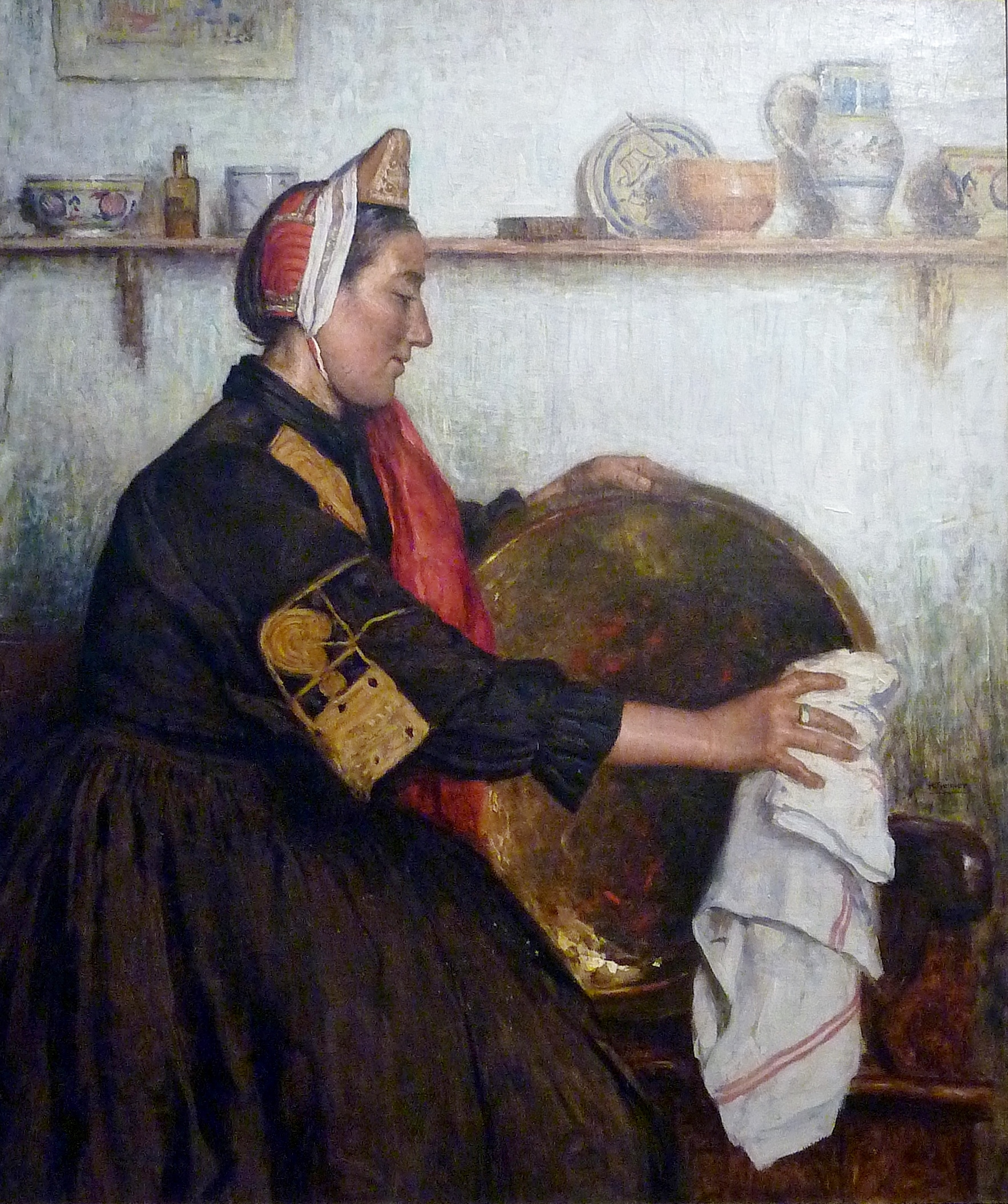
Woman from Bigouden at Work

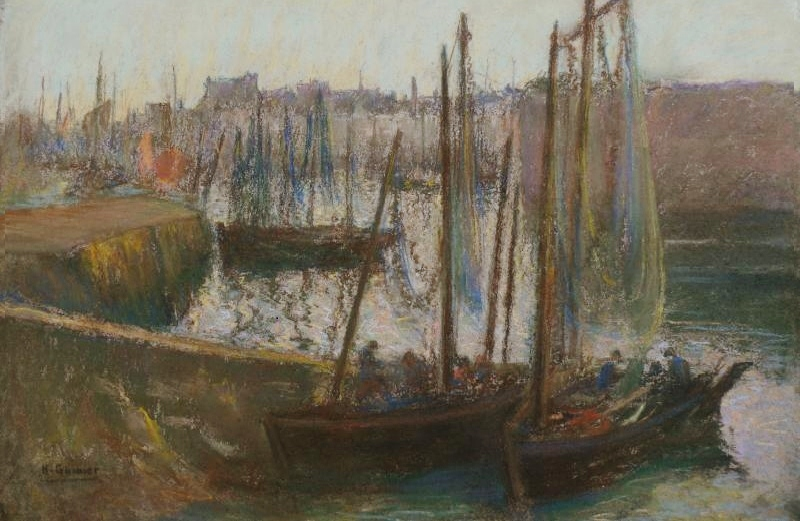
View of the Passage, Concarneau

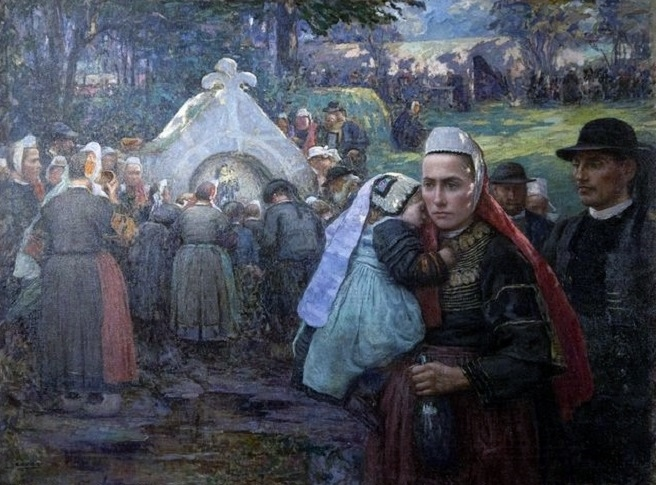
Breton Pardon Ceremony

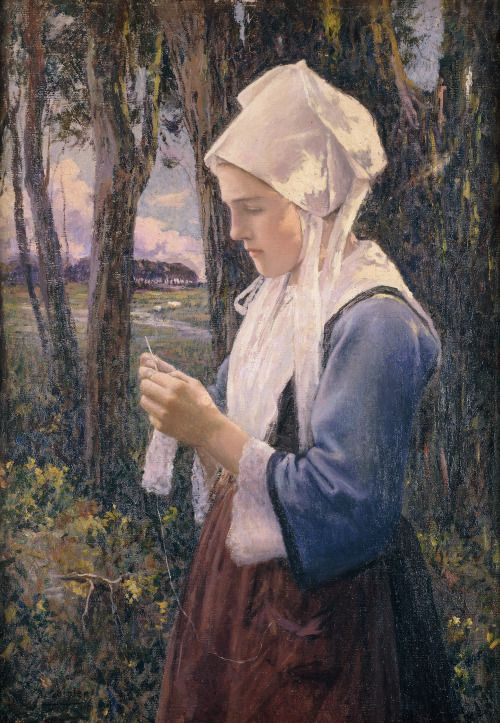
Peaceful Work

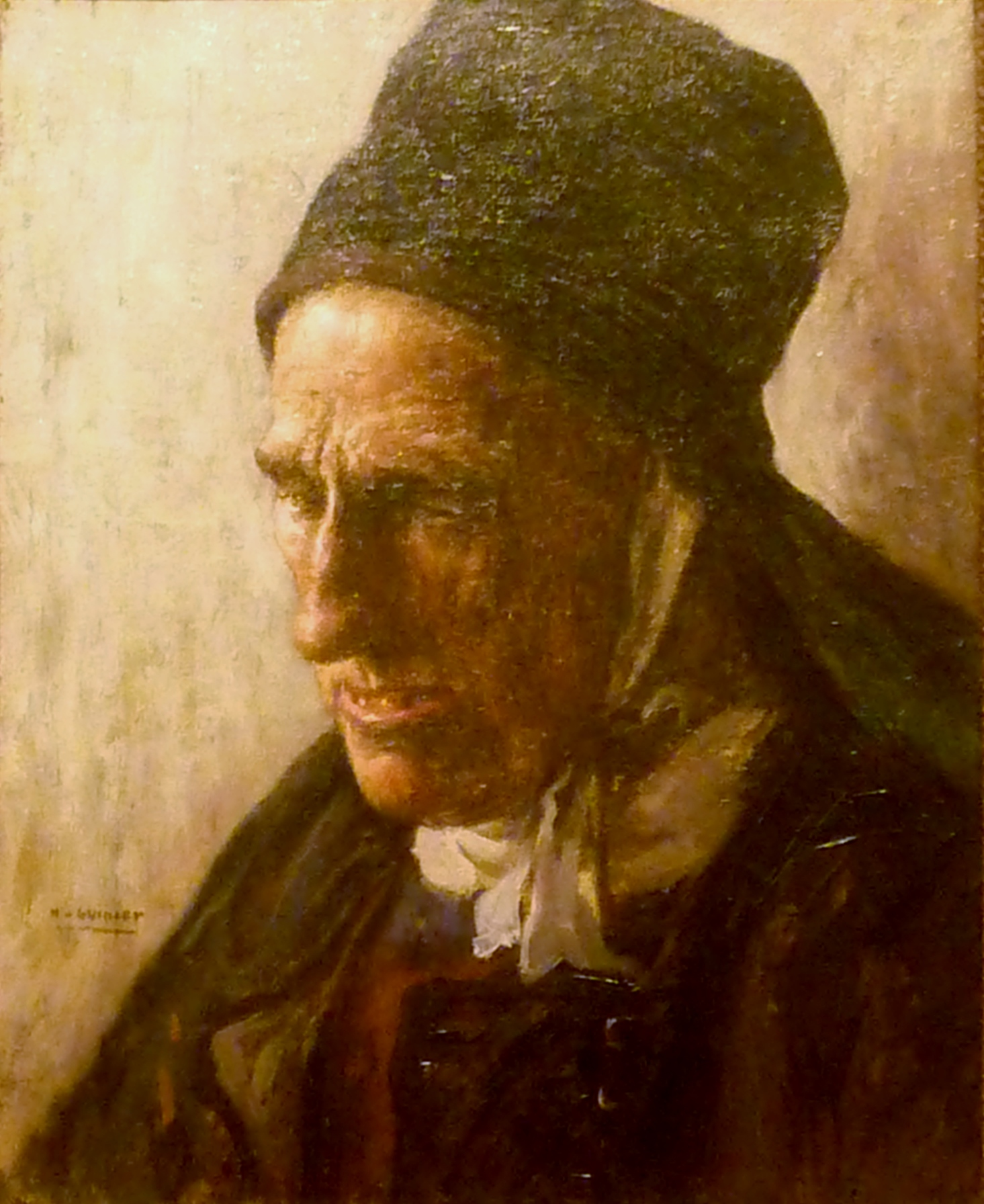
Aged Breton from
Le Faouët

== Works ==
- "Figure dessinée d'après nature". École des beaux-arts de Paris
- "Petite fille aux champs". Painting dates to 1893. Held by Musée d'Amboise.
- "Jésus pleuré par les Saintes Femmes'". Painting dates to 1895. Awarded second place in the "Prix de Rome" and held in the Musée de Joigny
- "Des pèlerins découvrant la ville de Jérusalem depuis une hauteur se prosternent et prient". Painting dates to 1895., École des beaux-arts de Paris
- "L'automne". Painting dates to 1895. Held by Musée d'Orsay, Paris
- '"Psyché et l'amour". Work of 1897, Musée de Poitiers
- "'Un dimanche, enfants de Marie". Painted in 1898. palais des beaux-arts de Lille
- "Chant du soir". Painting dated 1899. Musée national du Chili, Santiago
- "Nuit douce". A print of 1899.
- "Plaisir d'été'". 1901. A lithograph
- "Le pardon de Sainte-Anne-d'Auray". Painting dates to 1902. Musée de Dijon
- '"Ophélie". Painting dates to 1903. Musée des beaux-Arts, Reims
- "Femme pensive". Painting dates to 1907), Musée de Mulhouse
- "Femme à la coiffe rouge à fleurs". A pastel held by Musée du Faouët.
- '"Jeune tricoteuse au Faouët". Musée du Faouët
- '"Vieille bretonne du Faouët". 1910. oil on canvas. Held by Musée du Faouët.
- "Portrait de sardinière". Painting dating to around 1914. Musée de la Pêche, Concarneau
- "Vieux paysan Breton tenant son chapeau devant lui". A sketch in the Musée du Louvre, Paris
- "Jeune femme bretonne assise". A sketch held by Musée du Louvre, Paris
- "La prière en Bretagne". Painting dating to 1906
- "La fontaine miraculeuse, pardon des aveugles". Chapelle de La Clarté à Combrit in the Pays bigouden (1914), Musée de Quimper
- "Portrait d'Ernest Marché". 1889 work held in the Château-musée de Nemours
- "Bretonne au chapelet". Painting dates to 1927. Held by Musée de Quimper
- "Bigoudène au travail". An oil on canvas painting of 1926. Held in the Musée de Quimper.

== Works shown at the Salon des artistes français ==
- '"Au bord du lac". Salon des artistes français of 1908
- "La naïade Eglé". Salon des artistes français of 1909
- "Maternite". Salon des artistes français of 1913
- "Portrait du lieutenant-colonel Rimailho", Salon des artistes français of 1914
- "Le vieux terrien". Salon des artistes français of 1921
- "Coucher de soleil en Bretagne". Salon des artistes français of 1921

== Bibliography ==
- Jean-Marc Michaud : Henri Guinier (1867 - 1927), 111 pages, éditions "Le Chasse-Marée", Glénat, 2008 ISBN 9782353570522
- René Le Bihan : La route des peintres en Cornouaille, éditions Palantines, 2005
- Henri Belbéoch : Les peintres de Concarneau, éditions Palantines, 1993
