= Valérie Hermann =

French businesswoman

- Education: HEC Paris
- Occupations: MD, fashion and luxury division, EPI

Valérie Hermann is a French businesswoman. She is the managing director of the fashion and luxury division of EPI, a private investment fund based in Paris.

== Early life ==
Hermann was born in 1963 in Concarneau, Brittany.

== Career ==
After graduating from HEC Paris in 1985, she joined the Comité Colbert, an association of French companies in the luxury industry. In 1989, she was president of Jacques Fath Couture et Parfums. From 1989 to 1993, she took over the commercial management of Ercuis (silversmith) and Raynaud (porcelain). In 1996, she was appointed director of John Galliano SA. Three years later, she became director of the women's ready-to-wear collections designed by John Galliano for Christian Dior, while also serving as president of the John Galliano brand.

In 2005, she was appointed CEO of Yves Saint Laurent (now Saint Laurent Paris), which is part of the PPR group. Together with artistic director Stefano Pilati, who succeeded Tom Ford, she returned the house to profitability through the 2008 financial crisis. Hermann developed the sale of accessories, leather goods, bags and shoes. In 2008, she won the "Femmes en or" trophy in the "business" category. In 2009, Hermann was appointed to the board of directors of the PPR Foundation and was ranked 46th in the Fortune's ranking of the world's most powerful women in business.

In 2011, she left Yves Saint Laurent to become president and CEO of the New York fashion brand Reed Krakoff, part of the Coach Group. From December 2013 to 2015, she served as an independent director of Moncler S.p.A.

In 2014, she joined Ralph Lauren as president of Ralph Lauren Luxury Collections. In 2016, she was named president of global brands, a role she held until September 2019.

In December 2019, it was announced that Hermann was leaving Ralph Lauren to join private investment firm EPI as managing director of its fashion and luxury division, which includes the brands Bonpoint and J.M. Weston. In 2022, she was appointed to the board of directors of Lacoste Holding, part of MF Brands Group. She has also served on the board of the Swedish footwear brand Axel Arigato.

== Distinctions ==
Hermann was appointed a Knight of the Legion of Honour in 2006 and an Officer of the French National Order of Merit in 2011. In 2008, she received the Femmes en or award in the business category.
