= Guy Cotten =

French outdoor clothing manufacture

- Type: Privately held
- Industry: Professional Food and Safety Clothing
- Founded: 1964
- Founder: Guy Cotten
- Headquarters: Trégunc, France
- Area served: Worldwide
- Key people: Guy Cotten, founder Nadine Bertholom, CEO
- Operating income: 10,500,000 € (2005)
- Net income: 76,000 € (2005)
- Total assets: 3,530,000 € (2005)
- Website: www.guycotten.com

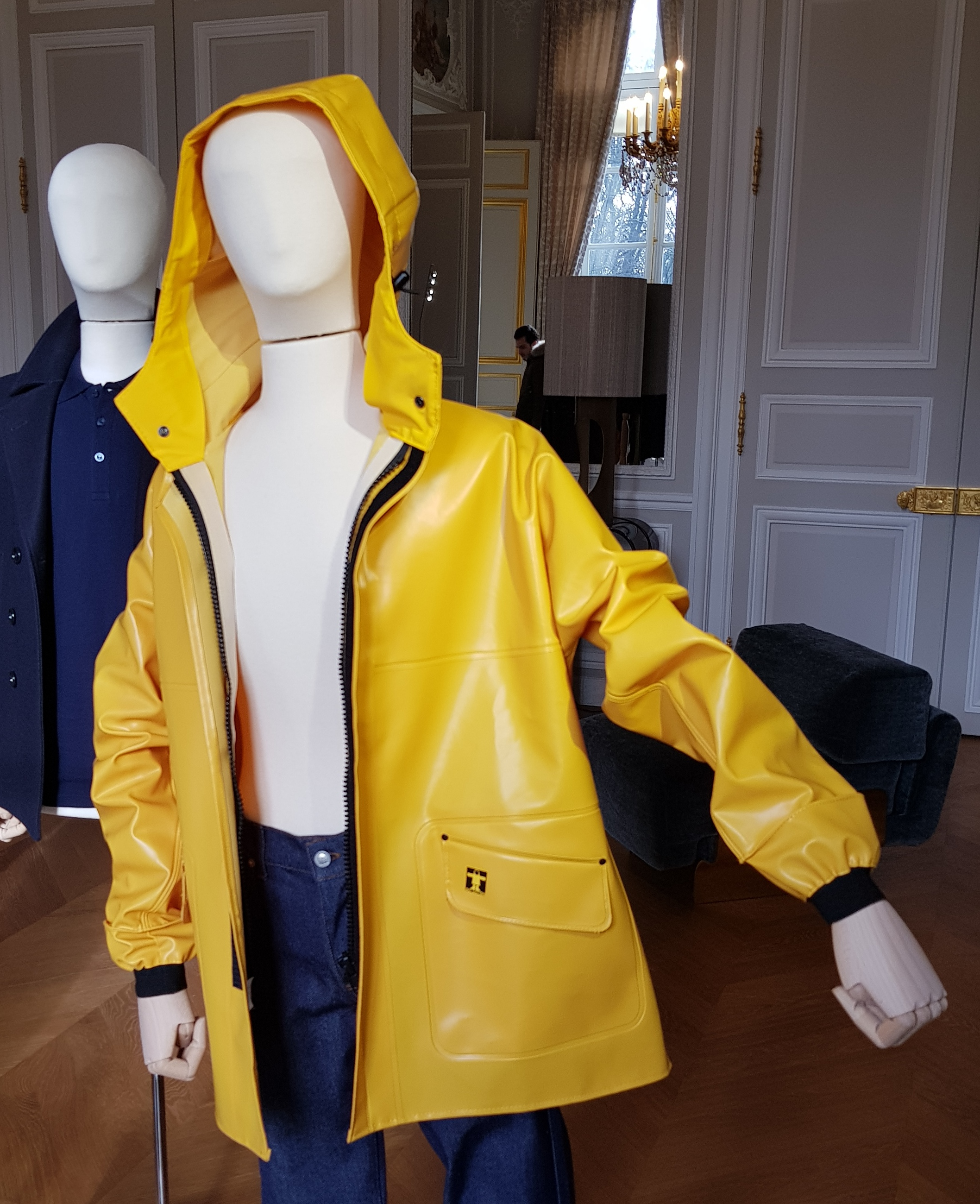

Guy Cotten is a French outdoor clothing manufacturer founded in 1964. It was founded by Guy Cotten (October 4, 1936 – April 3, 2013), and is known for its distinctive yellow oilskin items.

The company sells clothing and personal equipment in areas such as the fishing industry, all sea-related professions, outdoor, all-weather and safety clothing.

== Company history ==
Born in Saint-Yvi, Finistère, Guy Cotten was the first son of a farming family of seven children. Cotten's father died while he was seven years old; he had to work quickly and started a career as a racing cyclist, and then sold overalls in the Yvelines.

In 1964, Cotten started to sell clothes for commercial fishing at the harbour of Concarneau, and decided to launch his own workshop in order to create lighter and more resistant oilskins. He wanted to use nylon fabrics instead of the usual coated cotton. He conceived in 1966 the Rosbras, a jacket with a double velcro and a zip fastener, which became the reference item of the brand. The jacket is made of a polyester fabric covered in a PVC from the Ardèche, seamed by a high frequency welding method which results in impossibility for any water to go through the stitches. The company started with only ten workers but due to its success and to respond to the important demand a new workshop opened in Trégunc.

In 1974, Alain Le Quernec drew the little yellow man which became the emblematic brand logo and in 1981 the slogan L'abri du marin (the sailor's shelter) is added.

In 1988, the company took over Piel owned by Pirelli, specialised in survival equipment. It took the company 4 years to design and create the TPS (Thermal Protective Survival), a soft, light and isolating survival suit which saved the life of Raphaël Dinelli and Thierry Dubois, during the Vendée Globe Race in 1996.

Guy Cotten became a multinational with subsidiaries in the United Kingdom, in Spain and in North America, The company is a market leader for the sea related professions and people practicing outdoors activities. The brand is present in 5000 outlets, of which 2000 are outside France, but the Rosbras jacket, the symbol of the brand, only represents 10% of overall sales nowadays.

In 2003, Nadine Bertholom, daughter of the founder, took charge of the company.

In 2006, the company dominated the Salon nautique de Paris with its capuche Magic (Magic hood), which follows the movements of the wearer's head.

The company also sponsors competitive sailors Gilles Gahinet, Florence Arthaud and Jean Le Cam, and is a partner to the French National Team.

== Bibliography ==
- Guy Cotten, imperméable breton, Laurent Charpentier, Voiles et Voiliers n°398, April 2004 .
- Le leader mondial du ciré professionnel est breton, Le Midi Libre, 30 January 2004
