= Concarneau =

Concarneau Konk-Kerne (Breton)
- Commune
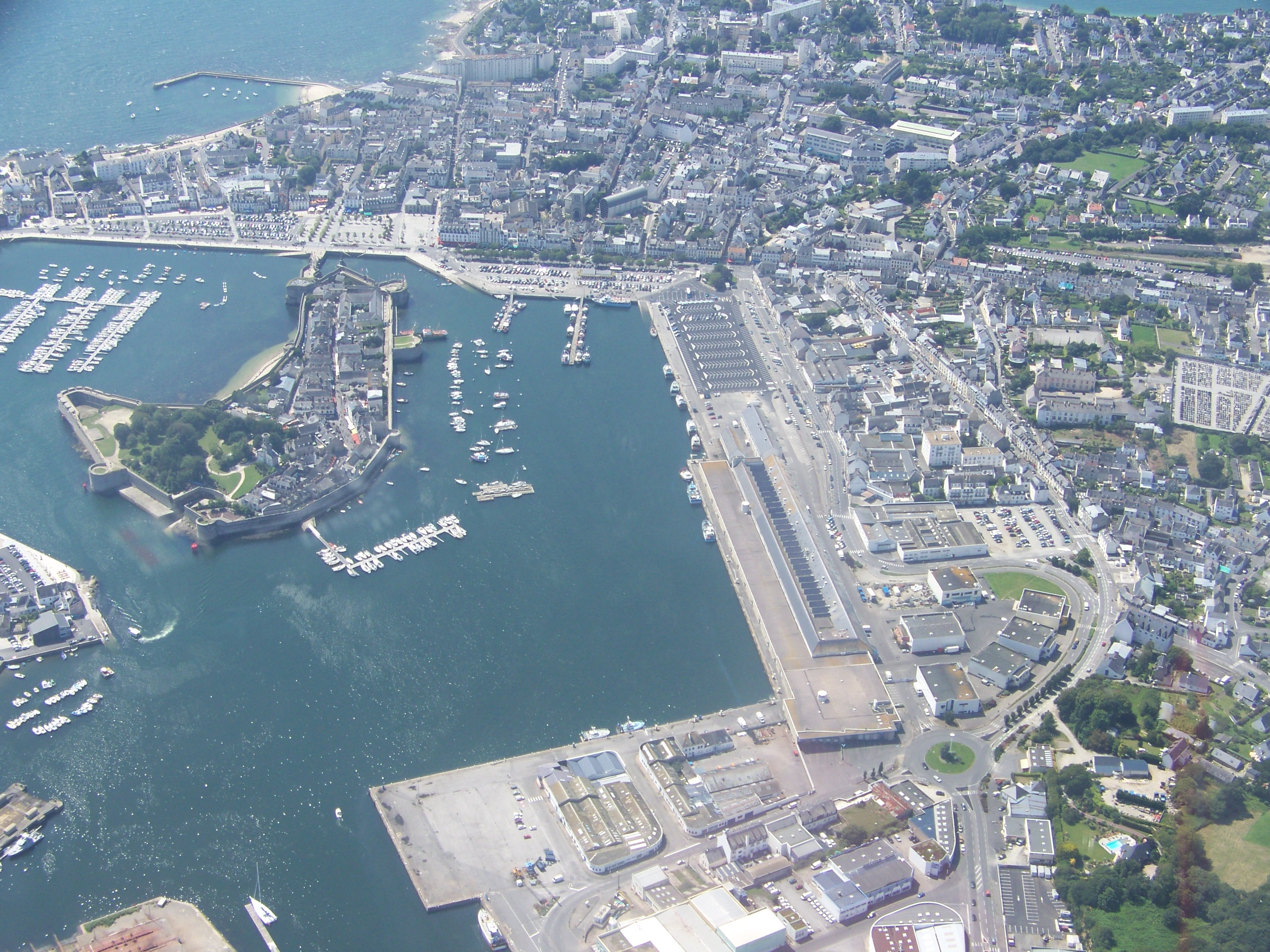
- Concarneau's harbour and centre

- Flag Coat of arms
- Location of Concarneau
- Location within France Location within Brittany
- Coordinates: 47°52′34″N 3°55′04″W
- Country: France
- Region: Brittany
- Department: Finistère
- Arrondissement: Quimper
- Canton: Concarneau
- Intercommunality: Concarneau Cornouaille Agglomération

Government
  - Mayor (2026–32): Quentin Le Gaillard
- Area^{1}: 41.08 km^{2} (15.86 sq mi)
- Highest elevation: 36 m (118 ft)
- Lowest elevation: 0 m (0 ft)
- Population (2023): 20,845
  - Density: 507.4/km^{2} (1,314/sq mi)
- Time zone: UTC+01:00 (CET)
  - Summer (DST): UTC+02:00 (CEST)
- INSEE/Postal code: 29039 /29900
- ^{1} French Land Register data, which excludes lakes, ponds, glaciers > 1 km^{2} (0.386 sq mi or 247 acres) and river estuaries.

Concarneau (Breton: Konk-Kerne, meaning "Bay of Cornouaille") is a commune in the Finistère department of Brittany in Northwestern France. Concarneau is bordered to the west by the Baie de La Forêt.

The city has two distinct areas: the modern town on the mainland and the medieval Ville Close, a walled town on a long island in the centre of the harbour. Historically, the old town was a centre of shipbuilding; its ramparts date from the 14th century. The Ville Close is now devoted to tourism with many restaurants and shops aimed at tourists. However restraint has been shown in resisting the excesses of souvenir shops. Also in the Ville Close is the fishing museum. The Ville Close is connected to the town by a bridge and at the other end a ferry to the village of Lanriec on the other side of the harbour.

== Events ==
In August the town holds the annual Fête des Filets Bleus (Festival of the Blue Nets). The festival, named after the traditional blue nets of Concarneau's fishing fleet, is a celebration of Breton and pan-Celtic culture. Such festivals can occur throughout Brittany but the Filets Bleus is one of the oldest and largest, attracting in excess of a thousand participants in traditional dress with many times that number of observers. In 2005, the 100th festival was celebrated.

== Literature ==
Concarneau was the setting for Belgian mystery writer Georges Simenon's 1931 novel Le Chien jaune (The Yellow Dog), featuring his celebrated sleuth Maigret.

== Economy ==
Fishing, particularly for tuna, has long been the primary economic activity in Concarneau. The Les Mouettes d'Arvor is one of the last traditional canning factories in Concarneau. Concarneau is one of the biggest fishing ports in France. Since the 1980s, other industries have arisen, such as boat construction and summer tourism.

The Ville Close separates the working port from the yacht basin.

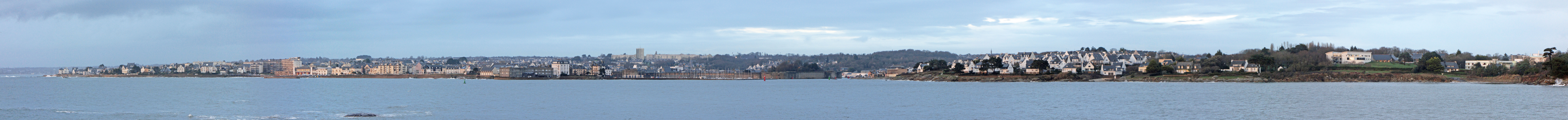
Concarneau

== Demographics ==
Inhabitants of Concarneau are called in French Concarnois (masculine) and Concarnoises (feminine). In 1959, Concarneau absorbed the former commune Lanriec.

Historical population

Year	Pop.	±% p.a.
1793	2,000	—
1800	1,561	−3.48%
1806	1,608	+0.50%
1821	1,511	−0.41%
1831	1,843	+2.01%
1836	1,816	−0.29%
1841	1,984	+1.79%
1846	2,100	+1.14%
1851	2,289	+1.74%
1856	2,372	+0.71%
1861	2,767	+3.13%
1866	3,555	+5.14%
1872	4,463	+3.86%
1876	4,745	+1.54%
1881	5,191	+1.81%
1886	5,684	+1.83%
1891	5,991	+1.06%
1896	6,500	+1.64%
1901	7,635	+3.27%

Year	Pop.	±% p.a.
1906	8,007	+0.96%
1911	7,263	−1.93%
1921	6,170	−1.62%
1926	5,995	−0.57%
1931	5,815	−0.61%
1936	5,878	+0.22%
1946	10,519	+5.99%
1954	10,341	−0.21%
1962	15,907	+5.53%
1968	17,801	+1.89%
1975	18,759	+0.75%
1982	17,984	−0.60%
1990	18,630	+0.44%
1999	19,453	+0.48%
2007	20,280	+0.52%
2012	18,557	−1.76%
2017	19,050	+0.53%
2023	20,845	+1.51%

Source: EHESS and INSEE (1968–2023)

== Breton language ==
In 2008, 2.16% of primary-school children attended bilingual schools, where Breton language is taught alongside French.

== Sport ==
The football club US Concarneau is based in the town.

== Personalities ==
- Michel Desjoyeaux, navigator
- Samantha Davies, sailor
- Guy Cotten, founder of a clothes factory
- Stéphane Guivarc'h, French footballer, won the FIFA World Cup 1998 with the French national side
- Théophile Deyrolle and Alfred Guillou, founders of the Concarneau Art Colony.
- Valérie Hermann, President of Ralph Lauren

== International relations ==
Twinned towns:

- Bielefeld, Germany since 1969
- M'bour, Senegal since 1974
- Penzance, United Kingdom since 1982

== Gallery ==
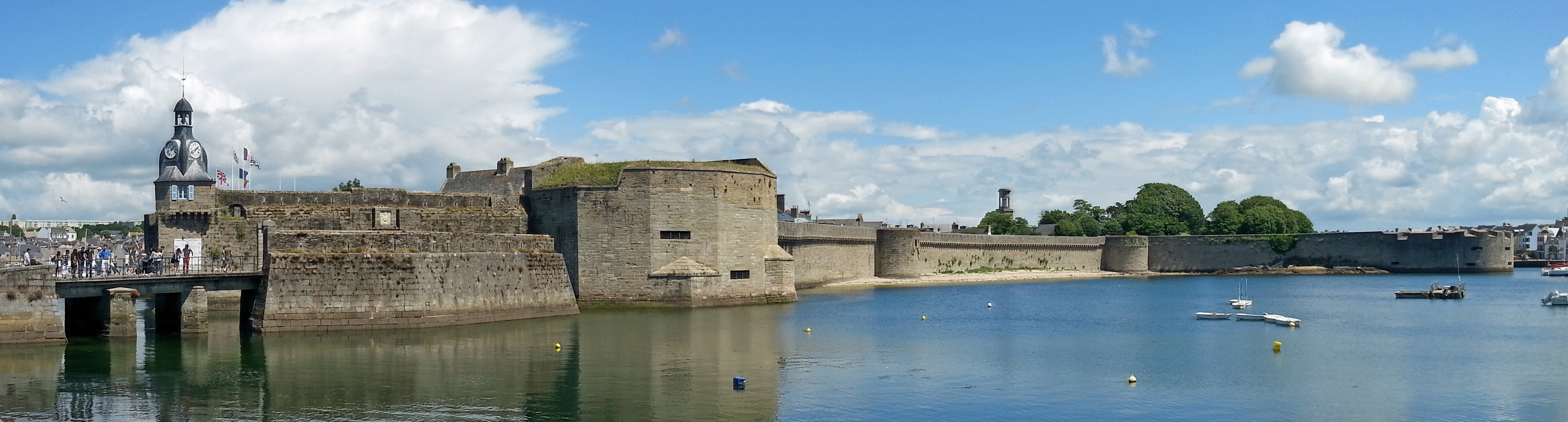
The medieval Ville Close

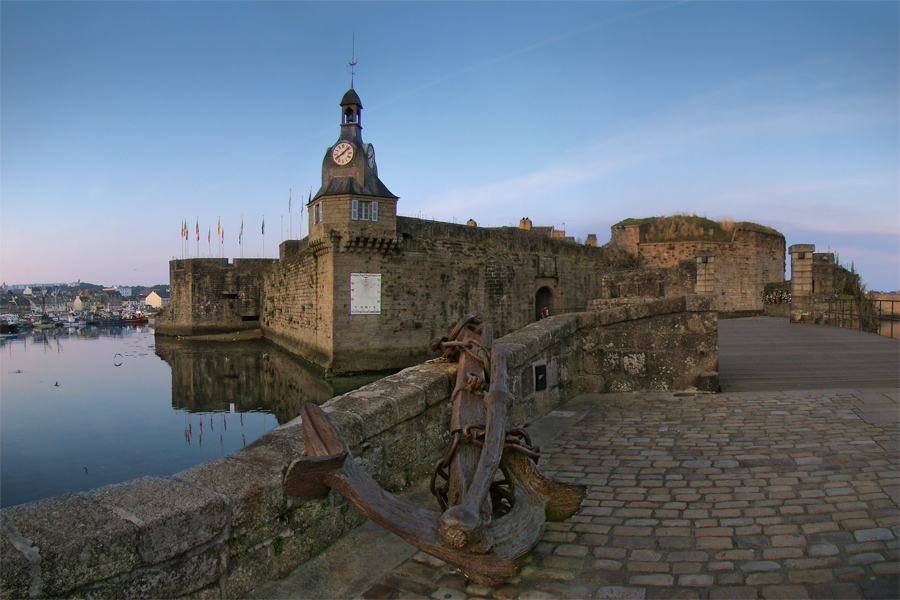
The medieval Ville Close

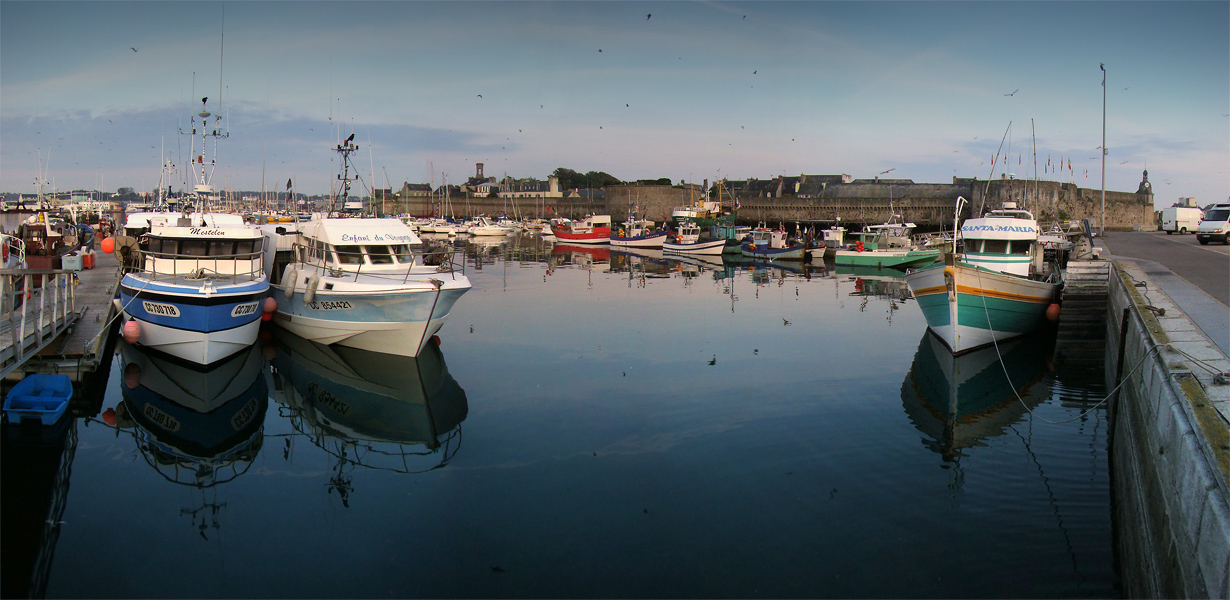
The commercial harbour

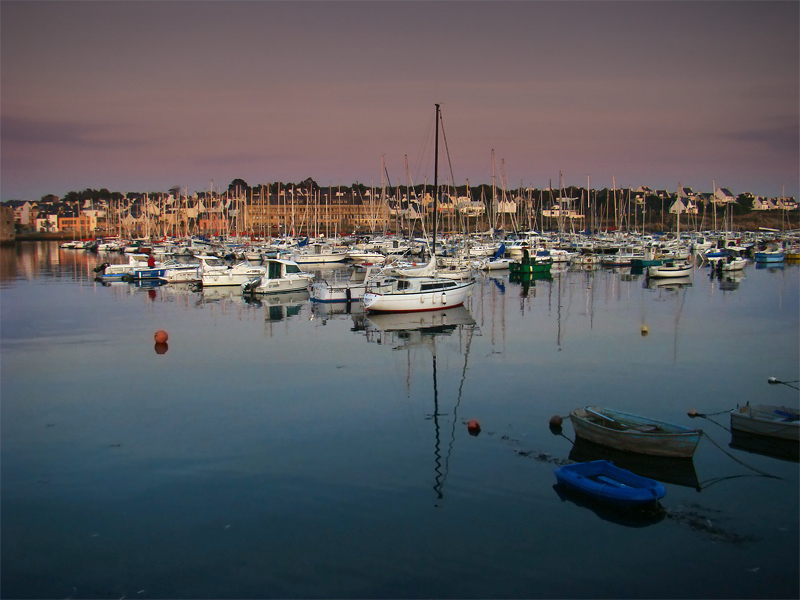
The yachting harbour

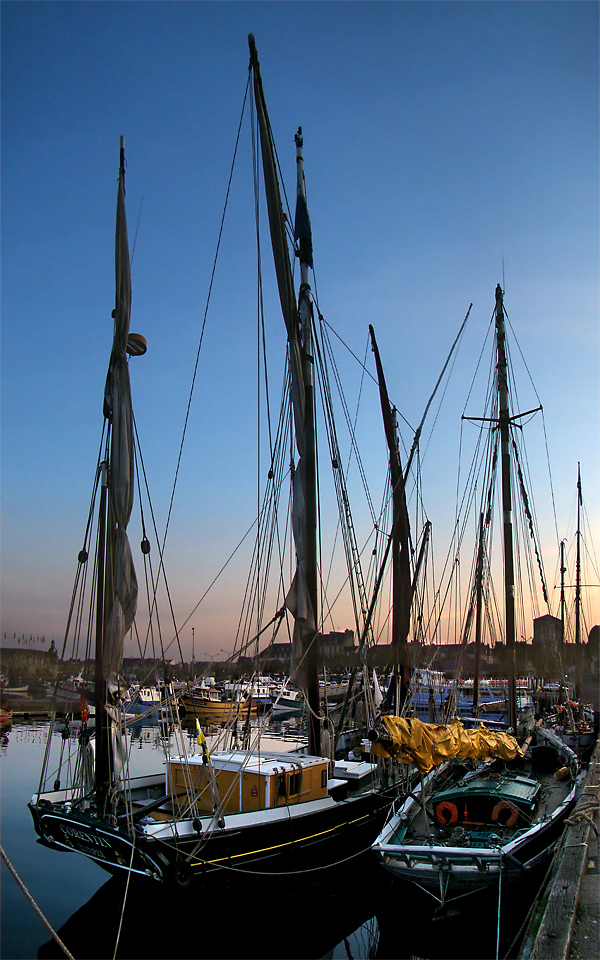
At dusk

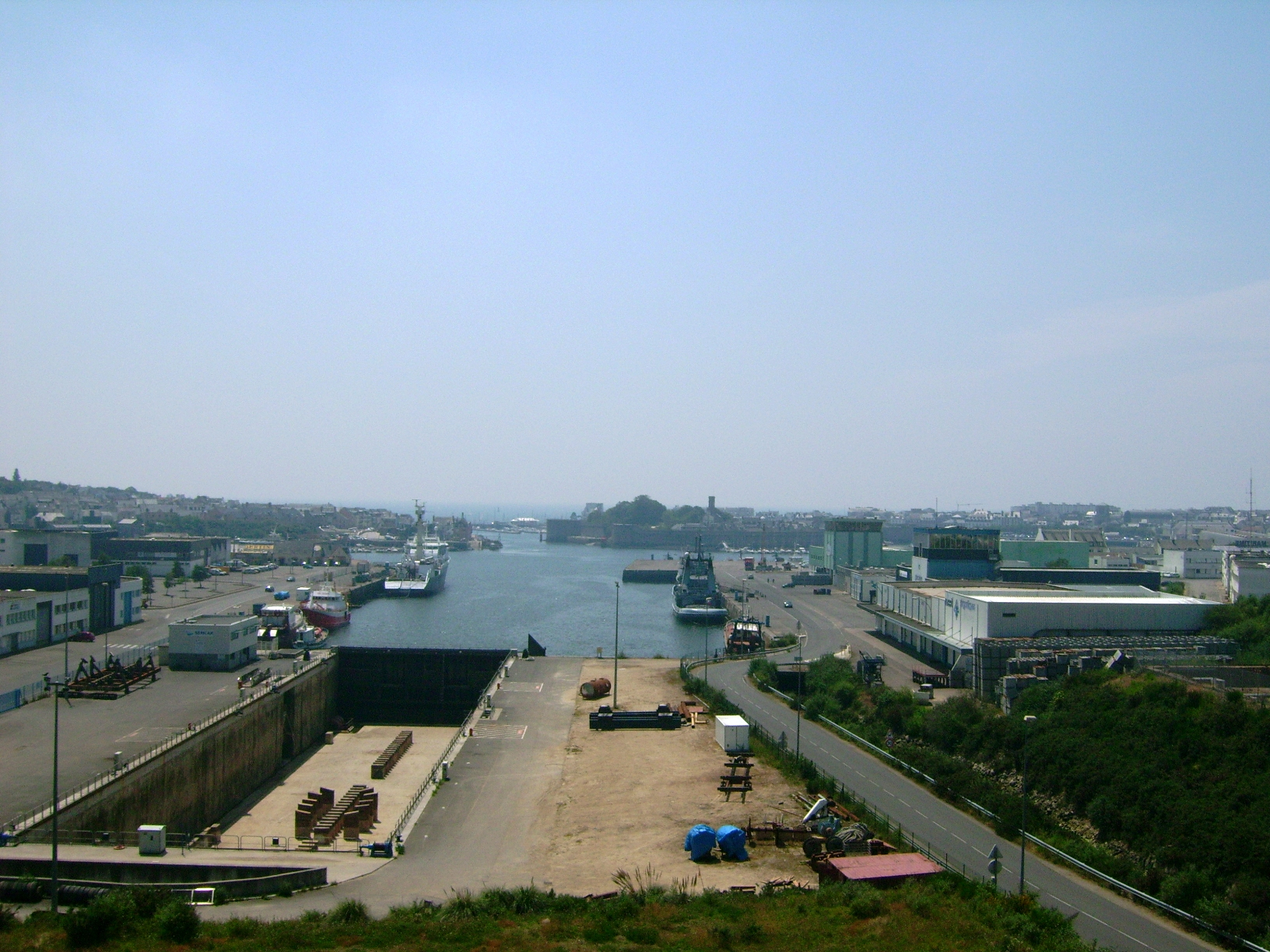
The port

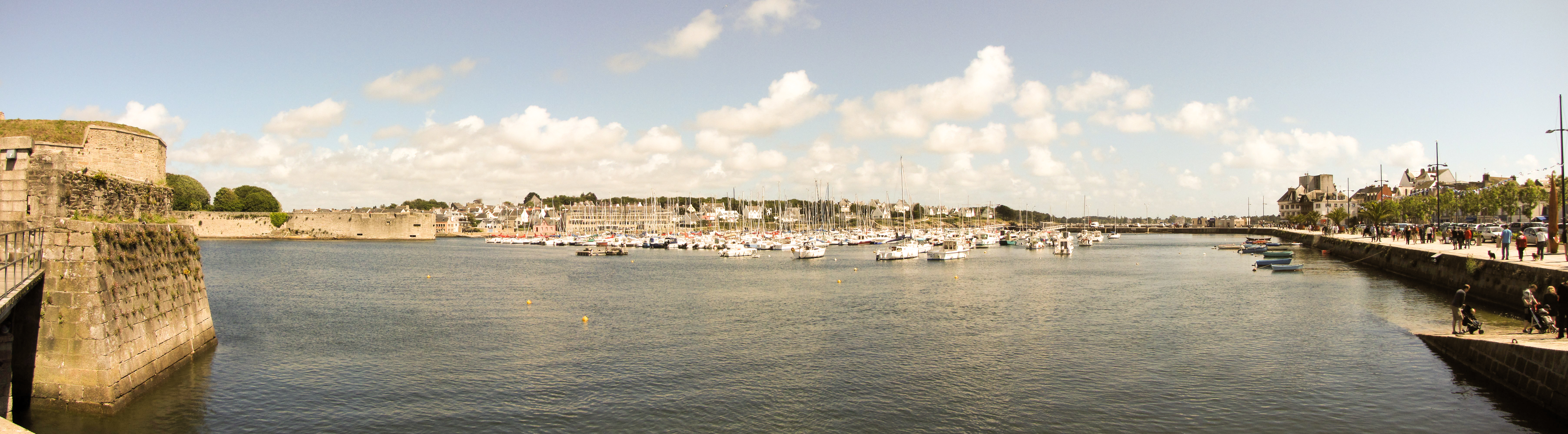
The yachting harbor

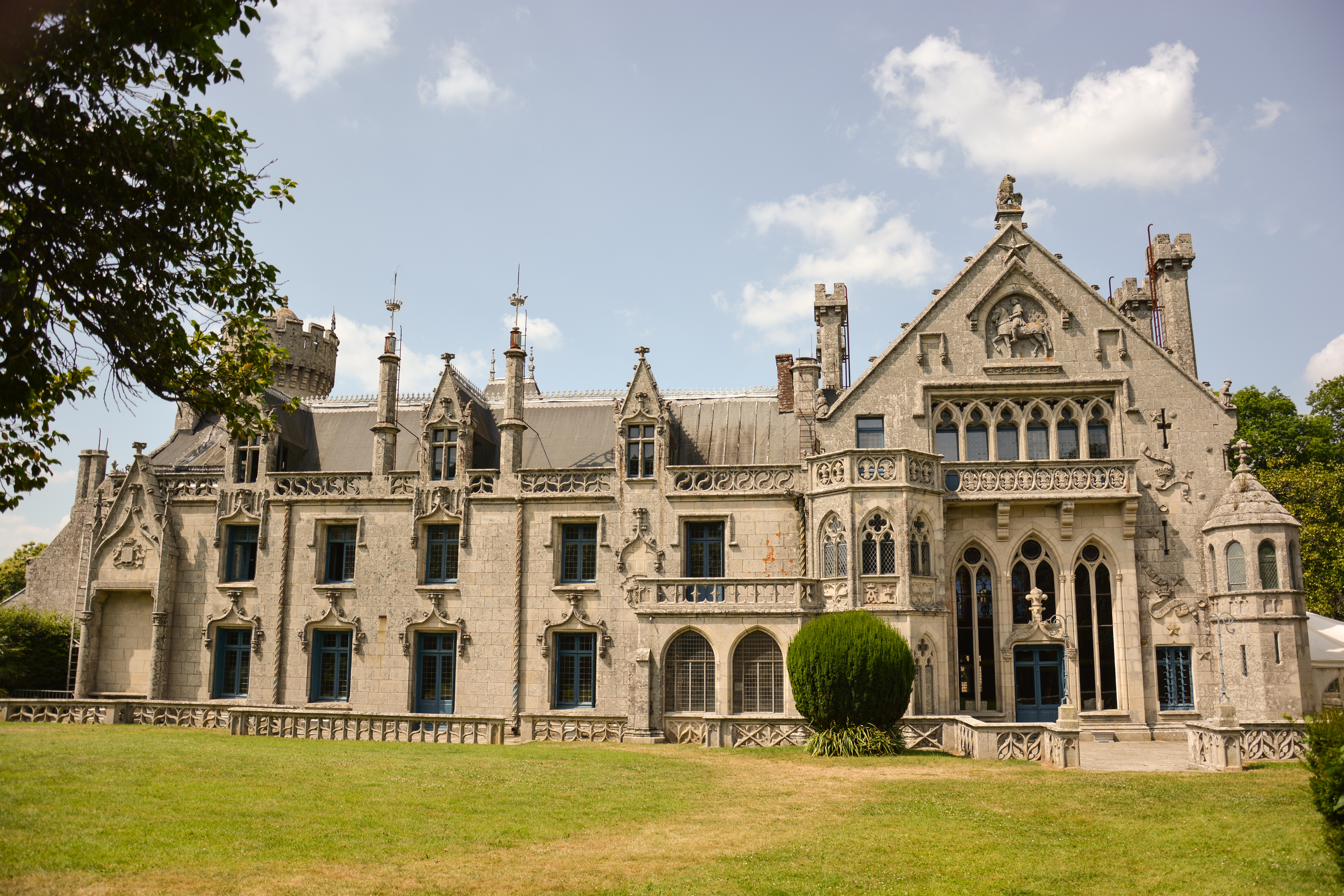
Château de Kériolet

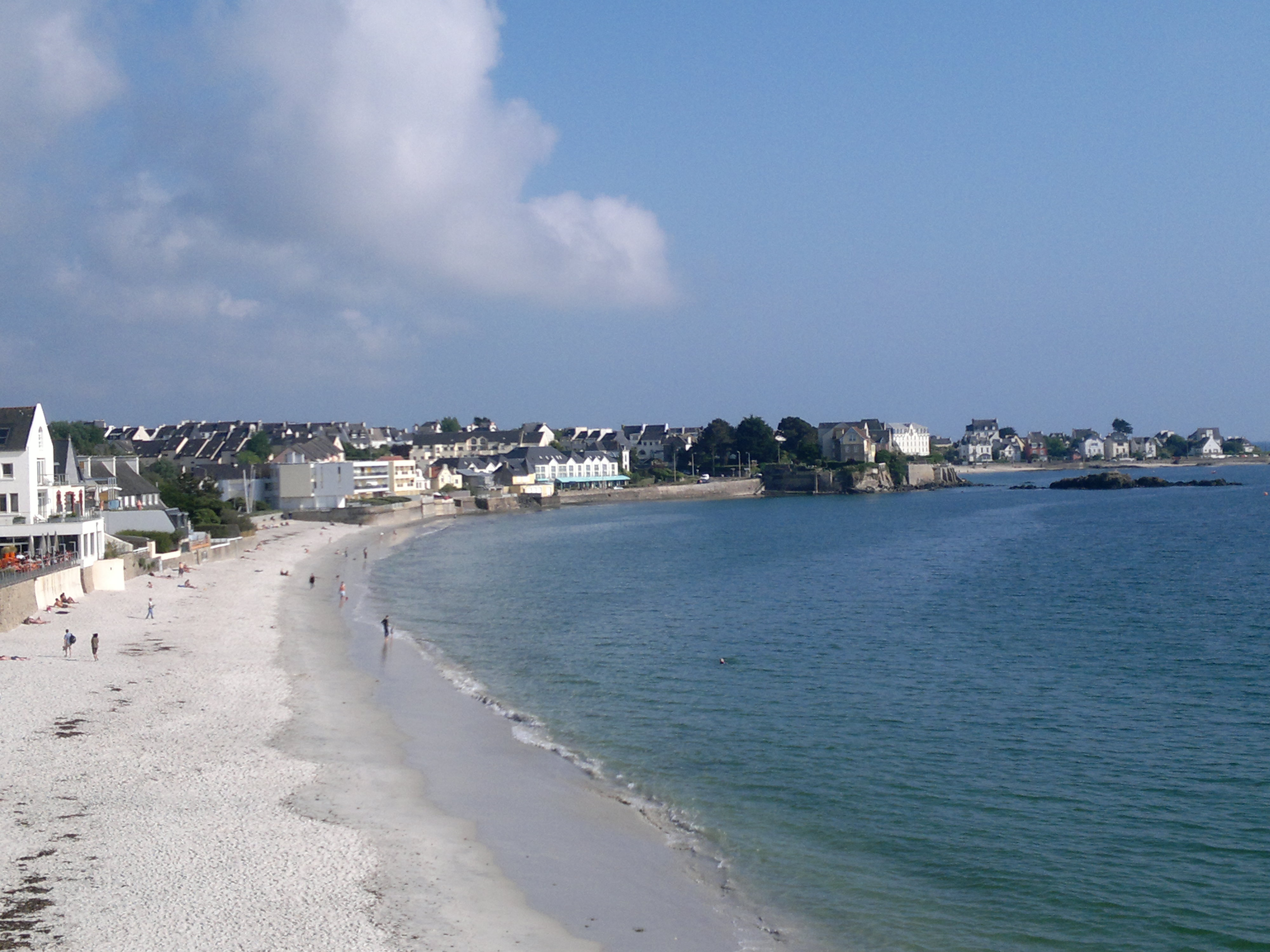
Les Sables Blancs

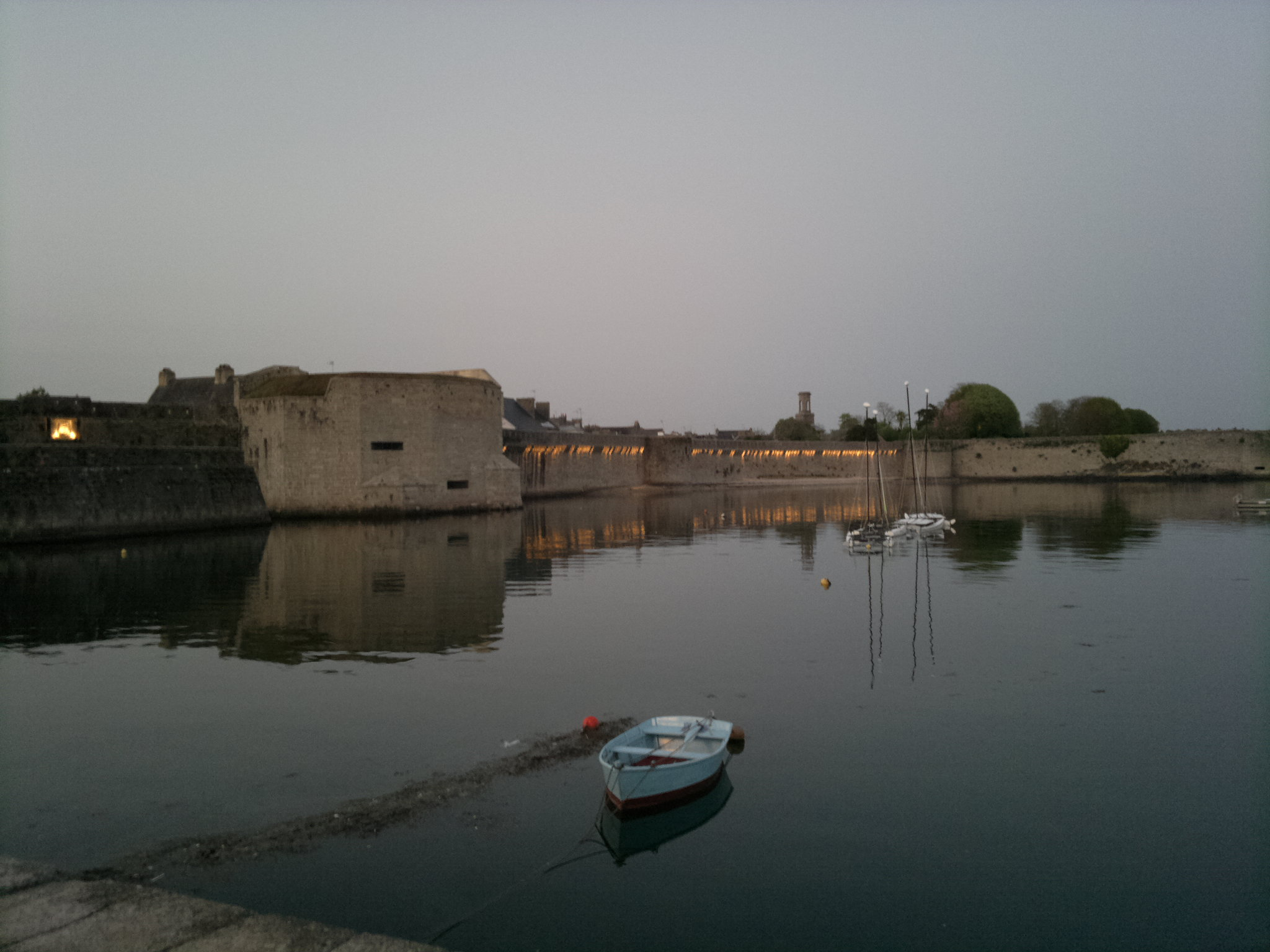
The Ville Close

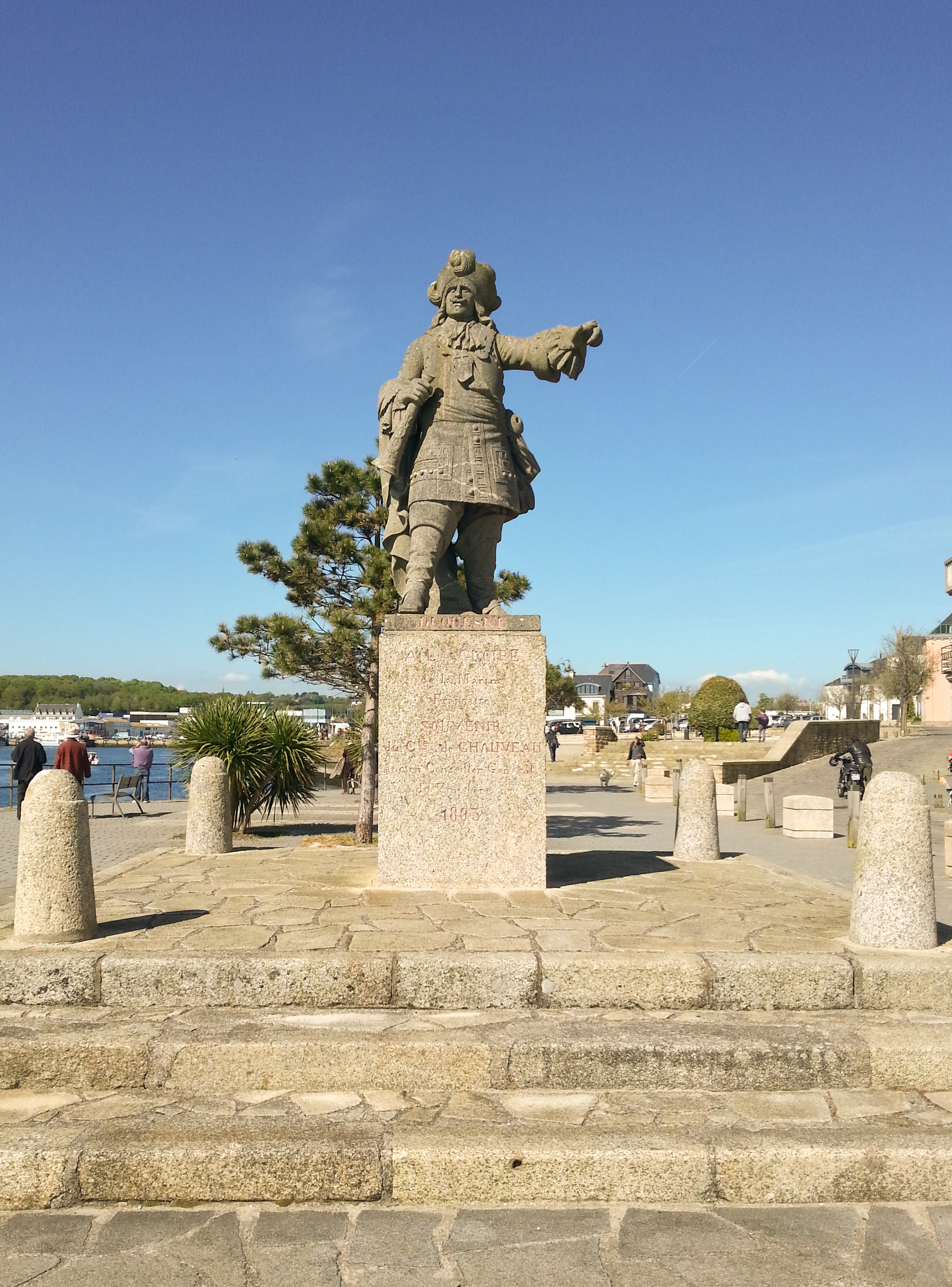
Abraham Duquesne

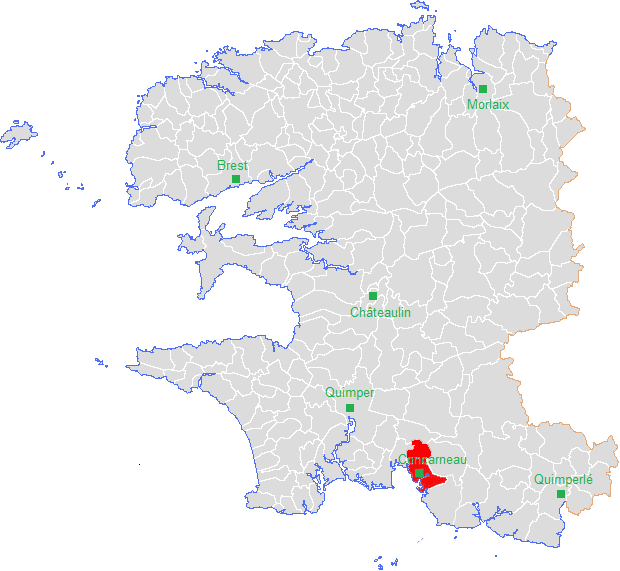
Concarneau's location in Finistère

== Climate ==
Climate data for Concarneau-Trégunc (2003–2020 normals, extremes 2003–present)
Month	Jan	Feb	Mar	Apr	May	Jun	Jul	Aug	Sep	Oct	Nov	Dec	Year
Record high °C (°F)	15.4 (59.7)	17.8 (64.0)	23.4 (74.1)	25.2 (77.4)	30.0 (86.0)	32.7 (90.9)	37.2 (99.0)	35.1 (95.2)	31.3 (88.3)	26.8 (80.2)	19.5 (67.1)	16.8 (62.2)	37.2 (99.0)
Mean daily maximum °C (°F)	10.3 (50.5)	10.4 (50.7)	12.4 (54.3)	15.3 (59.5)	17.8 (64.0)	20.8 (69.4)	22.2 (72.0)	21.7 (71.1)	20.5 (68.9)	17.2 (63.0)	13.5 (56.3)	11.0 (51.8)	16.1 (61.0)
Daily mean °C (°F)	7.6 (45.7)	7.3 (45.1)	8.9 (48.0)	11.2 (52.2)	13.7 (56.7)	16.7 (62.1)	18.1 (64.6)	17.6 (63.7)	16.3 (61.3)	13.9 (57.0)	10.5 (50.9)	8.2 (46.8)	12.5 (54.5)
Mean daily minimum °C (°F)	4.9 (40.8)	4.2 (39.6)	5.4 (41.7)	7.2 (45.0)	9.6 (49.3)	12.6 (54.7)	13.9 (57.0)	13.5 (56.3)	12.1 (53.8)	10.6 (51.1)	7.6 (45.7)	5.4 (41.7)	8.9 (48.0)
Record low °C (°F)	−6.0 (21.2)	−6.4 (20.5)	−4.8 (23.4)	−1.9 (28.6)	0.4 (32.7)	3.6 (38.5)	6.9 (44.4)	6.3 (43.3)	3.8 (38.8)	0.8 (33.4)	−3.0 (26.6)	−4.5 (23.9)	−6.4 (20.5)
Average precipitation mm (inches)	102.6 (4.04)	83.5 (3.29)	63.3 (2.49)	56.5 (2.22)	52.7 (2.07)	46.1 (1.81)	50.7 (2.00)	55.5 (2.19)	41.5 (1.63)	92.8 (3.65)	103.7 (4.08)	105.0 (4.13)	853.9 (33.62)
Average precipitation days (≥ 1.0 mm)	14.8	11.9	11.7	9.9	8.8	7.1	8.4	8.5	6.8	11.9	13.8	14.9	128.5
Source: Meteociel

== See also ==
- Communes of the Finistère department
- Walled town of Concarneau
- Calypso (ship)
- Lionel Floch
- Fernand-Marie-Eugène Le Gout-Gérard
- Henri Alphonse Barnoin
- Henri Guinier
- Sardine workers' strike
