= Lionel Floch =

French painter (1895–1972)

Lionel Floch was born in Quimper in 1895 and died in 1972. He was a French painter, engraver, and designer.

== Biography ==
Floch was the son of a naval officer and studied at the "Tour d'Auvergne" school in Quimper. After being mobilized during the 1914-1918 war, he studied painting under Théophile Deyrolle at Concarneau. He was also influenced by Lucien Simon. He had little love of abstract painting, concentrating on figurative works many depicting scenes of life in the "Pays Bigouden" and the area around Cap Sizun (Baie de Douarnenez, la baie d'Audierne, la Pointe du Raz.etc.). He painted the Breton pardons, scenes at the port and people collecting seaweed ("Le ramassage du goémon"). From 1923 to 1948, he worked as the registrar of Pont-Croix but continued to paint and was a leading figure in the Quimper intellectual and artistic community during these years, his friends including Jean Moulin and Max Jacob. Floch was anti-militarist, anti-clerical and anti-Gaullist. He executed portraits of Jacob and Moulin, who both died at the hands of the Germans. Moulin died on a train on the way to a concentration camp in Germany and Jacob died at the Drancy camp awaiting deportation. In 1927, Floch showed his works at the Saluden Gallery in Brest. He then exhibited there regularly, and at the Lécuyer Gallery in Quimper. He also exhibited regularly at the French Artists Salon and in the Autumn Salon. He was subsequently transferred as the registrar of Grasse and Chinon until finally retiring to Quimper in 1958 where he spent the rest of his life. In his final years he had a change of mind and became interested in abstract painting.

== Some of his works ==
His works were numerous and include:-

- Un pardon en Pays Bigouden. He completed this oil painting in around 1934 and it is held in the collections of the Quimper Musée des beaux-arts.
- La Cornouaille, sa mer, ses pardons, ses sites. This painting is also held by the Quimper Musée des beaux-arts.
- Le ramassage du goémon. This oil on canvas work depicting seaweed pickers is in private hands.
- He also helped decorate the "Salle des fêtes" in Douarnenez
- He also completed a painting for the Renault sales room in Quimper.
- Floch was also commissioned to execute paintings for Senator Astor's manor at Kérazan and for the Pascal brother's hotel at Quimper. He also tried his hand making pottery for the faïencerie Henriot and executing and designing wood carvings.

== Notes ==
1."La pêche à la sardine", one of Floch's paintings, was used to decorate sardine tins.

2. In 2007 the "maison du marquisat" of Pont-Croix and the "Musée bigouden" of Pont-l'Abbé staged a retrospective of Floch's work.
