= Théophile Deyrolle =

French painter

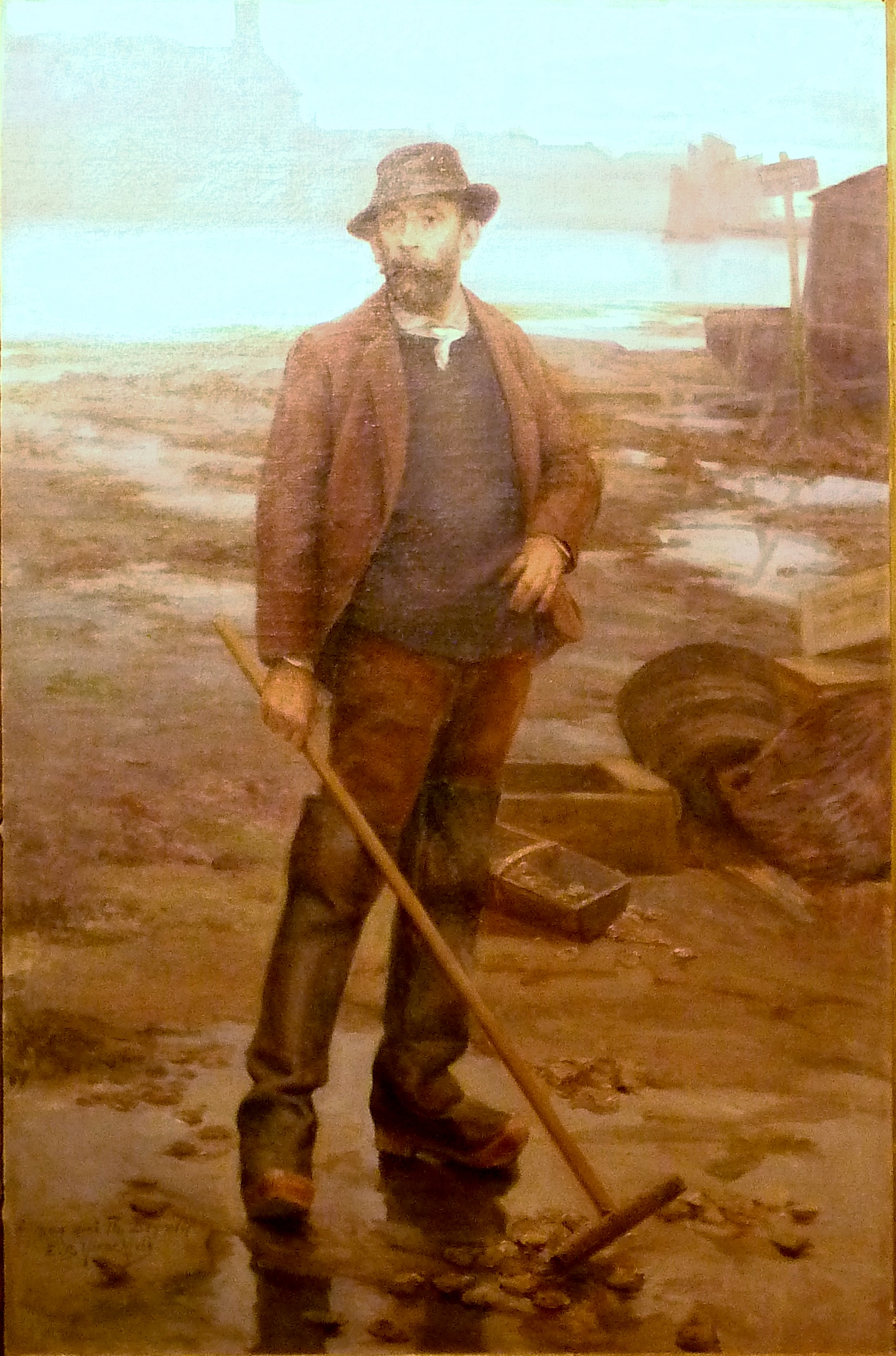
Théophile Deyrolle in an oyster bed; by Emil-Benediktoff Hirschfeld

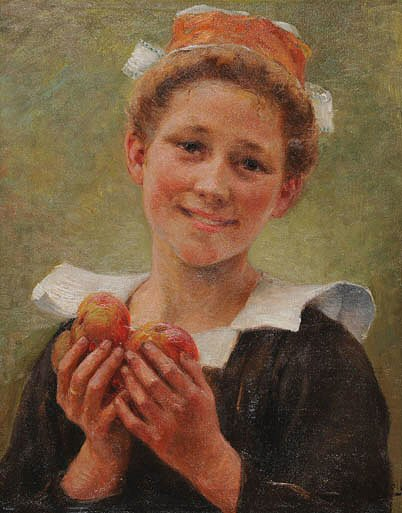
Young Breton Woman with Apples (date unknown)

Théophile-Louis Deyrolle (16 December 1844, Paris – 14 December 1923, Concarneau) was a French painter, illustrator and ceramicist.

== Biography ==
He came from a family of entomologists and naturalists who owned a well-known taxidermy shop in Paris. Achille and Émile Deyrolle were among his relatives. Originally, he studied architecture at the École des Beaux-arts. While working for Joseph Auguste Émile Vaudremer, he met Alfred Guillou who convinced him to give up architecture for painting. He then became a student and assistant in the studios of Alexandre Cabanel and William Bouguereau.

In 1863, due perhaps to his family's reputation, he was able to travel to Armenia and Georgia on a commission from the Société de Géographie. In addition to touring the monuments, he visited the Laz, gaining their trust and producing drawings and descriptions that were published in Le Tour du Monde - Nouveau Journal Des Voyages over the course of several years beginning in 1869. Some of his artist friends at Concarneau also published their versions of his drawings.

In 1871, he and Guillou left for Concarneau, Alfred's hometown, with nothing more than they could carry. The next year, he married Alfred's sister, Suzanne (1846-1933), who was also an artist, becoming a Breton by adoption. Together, they founded the artists' colony there.

Once he became settled there. he began work for HB de Quimper, decorating plates and vases with Japanese motifs. He was also attracted to the life of the port and the maritime trades and became a part-time fishmonger. Most of his paintings deal with the life of the harbor. Many inns and hotels in the area are decorated with his landscapes and pastoral scenes.

== See also ==
- Lionel Floch

== Selected paintings ==
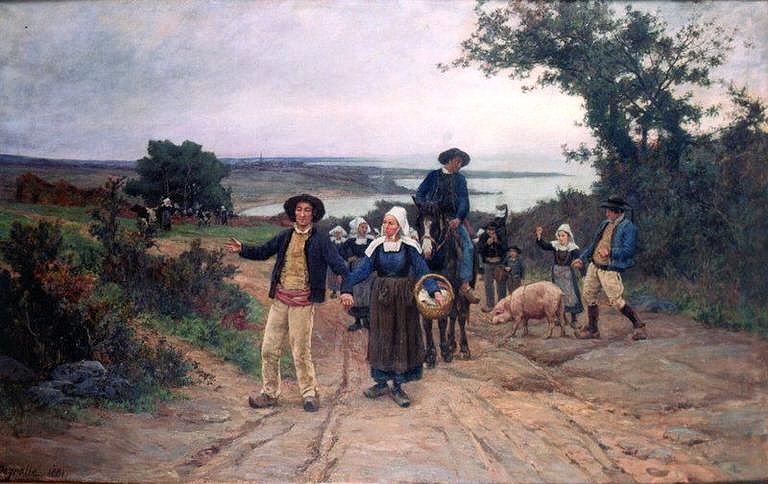
"Arrival of the Pardon at Fouesnant"

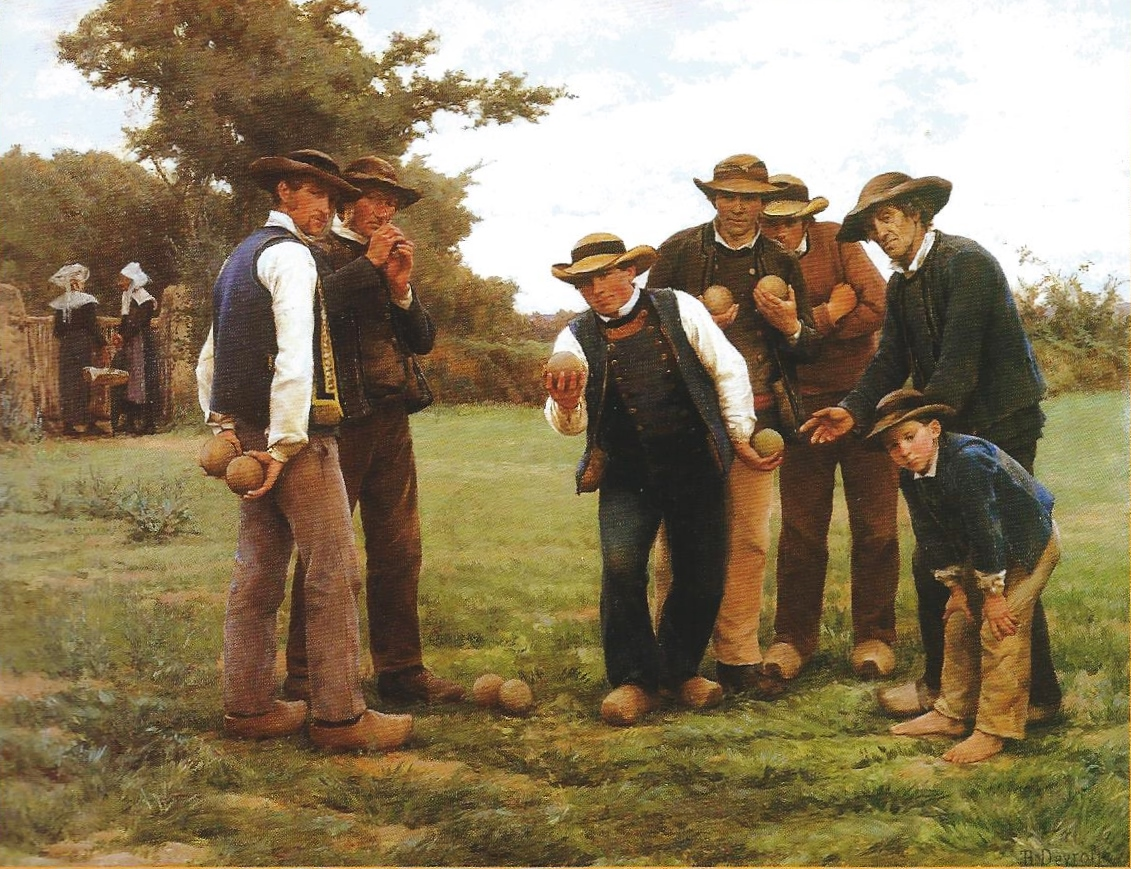
"The Boule players"

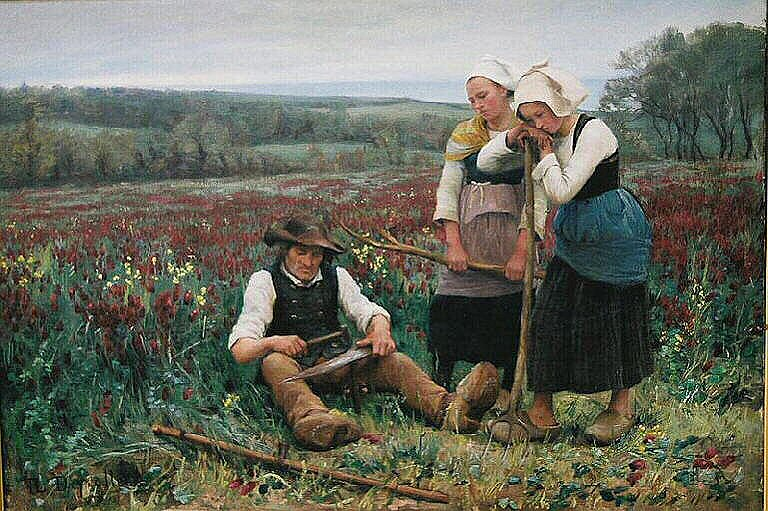
"Tedders Resting".

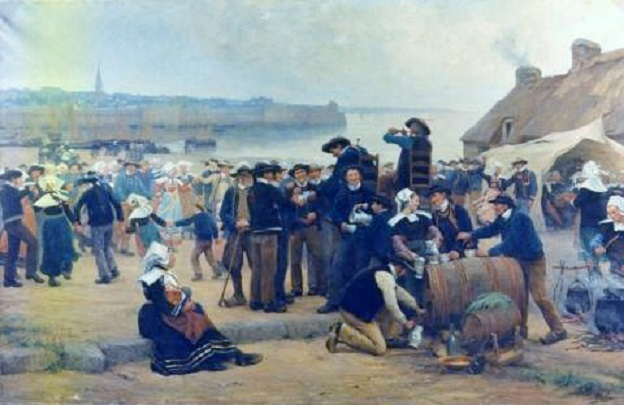
"The Pardon in Brittany".
