= Walled town of Concarneau =

- Ville close de Concarneau
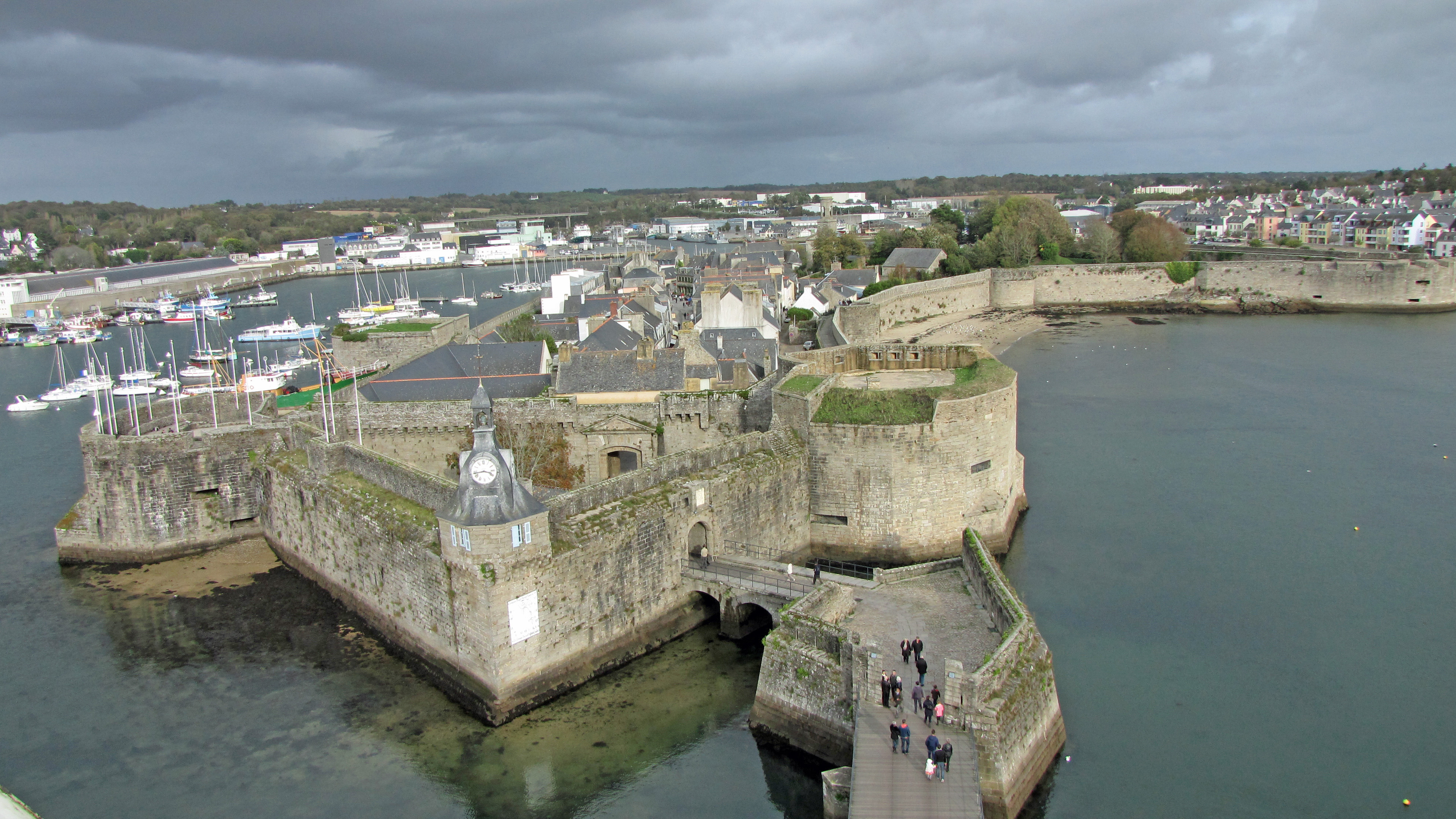
- Walled town of Concarneau (2014)

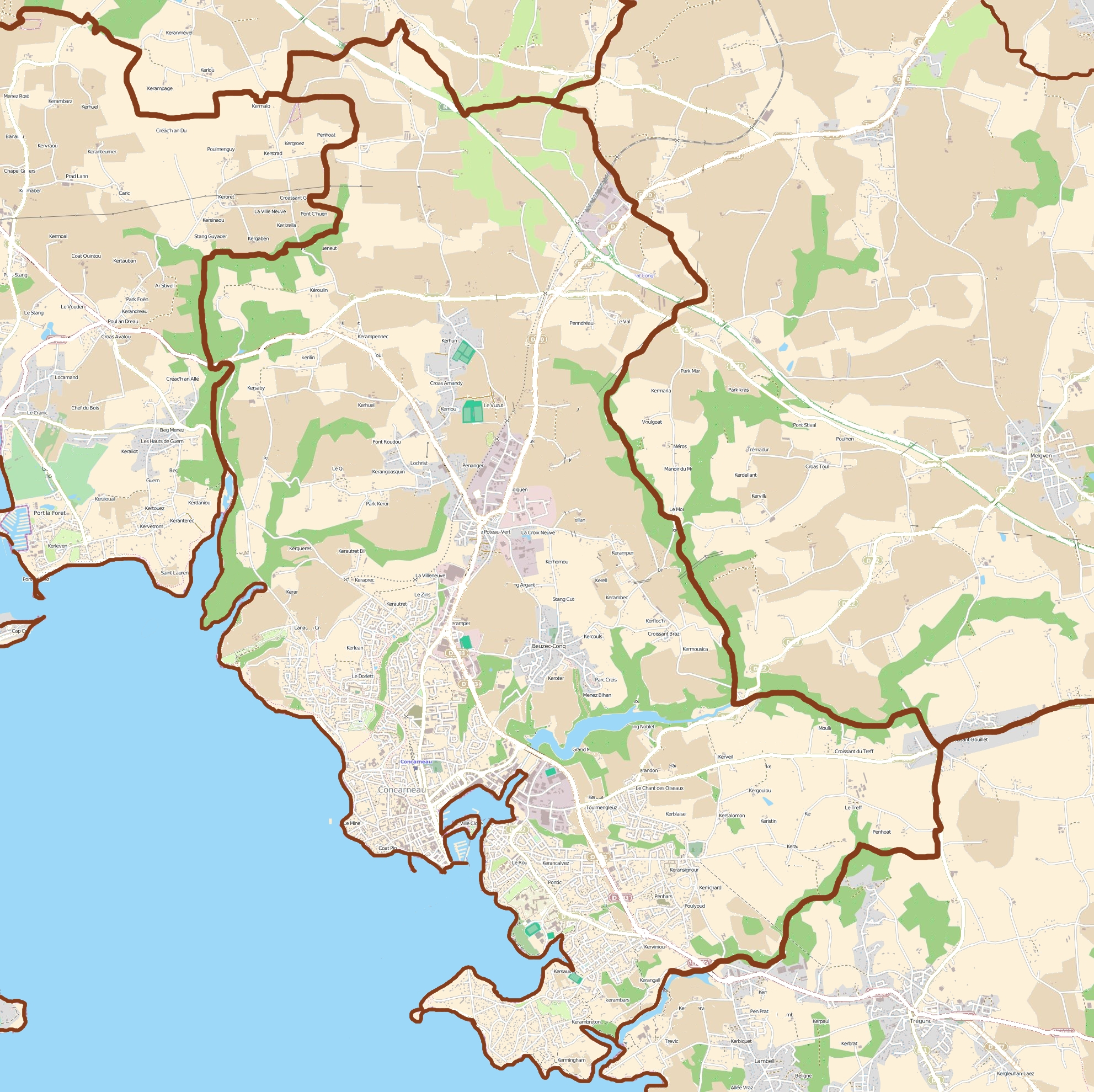
- Location within Concarneau

General information
- Type: Walled town
- Location: Concarneau, France
- Coordinates: 47.871674°N 3.916266°W
- Elevation: 1 m (3 ft)
- Construction started: 15th century 16th century

Design and construction
- Architect: Sébastien Le Prestre de Vauban

Website
- Official website

The Walled town of Concarneau is a walled town built in the 15th and 16th century in Concarneau.

== Museums ==
- Musée de la pêche de Concarneau (Museum of Fishing)

== Gallery ==
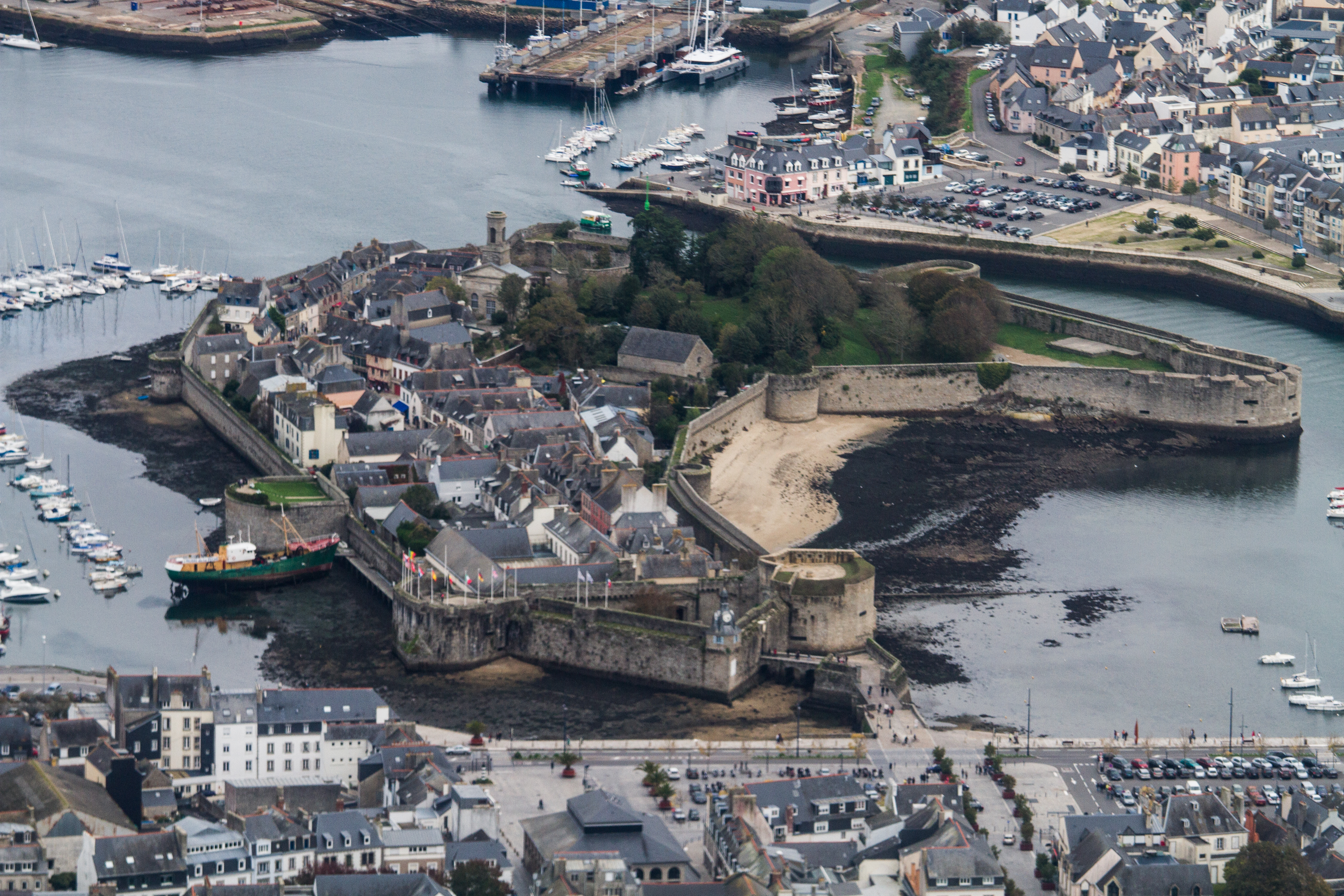
The medieval walled town (overfly).

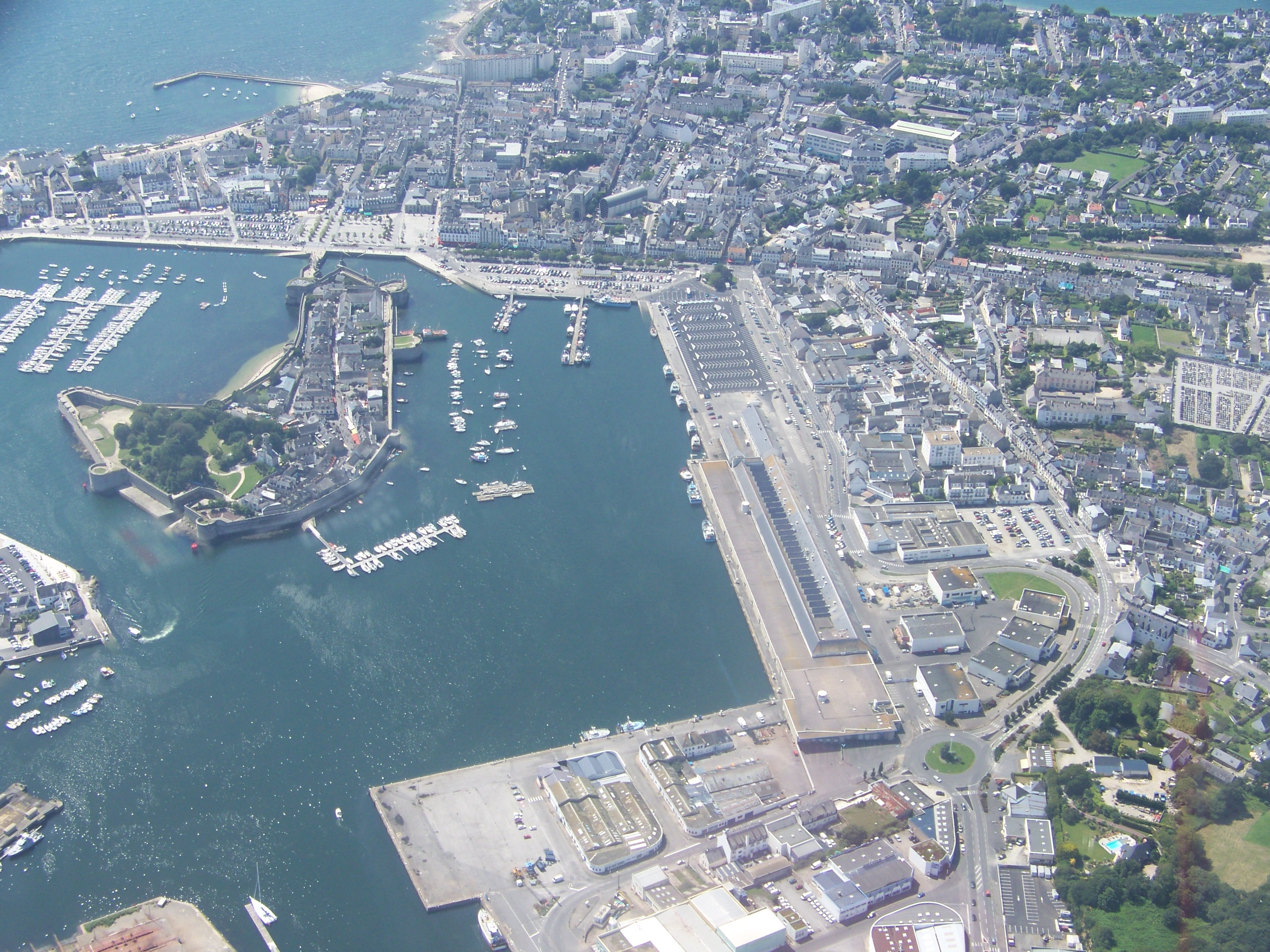
The medieval walled town and Concarneau (overfly).

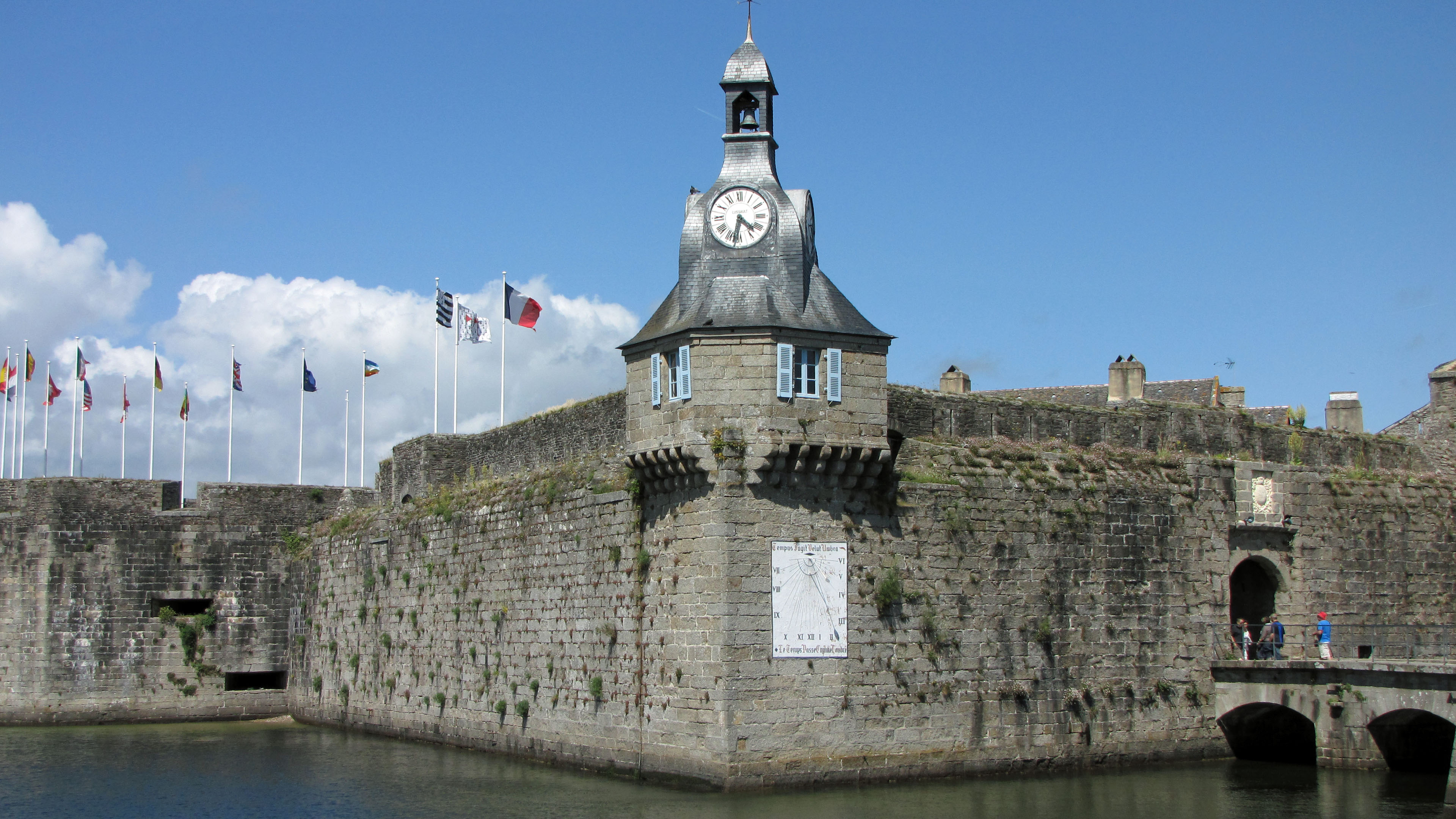
The medieval walled town.

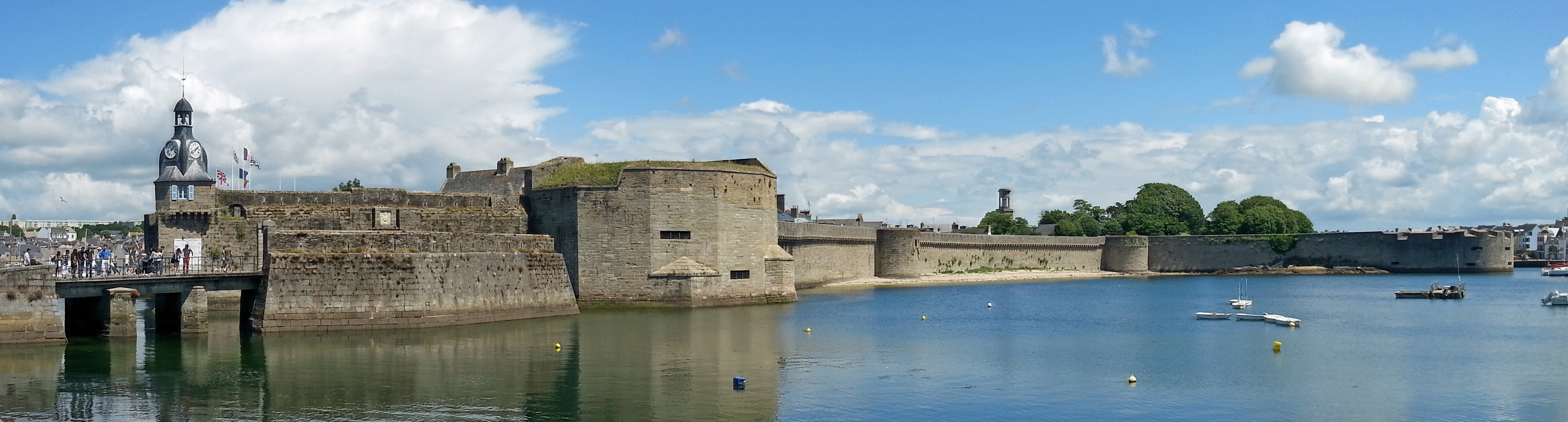
The medieval walled town.

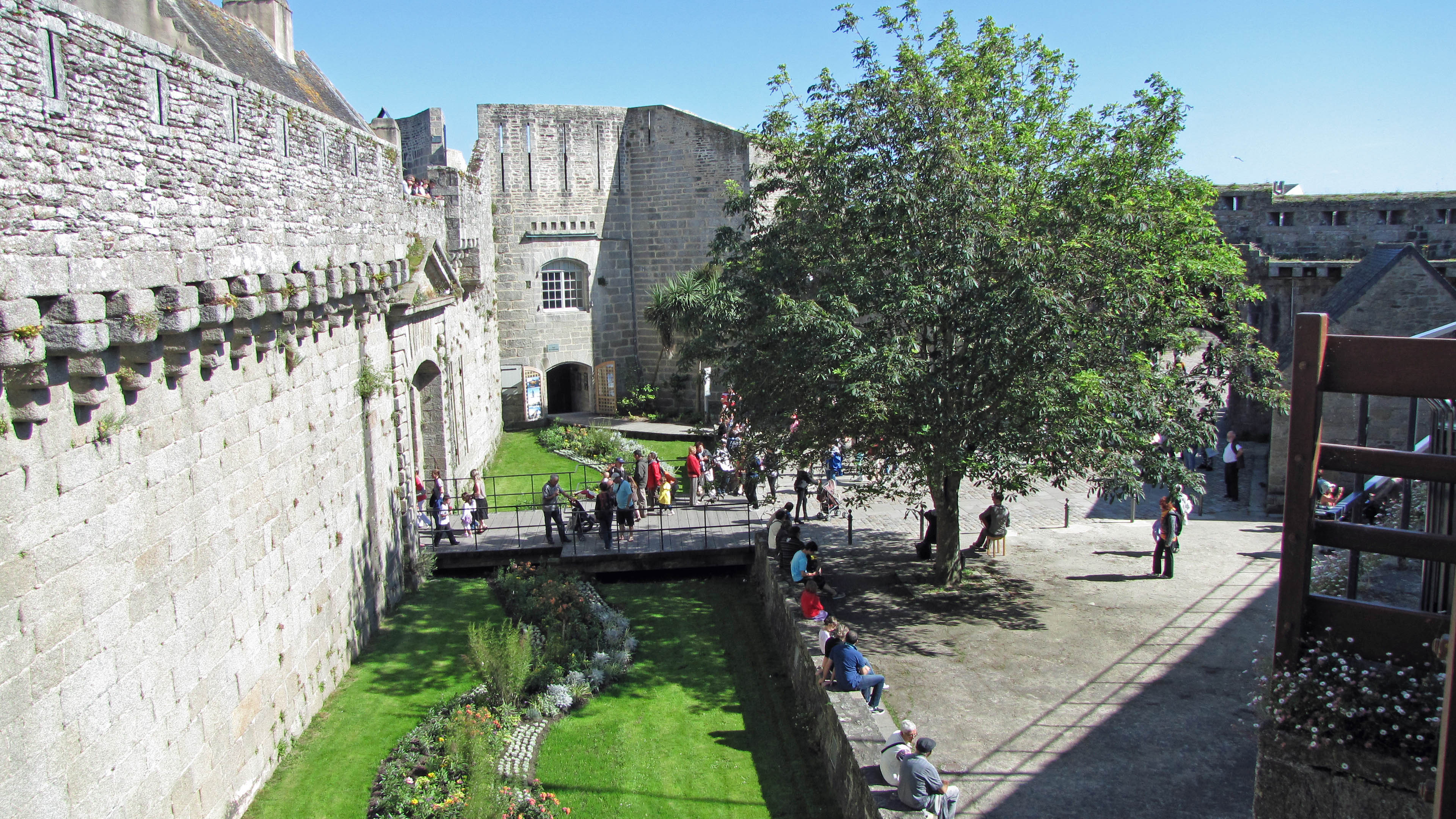
Inside the city.

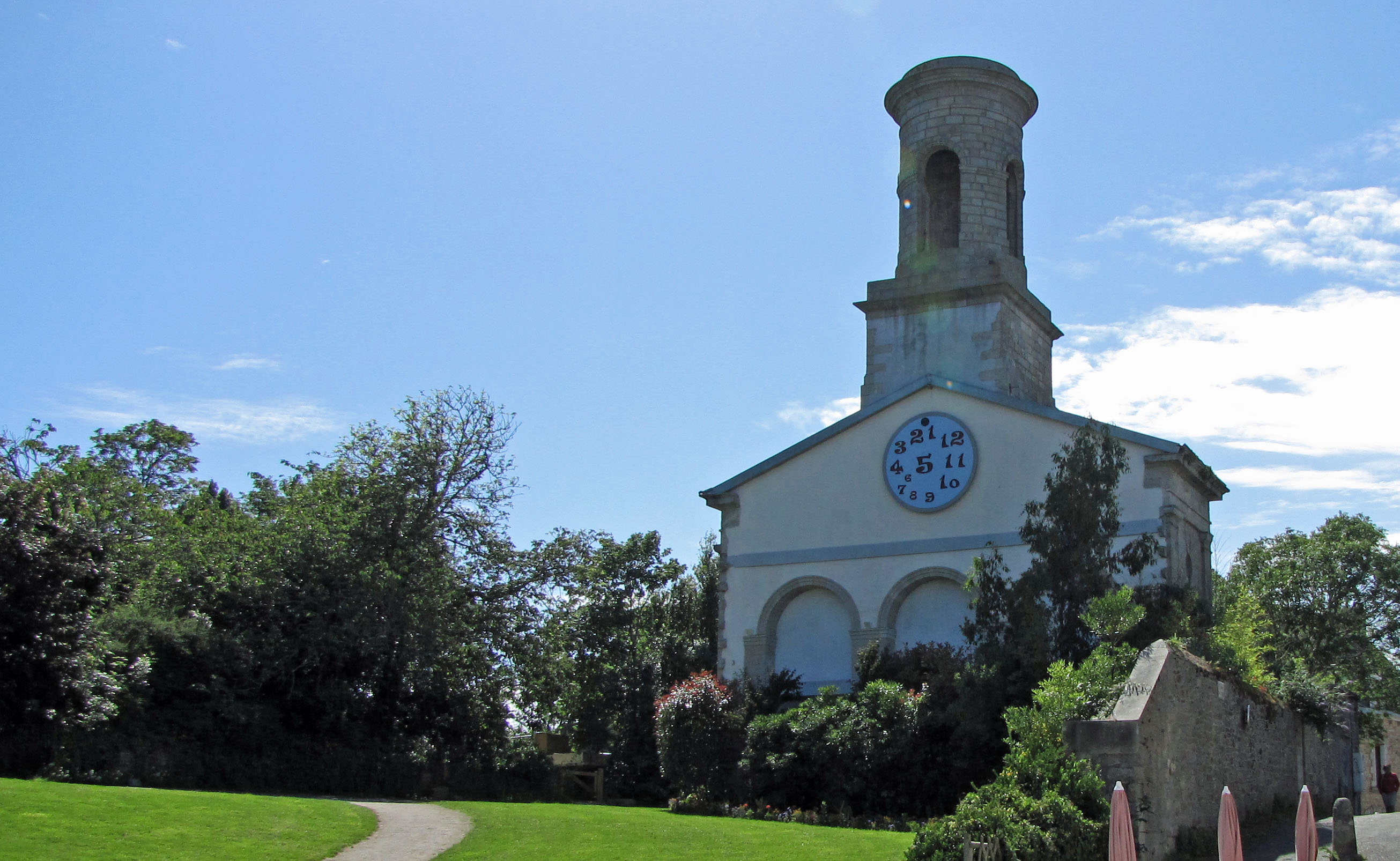
Saint-Guénolé's Church.

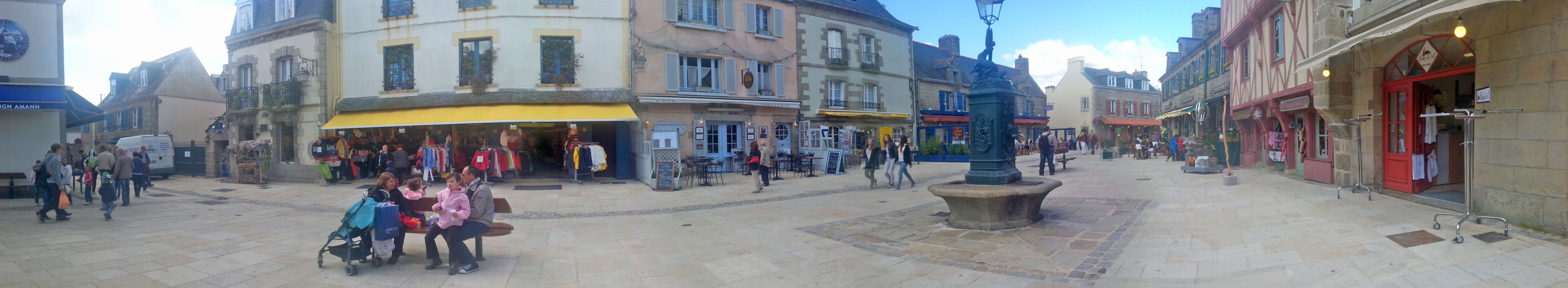
Inside the city.

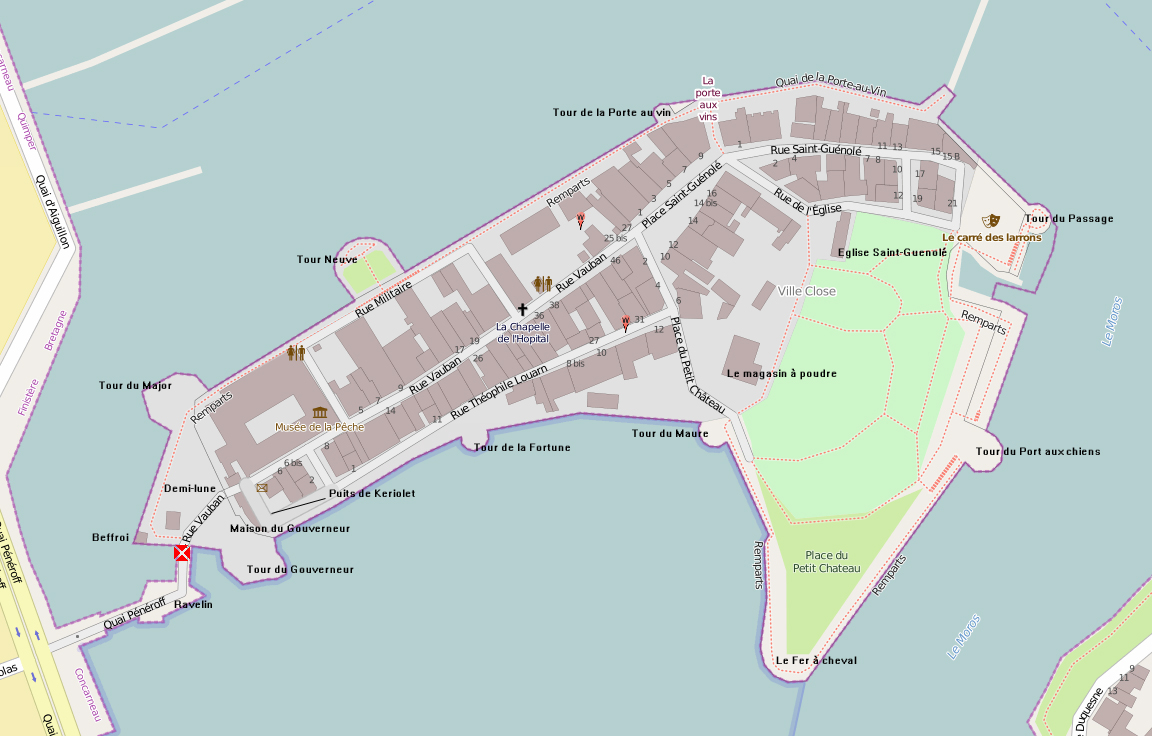
Map of the city.

== Bibliography ==
- Jean Moreau (1836). Schwartz & Gagnot (ed.). Histoire de ce qui s'est passé en Bretagne durant les guerres de la Ligue et particulièrement dans le diocèse de Cornouaille (in French). p. 356.
- Christophe-Paulin de La Poix Fréminville (1832). Lefournier et Deperiers (ed.). Antiquités de la Bretagne: Finistère (in French). Vol. 1. p. 326. 25.
- Collectif (1998). Flohic (ed.). Le patrimoine des communes du Finistère (in French). p. 1565. ISBN 2-84234-039-6. Flohic.
- Roger Frey (2013). "Étymologie et histoire de Concarneau" (in French). infobretagne.com.
- Louis-Pierre Le Maître (2003). Palantines (ed.). Concarneau, histoire d'une ville (in French). p. 221. ISBN 978-2911434259.
- Paul Nédellec (22 November 1936). "Concarneau, ville de joie". La Croix (in French). No. 16495.
- J. Trévédy (1990) [1908], Res Universis/Le livre d'histoire-Lorisse (ed.), Essai sur l'histoire de Concarneau, Monographies des villes et villages de France (in French), p. 204, ISBN 2-87760-280-X, ISSN 0993-7129
