= Alfred Guillou =

French painter (1844–1926)

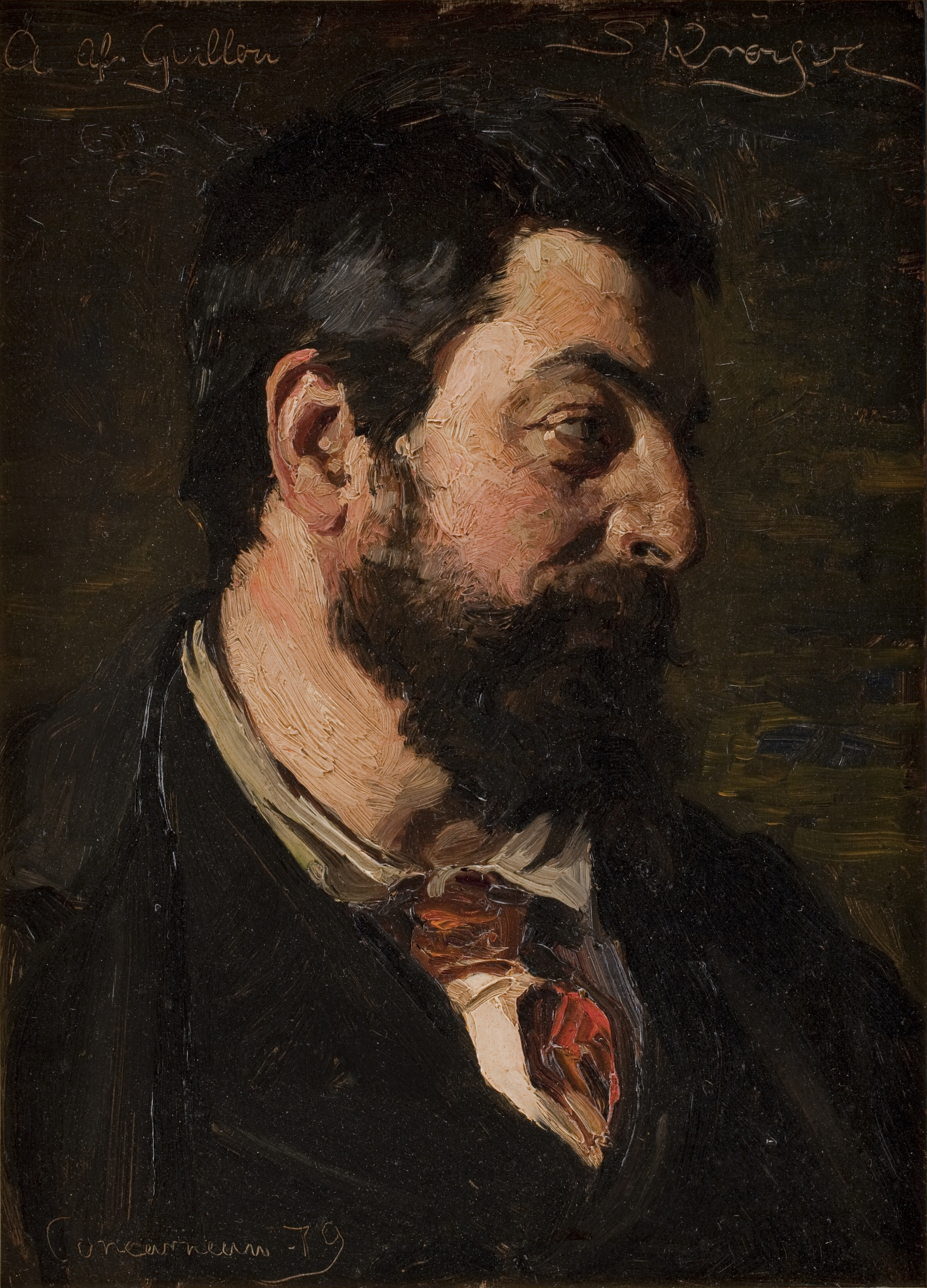
Alfred Guillou; portrait by Peder Severin Krøyer (1879)

Alfred Guillou (12 September 1844, Concarneau – 1926, Concarneau) was a French painter of Breton heritage.

== Biography ==
His father was a fisherman and farmer who served as mayor of Concarneau for fifteen years. He received his first art lessons from the lithographer Théodore Le Monnier (1815–1888), who was visiting Concarneau. On his advice, Guillou moved to Paris in 1862, where he attended the Académie Suisse for a short time, then found a position in the workshop of Alexandre Cabanel. While there, he met Jules Bastien-Lepage, Fernand Cormon and Théophile Deyrolle, who he convinced to give up architecture and join him at Cabanel's.

He debuted at the Paris Salon of 1868 with his Young Breton Fisherman. Three years later, he and his friend Deyrolle left Paris for Concarneau, with nothing more than they could carry on their backs. The following year, Deyrolle married Guillou's sister Suzanne (1846-1933), who was also a painter. Together, they created the Concarneau Art Colony, which benefitted from its proximity to Pont-Aven, where Paul Gauguin and his followers congregated. He also exhibited works at both the 1889 and 1900 Universal Exhibitions in Paris where he received silver medals.

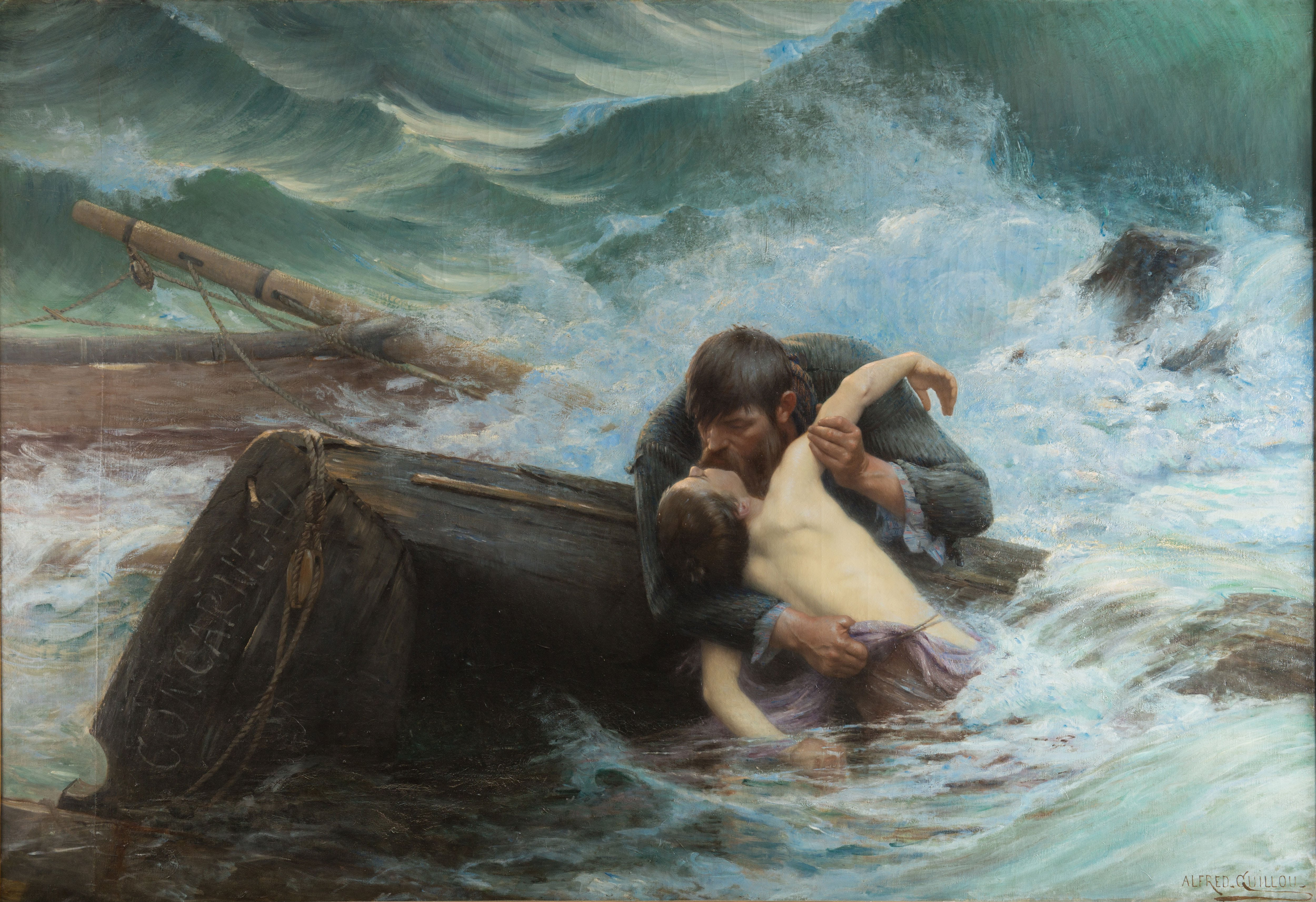
Goodbye! (1892; Musée des beaux-arts de Quimper).

After his marriage to the daughter of the engraver Joseph Gabriel Tourny (1817–1880), he maintained a home in Montparnasse, but spent as much time as possible in his hometown. Following his father's death in 1887, he built a home and workshop there, became involved in local politics and joined the board of the Musée des beaux-arts de Quimper.

Over the years, the Colony attracted many artists who were either interested in maritime subjects or wanted to achieve a sort of primitivism; represented for them by the traditions of the Breton people, which had survived mostly intact from an earlier period. Among the better-known artists who spent time there were Peder Severin Krøyer, Charles Cottet, Jules Bastien-Lepage, Pascal Dagnan-Bouveret, Amélie Lundahl, Cecilia Beaux and T. Alexander Harrison.

== Some of Guillou's works ==
- "Le dernier marin du "Vengeur"". This Guillou painting was purchased by the French state from the Paris Salon of 1881.
- "Arrivée du pardon de Sainte-Anne de Fouesnant, Concarneau". This Guillou painting was purchased by the French state from the Paris Salon of 1887. A photograph of the painting can be seen in the gallery below.
- "Bretonne portant du goémon" or "Ramasseuse de goémon". This painting dates to 1890 and is held by the Musée de Jacobins in Morlaix. A preliminary sketch can be seen in the Paris Musée du Louvre département des Arts graphiques.
- " Arrivée des Pecheurs de Sardines". Painting can be seen in Saint-Brieuc's Musée d'art et d'histoire des Côtes-d'Armor.
- "Debarquement du Thon à Concarneau". This painting can be seen in theSaint-Brieuc Musée d'art et d'histoire des Côtes-d'Armor.
- "Au devant de son Père". This painting was exhibited at the Paris Salon of 1897.
- "La première Visite aux Grands-Parents". This painting was exhibited at the Paris Salon of 1910.
- "Jeune marin tenant dans ses bras un énorme poisson". This pencil sketch is held by the Paris Musée du Louvre département des Arts graphique.

== Selected paintings ==
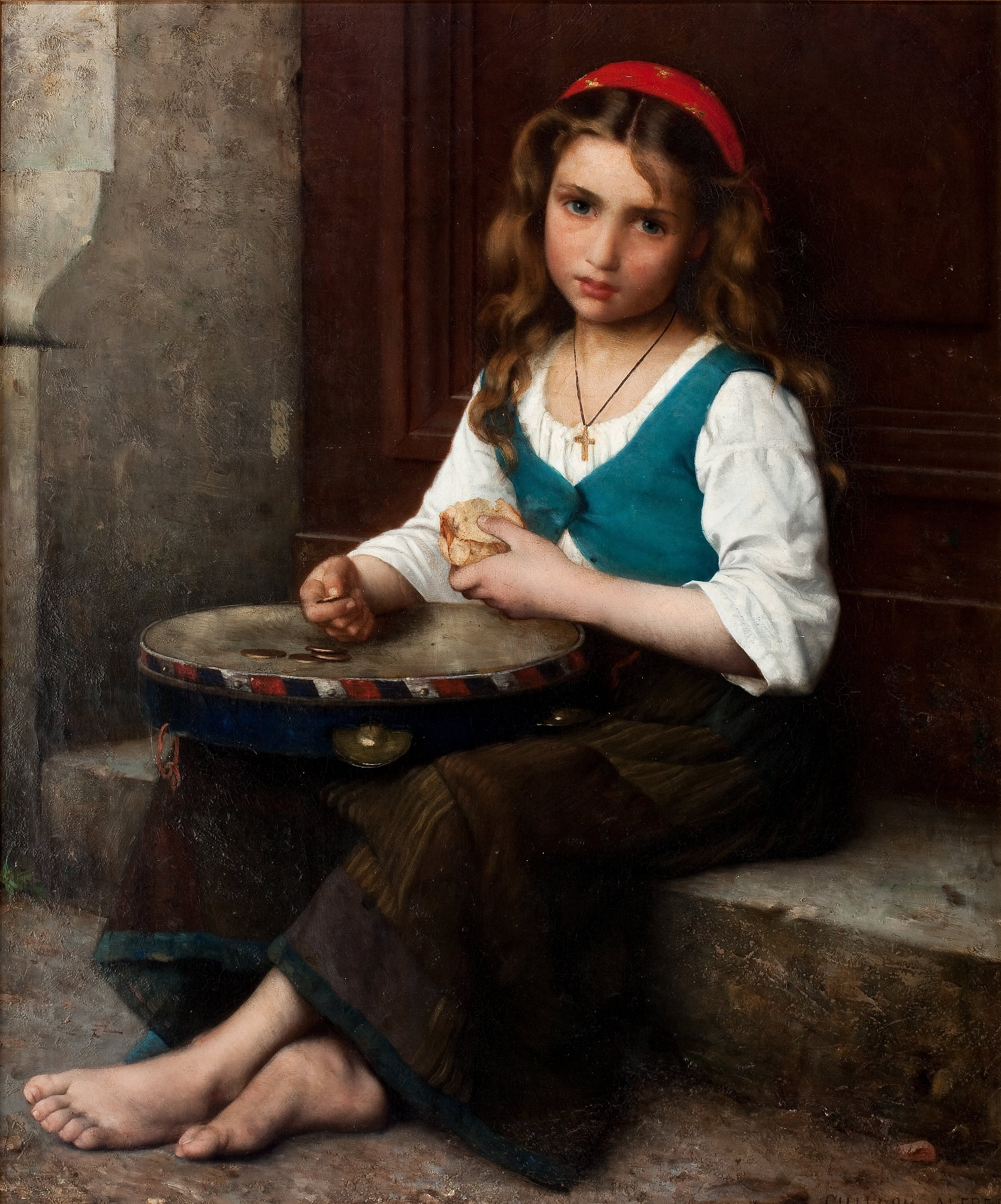
Street Musician

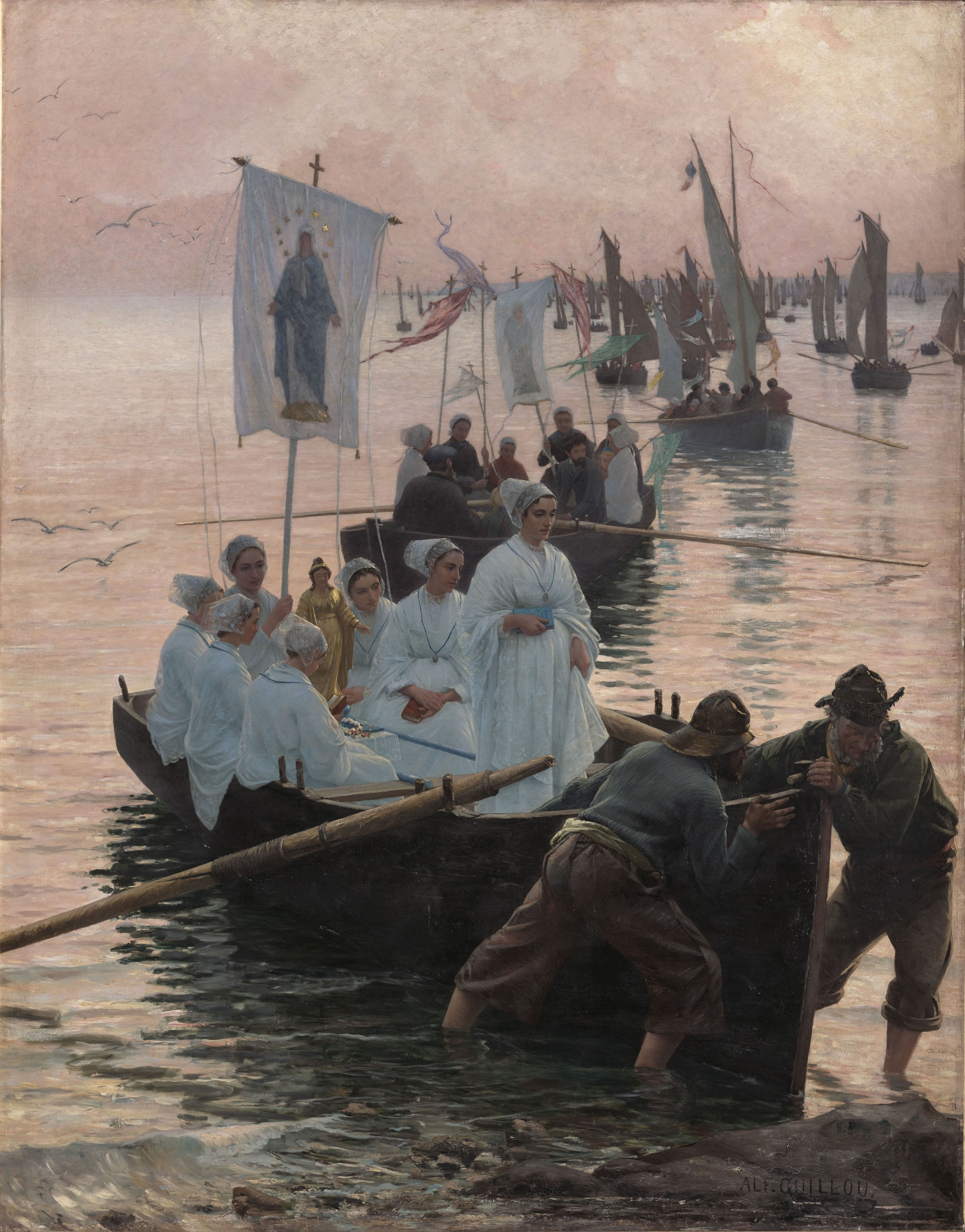
Arrival of the Pardon of Sainte Anne at Concarneau (Quimper Musée des Beaux-arts)

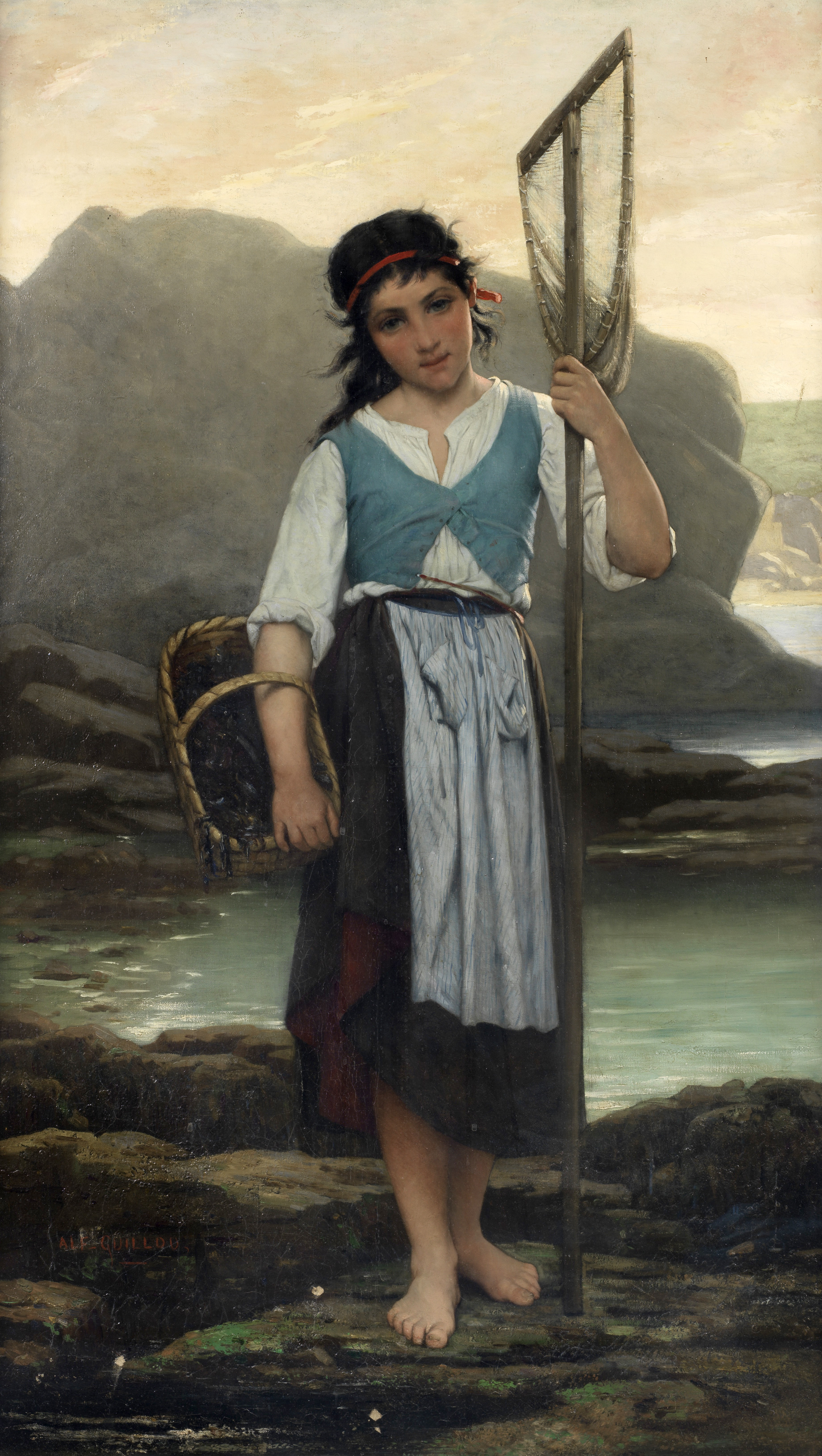
The Mussel Gatherer

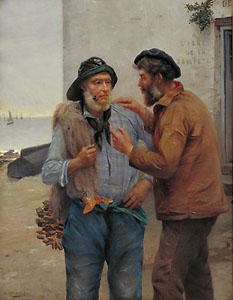
Sheltered from the Storm (Quimper Musée des Beaux-arts)

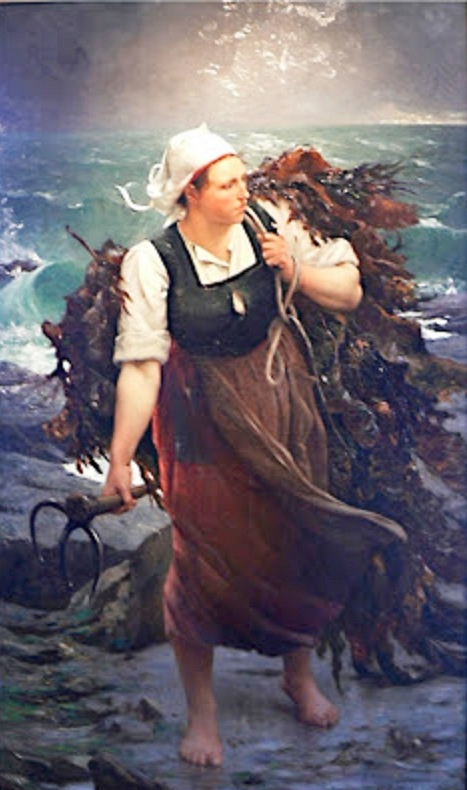
The Kelp Picker
