= Axel Arigato =

Swedish fashion house

- Company type: Private
- Industry: Fashion
- Founded: 2014
- Founders: Max Svärdh; Albin Johansson
- Headquarters: Gothenburg, Sweden
- Key people: Albin Johansson (CEO); Max Svärdh (creative director)
- Products: Ready-to-wear; shoes; accessories
- Website: axelarigato.com

Axel Arigato is a luxury Swedish fashion house based in Gothenburg, Sweden, in 2014 by fashion designers Max Svärdh and Albin Johansson. The company specializes in men's and women's footwear and ready-to-wear fashion inspired by Scandinavian minimalism and streetwear.
