= Fernand-Marie-Eugène Le Gout-Gérard =

French painter (1854–1924)

Fernand Le Gout-Gérard
- Fernand Le Gout-Gérard
- Born: 29 October 1854; Saint-Lô
- Died: 11 August 1924; 17th arrondissement of Paris
- Occupations: Painter, printmaker, graphic artist
- Spouse: Renée Charbonnier
- Children: Madeleine Legout-Gérard
- Awards: Officer of the Legion of Honor

Fernand-Marie-Eugène Le Gout-Gérard, sometimes written Legout-Gérard, was born in Saint-Lô on 29 October 1854 and died in Paris on 11 August 1924. He was a French painter mainly of seascapes.

== Biography ==
Taught at the Saint-Lô college in Normandy, he became a tax collector in 1878. At the age of 32 abandoned his career and took up painting. Around 1889, he discovered Concarneau. He became a member of the "Société nationale des Beaux-Arts'" and the London '"Pastel Society".

He became known as a marine painter particularly of the ports and markets of Brittany. He was painter, watercolourist and designer.

In 1903, he bought the villa Ker Moor in Concarneau, which became his house and also a meeting place of the artists known as the "Groupe de Concarneau". He painted market scenes, fairs, and the returning fishing vessels; scenes of everyday Breton life.

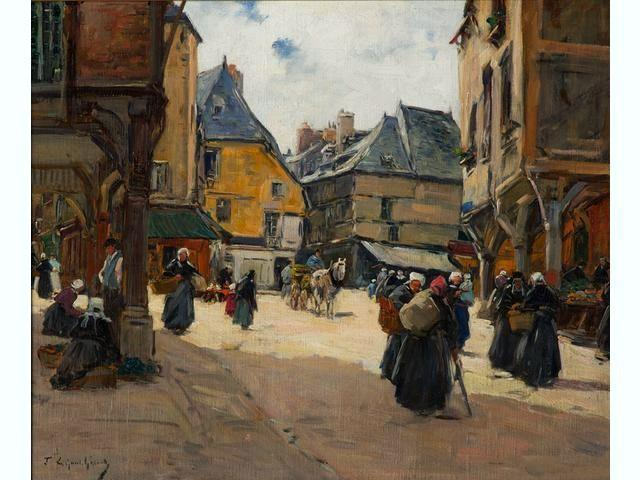
A Legout-Gérard study of Dinan

== Some of his paintings ==
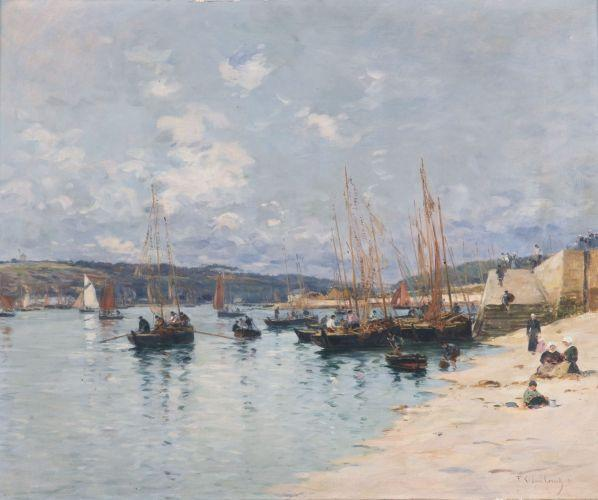
A view of Concarneau

In 1899, Legout-Gérard exhibited the painting "Derrière la ville close (Concarneau, temps gris)" to the Paris salon (La Société nationale des Beaux-Arts on the Champ-de-Mars). This painting was purchased by the state and in 1901 his painting "L'entrée du Vieux bassin" was also purchased by the state when shown at that year's salon.

Other paintings by Legout-Gérard include "Le marché à Concarneau", "Le quai Pénéroff", "Thoniers dans la baie du soir", "Etretat", "Thoniers, soleil couchant" and "Le marché à Quingamp". Le Gout-Gérard involved himself closely in the affairs of Concarneau. He was the president of the "Comité de la fête des Filets bleus" an organization which strove to improve the lot of the local fisherman and took an active interest in preserving Concarneau's ramparts. Apart from his Brittany paintings he painted in Normandy, Venice, Greece, and North Africa. An exhibition of his work was staged in 2010 at the Musée du Faouët.
