= The Pardon of Kergoat =

Painting by Jules Breton

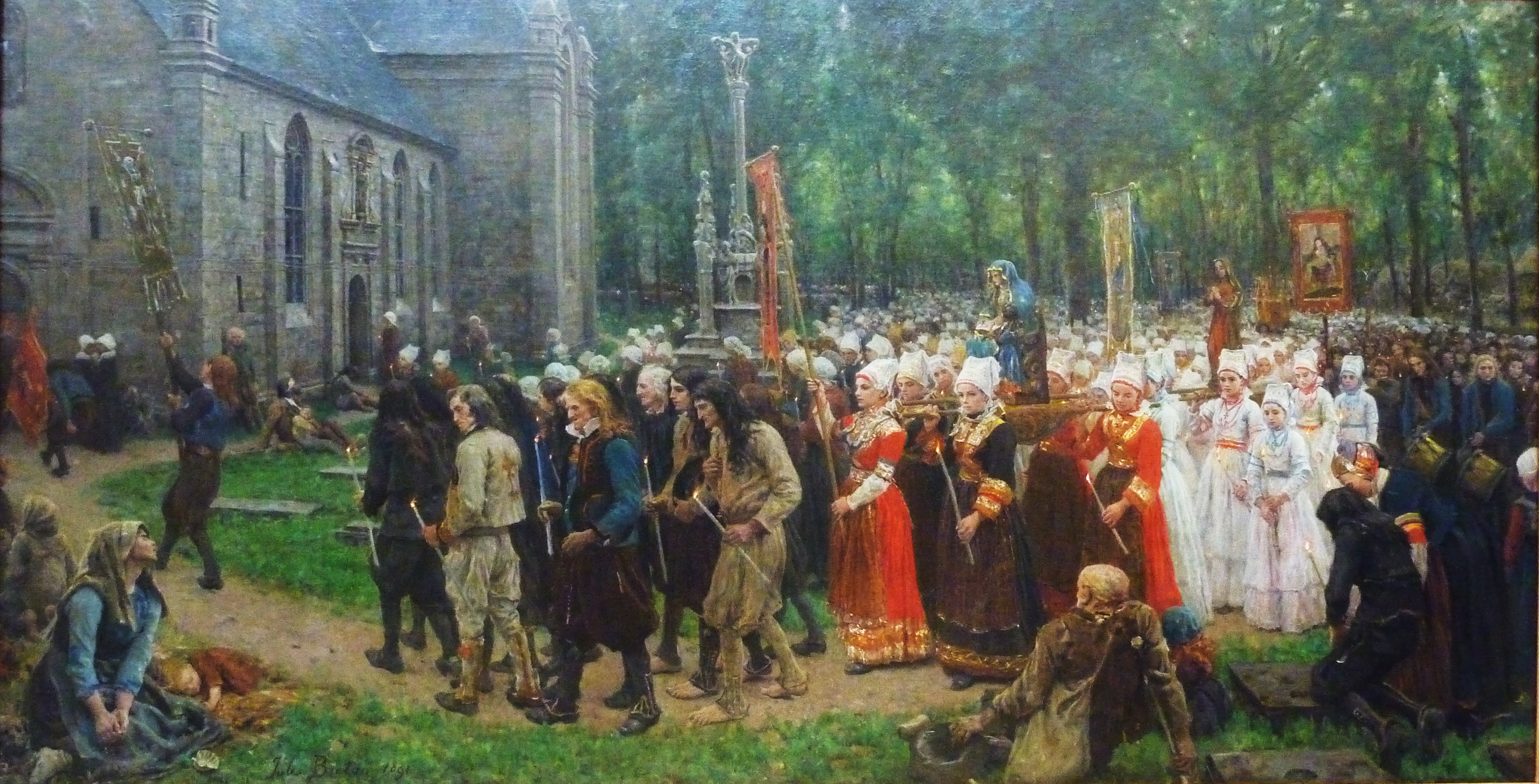
- Artist: Jules Breton
- Year: 1891
- Medium: Oil on canvas
- Dimensions: 123.6 cm × 234 cm (48.7 in × 92 in)
- Location: Musée des Beaux-Arts de Quimper, Quimper

The Pardon of Kergoat is an oil on canvas painting by French artist Jules Breton, from 1891. It depicts a pilgrimage scene specific to Brittany, in the commune of Kergoat in Finistère. It is held at the Musée des Beaux-Arts de Quimper.

== History and description ==
The scene shows a scene of a pardon, a penitential ceremony held in the French region of Brittany. It depicts an outdoor crowd moving towards a church. A forest lies in the background. In the foreground, men and women of poor condition, are dressed in rags, contrasting sharply with the sumptuous costumes of the people seen in the procession. The procession occupies five-sixths of the painting, leaving the final portion open. The religious building is located in the upper part of the painting, with its roof cut off. It is concentrated in the upper left corner, barely occupying half the vertical space of the canvas. A man carrying a banner walks towards the side entrance of the church.

Along the way, the infirm, the crippled, the destitute have come from afar, and they simultaneously implore charity for their misery and prayers for their suffering.

The scene depicted takes place in Kergoat, in Quéménéven, a small Breton commune near Locronan. The Notre-Dame de Kergoat chapel is shown in the background. The painting represents the "procession of miracles" which takes place after vespers on the Sunday following the Assumption. The artist made sketches and studies of heads and painted preliminary sketches of the procession when he attended it in 1890.

The pilgrims, each holding a candle, circle the chappel, accompanied by drummers. At the head of the procession is a lone banner bearer. The banner depicts Christ and represents the Confraternity of the Agony of Christ. The red dresses worn by the women in the procession are part of the traditional costume of Ploaré. The beggars begging for alms are positioned in the foreground on either side of the painting.

The subject of Brittany accounts for approximately one-third of Breton's pictorial output. The artist was primarily interested in the land, not the sea. This is reflected in his artistic production, which focuses on agricultural work or Pardons (religious festivals) rather than the coast.

Breton style in this painting is closer to Gustave Courbet's realism. André Cariou states that "The attention he pays to light, the freedom and sensitivity of his technique show in his later years a certain evolution which thus underlines the difference between the works of Jules Breton and the more academic ones of a Bougouereau or a Dagan-Bouveret."

== Provenance ==
The painting had several different owners. It was thought lost for a long time, but it was rediscovered at an exhibition in 1980. It was bought by the Musée des Beaux-Arts de Quimper, in 1994.
