= Irène Frain =

French novelist, journalist, and historian

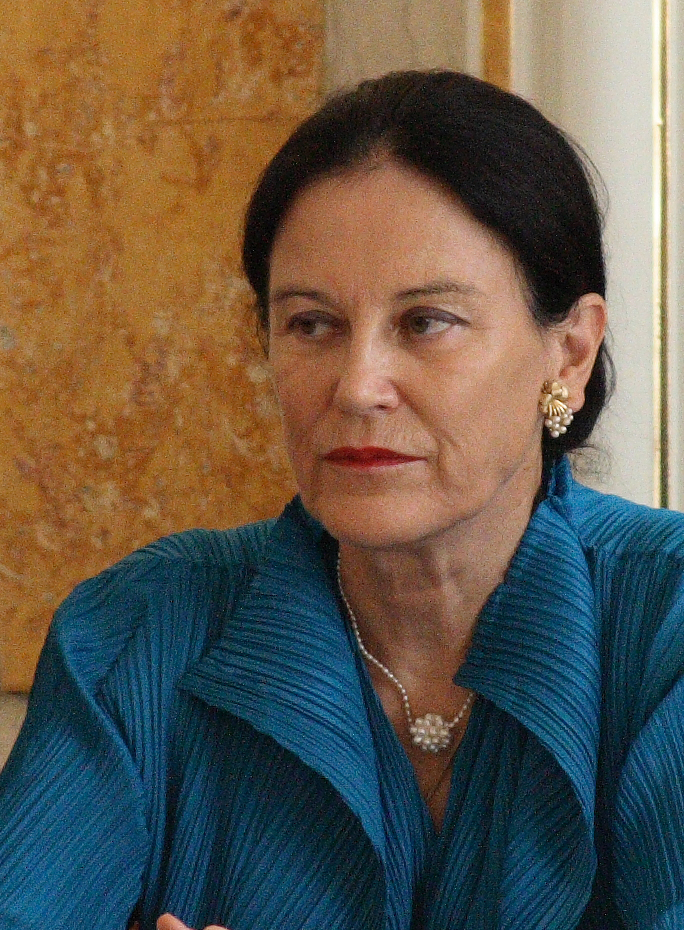
- Irène Frain in September 2009
- Born: Irène Le Pohon; 22 May 1950 (age 76); Lorient, Morbihan, France
- Occupations: Novelist, journalist and historian
- Writing career
- Language: French
- Genres: Novel, essay
- Notable works: Le Nabab (novel, 1982); Modern Style (novel, 1984); Secret de famille (novel, 1989); Devi (novel, 1992); L'homme fatal (novel, 1995); Les Naufragés de l'île Tromelin (novel, 2009); Sorti de rien (novel, 2013)

Irène Frain (née Le Pohon; born 22 May 1950 in Lorient, Morbihan) is a French novelist, journalist, and historian. She is a founding member of the Women's Forum for the Economy and Society.

== Biography ==
Irene Frain was born into a very close but destitute family. Her first book was a history of the golden age of maritime Brittany titled Quand les Bretons peuplaient les mers (When the Bretons inhabited the seas) published in 1979. She studied at the lycée Dupuy-de-Lôme de Lorient, where she obtained a degree in Classics in 1972. From 1972 to 1978 she taught classics at different high schools in Lagny-sur-Marne and Champigny-sur-Marne and finally Jacques Decour in Paris. From 1975 to 1981 she taught Latin and Latin literature at the Université de la Sorbonne Nouvelle in Paris.

She dedicated her first novel, The Nabob (1982), to René Madec. The novel's plot was about a small Breton cabin boy who became a mogul in India. This epic tale of 18th century India was a success, and her subsequent novels honed further her talents: an acute sense of intrigue, a sometimes dry and at other times flamboyant style, attempts at empathy with her characters, some humor, and an abundant imagination.

Some of her novels are Modern Style (1984), Désirs (Desire) (1986), Secret de famille (Secret Family) (1989), Histoire de Lou (History of Lou) (1990), Devi (1992), L’homme fatal (Fatal man) (1995), Les hommes, etc. (Men, etc.) (2003), Au Royaume des Femmes (The Kingdom of Women) (2007), and Les Naufragés de l’île Tromelin (The Castaways of Tromelin island) (2009).

Frain regularly participates in actions in favor of the Tibetan cause. She is an ambassador for the association Aide à l'enfance tibétaine (Aid to Tibetan Children) and La Voix de l'enfant (The Voice of the child). She is also a member of the honor committee of l'ADMD (Association for the Right to Die with Dignity).

== Themes ==
Two deep currents have been noted in Frain's work: a passion for issues concerning women's status and a marked predilection for the Orient—the two often overlapping. Her book, Beauvoir in love (2012), based on a survey in the United States by the University of Columbus, Ohio, shed light on Simone Beauvoir's misunderstood passion for the American writer Nelson Algren. She orchestrated courses on Beauvoir and illuminated some of Beauvoir's psychological features hitherto ignored, often retouching the biased and even negative portrait that Beauvoir made of her American lover after their separation. Frain also stressed the role of Algren in the genesis of The Second Sex.

A great traveler, Irene attributes her predilection for Asia to her birth in Lorient, a historic port of the East India Company, formerly spelled L'Orient. Several of her travel stories demonstrate this predilection: Quai des Indes (East India Dock) (1992) which recounts her investigation of the famous Indian bandit woman Phoolan Devi, La vallée des hommes perdus (The Valley of Lost Men) (1995) in collaboration with cartoonist André Juillard, Pour que refleurisse le monde (To flourish the world) (2002) with Jetsun Pema, the sister of the 14th Dalai Lama, and Au Royaume des femmes (The Kingdom of Women) (2006) and À la recherche du Royaume (In search of the Kingdom) (2007) with photos by François Frain which she wrote after travelling to China and Tibet in the footsteps of the famous American explorer Joseph Rock.

Her investigative passion is also evident in novels such as La Guirlande de Julie (The Garland of Julie) (1991) about the birth of the language of flowers and amorous civility in France, L'Inimitable (The Inimitable) (1998) a historical biography of Cleopatra, Gandhi, la liberté en marche (Gandhi, freedom at work) (2007), and La Forêt des 29 (The Forest of 29) (2011), chronicling the journey of Guru Jamboji, the founder of the Bishnoïs community. Irene admired Julien Gracq and devoted a short essay to him in 2001 titled Julien Gracq et la Bretagne (Gracq and Brittany).

Her enthusiasm for the art of living is also noted in, for example, Le bonheur de faire l'amour dans sa cuisine et vice-versa (The joy of making love in the kitchen and vice versa) (2004). She is also known for a strong taste for tales, as in Contes du Cheval bleu les jours de grand vent (Tales of the Blue Horse on windy days) (1980), republished and edited under the title Le Navire de l'homme triste et autres contes marins (The Ship of sad men and other marine tales) (2010), La Fée Chocolat (1995), and Le Roi des Chats (The King of Cats) (1996).

Frain recounted part of her childhood in Brittany in La côte d'amour (The coast of love) (2001), with photos by Christian Renaut, and also in La maison de la source (Home of the source) (2000). In La Forêt des 29 (2011), she investigated the journey of Jamboji, the founder of the fifteenth century Bishnoï community in India, staging it as a docudrama. She also reconstructed the immolation massacre that took place in 1730 at Khejarli near Jodhpur when 363 men, women and children gave their lives to protect the trees in a forest belonging to the Bishnoï peasant Amrita Devi.

== Bibliography ==
- 1979 : Quand les Bretons peuplaient les mers (under the name Irène Frain le Pohon)
- 1980 : Les Contes du cheval bleu les jours de grand vent (under the name Irène Frain le Pohon)
- 1982 : Le Nabab (about the life of René Madec)
- 1984 : Modern Style
- 1986 : Désirs
- 1989 : Secret de famille
- 1990 : Histoire de Lou
- 1991 : La Guirlande de Julie
- 1992 : Devi
- 1992 : Quai des Indes
- 1993 : Vive la Mariée
- 1994 : La Vallée des hommes perdus, illustrated by André Juillard
- 1995 : L'Homme fatal
- 1995 : La Fée chocolat
- 1996 : Le Roi des chats
- 1997 : Le Fleuve bâtisseur
- 1998 : L'Inimitable Cléopâtre
- 1999 : À jamais
- 2000 : La Maison de la source
- 2000 : Julien Gracq et la Bretagne
- 2001 : La Côte d'amour
- 2002 : Pour que refleurisse le monde (a collaboration with Jetsun Pema) Ed Presse de la Renaissance, ISBN 978-2-85616-835-6
- 2003 : Les Hommes etc.
- 2004 : Le Bonheur de faire l'amour dans sa cuisine et vice-versa
- 2006 : Au royaume des femmes
- 2007 : À la recherche du royaume
- 2007 : Gandhi, la liberté en marche
- 2009 : Les Naufragés de l'île Tromelin. Grand prix de l'Académie de marine 2010 – Grand Prix Palatine du roman historique 2009 – Prix Relay 2009
- 2010 : Le Navire de l'homme triste et autres contes marins
- 2011 : La Forêt des 29
- 2012 : Beauvoir in love
- 2013 : Sorti de rien. Prix Bretagne-Breizh 2014
- 2015 : Marie Curie prend un amant
