= Louise-Joséphine Sarazin de Belmont =

French painter

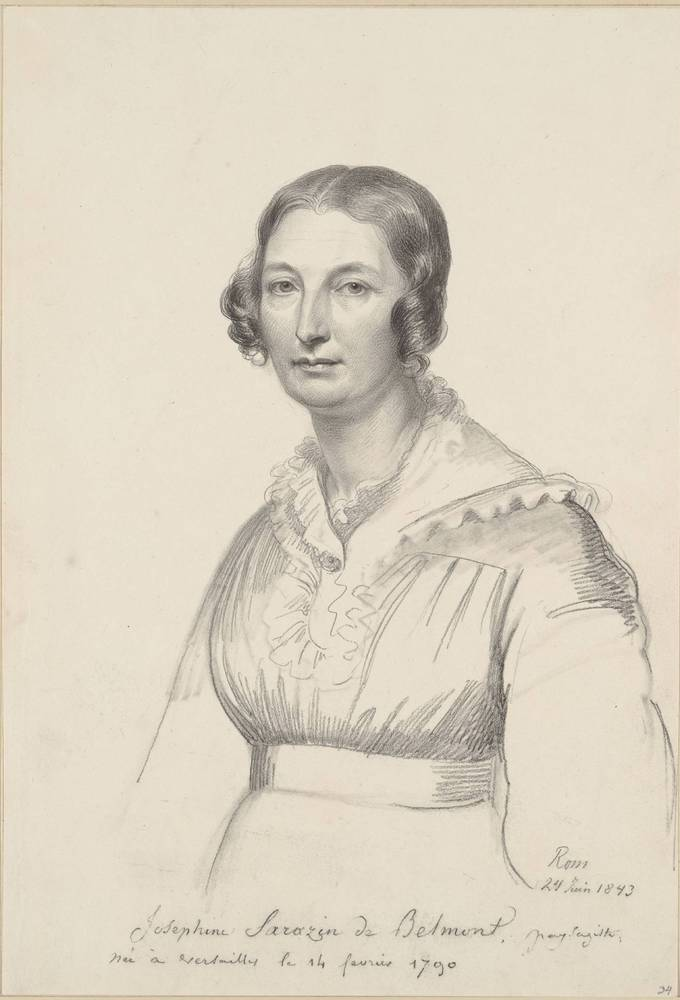
- Portrait of Louise-Joséphine Sarazin de Belmont, drawn by Carl Christian Vogel von Vogelstein, Rome, 24 June 1843 (Kupferstich-Kabinett, Dresden)
- Born: 1790; Versailles, France
- Died: 1871 (aged 80–81)
- Occupation: Painter

Louise-Joséphine Sarazin de Belmont (1790–1871) was a French landscape painter and lithographer.

== Life ==
Louise-Joséphine Sarazin de Belmont was born in Versailles in 1790. She studied painting under Pierre-Henri de Valenciennes (1750–1819), who supplemented his income as an artist by teaching drawing to young women. In 1812 de Valenciennes was appointed a professor at the École des Beaux-Arts, which did not admit women. During the time of the First French Empire she was encouraged by Joséphine de Beauharnais. After the restoration of the monarchy she became a protegee of the Duchess of Berry.

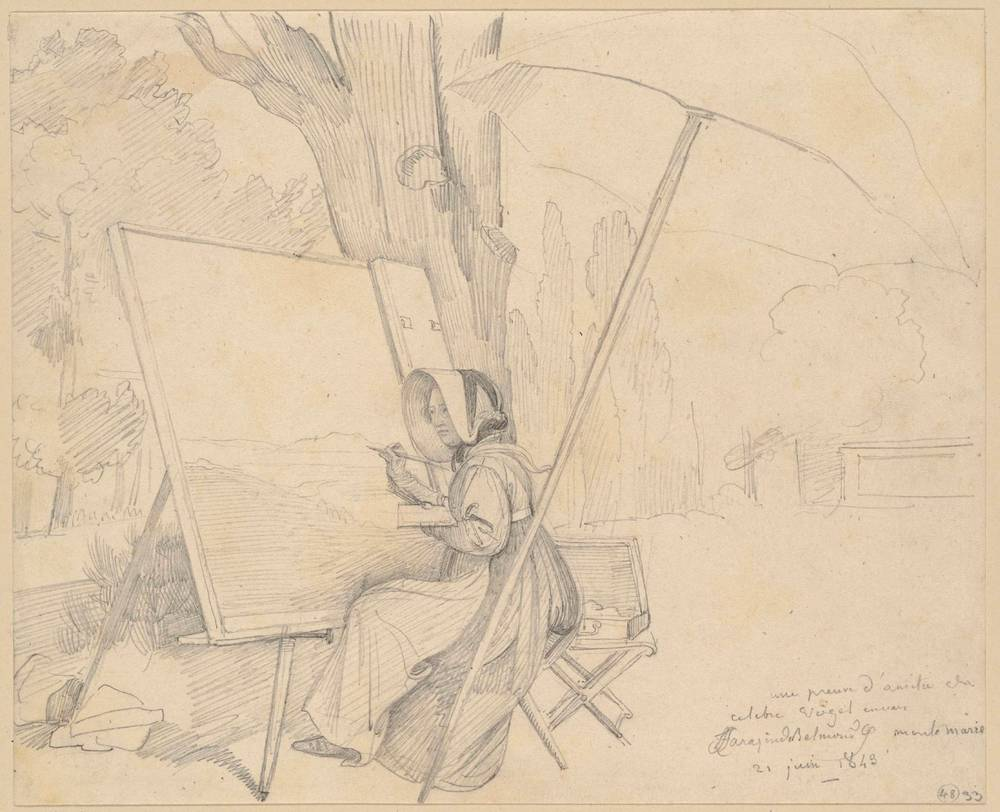
Self-portrait drawing of Louise Josephine Sarazin de Belmont, 21 June 1849

Sarazin de Belmont submitted her first paintings to the Salon at the Salon of 1812. Her Salon entries in the years that followed show that she travelled widely. Between 1824 and 1826 she painted in Rome, Naples and Sicily, and in 1831 was in the Pyrenees. She received the second class medal at the Salon of 1831 In 1834 she depicted the Forest of Fontainebleau. She won a first class medal in 1834. An 1834 dictionary of French artists listed her as a landscape artist living on the Rue Saint-Germain-des-Prés (Boulevard Saint-Germain) in Paris, where she taught pupils drawing and painting at her studio.

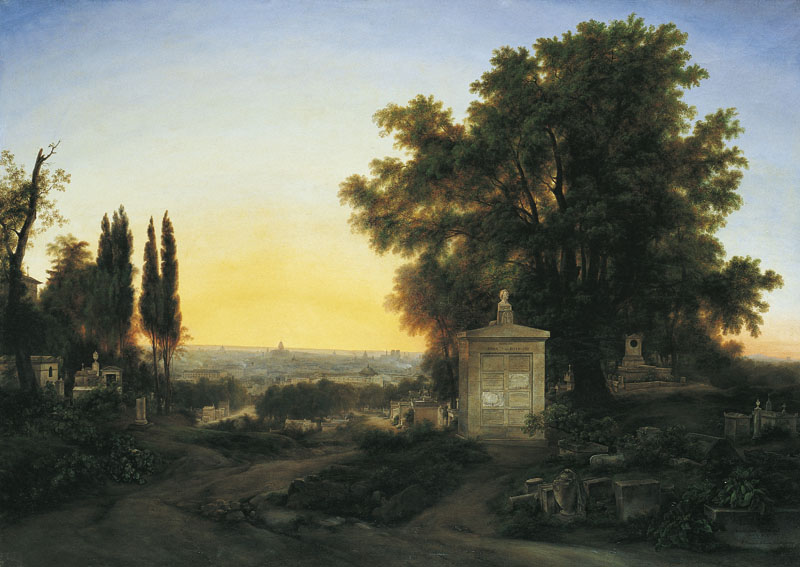
Paris, vu des hauteurs du Père Lachaise

Sarazin de Belmont painted in Nantes and Brittany from 1836 to 1837. She lived in Italy from 1841 to 1865, painting landscapes around Rome and views of Florence, Naples and Orvieto. She won another medal at the Salon in 1861. Her 1861 submission to the Salon was two paintings of the Roman Forum, one in the morning and the other in the evening. In 1865 she returned to Paris, and submitted her last entries to the Salon of 1868 hors concours. She died in 1871.

== Works ==
Many of Sarazin de Belmont's works depicted historical scenes, while others took pastoral themes.

- Vue de Saint-Pol-de-Léon, 1837, 62 cm × 90,5 cm, Musée des beaux-arts de Quimper.
- Paris, vu des hauteurs du Père Lachaise, Musée des Augustins de Toulouse
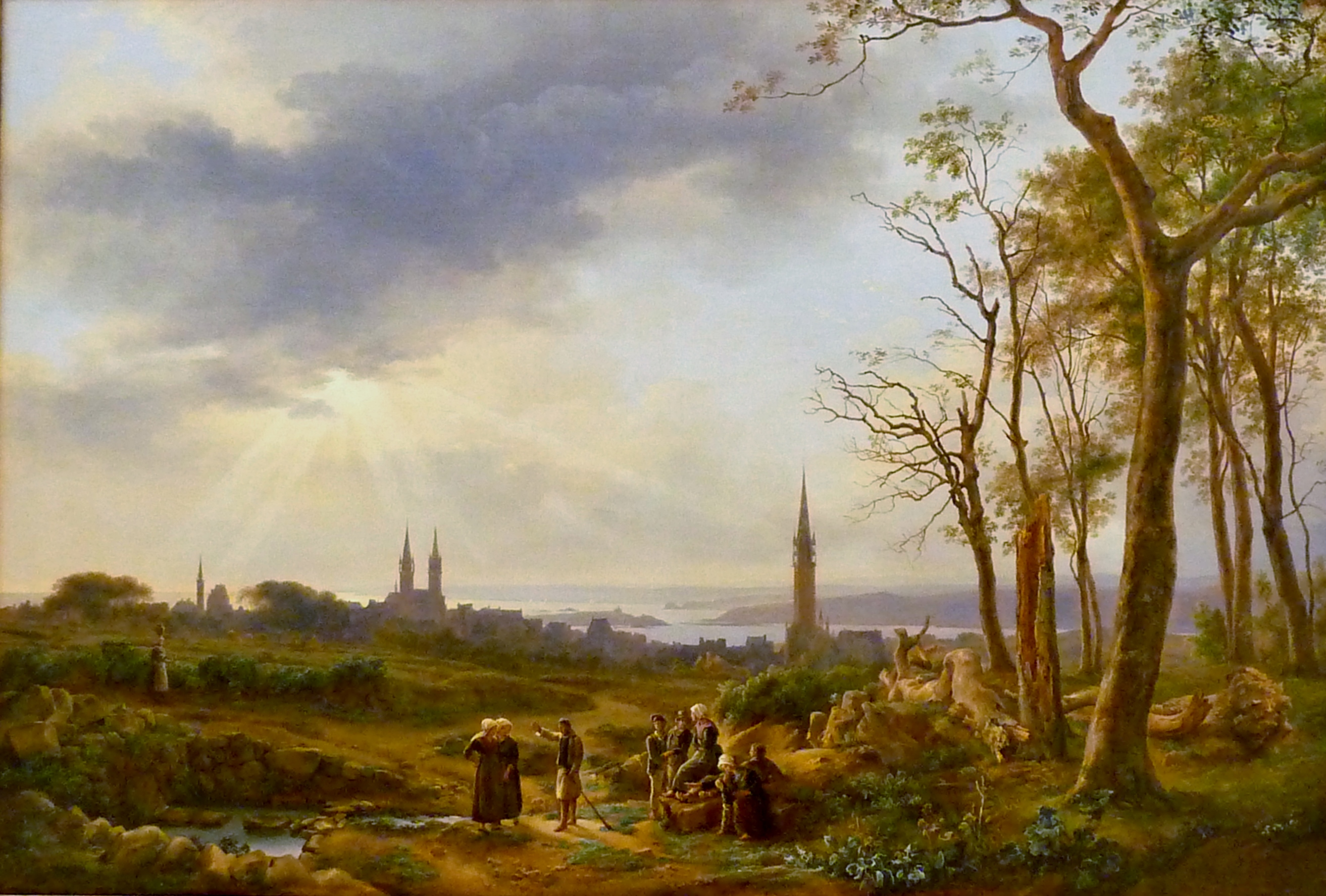
Vue de Saint-Pol-de-Léon (1837, musée des beaux-arts de Quimper)

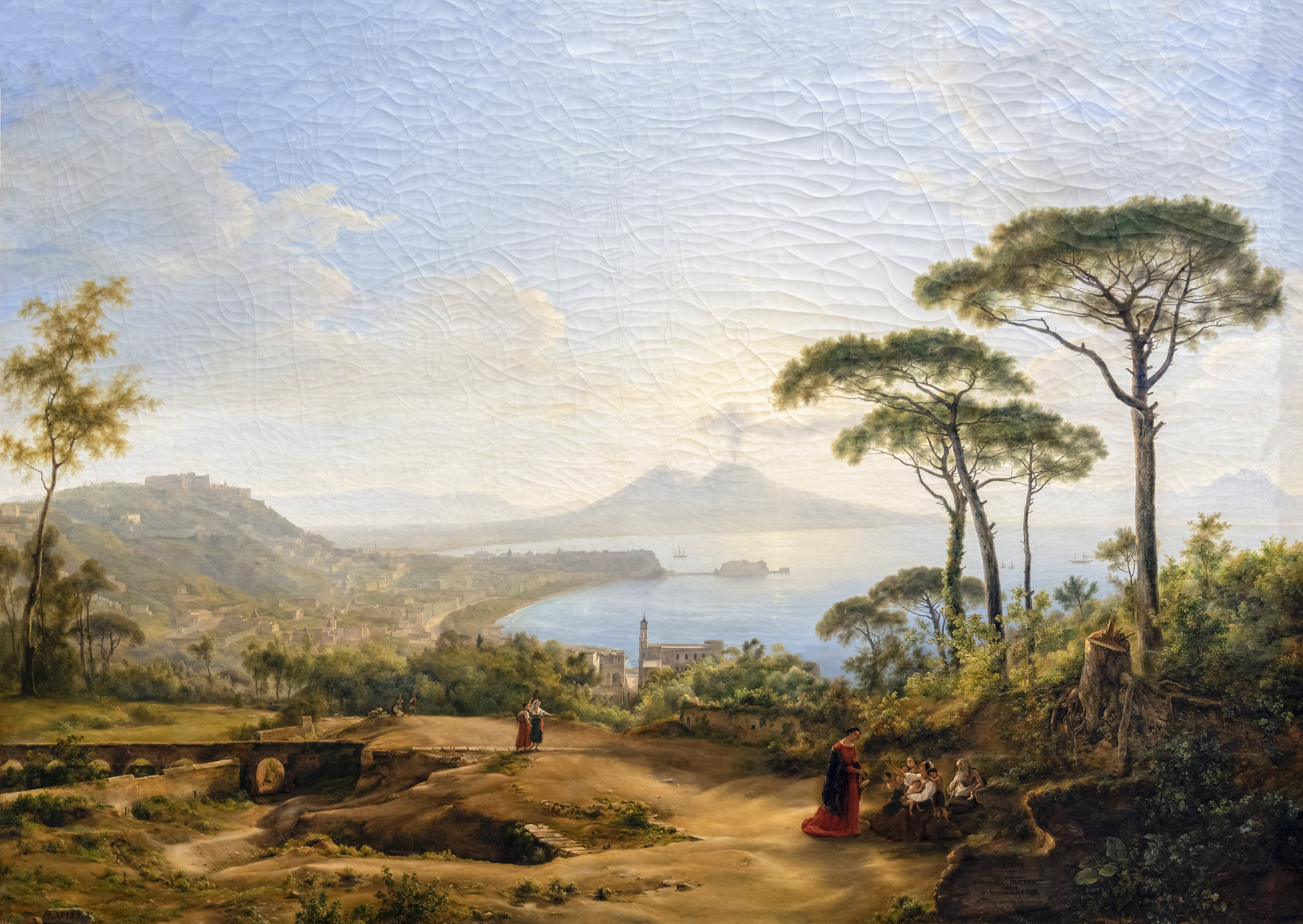
Naples, vue du Pausilippe (1842, musée des Augustins de Toulouse)

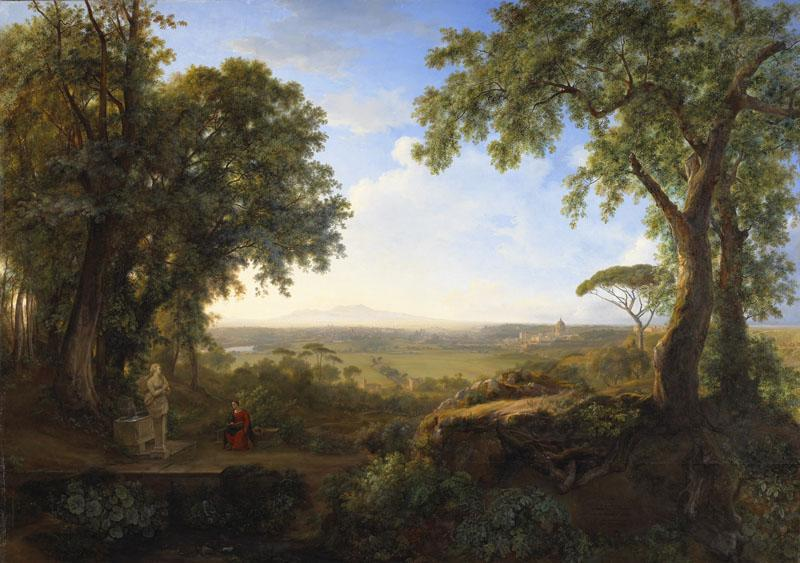
Rome, vue de Monte Mario (between 1842 and 1859, musée des Augustins de Toulouse)

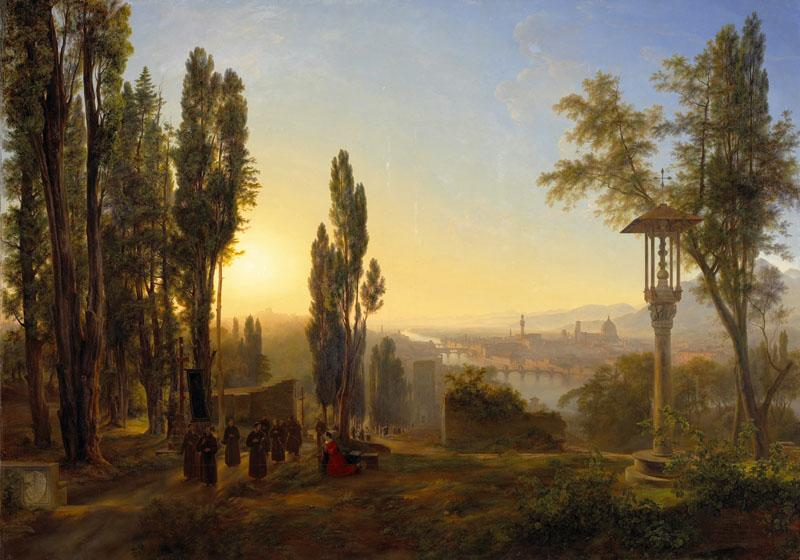
Florence, vue de San Miniato (between 1842 and 1859, Chambre de commerce de Toulouse)

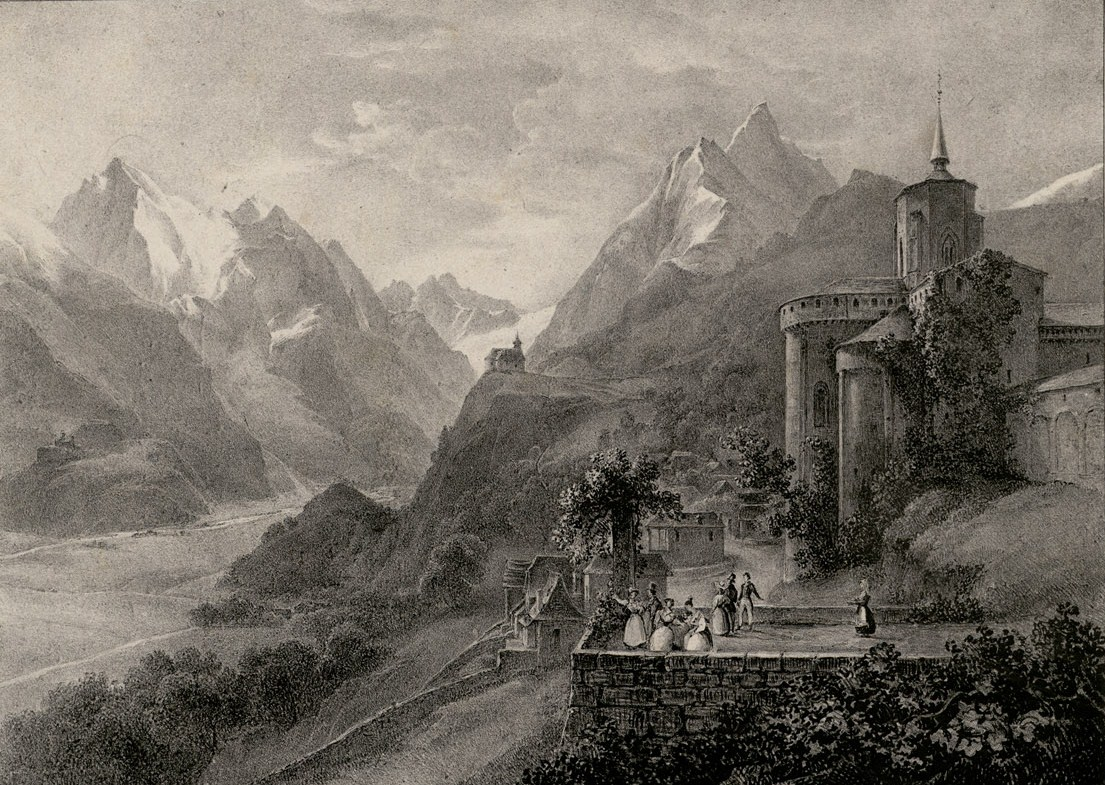
Saint-Savin (lithograph)

== Publications ==
- Joséphine Sarazin de Belmont (1859), Hommage à la mémoire de Mme Augustine Dufresne, née à Paris le 10 octobre 1789,... veuve d'Antoine-Jean Gros, le peintre de Jaffa. - Notice sur Mme Augustine Dufresne,... [Signé : Jine Sarazin de Belmont.]., impr. de J. Claye

== Sources ==
- Gabet, Charles (1834), Dictionnaire des artistes de l'école française, au XIXe siècle: peinture, sculpture, architecture, gravure, dessin, lithographie et composition musicale, Madame Vergne
- George (1864), Catalogue raisonné des tableaux du Musée de Toulouse, imprimerie I. Viguier
- Landon, Charles Paul (1831), Annales du musée et de l'école moderne des beaux-arts: Salon, Pillet Ainé
- Landon, Charles Paul (1834), Annales du musée et de l'école moderne des beaux-arts, ou Recueil des principaux tableaux, statues et bas-reliefs exposés au Louvre. Salon de 1834, ISBN 978-0-543-89984-2
- Marmottan, Paul (1886), L'École française de peinture (1789-1830), H. Laurens
- Plon, E. (1891), Inventaire général des richesses d'art de la France: Province: Monuments civils, France. Commission de l'inventaire général des richesses d'art de la France. Province: Monuments civils
- Rosenfeld, Daniel (1991), European Painting and Sculpture, Ca. 1770-1937, in the Museum of Art, Rhode Island School of Design, University of Pennsylvania Press, ISBN 0-911517-55-3
