= Laennec =

Laennec may refer to:

== People ==
- Guillaume François Laennec (1748–1822), French physician
- René Laennec (1781–1826), French physician and musician
- Laënnec Hurbon (born 1940), Haitian sociologist

== Places ==
- Laënnec, a quarter of the 8th arrondissement of Lyon, France
- Laënnec Glacier, a glacier in the Palmer Archipelago, Antarctica

== Other uses ==
- Doctor Laennec, a 1949 French historical drama film
