= Madec =

Madec is a surname, and may refer to:

- Abbot Jean-François Madec (1879–1936), pioneer of social action and ardent defender of the Breton culture
- Joseph Madec (1923–2013), French bishop of Toulon
- Philippe Madec (born 1954), French architect and urbanist
- René-Marie Madec (1736–1784), Breton sailor and adventurer
- Roger Madec (1950–2024), French politician
