= Madonna and Child (Sano di Pietro) =

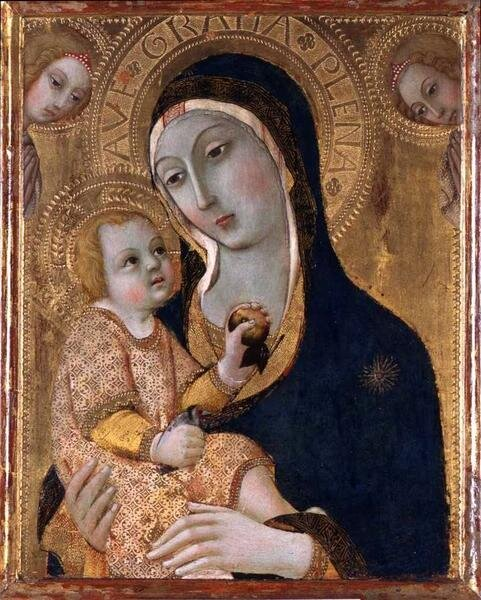

Madonna and Child is a 15th-century oil on panel painting by Sano di Pietro. Since 2001 it has been in the musée des Beaux-Arts de Quimper, in Quimper.

The Christ Child holds a fruit and a goldfinch, whilst on the Madonna's halo is the inscription AVE GRAZIA PLENA.

== External links (in French) ==
- "Vierge à l'Enfant". Musée des Beaux-Arts de Quimper..
- "Vierge à l'enfant, Sano di Pietro". Bretagne Musées..
