= Paris, Seen from the Heights of the Père Lachaise =

Painting by Louise-Joséphine Sarazin de Belmont

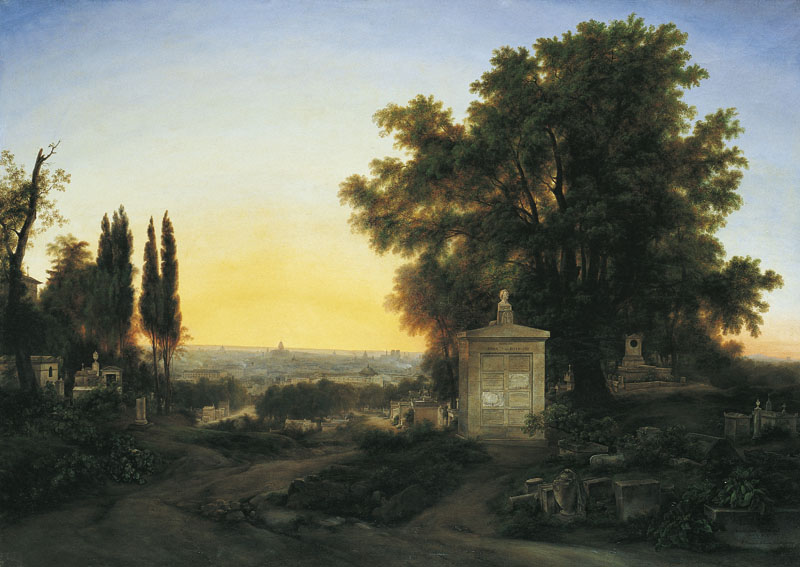
- Artist: Louise-Joséphine Sarazin de Belmont
- Year: 1842–1859
- Type: oil on canvas
- Dimensions: 140 cm × 198 cm (55 in × 78 in)
- Location: Musée des Augustins de Toulouse, Toulouse

Paris, Seen from the Heights of the Père Lachaise (French: Paris, vu des hauteurs du Père Lachaise) is a landscape painting made between 1842 and 1859 by Louise-Joséphine Sarazin de Belmont. The painting depicts Père Lachaise cemetery.

== History ==
The artist gave this painting to the Musée des Augustins de Toulouse in 1859, in memory of Augustine Dufresne (1789–1842), widow of Antoine-Jean Gros.

It was shown in the 1994 exhibition Toulouse à l'époque romantique.

== Description ==
The foreground shows the family tombs of Gros and Dufresne. The Italianate aspect of the landscape is similar to landscapes made by the artist in Italy:

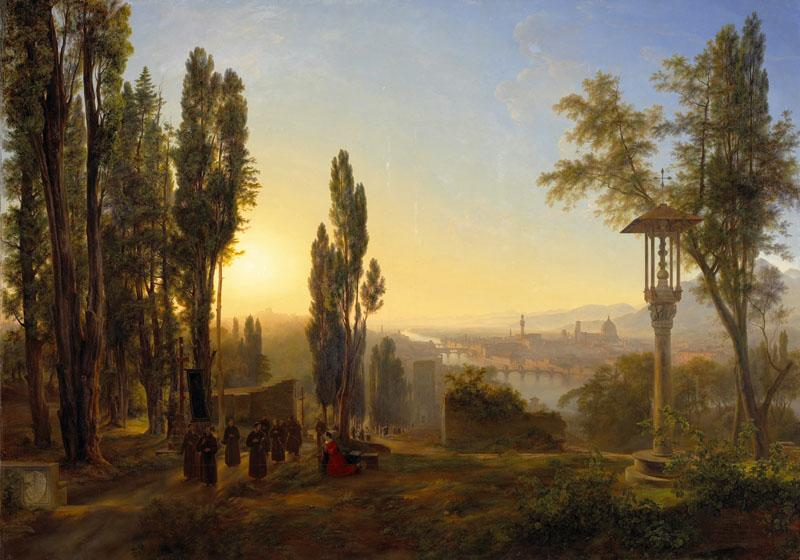
Vue de Florence

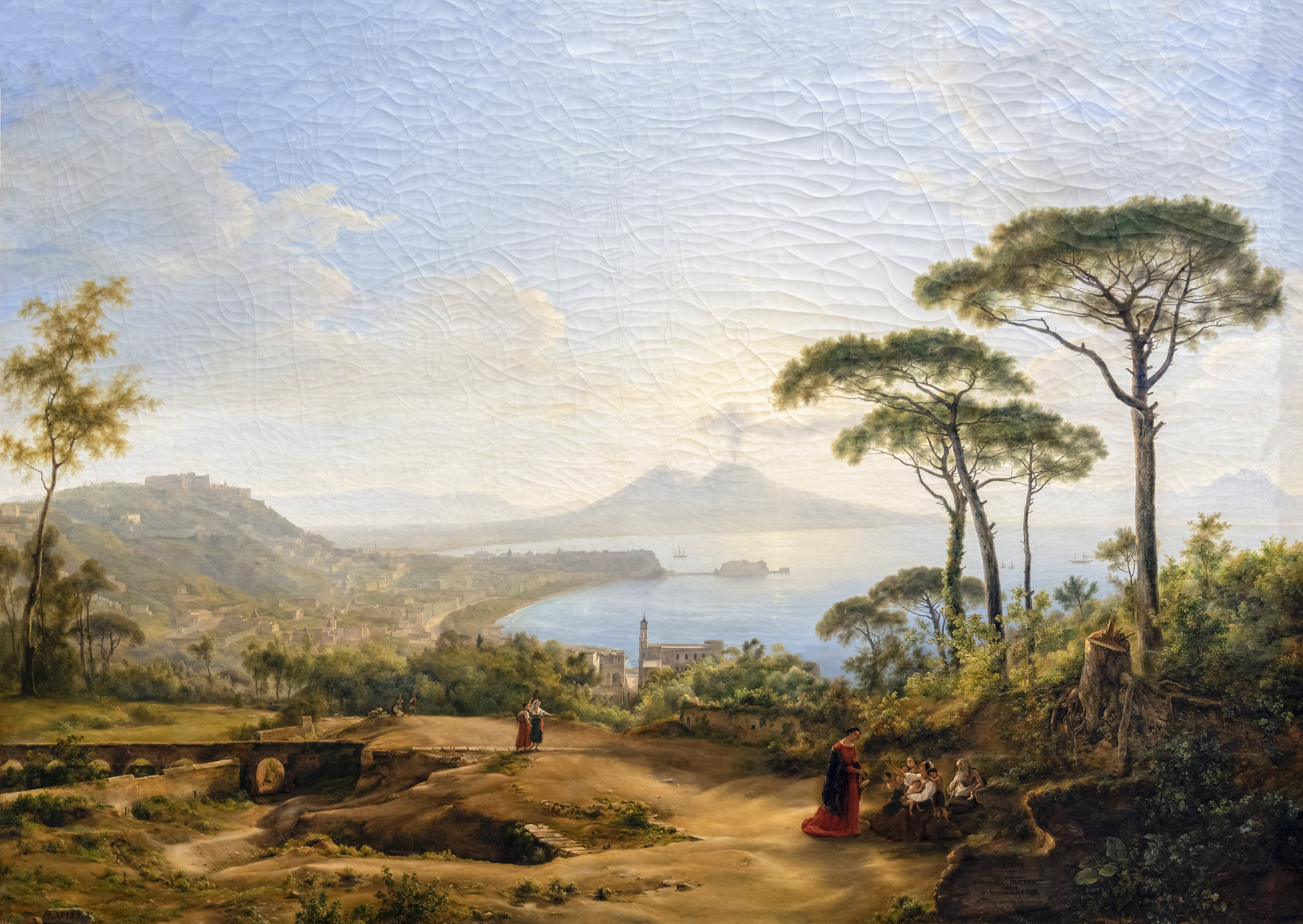
Vue de Naples

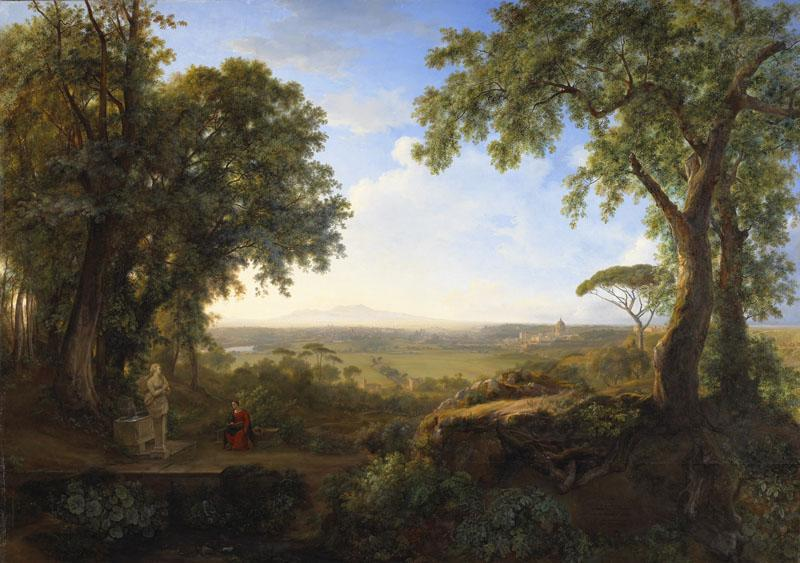
Vue de Rome

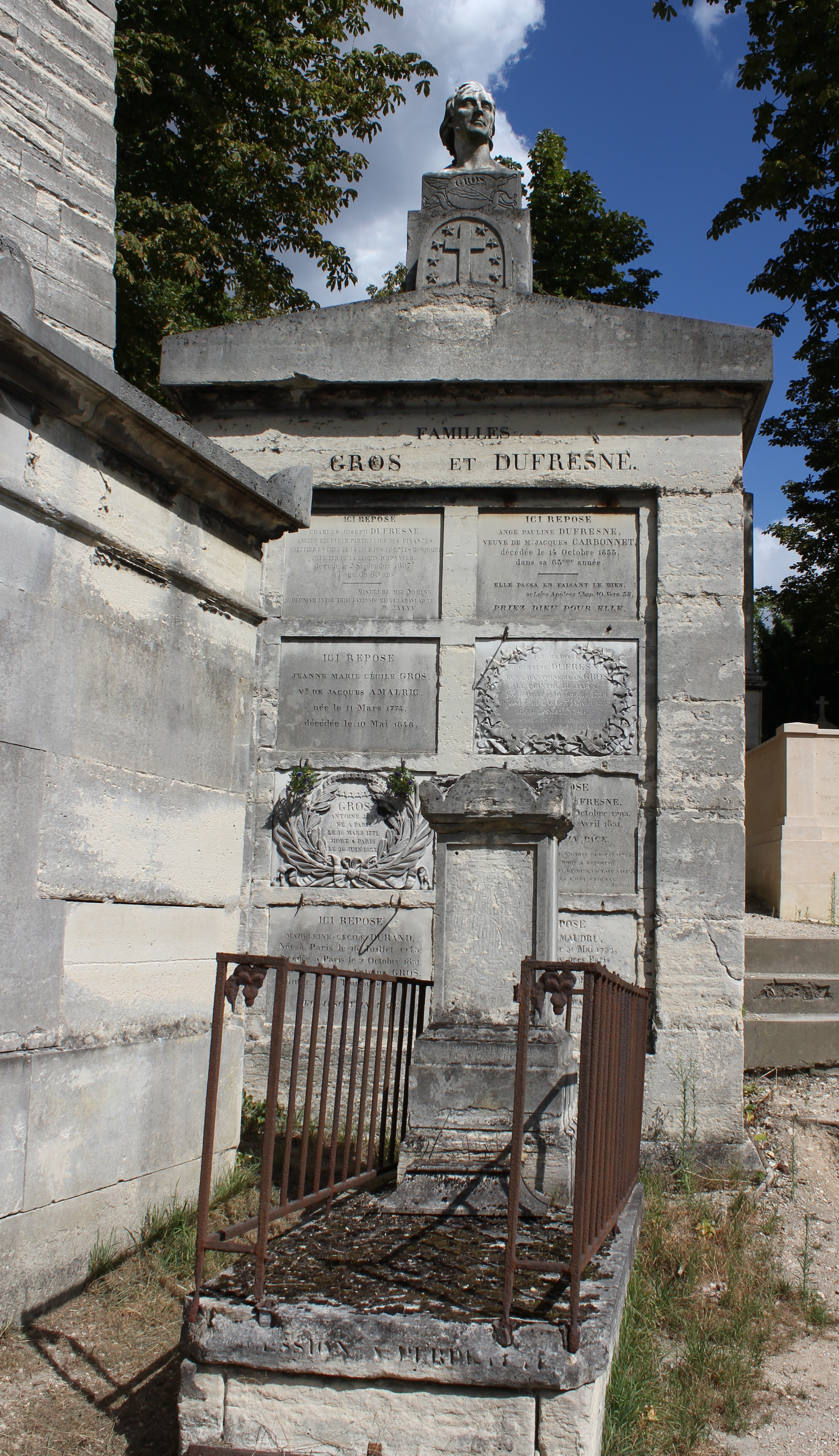
Tombe Gros et Dufresne
