= Quimper =

Quimper Kemper (Breton)
- Prefecture and commune
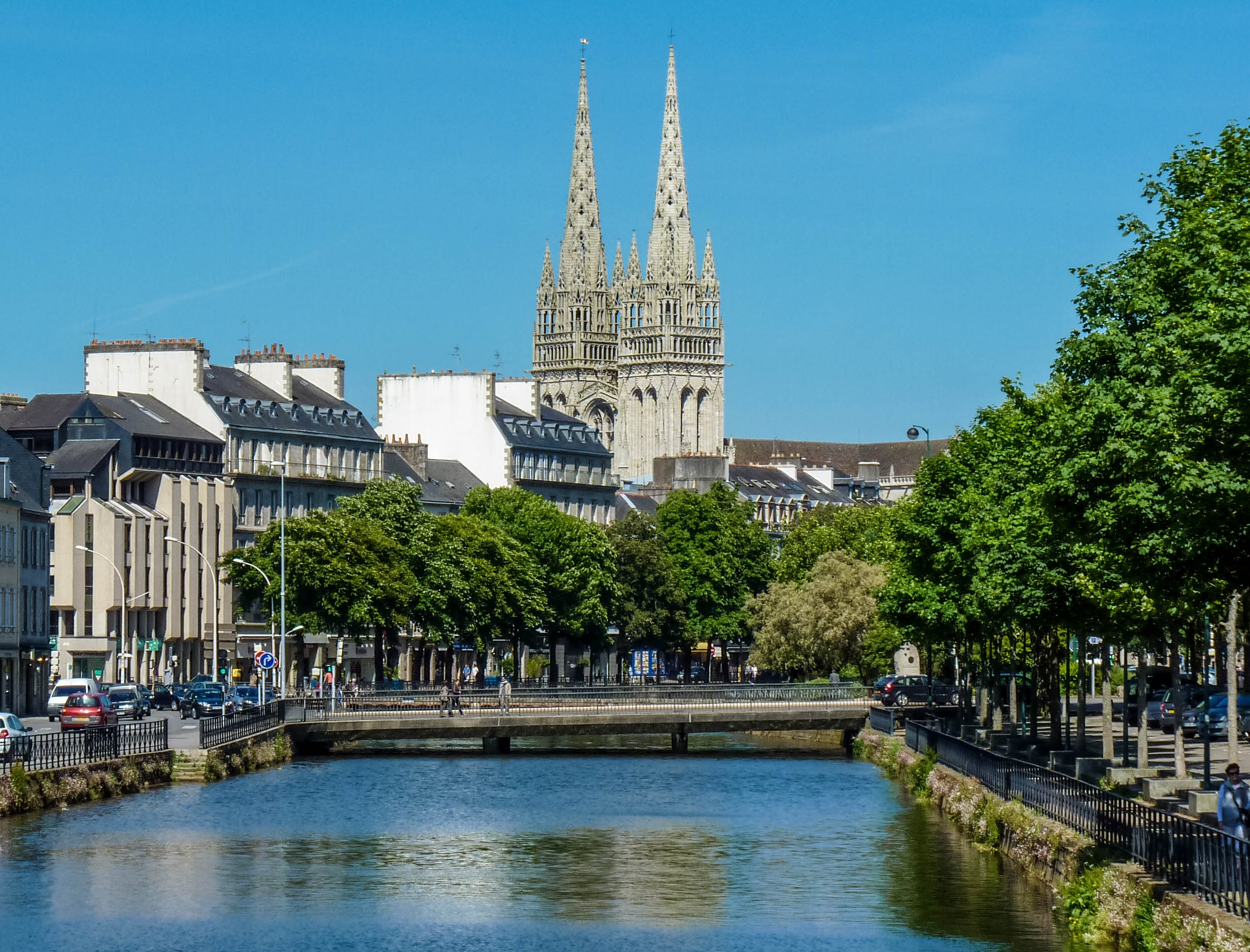
- The river Odet in the centre of Quimper

- Coat of arms
- Location of Quimper
- Location within France Location within Brittany
- Coordinates: 47°59′48″N 4°05′47″W
- Country: France
- Region: Brittany
- Department: Finistère
- Arrondissement: Quimper
- Canton: Quimper-1 and 2
- Intercommunality: Quimper Bretagne Occidentale

Government
  - Mayor (2020–2026): Isabelle Assih
- Area^{1}: 84.45 km^{2} (32.61 sq mi)
  - Urban (2020): 156 km^{2} (60 sq mi)
  - Metro (2020): 1,469 km^{2} (567 sq mi)
- Elevation: 6 m (20 ft)
- Highest elevation: 151 m (495 ft)
- Lowest elevation: −5 m (−16 ft)
- Population (2023): 64,385
  - Density: 762.4/km^{2} (1,975/sq mi)
  - Urban (2023): 77,214
  - Urban density: 495/km^{2} (1,280/sq mi)
  - Metro (2023): 242,213
  - Metro density: 164.9/km^{2} (427.0/sq mi)
- Time zone: UTC+01:00 (CET)
  - Summer (DST): UTC+02:00 (CEST)
- INSEE/Postal code: 29232 /29000
- ^{1} French Land Register data, which excludes lakes, ponds, glaciers > 1 km^{2} (0.386 sq mi or 247 acres) and river estuaries.

Quimper (French: [kɛ̃pɛʁ]; Breton: Kemper [ˈkempər]; Latin: Civitas Aquilonia or Corisopitum) is a commune and prefecture of the Finistère department of Brittany in northwestern France.

== Administration ==
Quimper is the prefecture (capital) of the Finistère department.

== Geography ==
The city of Quimper was built at the confluence of the Steir, Odet and Jet rivers. Routes Nationale 165, D785, D765 and D783 were designed to intersect here, 62 km (39 miles) northwest of Lorient, 181 km (112 mi) west of Rennes, and 486 km (302 mi) west-southwest of Paris.

=== Climate ===
Quimper has an oceanic climate (Köppen climate classification Cfb), with an average annual temperature of 12.1 °C (53.8 °F). The temperatures are highest, on average, in July and August, at around 17.7 °C (63.9 °F), and lowest in January, at around 7.1 °C (44.8 °F). The highest temperature ever recorded in Quimper was 35.9 °C (96.6 °F) on 30 June 1976; the coldest temperature ever recorded was −10.1 °C (13.8 °F) on 13 January 1987. The average annual rainfall is 1,214.4 mm (47.81 in), with December being the wettest month.

Comparison of local Meteorological data with other cities in France
Town	Sunshine (hours/yr)	Rain (mm/yr)	Snow (days/yr)	Storm (days/yr)	Fog (days/yr)
National average	1,973	770	14	22	40
Quimper	1,684	1,249.2	6.3	14.0	60.4
Paris	1,661	637	12	18	10
Nice	2,724	767	1	29	1
Strasbourg	1,693	665	29	29	56
Brest	1,605	1,211	7	12	75

Climate data for Quimper (1991–2020 normals, extremes 1967–present)
Month	Jan	Feb	Mar	Apr	May	Jun	Jul	Aug	Sep	Oct	Nov	Dec	Year
Record high °C (°F)	16.9 (62.4)	18.6 (65.5)	23.3 (73.9)	27.1 (80.8)	30.3 (86.5)	35.9 (96.6)	35.7 (96.3)	35.8 (96.4)	31.1 (88.0)	26.8 (80.2)	19.7 (67.5)	17.7 (63.9)	35.9 (96.6)
Mean daily maximum °C (°F)	9.7 (49.5)	10.2 (50.4)	12.3 (54.1)	14.6 (58.3)	17.5 (63.5)	20.1 (68.2)	21.8 (71.2)	21.9 (71.4)	20.0 (68.0)	16.3 (61.3)	12.7 (54.9)	10.4 (50.7)	15.6 (60.1)
Daily mean °C (°F)	7.1 (44.8)	7.2 (45.0)	8.8 (47.8)	10.6 (51.1)	13.4 (56.1)	16.0 (60.8)	17.7 (63.9)	17.7 (63.9)	15.9 (60.6)	13.0 (55.4)	9.8 (49.6)	7.7 (45.9)	12.1 (53.8)
Mean daily minimum °C (°F)	4.5 (40.1)	4.1 (39.4)	5.4 (41.7)	6.6 (43.9)	9.3 (48.7)	11.9 (53.4)	13.6 (56.5)	13.6 (56.5)	11.7 (53.1)	9.8 (49.6)	6.9 (44.4)	5.1 (41.2)	8.5 (47.3)
Record low °C (°F)	−10.1 (13.8)	−8.4 (16.9)	−7.0 (19.4)	−2.2 (28.0)	0.3 (32.5)	3.9 (39.0)	6.6 (43.9)	6.9 (44.4)	4.2 (39.6)	−1.2 (29.8)	−4.6 (23.7)	−7.2 (19.0)	−10.1 (13.8)
Average precipitation mm (inches)	144.0 (5.67)	114.9 (4.52)	83.8 (3.30)	87.8 (3.46)	77.1 (3.04)	63.9 (2.52)	69.9 (2.75)	70.5 (2.78)	78.2 (3.08)	123.2 (4.85)	148.0 (5.83)	153.1 (6.03)	1,214.4 (47.81)
Average precipitation days (≥ 1.0 mm)	16.3	13.5	12.6	11.6	10.4	9.5	9.8	9.4	9.5	14.2	16.5	16.5	149.8
Mean monthly sunshine hours	66.0	89.6	133.1	177.4	201.1	208.8	204.7	194.5	175.2	112.1	78.8	66.9	1,708.2
Source 1: Météo France
Source 2: Ogimet Meteociel

== Etymology ==
The name Quimper comes from the Breton kemper, meaning "confluent", a reference to the meeting of the three rivers of the area.

== History ==
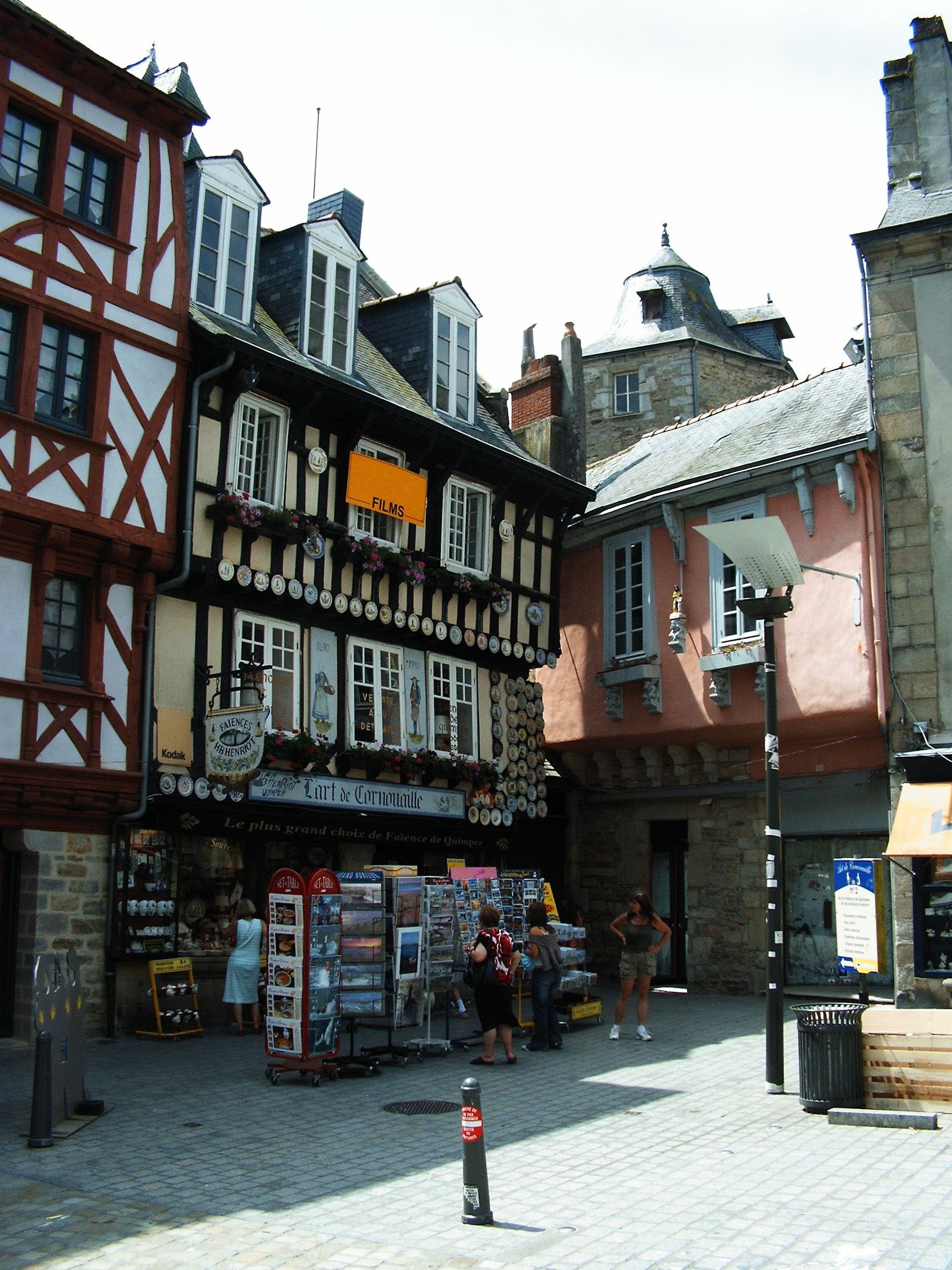
Quimper, with its vernacular architecture, is a popular tourist destination

Quimper is the ancient capital of Cornouaille, Brittany's most "traditional" region, and has a distinctive Breton-Celtic character, from music and dance traditions to linguistics and genetics; indeed, the historical name is also somewhat similar to "Cornwall", a region in southern England with distant cultural similarities. The word Quimper comes from the Breton word kemper (cognate to Welsh cymer), meaning "confluence". The town developed at the confluence of the rivers Le Steir and L'Odet. Shops and flags celebrate the region's Celtic heritage.

Quimper was originally settled during Roman times, when the area now known as France was known as Gaul. By AD 495, the town had become a Bishopric. It subsequently became the capital of the counts of Cornouailles. In the eleventh century, it was united with the Duchy of Brittany. During the War of the Breton Succession (1341–1364), the town suffered considerable ruin. In 1364, the duchy passed to the House of Montfort.

The town itself has a "rustic" atmosphere, with footbridges spanning the rivers that flow through it. The Church of Locmaria, a Romanesque structure, dates from the eleventh century. The Cathedral of Saint-Corentin, with its Gothic-style façade, was constructed between the thirteenth and sixteenth centuries, and is the oldest Gothic structure in lower Brittany. Its twin towers are 76 m (250 feet) high; its spires were added in the nineteenth century. The fifteenth-century stained glass windows are considered exceptional. The cathedral is dedicated to the 5th-century bishop Corentin, Quimper's first.

To the cathedral's west are the pedestrianised streets of Vieux Quimper (Old Quimper), which has a wide array of crêperies, half-timbered houses, and shops and cafés. Near the Episcopal palace (which now holds the Musée départemental Breton, devoted to regional history, archaeology, ethnology and economics) are the ruins of the town's fifteenth-century walls. Nearby is the Musée des beaux-arts de Quimper. The museum has a nineteenth-century façade and an entirely-rebuilt interior. It houses a collection of 14th to 21st-century paintings, including works by François Boucher, Jean-Baptiste-Camille Corot, Jean-Baptiste Oudry and Peter Paul Rubens, along with canvases by such Pont-Aven School painters as Émile Bernard, Maurice Denis, Georges Lacombe, Maxime Maufra and Paul Sérusier.

The town's best-known product is Quimper faience, a tin-glazed pottery. It has been made here since 1690, using the bold provincial designs of Jean-Baptiste Bousquet. The city has a museum devoted to faience. Quimper has also been known for copper and bronze work, galvanised ironware, hosiery, leather, paper and woollen goods, as well as being a gastronomic destination for its varied regional dishes.

Adolphe Harré was a French sailor from Quimper who died during World War I along with the 31 crew members of the SS Longwy, a French merchant vessel that was torpedoed off the coast of Scotland in 1917. Harré's body washed ashore in Scotland and was buried in Doune Cemetery in Girvan, South Ayrshire. On 12 October 2024, a memorial stele was inaugurated at the Cemetery to honour Harré and the crew of the SS Longwy. The ceremony was attended by local authorities, including the First Minister of Scotland, members of the French Navy, and dignitaries from both Scotland and France. A wreath was laid on behalf of the mayoress of Quimper and the city, symbolizing the historic ties between the French and Scottish communities, and commemorating the sacrifice of the sailors.

== Population ==
The population data in the table and graph below refer to the commune of Quimper proper, in its geography at the given years. The commune of Quimper absorbed the former communes of Ergué-Armel, Kerfunteun and Penhars in 1959. Its inhabitants are called Quimpérois.

Historical population

Year	Pop.	±% p.a.
1793	8,400	—
1800	6,651	−3.28%
1806	6,905	+0.63%
1821	9,400	+2.08%
1831	9,860	+0.48%
1836	9,715	−0.30%
1841	10,154	+0.89%
1846	10,943	+1.51%
1851	10,904	−0.07%
1856	11,450	+0.98%
1861	11,438	−0.02%
1866	12,532	+1.84%
1872	13,159	+0.82%
1876	13,879	+1.34%
1881	15,228	+1.87%
1886	17,171	+2.43%
1891	17,406	+0.27%
1896	18,557	+1.29%
1901	19,441	+0.94%

Year	Pop.	±% p.a.
1906	19,516	+0.08%
1911	19,367	−0.15%
1921	18,444	−0.49%
1926	18,686	+0.26%
1931	18,297	−0.42%
1936	18,814	+0.56%
1946	20,149	+0.69%
1954	19,352	−0.50%
1962	45,989	+11.43%
1968	52,496	+2.23%
1975	55,977	+0.92%
1982	56,907	+0.24%
1990	59,437	+0.55%
1999	63,238	+0.69%
2007	63,961	+0.14%
2012	63,360	−0.19%
2017	62,985	−0.12%
2023	64,385	+0.37%

Source: EHESS and INSEE (1968–2023)

== Breton language ==
The municipality launched a linguistic plan through Ya d'ar brezhoneg on 6 February 2008, to revive the teaching and use of Breton, the historic Celtic language of the region. In 2008, 4.61% of primary-school children attended bilingual schools.

== Education ==
Quimper has several schools. These include two Diwan pre-schools, two Diwan primary schools and one Diwan collège (all specialise in use of Breton). In total, 287 students here attended a Diwan school in 2003–2004.

== Festivals ==
While many French festivals are held in the summer season, Quimper has a winter festival: Les Hivernautes.

In the summer, concerts are held on street corners, with pipers and accordion players.

The Festival de Cornouaille, a cultural festival, is typically held in the last week of July.

== Tourism ==
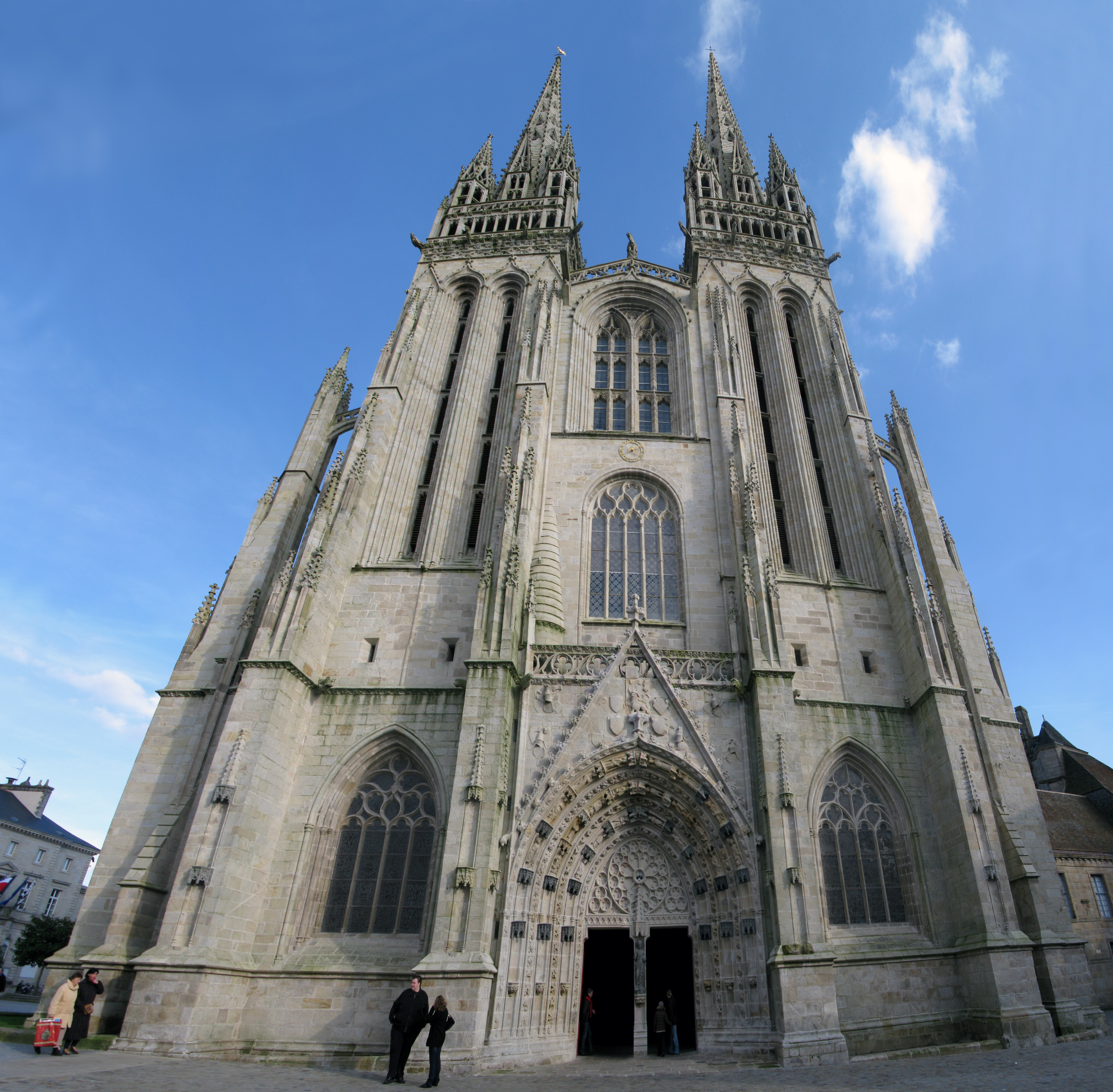
Quimper Cathedral

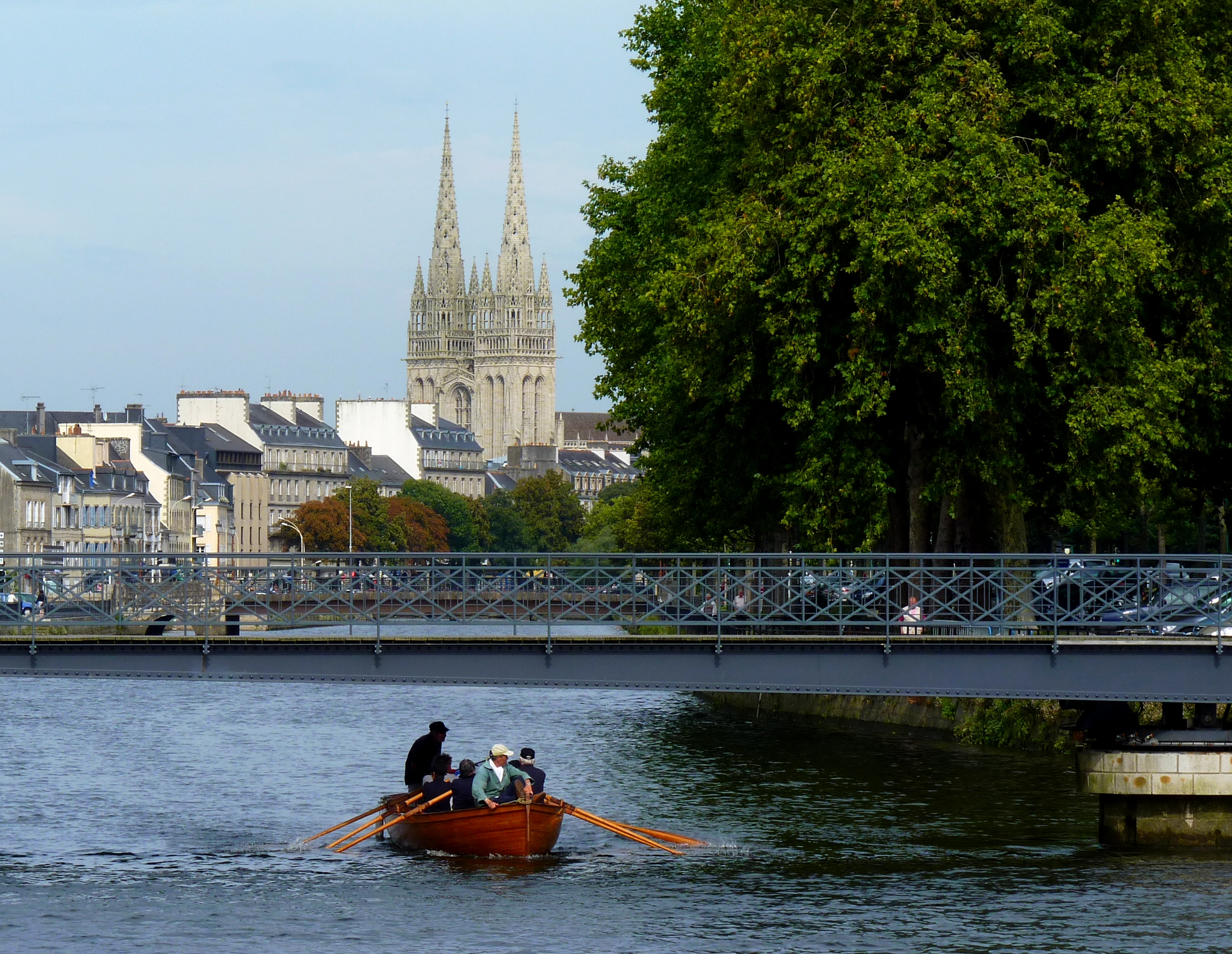
River Odet

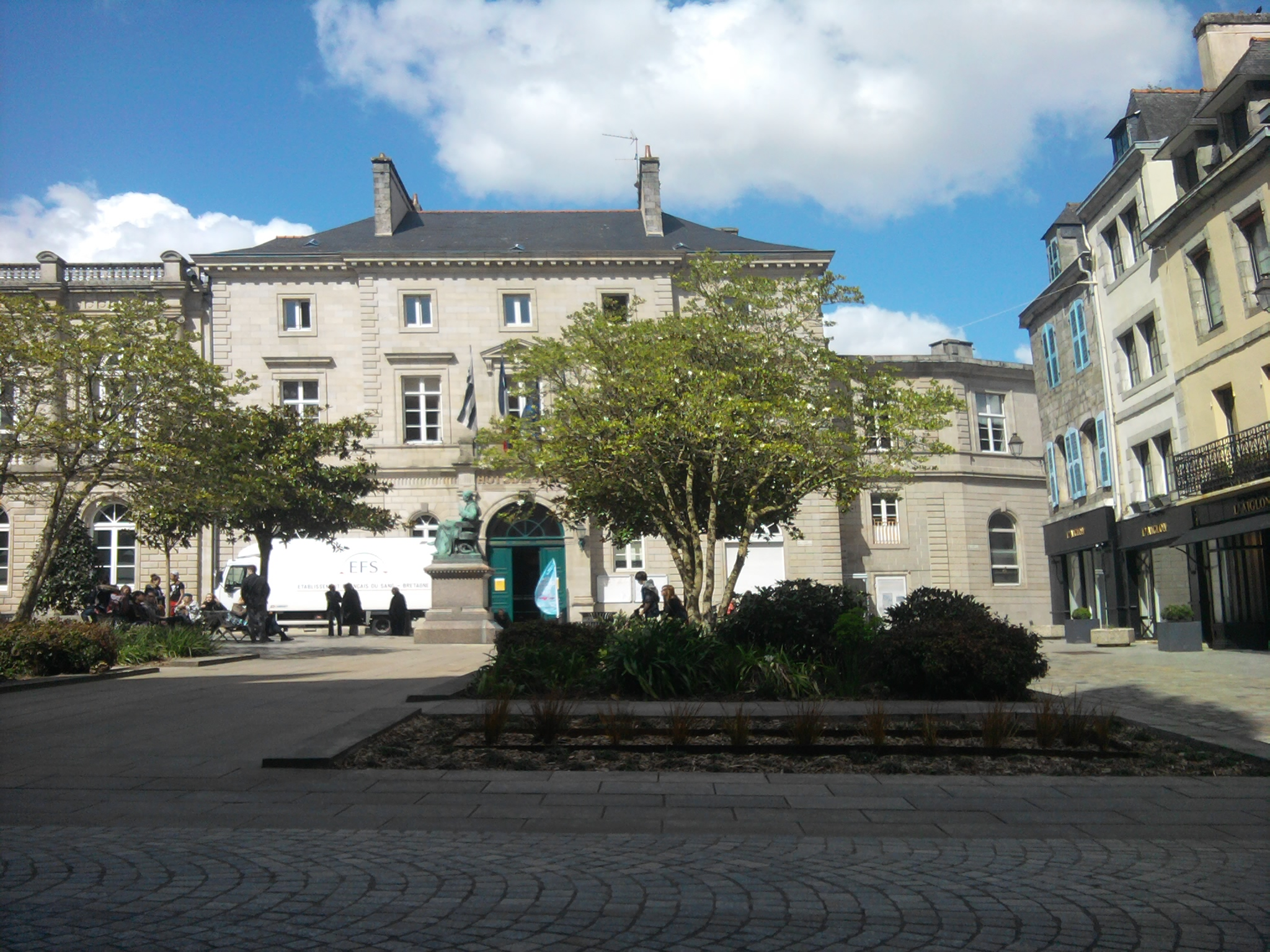
The Hôtel de Ville

Points of interest in Quimper include:

- Quimper Cathedral and the nearby statue of Gradlon (looking in the direction of Ys)
- Musée des Beaux-Arts de Quimper (near the cathedral)
- Faience museum
- The Hôtel de Ville

== Transport ==
Public transport in Quimper is provided by QUB. The network consists of seven urban bus routes and 16 suburban bus routes. During the summer months of July and August, an additional "beach" bus route is open to service.

The Gare de Quimper is the terminus of a TGV high-speed train line from Paris, which passes through Le Mans, Rennes and Vannes. Journey duration is approximately 3 hours 40 minutes. In addition, the following destinations are served by the TER Bretagne (the regional train network):

- Quimper – Brest (1 hour 9 minutes)
- Quimper – Rennes (2 hours 15 minutes)

Commercial service at Quimper–Bretagne Airport has been terminated since November 2023. The nearest major airport is Brest Bretagne Airport, located 71 km (44 mi) north west of Quimper.

== Notable people ==
Quimper is the birthplace of:

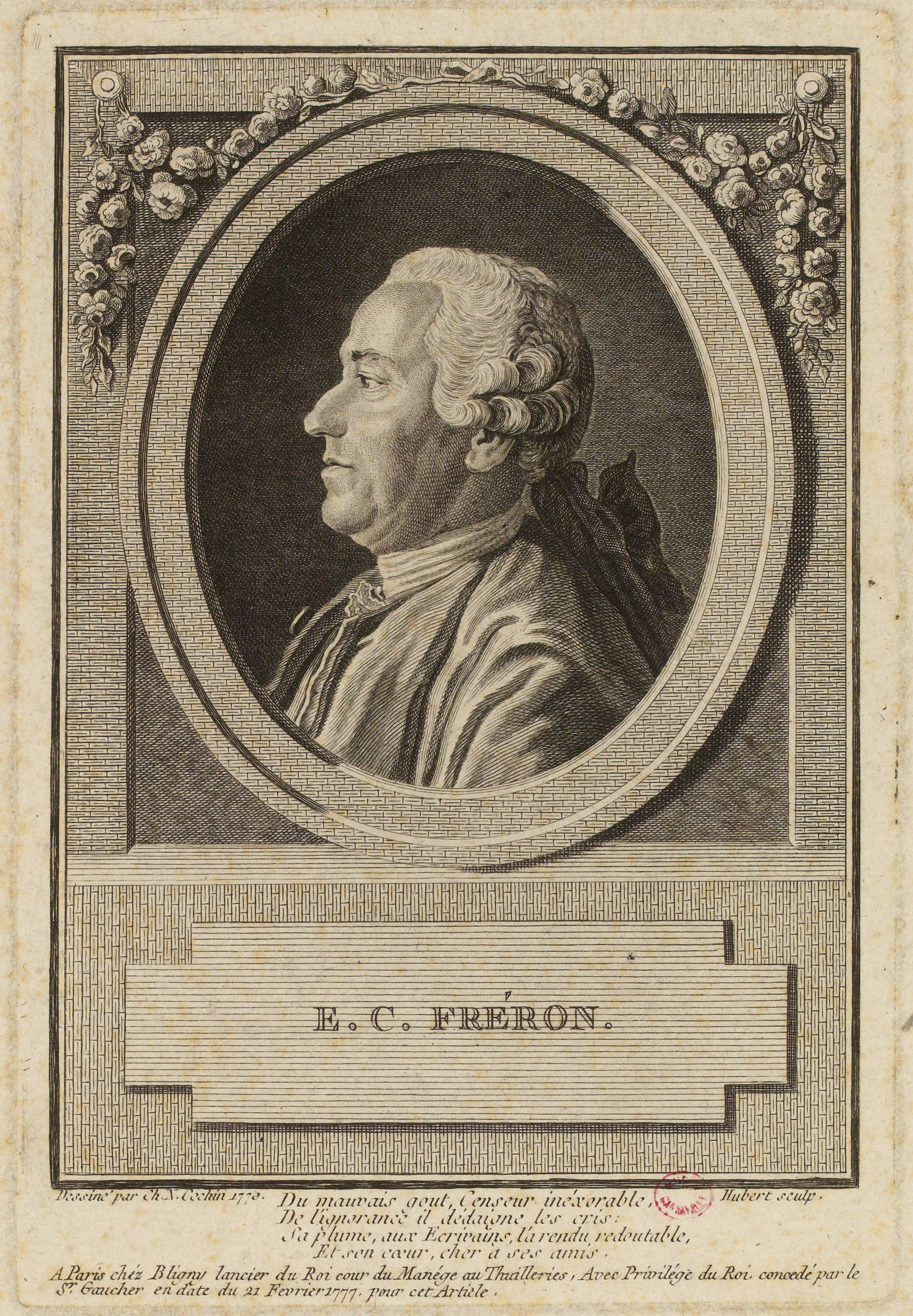
Élie Catherine Fréron

- Guillaume-Hyacinthe Bougeant (1690–1743), Jesuit author
- Louis Billouart, Chevalier de Kerlérec (1704–1770), last French governor of Louisiana
- René Cardaliaguet (1875–1950), priest and writer
- Élie Catherine Fréron (1718–1776), critic and controversialist
- Franciscus Lé Livec de Trésurin (1726–1792), French Jesuit
- Yves-Joseph de Kerguelen-Trémarec (1734–1797), explorer, admiral, discoverer of the Kerguelen archipelago
- René-Marie Madec (1736–1784), adventurer, Nawab of India. See also René Madec
- Guillaume François Laennec (1748–1822), French physician
- René Laennec (1781–1826), physician, inventor of the stethoscope
- Max Jacob (1876–1944), poet, painter, writer and critic
- Corentin Louis Kervran (1901–1983), scientist
- Philippe Poupon (born 1954), sailor
- William Stanger (born 1985), footballer
- Jacques Villeglé (1926–2022), mixed-media artist
- Jean-Claude Andro (1937–2000), novelist
- Jessica Cérival (born 1982), athlete
- Dan Ar Braz (b. 1949), guitarist
- Anne Quemere (b. 1966), sailor and sportswoman
- Clémence Quélennec (b. 1991), singer and composer

== Twin towns – sister cities ==
Quimper is twinned with:

- (Republic of Ireland) Limerick, Ireland
- Remscheid, Germany
- Laurium, Greece
- Ourense, Spain
- Yantai, China
- Foggia, Italy

== See also ==
- Communes of the Finistère department
- François Bazin (sculptor)
- Henri Alphonse Barnoin
- Henri Guinier
- Lionel Floch
- List of the works of Charles Cottet depicting scenes of Brittany
- List of works of the two Folgoët ateliers
