= Hôtel de Ville, Quimper =

Town hall in Quimper, France

Hôtel de Ville
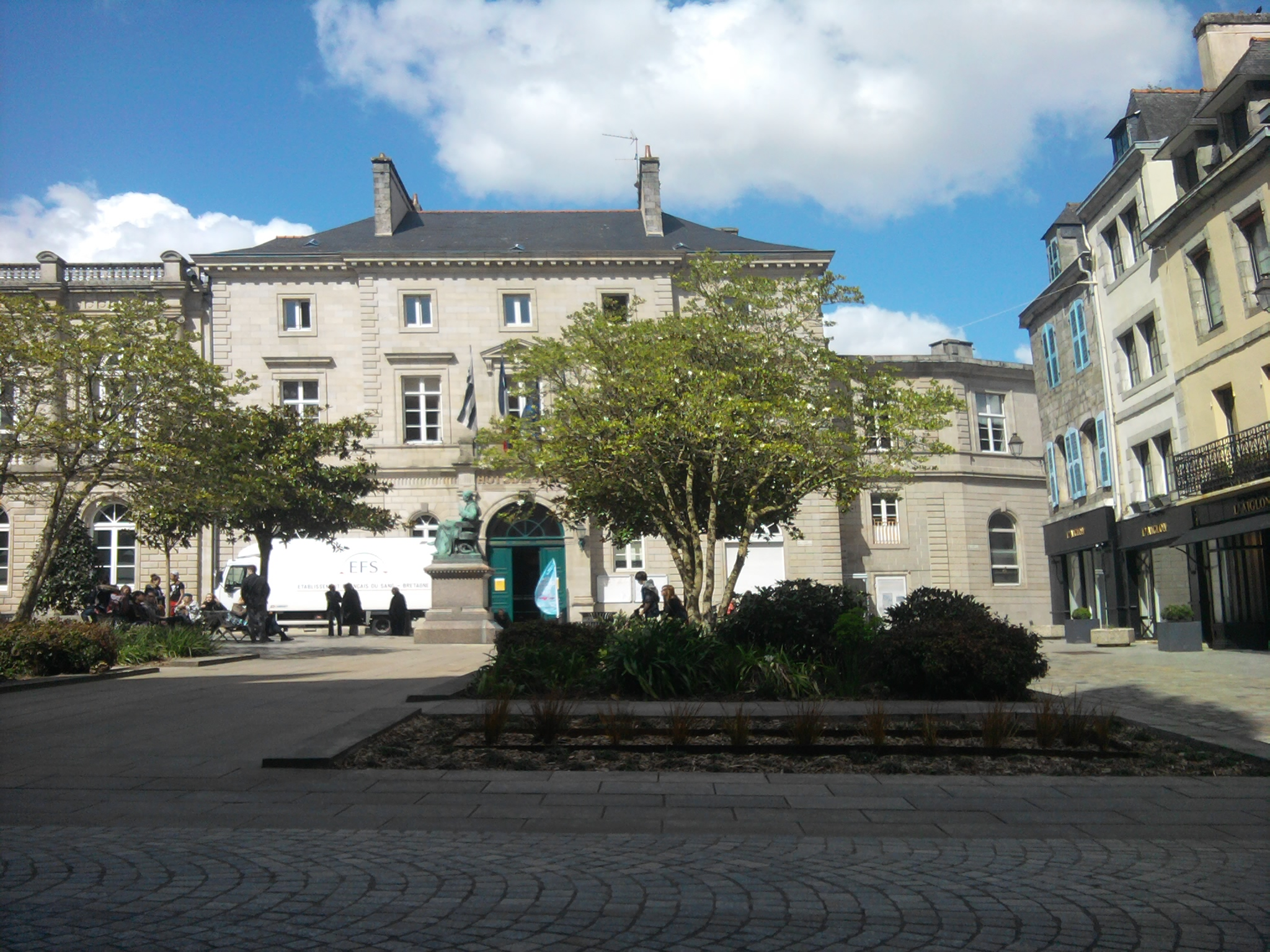
- The main frontage of the Hôtel de Ville in April 2013
- Interactive map of the Hôtel de Ville area

General information
- Type: City hall
- Architectural style: Italianate style
- Location: Quimper, France
- Coordinates: 47.9963°N 4.1020°W
- Completed: 1831

Design and construction
- Architect: François Marie Lemarié

The Hôtel de Ville (French pronunciation: [otɛl də vil], City Hall) is a municipal building in Quimper, Finistère, western France, standing on Place Saint-Corentin.

== History ==
Following the French Revolution, the town council initially established offices in the Couvent des Cordeliers (Convent of the Cordeliers). However, this arrangement only lasted a year before it relocated to the l'Hôpital du ci-devant Sainte Catherine (the hospital of Saint Catherine above). The convent and the hospital had both been confiscated by the state and the nuns driven out during the French Revolution.

In the early 19th century, the town council decided to acquire the Hôtel de Guernisac on the north side of Place Saint-Corentin for use as a town hall. The acquisition was completed in 1805 and officials moved into the building in 1808. However, the old building was inefficient, and the council decided to demolish it and to erect a new town hall on the same site. The foundation stone for the new building was laid in 1829. It was designed by François Marie Lemarié in the Italianate style, built in ashlar stone and was officially opened on 31 December 1831.

The design involved a symmetrical main frontage of five bays facing onto the Place Saint-Corentin. The central section of three bays, which was slightly projected forward, featured a round headed doorway with a moulded surround and a keystone, flanked by a pair of Doric order pilasters supporting an entablature and a parapet. There was a square headed window with a pediment supported by brackets on the first floor. The other bays on the ground floor were fenestrated by round headed windows and the other bays on the first floor were fenestrated by squared headed windows with cornices, while the bays on the second floor were fenestrated entirely by small square windows. There were quoins at the corners of the central section and of the outer bays and there was a modillioned cornice at roof level. Internally, the principal room was the Salle du Conseil (council chamber).

A statue by the sculptor, Eugène-Louis Lequesne, depicting the inventor of the stethoscope, René Laennec, was unveiled in front of the town hall on 15 August 1868. After the First World War, a plaque was unveiled on the staircase in the building to commemorate the lives of 556 local service personnel who had died in the war. The building was extended to the northeast, to provide accommodation for the registry office, in 1938.

Following the liberation of the town by the French Forces of the Interior on 8 August 1944, during the Second World War, a banner was spread across the town hall saying (in English) "Welcome US Army". After Quimper amalgamated with the municipalities of Ergué-Armel, Kerfeunteun and Penhars in 1959, a further large extension, stretching back to Rue Verdelet was completed in the 1960s.
