= Franciscus Lé Livec de Trésurin =

French Jesuit

Franciscus Lé Livec de Trésurin (1726–1792) was a French Jesuit who was one of the victims of the September Massacres.

He died in the prison of La Force.

He was a philosophy lecturer as well as serving as treasurer of the Jesuit college.

He was beatified by Pope Pius XI on 17 October 1926.
