= Musée des Beaux-Arts de Quimper =

Art museum located in Quimper, France

Musée des beaux-arts de Quimper
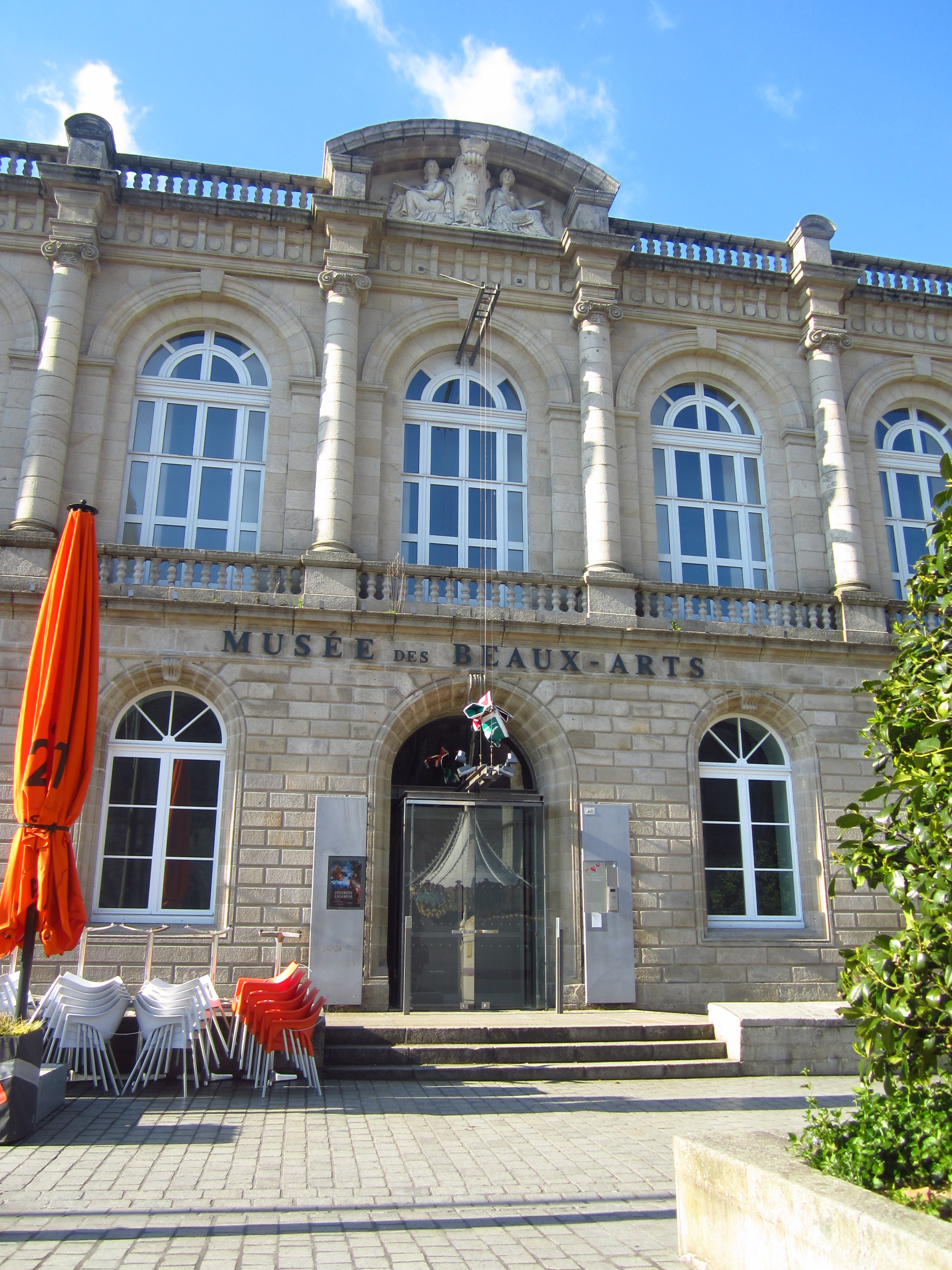
- Musée des beaux-arts de Quimper
- Interactive fullscreen map
- Established: 1864
- Location: Quimper, Brittany, France
- Coordinates: 47.9963°N 4.1023°W
- Collections: Paintings and sculptures from the 14th to 18th centuries, Paintings and sculptures from the 19th to 20th centuries, Drawings, Prints, Art, Antiques.
- Website: musee-beauxarts.quimper.fr

The Musée des Beaux-Arts de Quimper is an art museum located in Quimper, Brittany, France. It was founded after Jean-Marie de Silguy (1785–1864) left a legacy of 1200 paintings and 2000 drawings to the town of Quimper on condition that the town build a museum to accommodate them. Today, it is one of the principal art museums in western France, presenting rich collections of French, Italian, Flemish, and Dutch paintings from the 14th century to present day.

== History ==
Count Jean-Marie de Silguy's collection of 1,200 paintings, 2,000 drawings, and 12,000 prints is the core of the first museum in Quimper. The museum was built in Quimper's main square and is facing the cathedral and adjacent to the Hôtel de Ville. The building's construction was left to architect Joseph Bigot in 1867, who also built the spire of the cathedral. The works debuted in 1869 and the museum was opened on August 15, 1872.

The museum was entirely renovated by architect Jean-Paul Philippon under the direction of André Cariou in 1993. Behind the front face of the museum, it was entirely redone according to modern architectural choices, founded on the principle of transparency. It permitted better exposure of the works and a notable gain in status. Since the renovations, 700 works have been displayed permanently and a specific space is dedicated to temporary expositions that can be created. The museum also has an auditorium, a reception service, and a bookstore.

== Collections ==
=== Old Masters ===
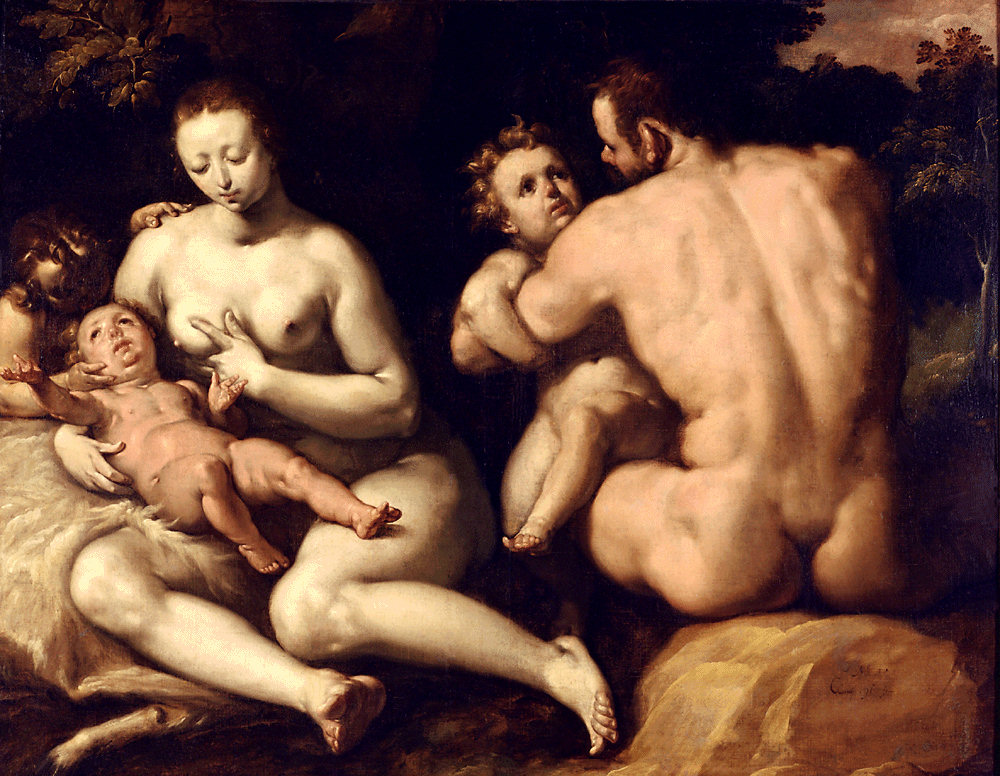
Cornelis Cornelisz van Haarlem, La première Famille (around 1582–1592), oil on canvas.

The complete collection of sculptures from French schools from the 17th and 18th centuries and painters such as Lubin Baugin, Pierre Mignard (‘‘La Foi’’ and ‘’L’Espérance’’, 1692), Nicolas Loir, Jean Jouvenet, Nicolas Largillière (‘’Nature morte avec instrument de musique’’, 1695-1700), Noël Hallé (‘’La nuit’’, around 1753), François Boucher (‘’L’Enlèvement de Proserpine’’, 1769), Carle Van Loo, Louis Tocqué, Jean-Honoré Fragonard (‘’Le Combat de Minerve contre Mars’’, around 1771), Louis Jean François Lagrenée (‘’Esther et Assuérus’’, 1775-1780), Claude Joseph Vernet (‘’Marine, clair de lune’’, 1772 and ‘’Le Pêcheur à la ligne’’, 1788), Hubert Robert (‘’Fête de nuit, donnée par la Reine’’, 1782-1783), Antoine-François Callet, Adélaïde Labille-Guiard, or again, Pierre-Henri de Valenciennes (‘’Narcisse se mirant dans l'eau’’ and ‘’Biblis changée en fontaine’’, 1792-1793).

The northern schools (Flanders and Holland), well represented by the legacy of the Count of Silguy, are presented with, among others, paintings by Frans Floris, Cornelis Cornelisz van Haarlem (‘’Le Première Famille’’, 1589, one of the masterpieces, and ‘’Adam et Eve au paradis terrestre’’, 1625), Pieter Bruegel le Jeune (‘’La Danse de noce’’), Joos de Momper, Rubens (‘’The Martyre de Sainte Lucie’’, around 1620), Jacob Jordaens (‘’Mater Dolorosa’’, 1617-1620), David Vinckboons, Frans Francken the Younger, Jan Van Bijlert (‘’Femme et Enfant’’, around 1630), Pieter De Grebber (‘’La Vierge enseignant à lire à l'Enfant Jésus’’, around 1630), Jacques d'Arthois, Abraham Govaerts, Jan van Goyen, Jan Van Kessel, Otto Marseus van Schrieck (‘’Chardons, Ecureuil, Reptiles et Insectes’’, around 1660), Nicolaes Maes (‘’Portrait d’une Jeune Femme’’, around 1676), Ferdinand Bol, Gérard de Lairesse.

Italy, on the other hand, was represented by a smaller group, but with works of quality, with artists such as Bartolo di Fredi, Francesco Bassano le jeune, Nicolò dell'Abate (‘’Sleeping Venus’’), L'Albane, Guido Reni, Francesco Solimena (a beautiful set of four paintings), Francesco Trevisani, Sano di Pietro (Madonna and Child) and Giovanni Battista Pittoni (‘’Nativité’’). Some works of the Spanish school complete this panorama of ancient European painting, including Antonio González Velázquez a ‘’Christophe Colomb offrant le Nouveau Monde aux Rois Catholiques’’, a sketch for a fresco of the Royal Palace of Madrid.

=== 19th to 20th century paintings ===
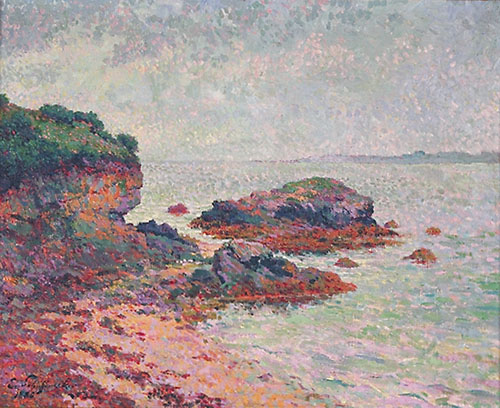
Émile Schuffenecker, Côte rocheuse en Bretagne (1886), oil on canvas

The collection includes the works of Breton painters themselves and artists attracted by the landscapes and peasantry of Brittany in the late 19th and 20th centuries, such as the Nabis painters of the School of Pont-Aven. Among these painters, one will find exhibited at the museum: Évariste-Vital Luminais, Eugène Boudin (including Noces à Quimper in 1857, work acquired in 2012), James McNeill Whistler (La Côte de Bretagne), Paul Gauguin, Paul Sérusier, Émile Bernard, Georges Lacombe, Maximilien Luce (Côte rocheuse, 1893), Maxime Maufra, Charles Camoin, Paul Ranson, Meyer de Haan or, again, Félix Vallotton, Maurice Denis and Albert Marquet. The museum also has works by other major artists of the 19th century like Théodore Chassériau or Camille Corot.

=== Drawings ===
The office of graphic arts contains drawings from the foremost European painting schools, the 2,000 drawings left by de Silguy also formed most of the collection here. The collection controlled by the french school and, in a lower measure, by Italians. The northern schools and the Spanish are represented very little.

The French collection is fullest. The 17th century is illustrated by the works of Jacques Callot, Simon Vouet, Jacques Stella, Eustache Le Sueur, Charles Le Brun, Jacques Courtois or, again, François Verdier. But it is especially the 18th century that demonstrates charm in the similar kinds of collections held by the museum, that allows for retelling of all the developments of art in France during that century. Most of the major artists that showed styles from Rococo to Neoclassicism are: Antoine Watteau, François Lemoyne, Charles Parrocel, Jean Restout the Younger, Edme Bouchardon, Natoire (a study on ‘’Vénus à sa toilette’’, in the Bordeaux Museum of Fine Arts), François Boucher (‘’Une Paysage et La Continence de Scipion’’, study for a command by the King of Poland never realized), Carle Van Loo (several drawings with a study for Agamemnon in the piece Sacrifice d’Iphigénie in Palace of Sanssouci in Potsdam), Jean-Honoré Fragonard, Gabriel de Saint-Aubin, Jean-Baptiste Greuze, Jean-Jacques and Louis Jean François Lagrenée, Hubert Robert (with a lot of drawings), Jean-Baptiste Huet, François-André Vincent, Louis-François Cassas, François-Xavier Fabre or François Gérard.

The Italian school, of the Renaissance of the 18th century, counts some beautiful works, notably Nicolò dell'Abate, Luca Cambiaso, Domenico Piola, Giovanni Paolo Pannini, Giambattista Tiepolo, Francesco Fontebasso and Piranèse. The 19th century mainly counts, among others, some drawings from Louis-Léopold Boilly, Paul Sérusier, Émile Bernard, etc.

=== Prints ===
- Count de Silguy’s legacy is known to have 12,000 prints that constitute the heart of the print collection in the museum today.

=== Medals ===
- Georges Lacombe (1868-1916) : Médaillon de Paul Ronson

=== Sculptures ===
- Georges Lacombe (1868-1916) : Buste de Paul Sérusier, circa 1905-1906, bronze.

=== Homages ===
==== Max Jacob ====
A room in the museum is dedicated to Max Jacob, a Quimper native. There, one will find many works of Jacob himself (gouaches, pencil drawings, prints, etc.) and his entourage : notably Jean Cocteau (drawings), Picasso (strong on all three), Roger Toulouse, and Amedeo Modigliani (drawings).

==== Jean Moulin ====
Jean Moulin was a senior official before becoming an emblematic figure of the Resistance, serving as the sub-prefect in Chateaulin from 1930 to 1933. During his trip to Brittany, he encountered Max Jacob and by his advice, illustrated the collection of Tristan Corbière’s poems. He signed the 8 prints under the pseudonym “Romanin”

==== Jean-Julien Lemordant ====
At the heart of the museum, in a specially designed space, an exceptional ensemble of Jean-Julien Lemordant’s paintings are shown. At other times, they decorate the restaurant in l’Hotel de l’Épée in Quimper.

== Appendices ==
=== Bibliography ===
- André Cariou, catalog of permanent collections in the Musée Des Beaux-Arts De Quimper, Edition du musée des beaux-arts, 2012, 144 p.
