= René-Marie Madec =

French adventurer (1736–1784)

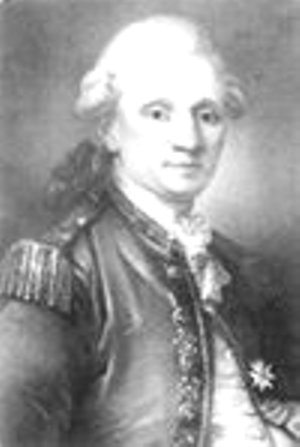
René Madec (1736–1784).

René-Marie Madec (February 7, 1736 – 1784), called Medoc in Anglo-Indian writings, was a French adventurer in India.

Madec was born at Quimper in Brittany to poor parents.

Aged twelve, he embarked as ship's boy on a boat from Lorient heading for the island of Hispaniola (present day Dominican Republic). From there, he embarked for Pondichéry, a French trading post in India. Madec lived there for about twenty five years, sometimes a French corsair, sometimes a British corsair. He became a soldier under Joseph François Dupleix and sergeant under Lally-Tollendal. Being taken prisoner by the British, he enlisted in the Bengal army. Deserting with some of his companions shortly before the Battle of Buxar (1764), he became military instructor to various native princes, organizing successively the forces of Shuja-ud-Dowlah the Nawab of Oudh, and of the Jats and Rohillas.

In 1772 he took service under the Mughal Emperor Shah Alam II, who gave him the title of Nawab, reserved to the highest dignitaries of the Sultan's court. When that prince was defeated at Delhi by the Marathas, Madec rejoined his own countrymen in Puducherry, where he took an active part in the defence of the town (1778). He became the King of the Deccan, defender of the Indies for the King of France and accumulated great wealth.

After the capitulation of Puducherry, in 1779, he returned to France with a considerable fortune. The King appointed him Colonel and named him Chevalier de Saint Louis. He then settled in Quimper, at house number 5 of the street which nowadays bears his name, not far from his birth-house. He lived a fabulous life until a bad fall off a horse in 1784. He died soon thereafter. He is buried in the graveyard at Penhars.

At one point of time he formed a scheme of a French alliance with the Mughal Emperor against the British, but the project came to nothing.

== Bibliography ==
- Émile Barbé. Le Nabab Rene Madec, Histoire Diplomatique des Projets de la France sur le Bengale et le Pendjab, (1772-1808). 1894, Paris: Ancienne Librairie Germer Bailliere Et Cie. Felix Alcan (ed.) OCLC 697959353. English translation by Yog Mehta (2023), ISBN 979-8865856191.
- Deloche, Jean. (1983). Mémoire de René Madec, Nabab dans l'Empire Mogol, Commandant d'un Parti français au Service de l'Empereur (1736-1784). Max Vignes (Ed.) Alliance Francaise de Pondichery. OCLC 32304718.
