= Guillaume François Laennec =

French physician (1748–1822)

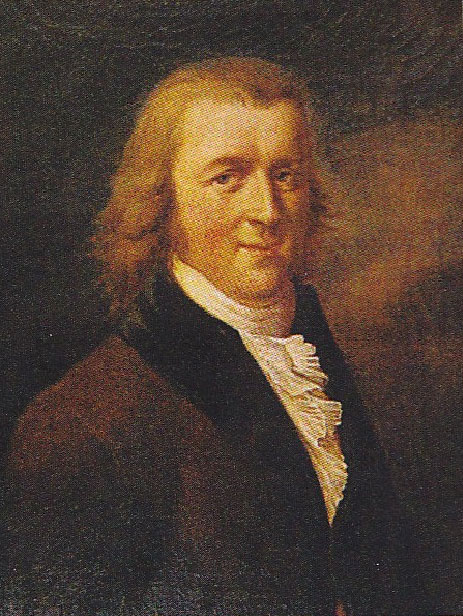
Guillaume François Portrait

Guillaume François Laennec (11 November 1748 – 8 February 1822) was a French medical doctor and the uncle of René Laennec, whom he looked after as a child.
