= Joséphine Pencalet =

French trade unionist (1886–1972)

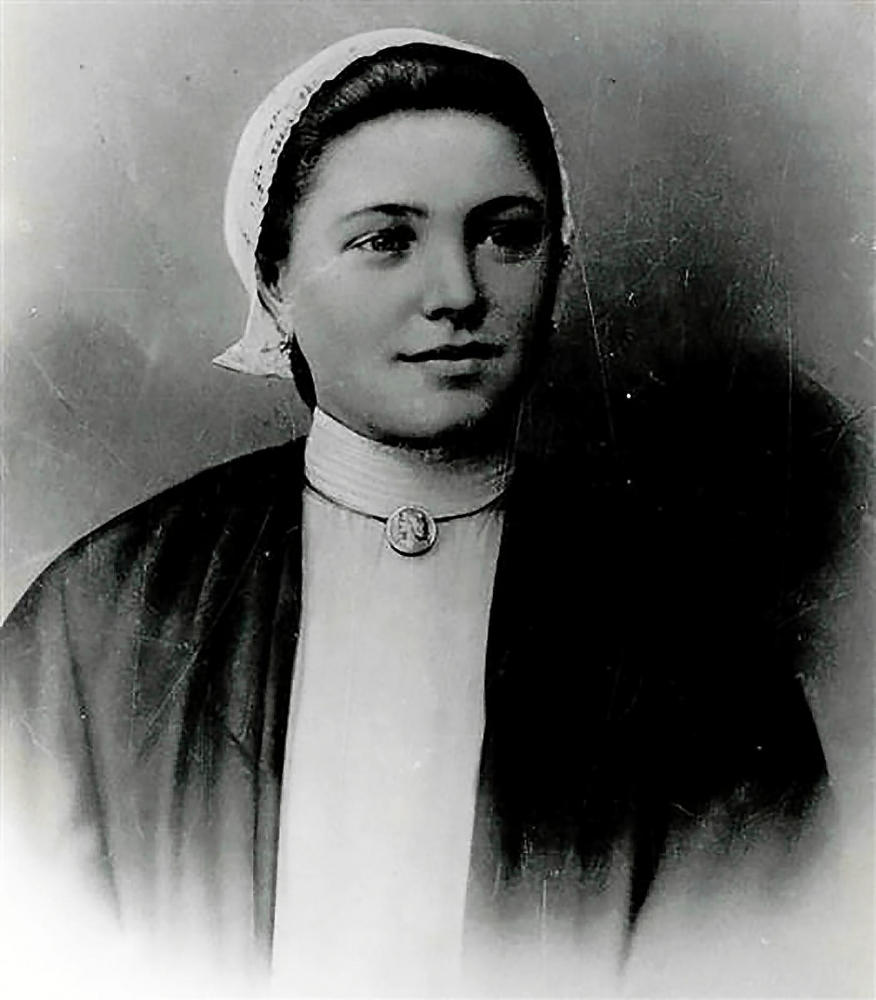
- Pencalet in 1906

Municipal Councillor of Douarnenez
- In office 17 May 1925 – 27 November 1925

Personal details
- Born: 13 August 1886 Douarnenez, Brittany, France
- Died: 13 July 1972 (aged 85) Douarnenez, Brittany, France
- Children: 2
- Occupation: Fish cannery worker, laundress

Joséphine Pencalet (10 August 1886 – 13 July 1972) was a French trade unionist. She was elected as a municipal councillor in 1925 and was one of the first women elected in France, 19 years before women's suffrage.

== Early life ==
Pencalet was born to a large working-class family in Douarnenez, a fishing community in Brittany, France. She was the twelfth of 13 children. When she was around 12 years old, her mother died, and she may have started working at one of the many sardine canneries in the town.

After finishing primary school, Pencalet left home and worked as a laundress near Paris. When she was 21, she married a railway worker named Léon Frédéric Le Ray, and together they had a son and a daughter. Le Ray died of typhoid fever in 1923, and the newly-widowed Pencalet decided to return to Douarnenez with her children. She began working at a sardine cannery in town.

== Trade unionism and election ==
In November 1924, Pencalet joined the sardine workers' strike. The workers demanded higher wages, and the strike gained national attention. After seven weeks, the strike ended in January 1925, and the workers earned a number of concessions from the cannery company: an increased hourly wage, higher pay for night shifts, and the right to unionize without facing retaliation.

After the success of the strike, Douarnenez's communist mayor, Daniel Le Flanchec, encouraged Pencalet to run for office in the 1925 municipal elections. Her candidacy was part of the Bloc ouvrier et paysan (the workers' and peasants' bloc), a strategic initiative by the Communist Party of France to serve the proletarian struggle and develop esprit de classe, or class consciousness, among the working poor. She placed 24th in the election with 1,283 votes, which met the threshold for a position, and thus became one of the first women elected in France on 17 May 1925, 19 years before women's suffrage. During this time, she also served as assistant secretary in the Syndicat des Métaux de Douarnenez (transl. Metalworkers Union of Douarnenez).

However, because women were not allowed to vote in France in 1925, the local administrative court challenged Pencalet's election to the council. She argued that the law did not explicitly ban women from holding office, but was unsuccessful. Despite supporting her initial election, the Communist Party did not support her when her victory was challenged in court. Ultimately, the courts ruled that she was ineligible for elected office, and annulled her victory on 17 May. She served in office for 5 more months until the Conseil d'État upheld the lower court's ruling on 27 November.

== Later life and death ==
After her election victory was invalidated, Pencalet retreated from public politics and never voted again. She died in Douarnenez at the age of 85.
