= La Bretagne ouvrière, paysanne et maritime =

1935–1950 weekly newspaper in Brittany, France

- May 1, 1941 issue of La Bretagne ouvrière, paysanne et maritime
- Type: Weekly; irregular underground publication during the Second World War
- Founded: October 5, 1935
- Ceased publication: 1950
- Political alignment: Communist
- Language: French language

La Bretagne ouvrière, paysanne et maritime ('Workers', Peasants' and Sailors' Brittany') was a weekly newspaper published 1935–1950 in Brittany, France. It was a regional organ of the French Communist Party in Brittany.

The newspaper was launched on October 5, 1935, by Auguste Havez. The launching of the new publication was helped by the communist parliamentarian Alain Signor. The newspaper was initially published from Douarnenez. It replaced the publication La République ouvrière et paysanne ('The Workers' and Peasants' Republic'). La Bretagne ouvrière, paysanne et maritime was distributed throughout Finistère, Côtes-du-Nord and a section of Morbihan.

La Bretagne ouvrière, paysanne et maritime was banned, along with all other communist newspapers, by the Daladier government in 1939. Around March/April 1941 it re-appeared as a clandestine publication in Brest, no longer as a weekly. It was distributed in Rennes and Nantes. A handful of copies of the newspaper from this period are archived at the French National Library.

In the post-war era, La Bretagne ouvrière, paysanne et maritime was the organ of the Finistère Federation of the Communist Party. The newspaper was closed down in June 1950.
