= Maurice Le Scouëzec =

French painter

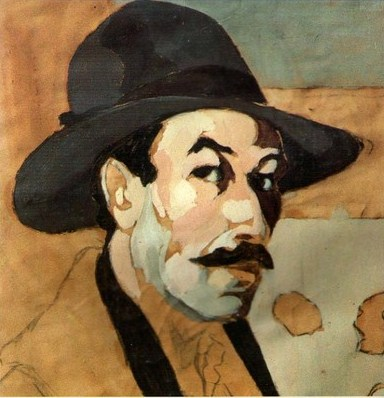
Maurice Le Scouezec Portrait 2.

Maurice Le Scouëzec, was born in Mans on 1 October 1881 and died at Douarnenez on the 1 May 1940. He was a French artist, engraver, illustrator and writer.

== Biography ==
His son Gwenc’hlan Le Scouëz has written a biography of his father.

Born in Le Mans, Maurice Le Scouëzec's father was a Breton and worked as an inspector for the "Chemins de fer de l'Ouest". Maurice Le Scouëzec frequented the artist's quarter in Paris of Montparnasse and then set off on various voyages around the world on tall ships. He finally returned to France and died in Douarnenez. In an eventful life he had been a sailor, soldier, globe-trotter/adventurer and a painter and worked with painters such as Pablo Picasso and Amedeo Modigliani.

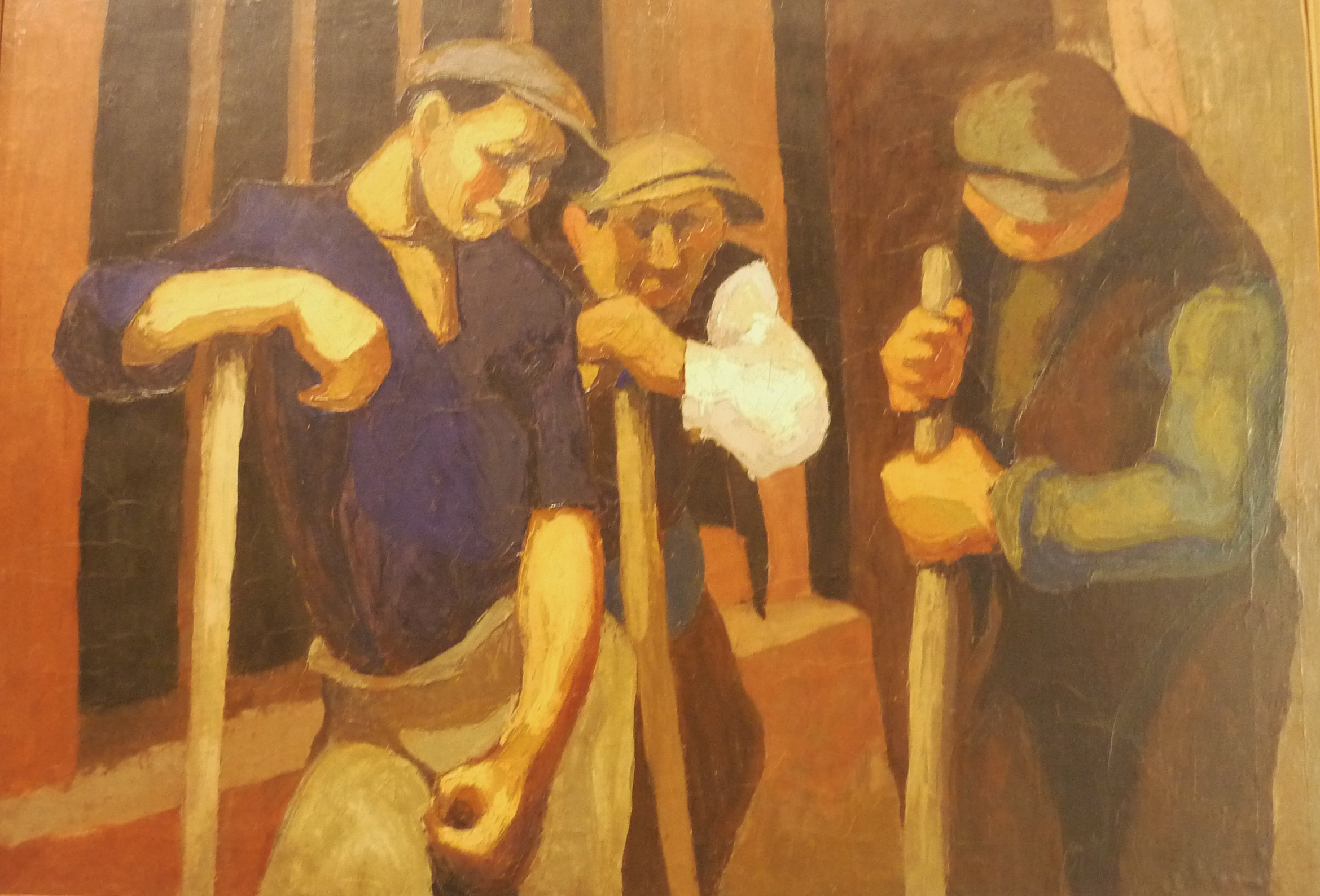
Maurice Le Scouëzec "Les ouvriers". Executed whilst living in Montparnasse in 1925

== Works executed during times spent in Africa ==
During his stays in the Sudan and Madagascar he completed many evocative and realistic paintings depicting life in African villages. He exhibited his canvases at the ""Salon d’automne". He completed many paintings depicting Brittany.

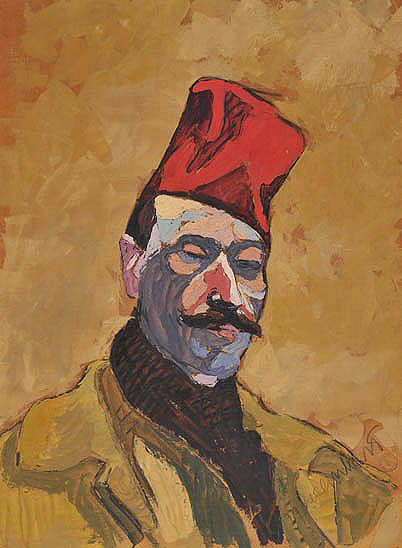
1918 self-portrait in Algerian dress.

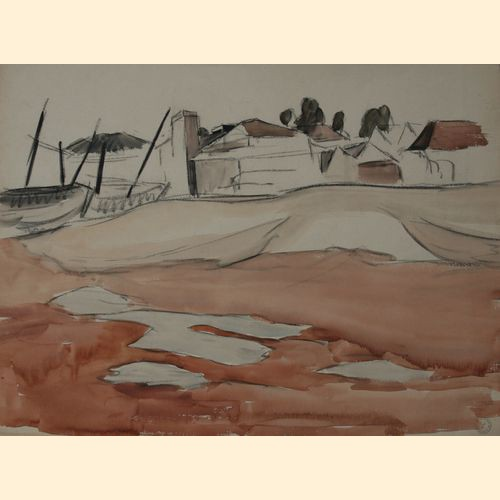
Maurice Le Scouëzec. Port rouge in Madagascar

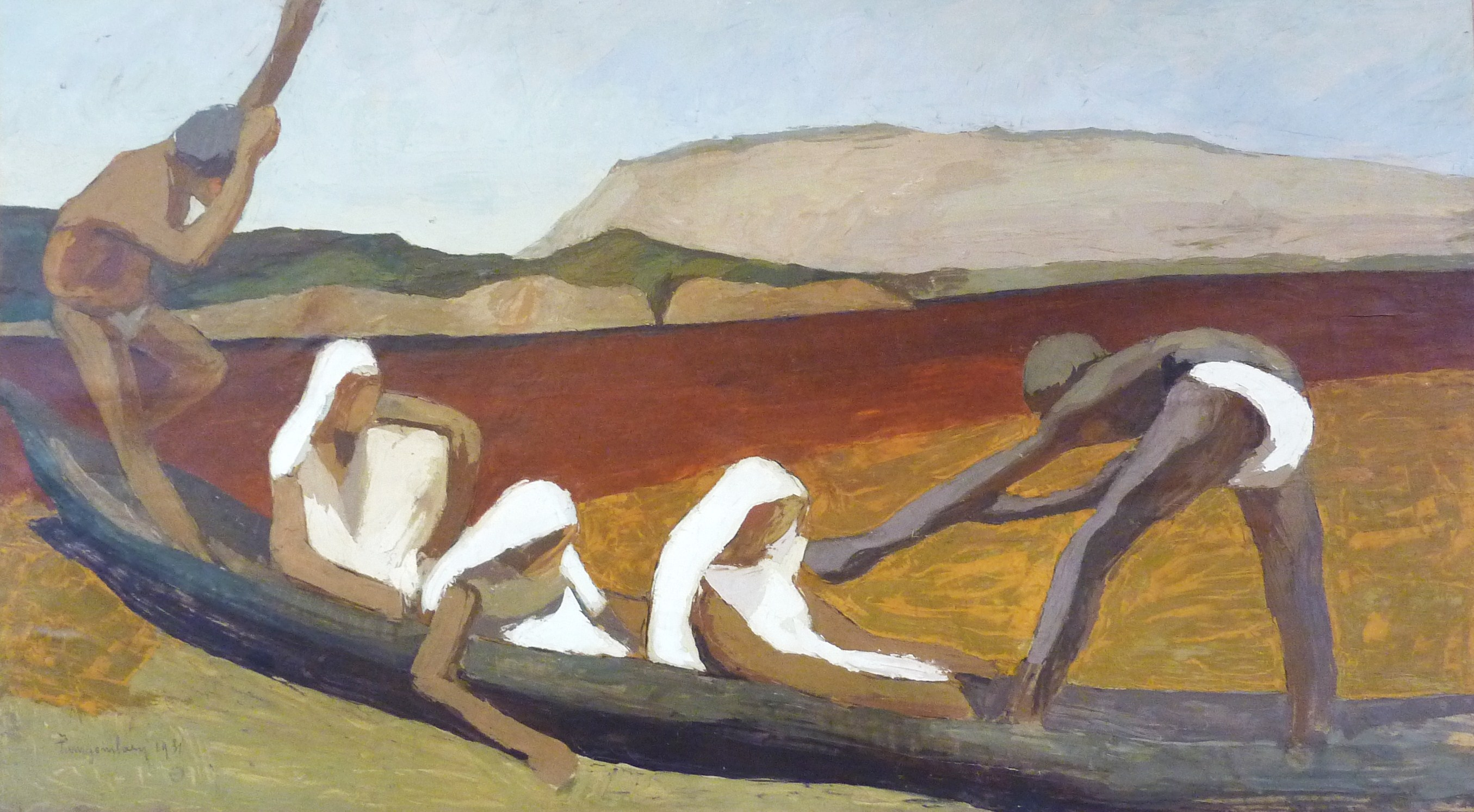
Maurice Le Scouëzec. A canoe In Madagascar

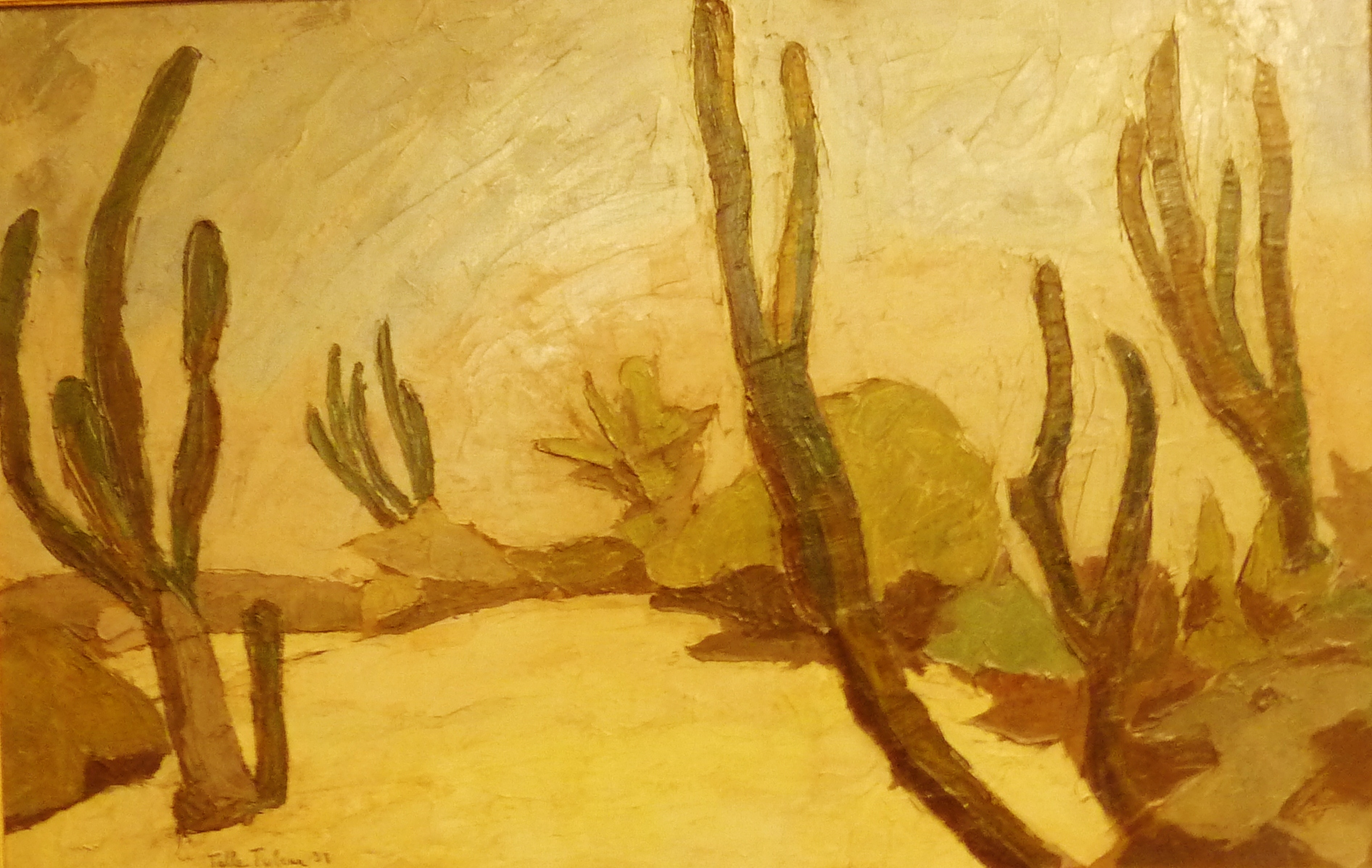
Maurice Le Scouëzec. A "cactus candélalabre" at Tuléar in Madagascar.

== The frescoes at Pont-d'Ouilly ==
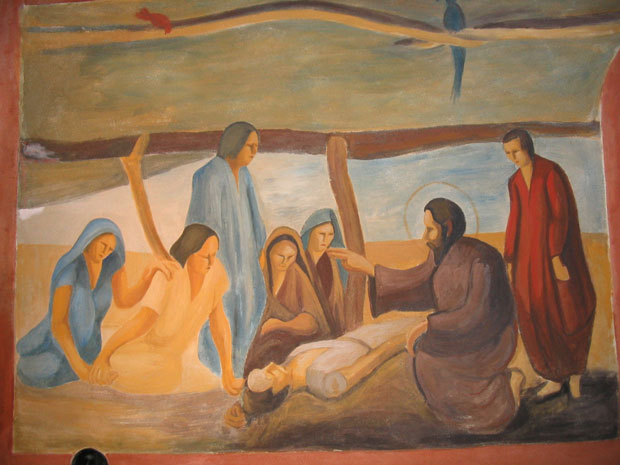
Saint Roch guérit les pestiférés. 1932 fresco at Pont-d'Ouilly's Saint-Roch chapel. Painting depicts Saint Roch curing a victim of the plague

In 1932, Le Scouëzec was commissioned to paint nine frescoes for the chapel Saint-Roch at Pont-d'Ouilly. These depicted scenes from the saint's life. Eight frescoes adorned the chapel's walls and depicted the saint's birth, his refusal of meat on a Friday, the saint distributing toys, the saint leaving for Rome on a pilgrimage, his reception at Aquapendente, the saint sick in a forest, the saint curing the victims of the plague and then in prison. A ninth fresco is located behind the altar and depicts Saint Roch et les Anges. The frescoes on the chapel's lateral walls were restored by the Polish artist Marek Sobczyk between 1982-1984, and in 2003 Jean Bonavita worked on restoring the frescoes on the south wall.

== Decoration of the "salle des fêtes" in the Douarnenez town hall ==
In 1938 he painted two frescoes for the "salle des fêtes", one entitled Le village de Pouldavid and the second La plage du Ris. These were classified as "monument historique" in 1997.

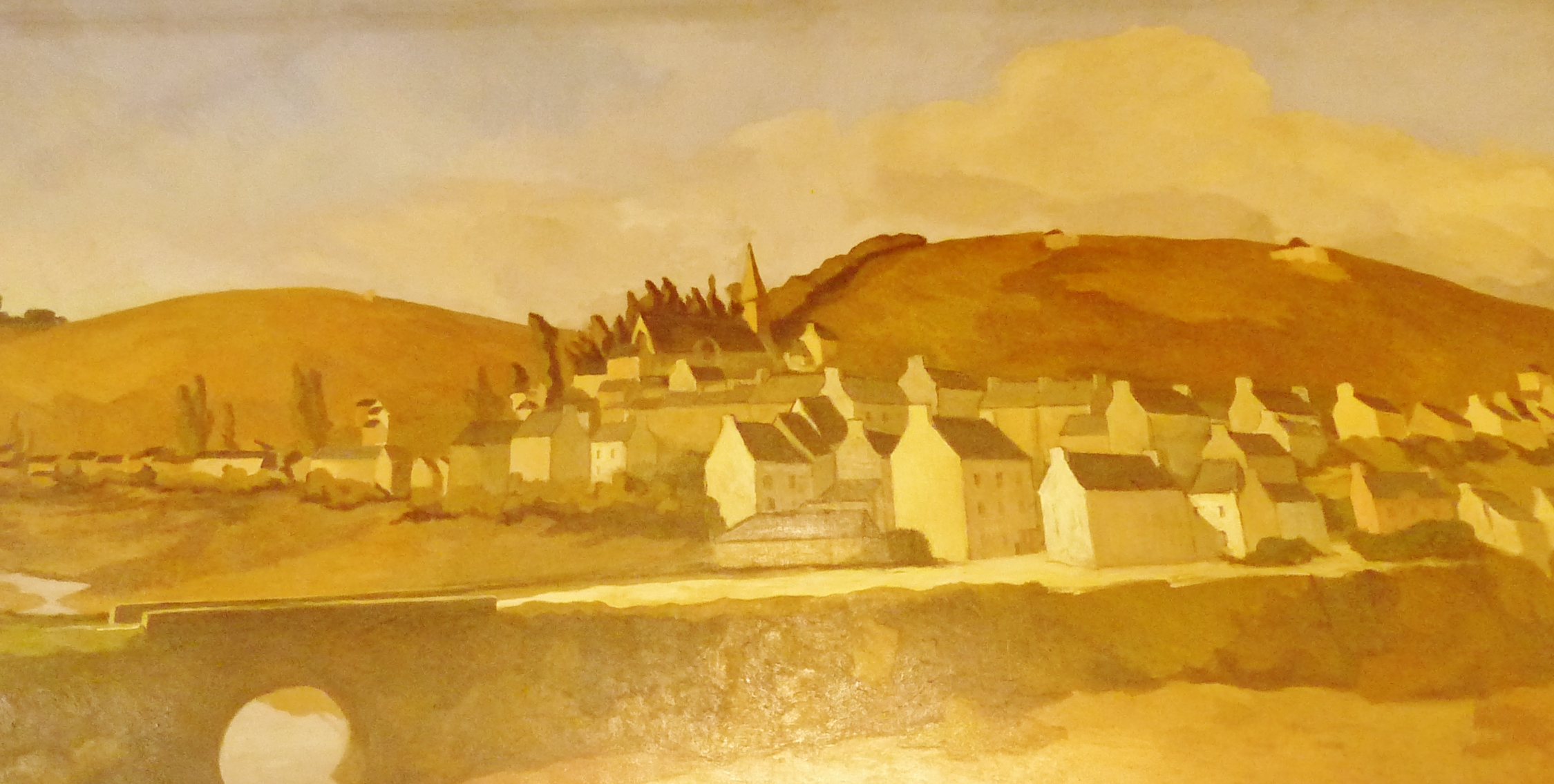
Maurice Le Scouëzec : Le village de Pouldavid.

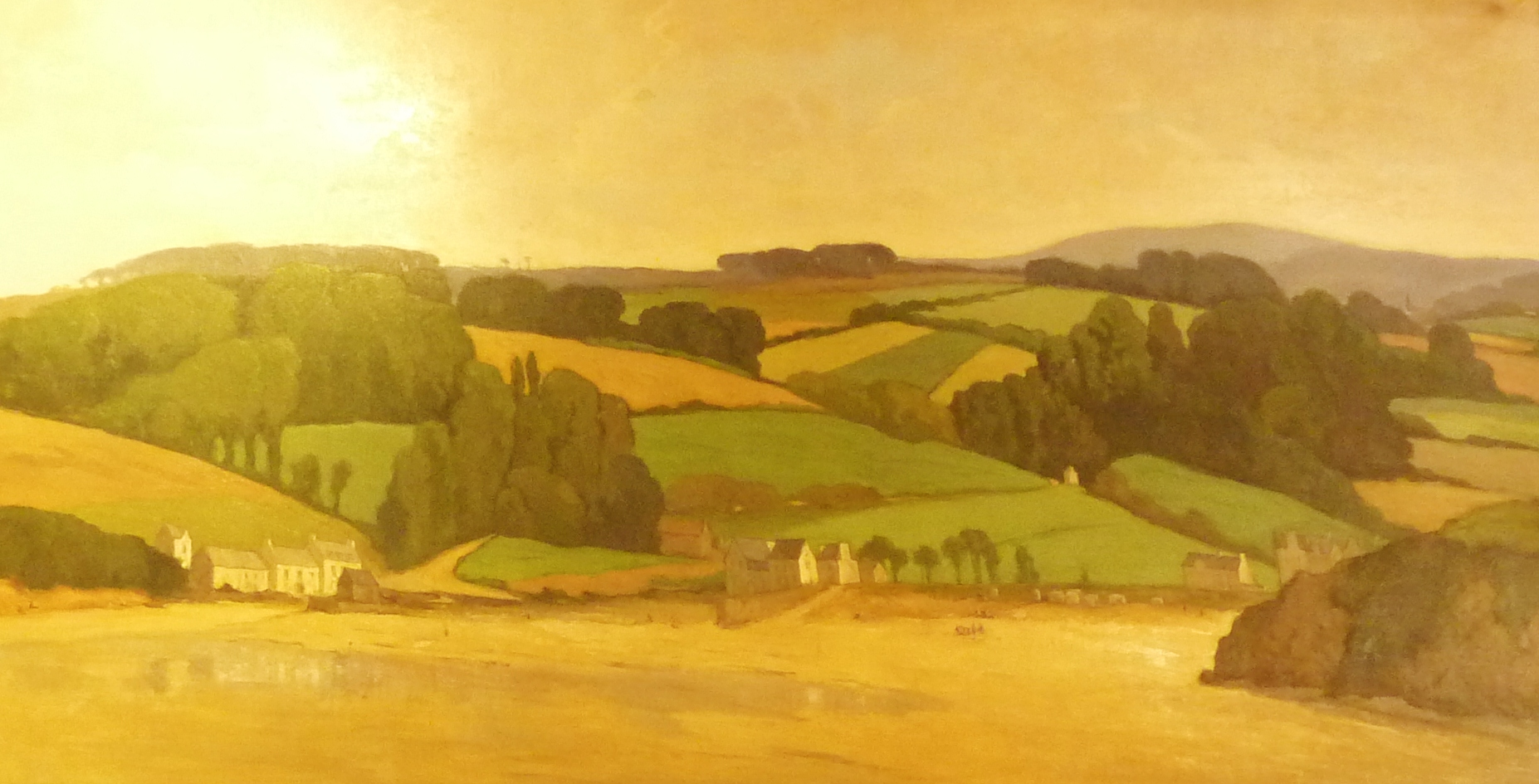
Maurice Le Scouëzec. La plage du Ris

== Works executed in Brittany ==
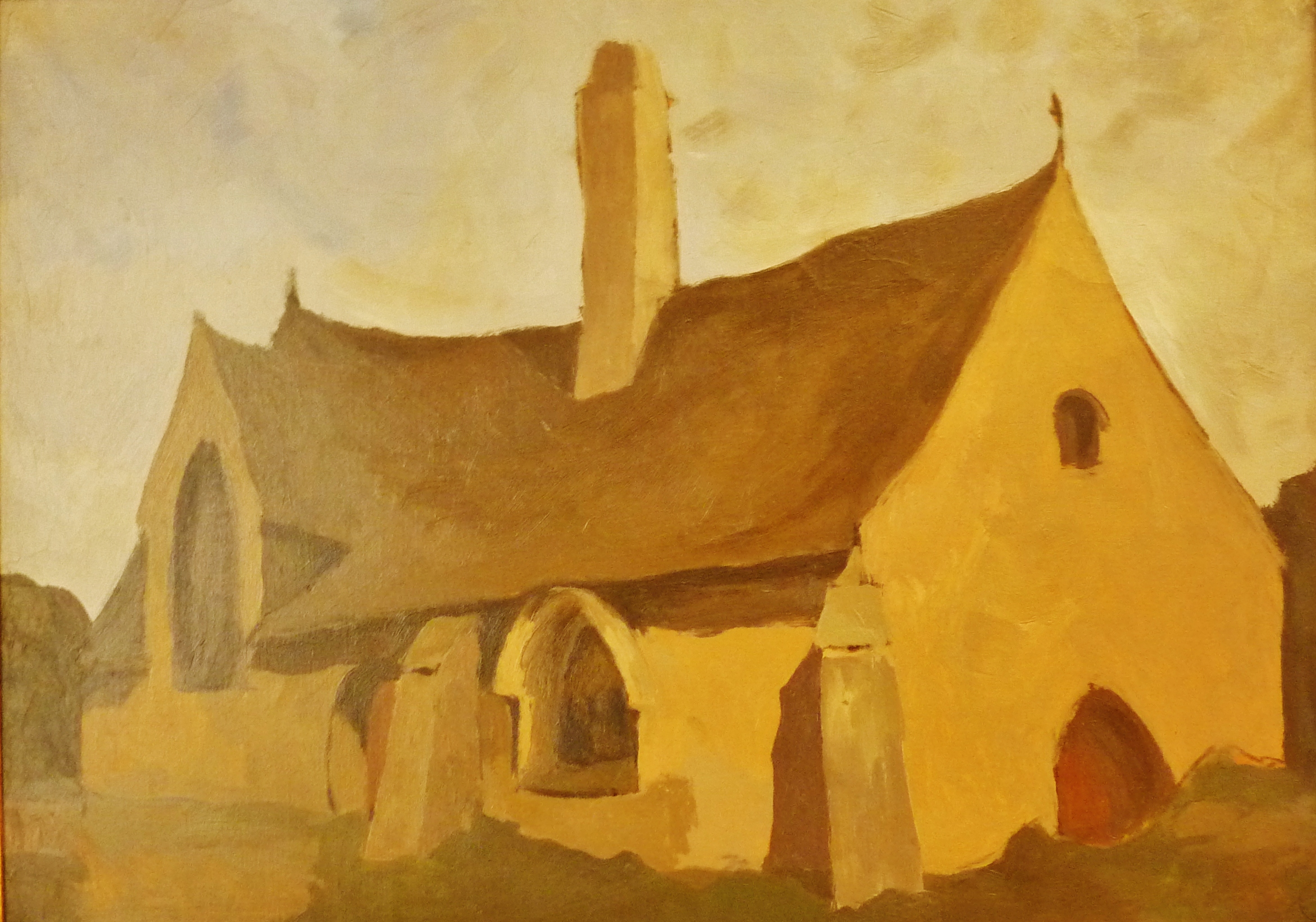
Maurice Le Scouëzec. The chapelle Notre-Dame-de-Bonne-Nouvelle. Douarnenez. Painted July 1934

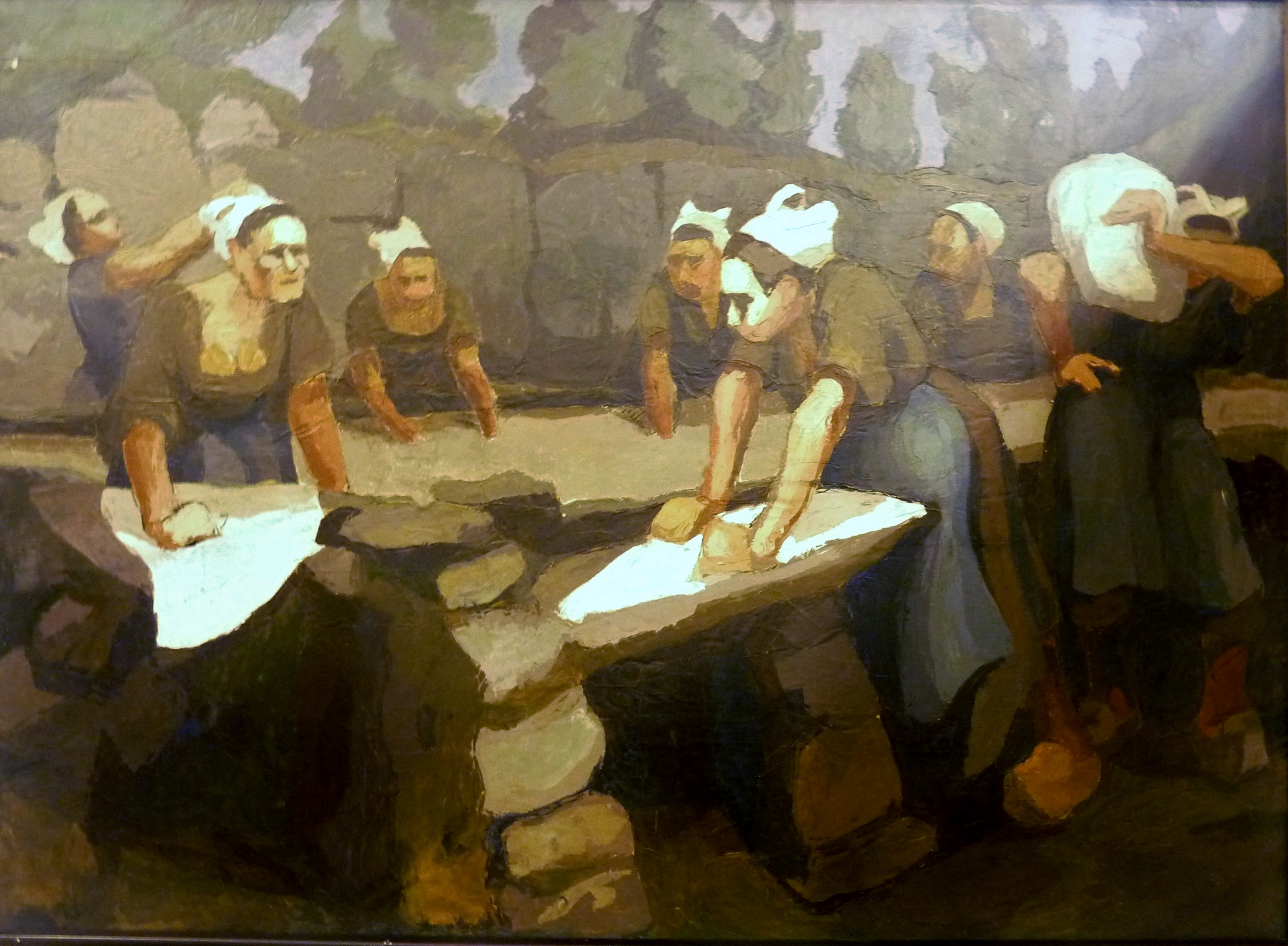
Maurice Le Scouëzec : Le lavoir de Commana. Women washing by Commana fountain

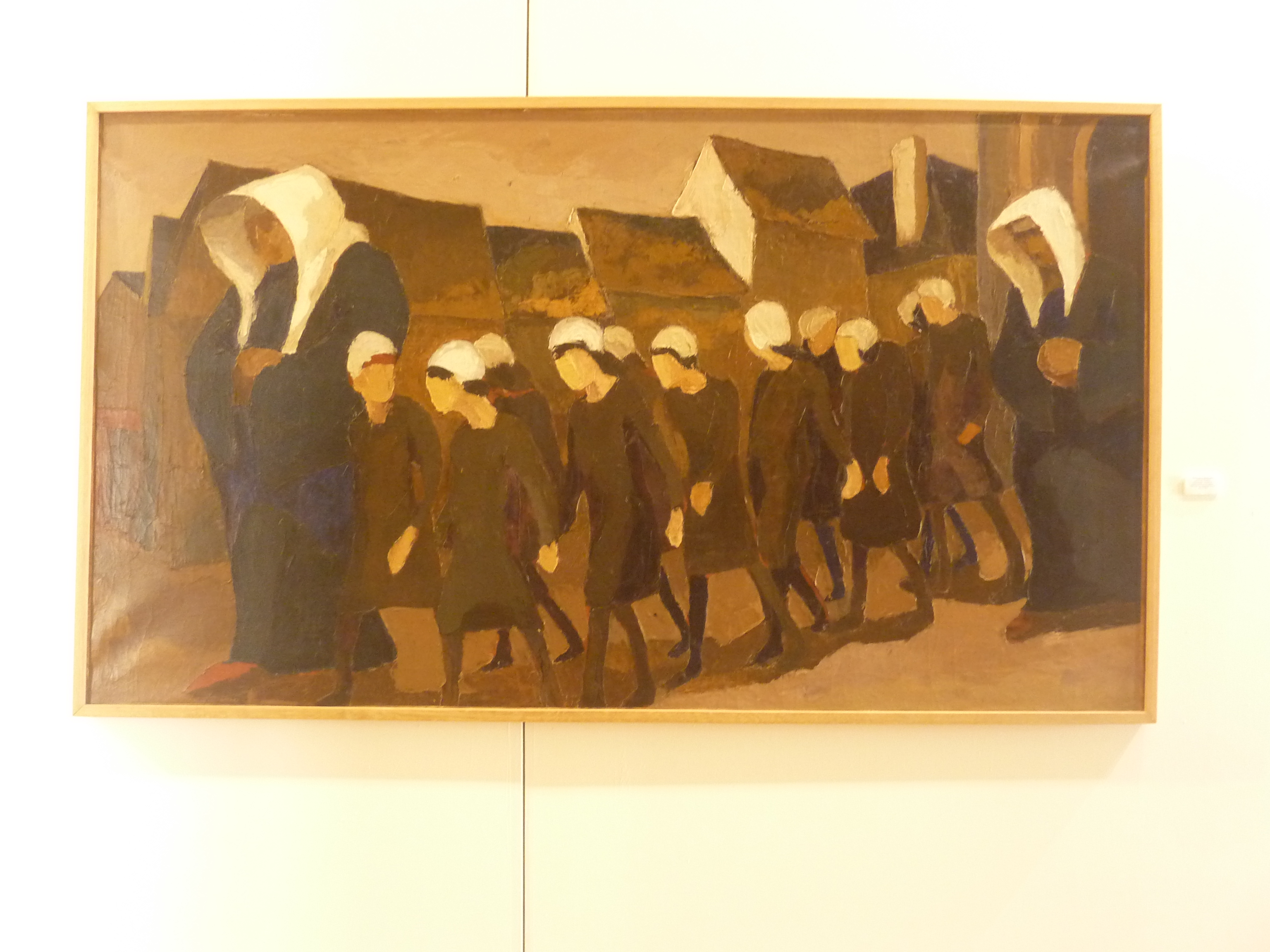
Maurice Le Scouëzec : Bonnes sœurs et pensionnaires. Sisters and pensioners in Landivisiau

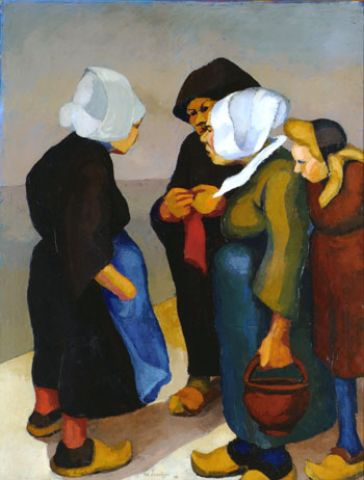
Maurice Le Scouëzec : Femmes du Cap Sizun en conversation. Study of women in conversation in Cap Sizun
