= Tristan Island =

Tidal island in Finistère, France

Coordinates: 48°06′06″N 4°20′14″W

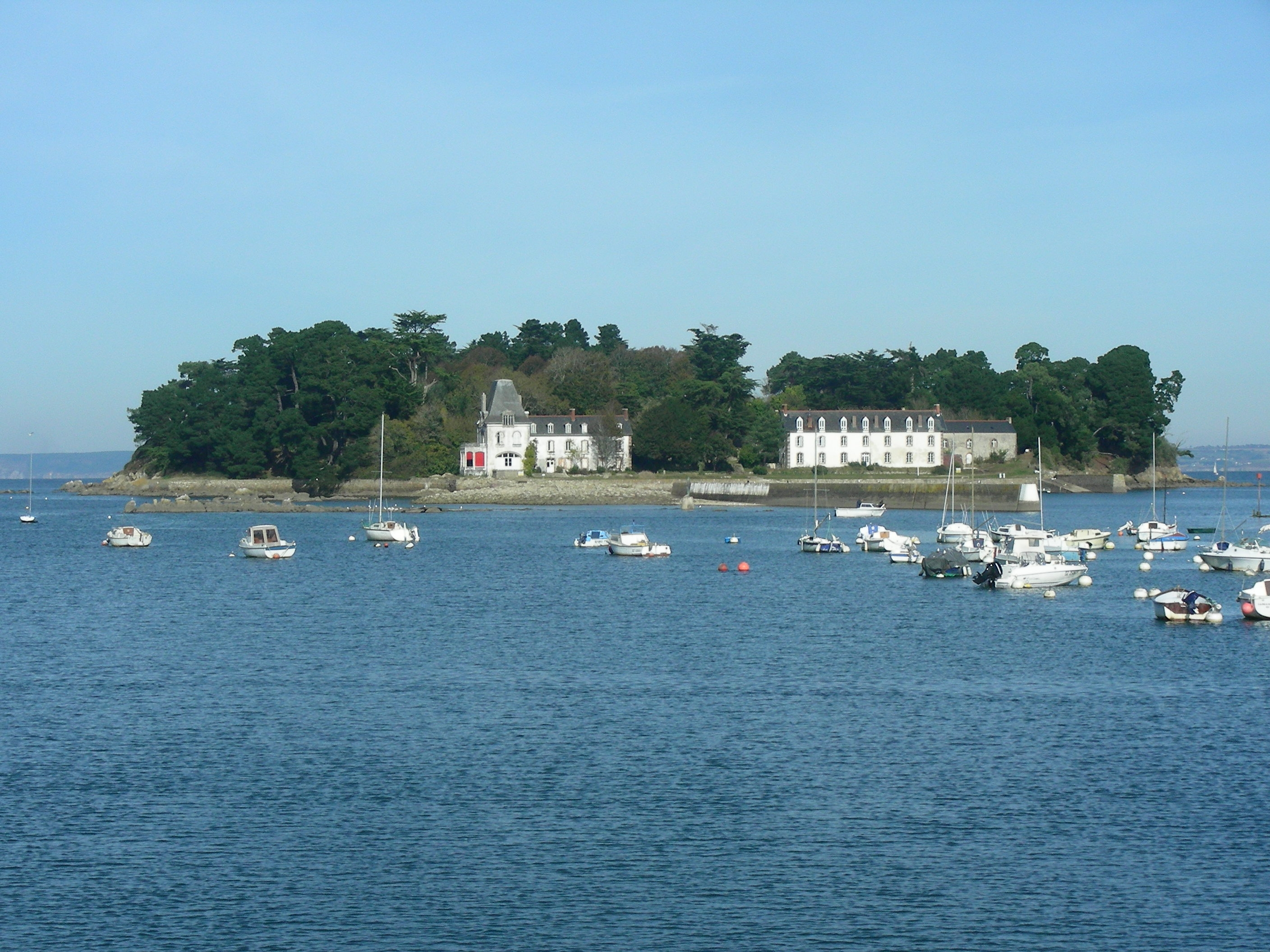
Tristan Island off Douarnenez, Brittany

Tristan Island or the Île Tristan is located at the mouth of the Pouldavid Estuary off the French port of Douarnenez in south-western Brittany. It is only about 450 m long and 250 m wide but despite its small size, it has a rich history. It is closely associated with Breton legends and the lost island of Ys. In the Middle Ages a priory was built there and the island was inhabited through much of the 20th century. In the 19th century, it became famous as the site of the first canning factory for sardines fished in the Bay of Douarnenez, the beginning of the sardine industry which was important for this region.

Now uninhabited, the island has become part of the national Parc naturel marin d'Iroise (Marine Park) established in 2007. It is accessible to tourists at low tide during spring tides most of the year, for a couple of hours at a time. A schedule is displayed on the mainland just across from the island, or can be obtained from the tourist office. At low tide, the island is connected to the mainland on the Douarnenez (or Eastern) side of the estuary.

== History ==
Tristan bears traces of civilization dating back to the Bronze Age. The written history of the island begins around 1118 when, according to a charter dated 1126, Robert de Locuvan, bishop of Cornouaille, donated the Island of St Tutuarn and the lands belonging to it to the Abbey of Marmoutier. As a result, a priory was built on the island. Douarnenez is Breton for the land of the island, as the priory that owned the site on which the town was later built. In the 14th century, the island became known as Tristan, after the Breton legend of Tristan and Iseult.

One of the most colourful figures associated with Tristan was Guy Éder de la Fontenelle, a rebel-bandit who took possession of the island in 1595. He stationed his garrison of some 700 soldiers there, and proceeded to plunder most of the surrounding towns and villages.

After the island was acquired by Gustave le Guillou de Penanros in 1854, in the southern part of the island, La Planiche built a sardine press. Le Guillou de Penanros developed the harbour and the sardine processing plant on the island, the first of its kind. The sardine industry developed as Douarnenez' principal economic activity in the late 19th and early 20th centuries. In 1911, the island was purchased by Jean Richepin, an author and playwright. He built the rotunda and the Chapelle des Aviateurs commemorating the first transatlantic flight from Europe to the United States by Dieudonné Costes and Maurice Bellonte in September 1930.

In 1995, the island was bought by Conservatoire du Littoral. It has carried out restoration work on the buildings and maintained the paths and gardens. The island is now maintained as part of the national Parc naturel marin d'Iroise (Marine Park) established in 2007.

== Landscape ==
The small island has rocky coasts and sea cliffs. From its years of habitation, an orchard, and a tropical garden were cultivated and are still maintained. Several footpaths reveal views of the bay, as well as Tréboul and Port Rhu on the mainland. At the northern end of the island, a lighthouse and the ruins of an old fort can be seen.

== Fauna and flora ==
Rabbits and lizards abound on the island, as do a wide variety of seabirds, especially cormorants, guillemots and herons. The vegetation is particularly rich in magnolias, medlars and quince trees. Cedars, oak and apple trees have been planted, as well as exotic varieties of bamboo, myrtle and mimosa. A large orchard is located in the southern part of the island, in addition to a tropical garden with a giant bamboo plantation, magnolia and fuchsia.

== Offices for the Marine Park ==
The recently renovated canning factory is now used as offices for staff working for the national Iroise Marine Park or Parc naturel marin d'Iroise created in 2007.

== Gallery ==
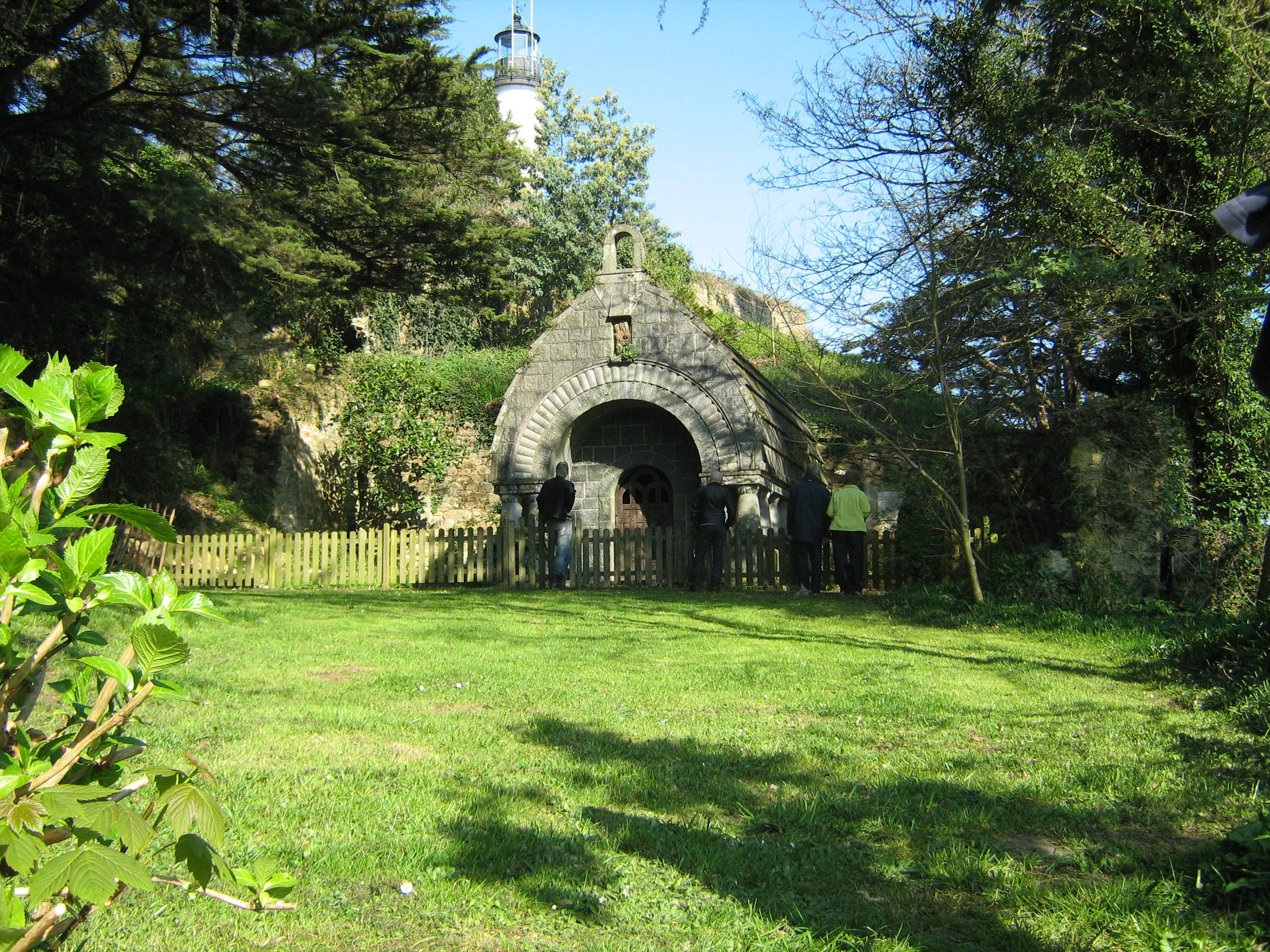
The Aviators' Chapel

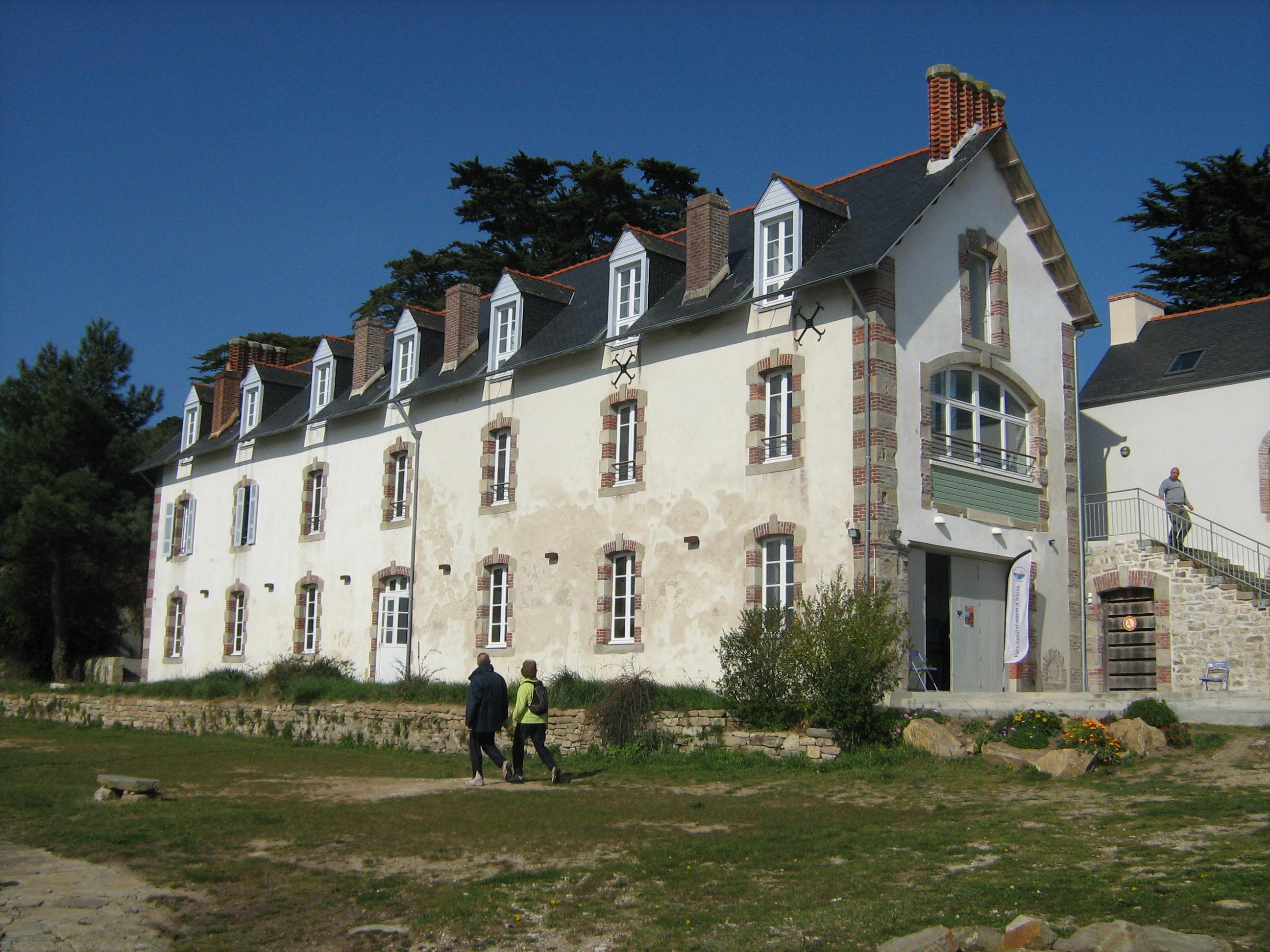
Former canning factory

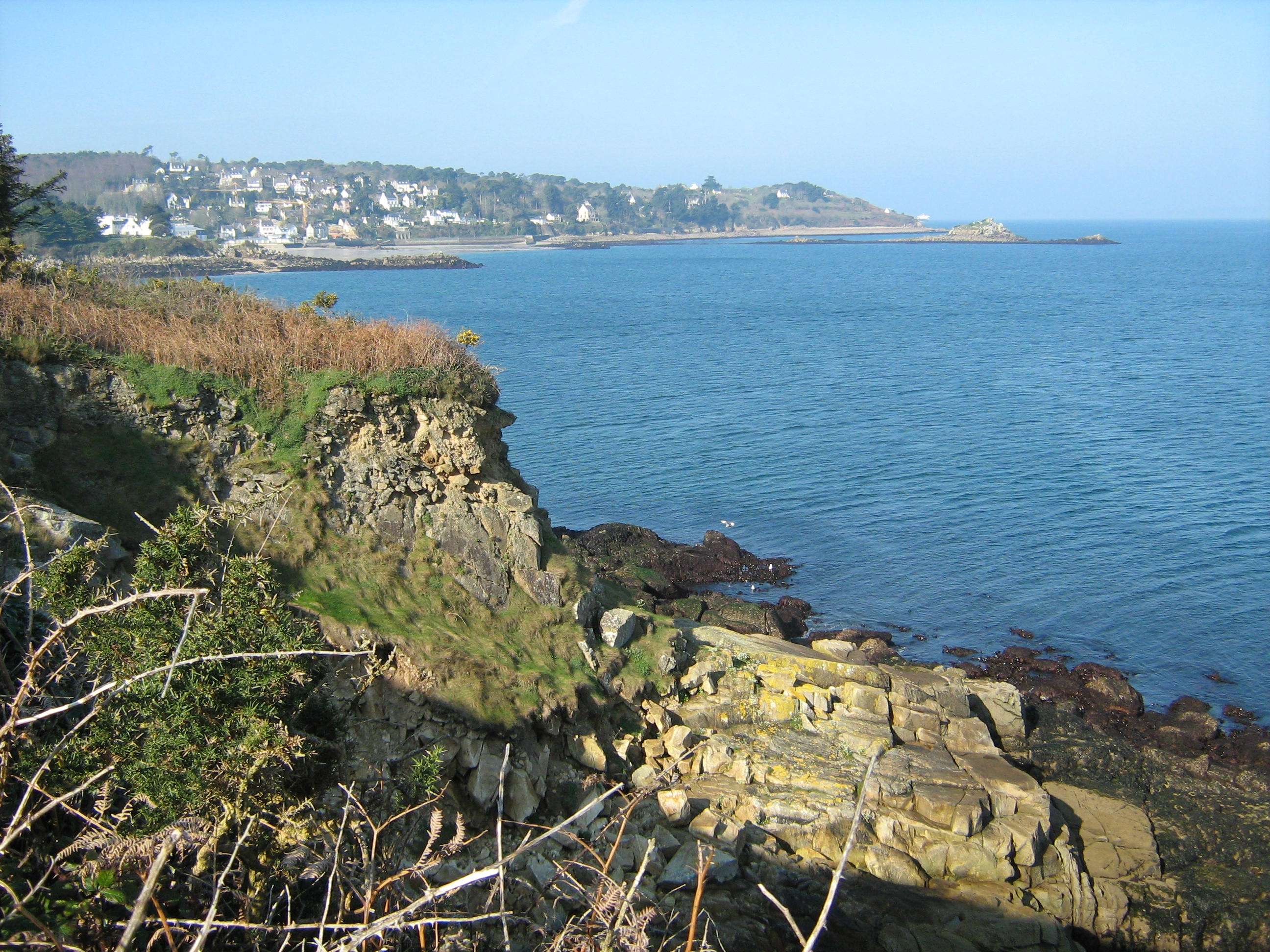
The north coast

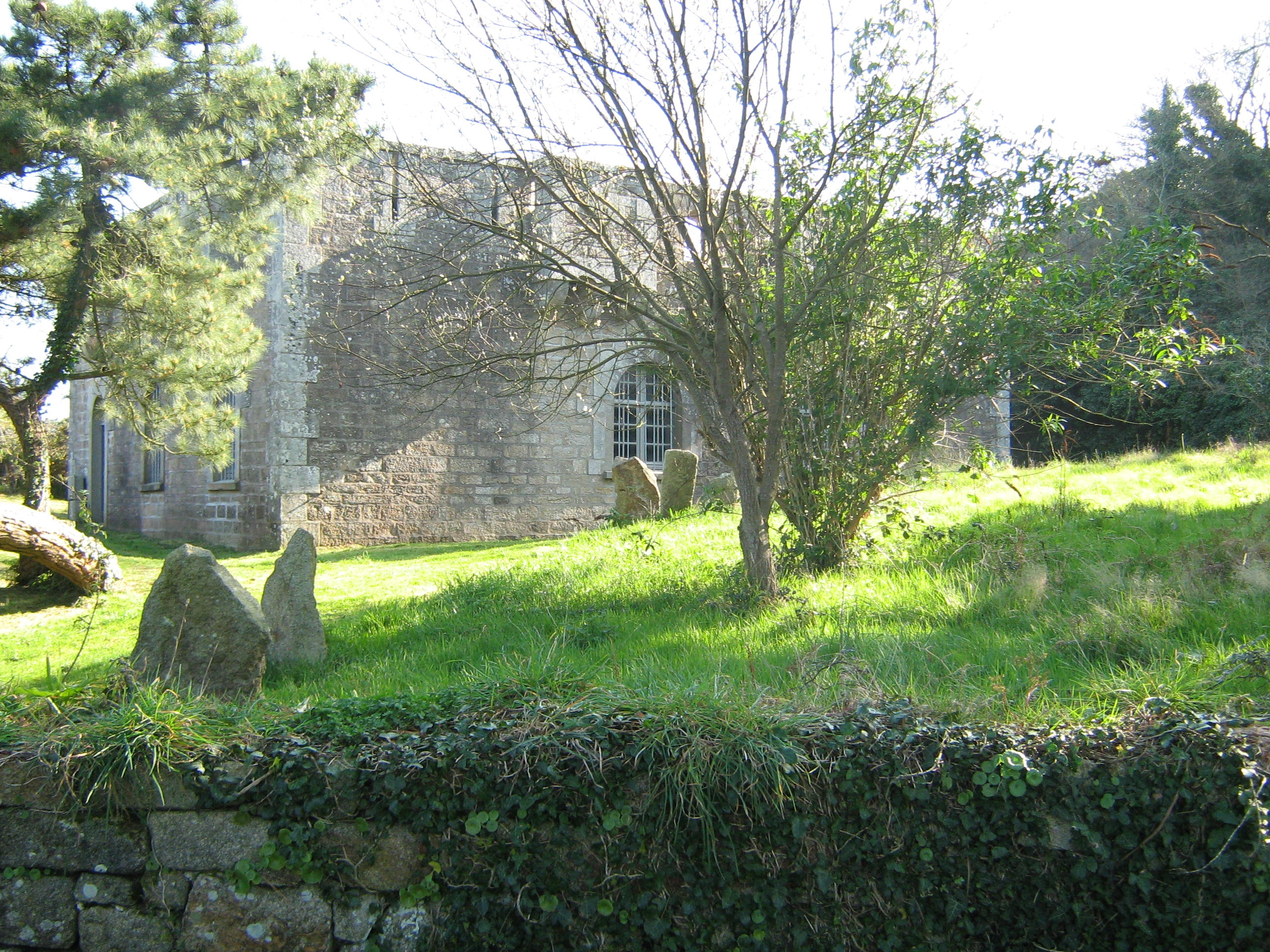
The fort
