= Sardine workers' strike =

Strikes in 1905 and 1924 in France

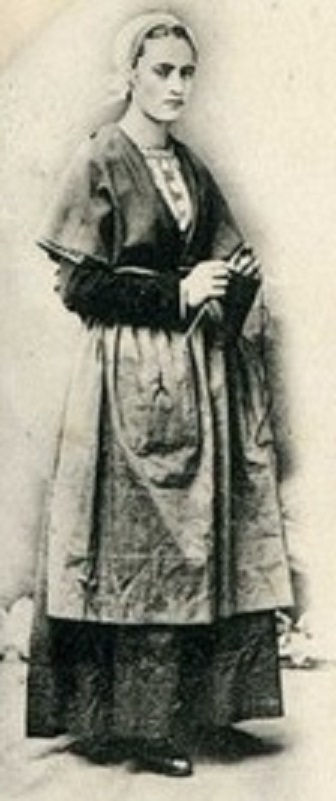
Women sardine worker from Douarnenez (Penn sardin)

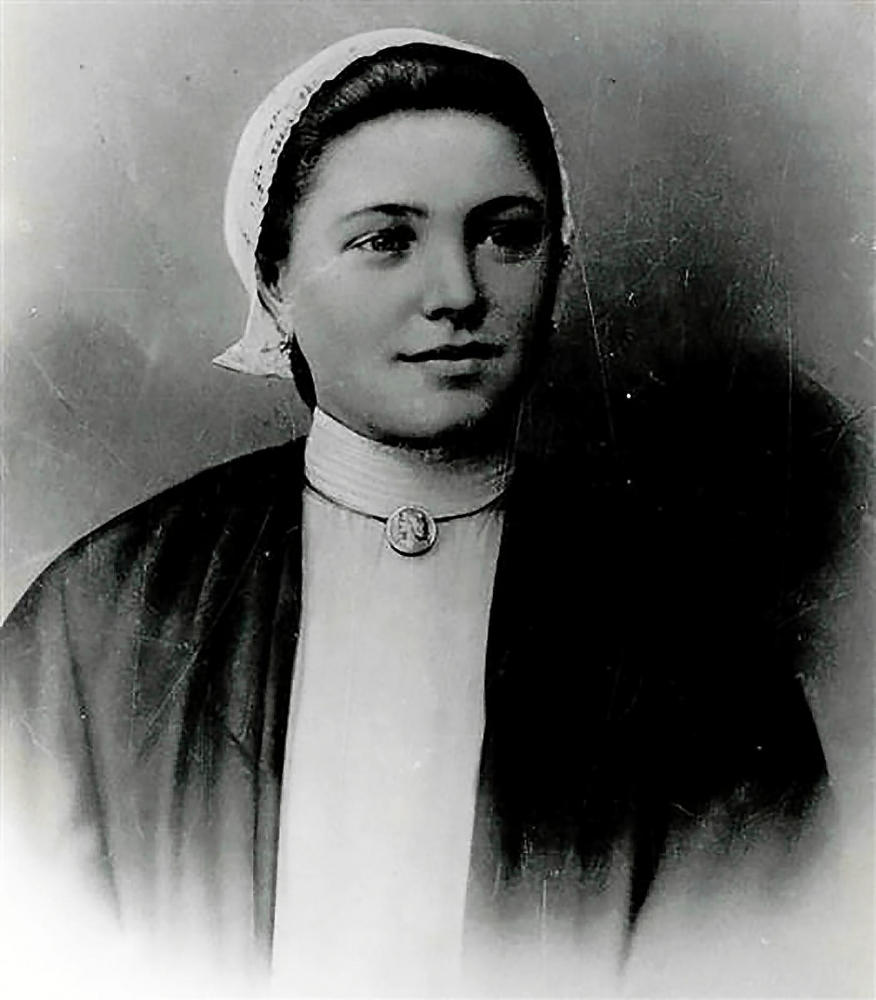
Josephine Pencalet

The sardine workers' strike was a series of strikes in 1905 and 1924 in Douarnenez and Concarneau in the French province of Brittany initiated by women workers in fish canneries to protest against the hardships of their tasks and to demand wage increases. This strike is considered as an important date of feminist struggles in France. The song titled Penn Sardin, written by Claude Michel and composed by Jean-Pierre Dovilliers celebrated their revolt.

== 1905 strike ==
There was a conflict between the fish cannery owners and the workers, who were almost exclusively women (the men were more often sailors). They could work up to 18 hours a day and were paid by the piece. They demanded to be paid by the hour. The strike began in Douarnenez but soon the women workers in the other towns on the coast stopped working. 1,500 women joined the Union of Sardine Women, whose president was Angelina Gonidec. A referendum was organized in which the women workers voted for the hourly wage by 944 to 21. They thus won their struggle.

== 1924 strike ==
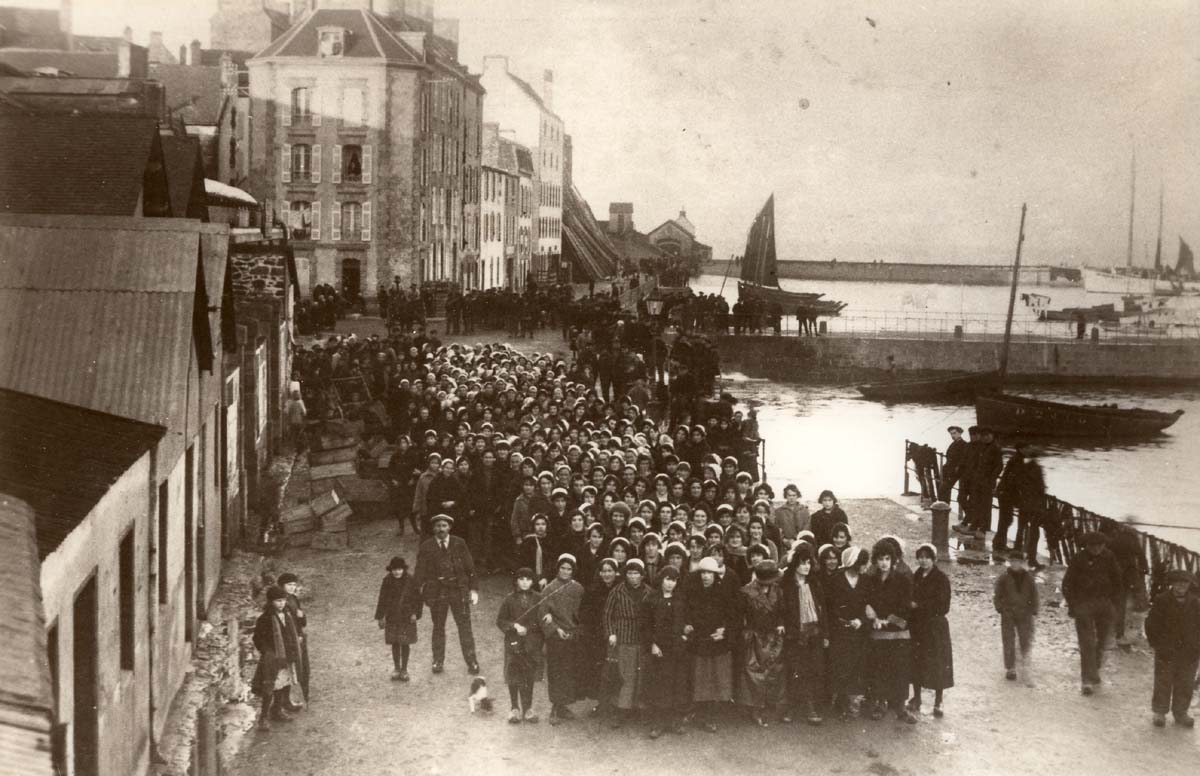
Women sardine worker's strike on November 20, 1924

Despite a law passed in 1919, women workers worked 10 hours a day, had no bonus for overtime and worked nights, which was supposedly illegal. In the winter of 1924, 2,100 people, including 600 women, demonstrated against their wage of 80 cents an hour and the fact that they had to go to the factory at any time day or night, when a shipment of sardines was delivered. The sardine workers sang some songs, and some were dismissed:

"Salute, happy rich / These poor in rags / Salute, they are the ones / Who earn your millions."

The Douarnenez sardine workers' strike in November 1924 to demand a wage increase was the beginning of a mobilization that lasted several months in the region. The strikers, mostly women, marched with the slogan "Pemp real a vo!" (Five reals it will be!). Joséphine Pencalet, who belonged to the Douarnenez metalworkers' union, took part in the strike. Her name in Breton, Penn kalet, meant "hothead" or "stubborn".

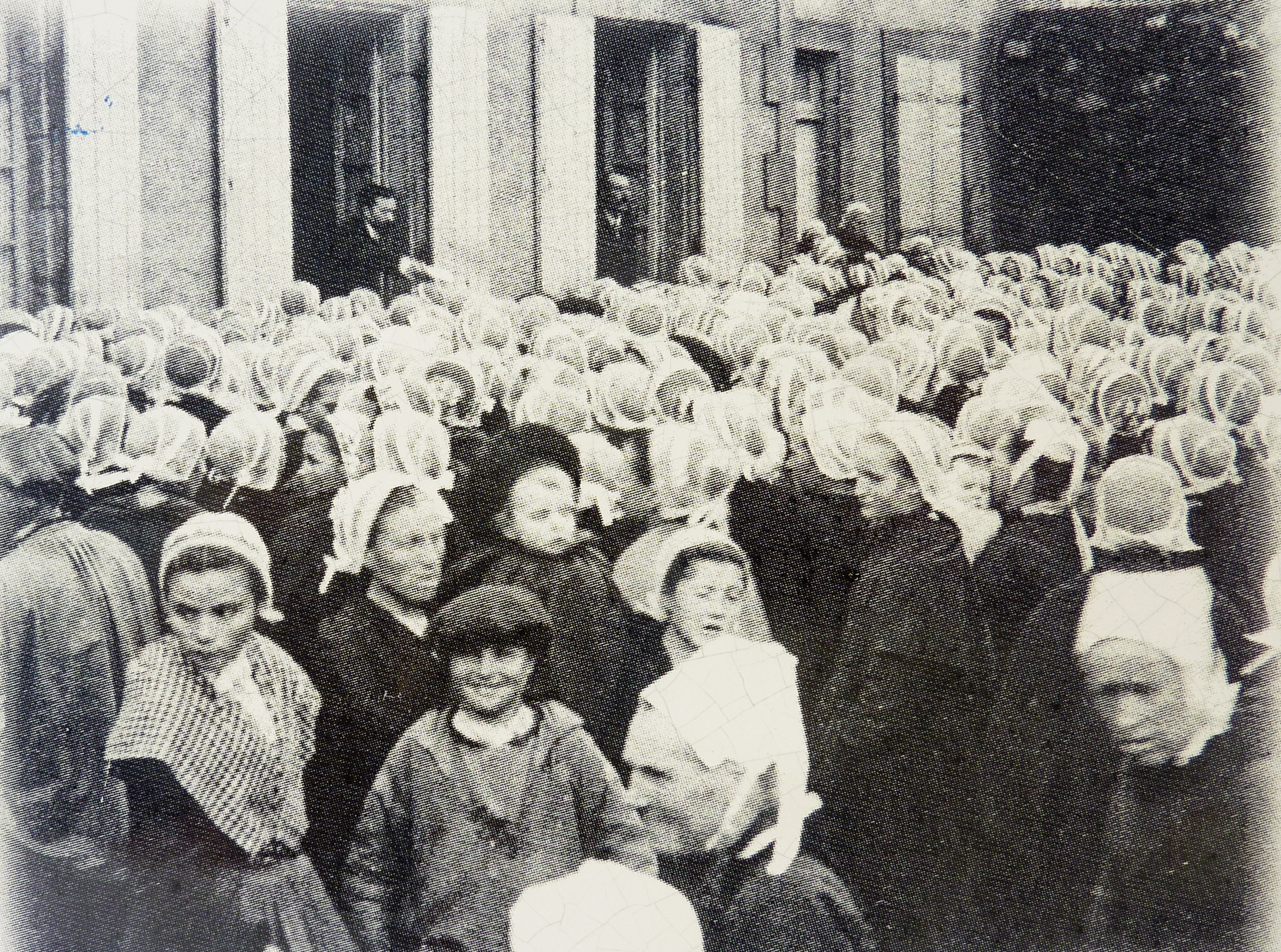
Food distribution at the townhall in 1903 during the strike.

The gendarmes repressed the strikers and called in strikebreakers, and the mayor, Daniel Le Flanchec, who had publicly supported the revolt, was suspended from office. The Minister of Labor proposed mediation but the struggle continued. The workers were joined by sailors and occupied the streets, the town was blocked, and the conflict was covered by the media.

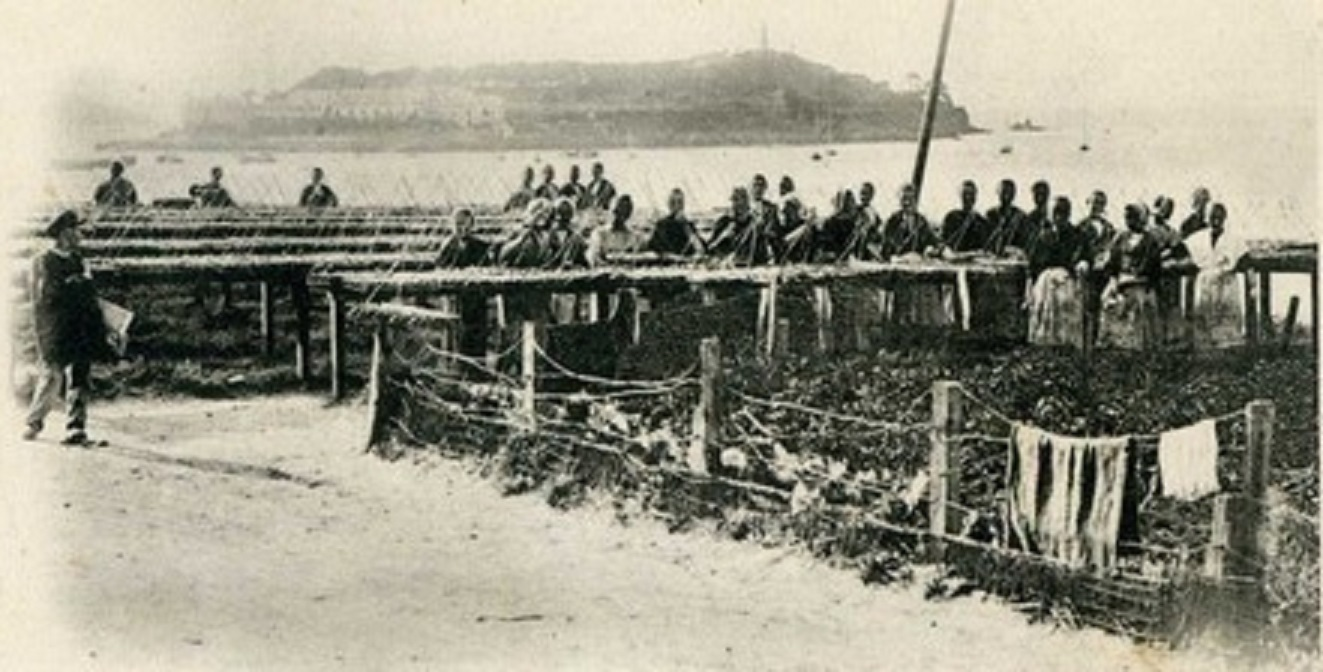
Women sardine workers at circa 1900.

On December 5, 1924, the newspaper L'Humanité reported on the charge against the demonstrators, carried out on behalf of the Ministry of the Interior, in an article entitled "Le sang ouvrier a coulé à Douarnenez" ("Workers' blood has flowed in Douarnenez"). The minutes of Le Flanchec's suspension from office were also published. The report of the suspension of Daniel Le Flanchec for rebellion provoked national media coverage of the strike in the daily newspapers, including Paris Soir and La Dépêche de l'Aube, which was moved by "the provocative intransigence of the sardine cannery owners".

On January 6, 1925, the factory owners gave in to the workers' demands.

== Posterity ==
A novel by Daniel Cario, Les coiffes rouges, published in 2014, retraces the events mixing fiction and reality.

In 2021, a Parisian demonstration sang a song written by Claude Michel to pay tribute to the Penn Sardins.

== Bibliography ==
- Martin, Anne-Denes (1994). Les ouvrières de la mer : Histoire des sardinières du littoral breton (in French). L'Harmattan. ISBN 978-2-7384-2300-9.
- Bugnon, Fanny (2016). Bretonnes, des identités au carrefour du genre, de la culture et du territoire. Joséphine Pencalet, une Penn Sardin à la mairie.
- Femmes de l'Ouest : avant-gardistes, ouvrières, artistes (in French). Ouest-France. 2021. ISBN 978-2-7373-8442-4. OCLC 1243897922.

== Filmography ==
- Penn sardines de Marc Rivière (2004)

== See also ==
- List of strikes
- Social movements in France
- Joséphine Pencalet
