= Douarnenez =

- Commune
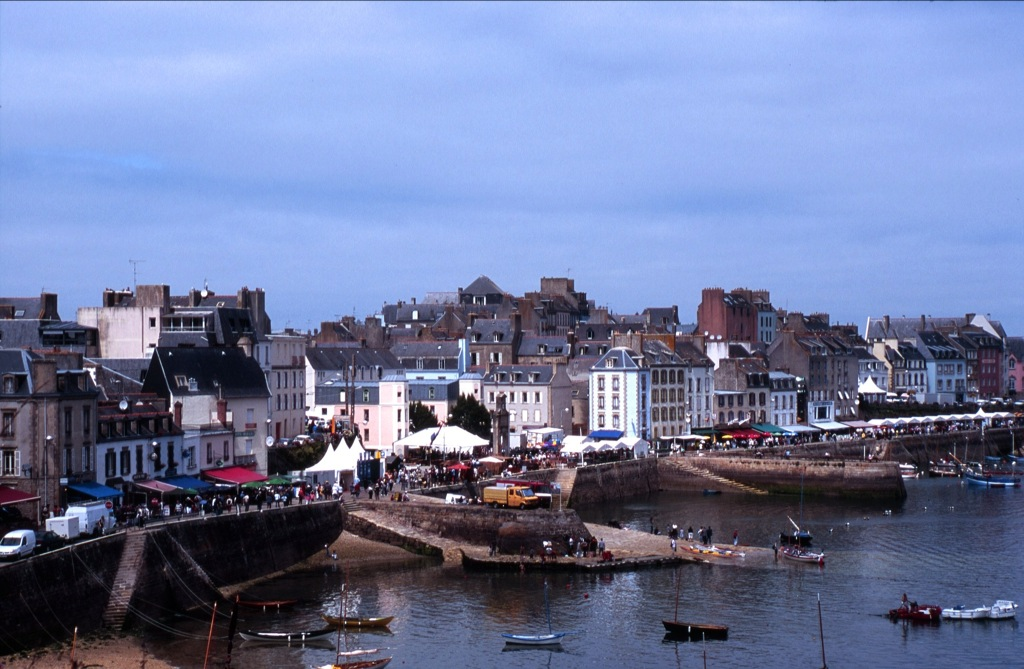
- Seafront of Douarnenez

- Coat of arms
- Location of Douarnenez
- Location within France Location within Brittany
- Coordinates: 48°05′34″N 4°19′45″W
- Country: France
- Region: Brittany
- Department: Finistère
- Arrondissement: Quimper
- Canton: Douarnenez
- Intercommunality: Douarnenez Communauté

Government
  - Mayor (2020–2026): Jocelyne Poitevin
- Area^{1}: 24.94 km^{2} (9.63 sq mi)
- Highest elevation: 85 m (279 ft)
- Lowest elevation: 0 m (0 ft)
- Population (2023): 14,068
  - Density: 564.1/km^{2} (1,461/sq mi)
- Time zone: UTC+01:00 (CET)
  - Summer (DST): UTC+02:00 (CEST)
- INSEE/Postal code: 29046 /29100
- ^{1} French Land Register data, which excludes lakes, ponds, glaciers > 1 km^{2} (0.386 sq mi or 247 acres) and river estuaries.

Douarnenez (Breton pronunciation: [duarˈnẽːnɛs], French: [dwaʁnəne]; meaning douar (land) an enez (the island) or land of the island), is a commune in the French department of Finistère, region of Brittany, northwestern France.

It is located at the mouth of the Pouldavid River, an estuary on the southern shore of Douarnenez Bay in the Atlantic Ocean, 25 kilometres (16 mi) north-west of Quimper. The population, 14,068 in 2023, has declined since the mid-20th century because of jobs lost from declines in the fishing industry. But it still has fish canning facilities (sardines and mackerel) although sardine fishing, for which the town became famous, has fallen off in recent years.

Douarnenez has a growing tourist industry, with numerous visitors attracted annually to its pleasant location and warm climate, and also because of its marinas, maritime museum, regattas and sandy beaches. The island of Tristan off Douarnenez can be reached by foot at low tide. It is linked to the legend of Tristan and Iseult from the times of King Arthur.

== History ==
The legendary city of Ys, of Breton folklore, is believed to lie beneath Douarnenez Bay. The port is also associated with the Arthurian medieval story of Tristan, lover of Iseult, for whom Tristan Island is named. The island was originally named St Tutuarn Island after the priory founded there in the 12th century. Douarnenez has several 16th and 17th-century churches, including the Church of Ploaré, which has a Gothic steeple (1548–86), and the chapels of Sainte-Croix, Sainte-Hélène, and Saint-Michel.

=== The commune ===
The written history of Douarnenez begins around 1118 when, according to a charter dated 1126, Robert de Locuvan, Bishop of Cornouaille, donated the Island of St Tutuarn and the lands belonging to it to the Abbey of Marmoutier. As a result, a priory was built on the island. In the 14th century, the island became known as Tristan.

The hamlet which grew up at today's Port of Rosmeur was originally part of the parish of Ploaré. It did not become a commune in its own right until 1790. In 1945, Douarnenez was expanded to include Ploaré, Pouldavid and Tréboul.

=== Fishing port ===
The fishing history of Douarnenez goes back at least to Gallo-Roman times when, as archeological finds demonstrate, fish were salted along the cliffs of Plomarc'h. In the late 18th century and the years before the French Revolution, sardines became the driving force for the local economy; the fishing industry was based on their harvest and, later, processing. By the beginning of the 20th century, there were huge fishing and canning activities at the port. The strikes in the 1920s in favour of better working conditions for the factory women or Penn Sardin were the main reason why Douarnenez became one of the first communist municipalities in France. Today, the canning trade continues, although most of the fish are brought in from other ports. Douarnenez is still a centre of boat building and repair work.

=== Railways ===
Douarnenez owes much of its prosperity and expansion to the construction of railways at the end of the 19th century, which provided services for passengers and goods, connecting the port to other markets. from the end of the nineteenth century. From the railway station at the centre of Tréboul, the SNCF operated a service to Quimper. The route began operations in 1884. In the mid-20th century, many former passengers had shifted to privately owned vehicles and passenger trains were discontinued in 1972. Goods traffic and shipping by rail continued until the railway was closed in 1988. The old line has been converted into an 18 km (11 mi) cycling and walking track, providing an excellent means of discovering the surrounding countryside.

The so-called Youtar was a small-gauge railway out of Dounarnenez to Audierne via Pont-Croix. Inaugurated in 1894, it was shut down in 1936 during the Great Depression. It was reopened during the Second World War and was finally closed after the war in 1946. The old track between Audierne and Pont-Croix has been converted into a footpath along the River Goyen.

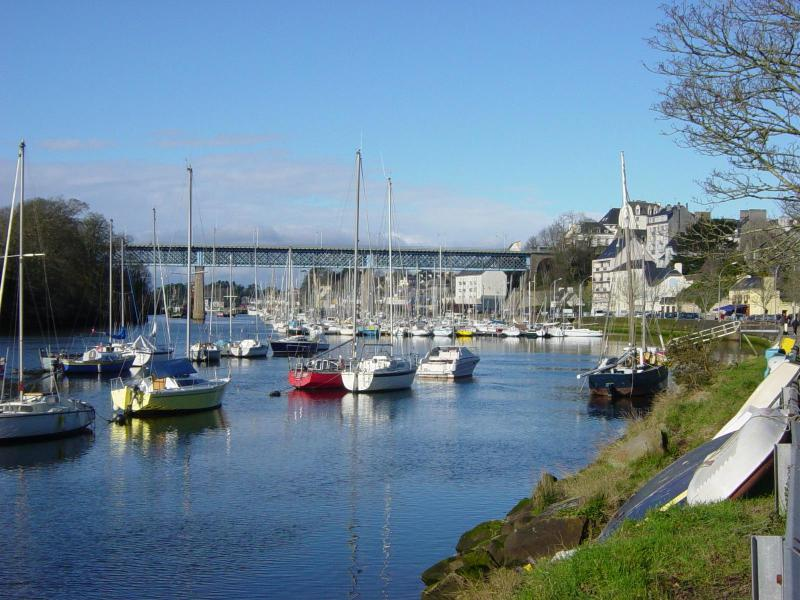
Douarnenez: Port Rhu

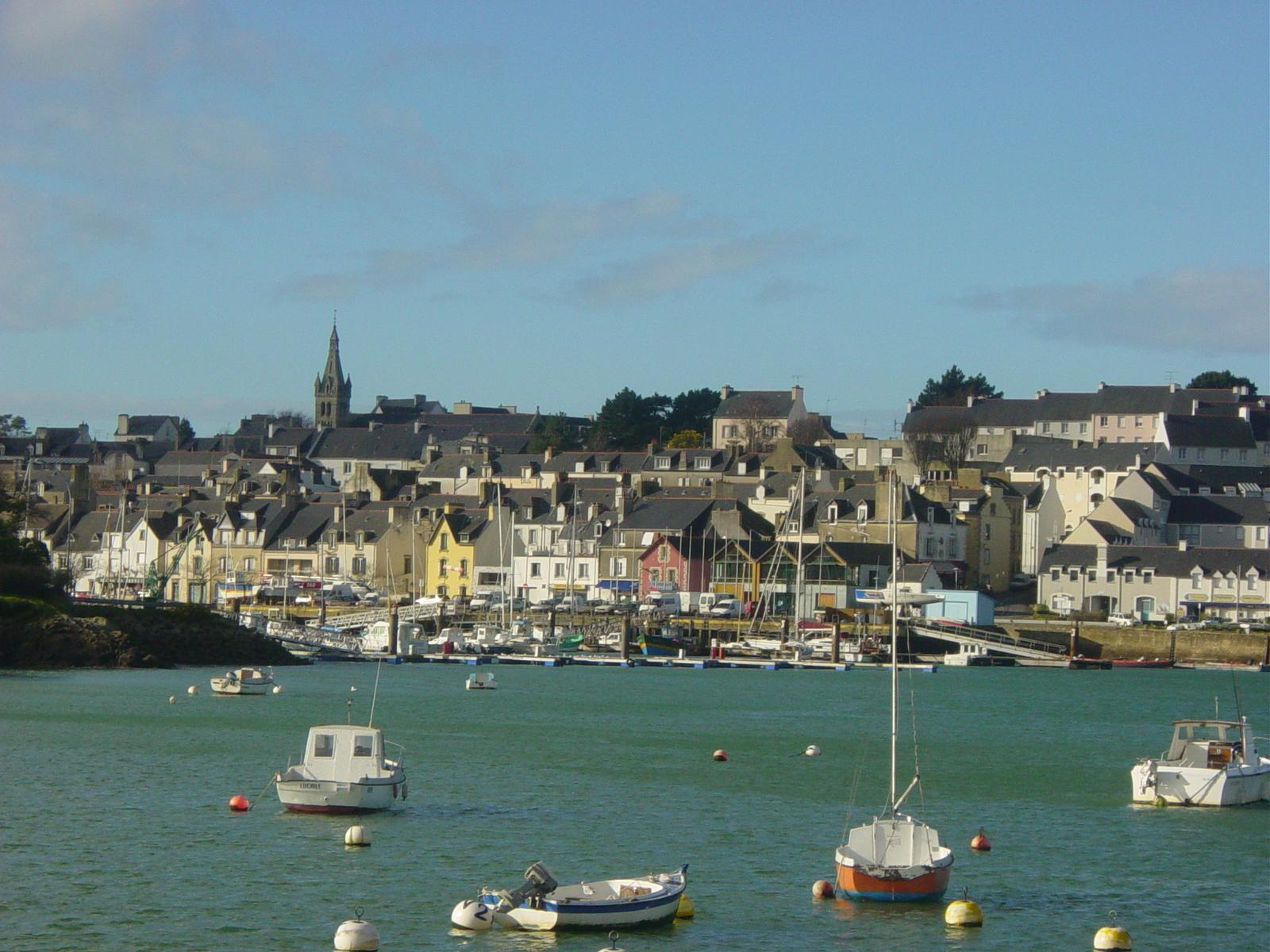
Douarnenez: The port of Tréboul seen from Douarnenez

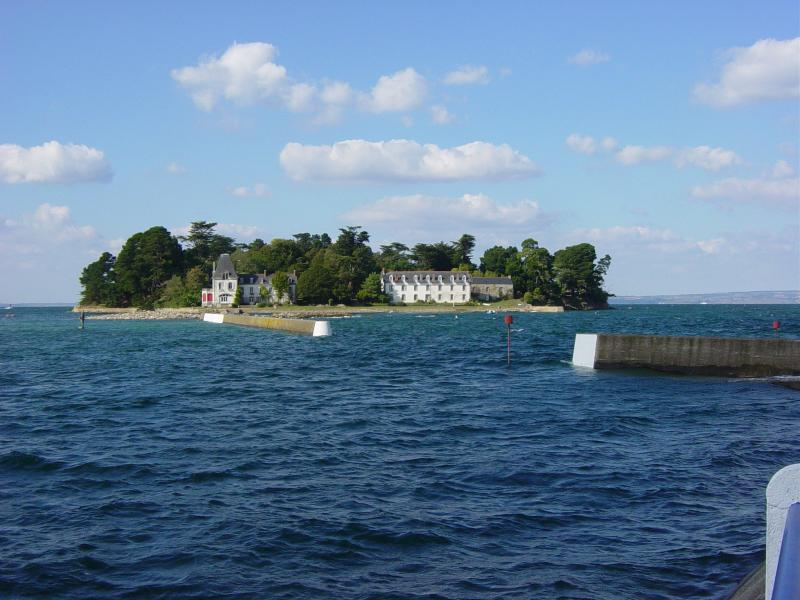
Douarnenez: Tristan Island at high tide

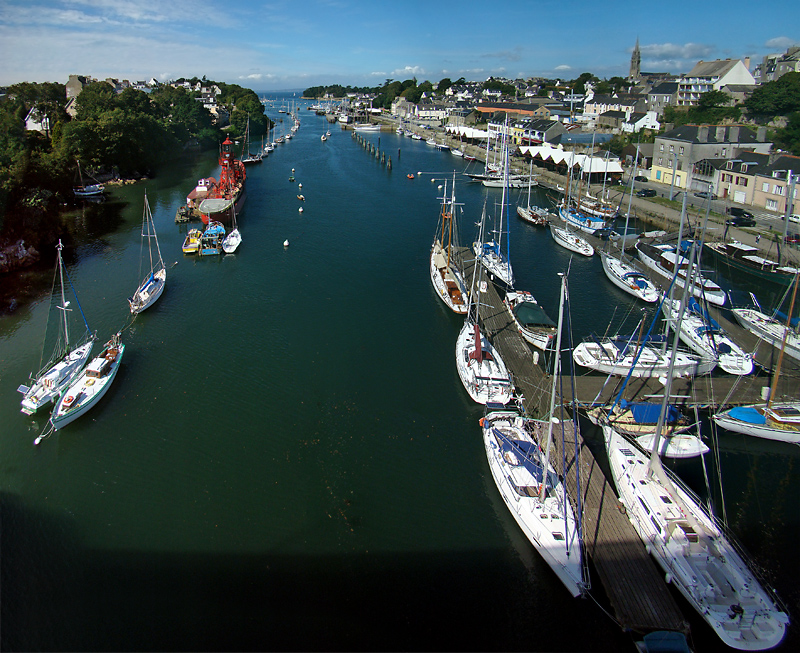
Port Rhu downstream

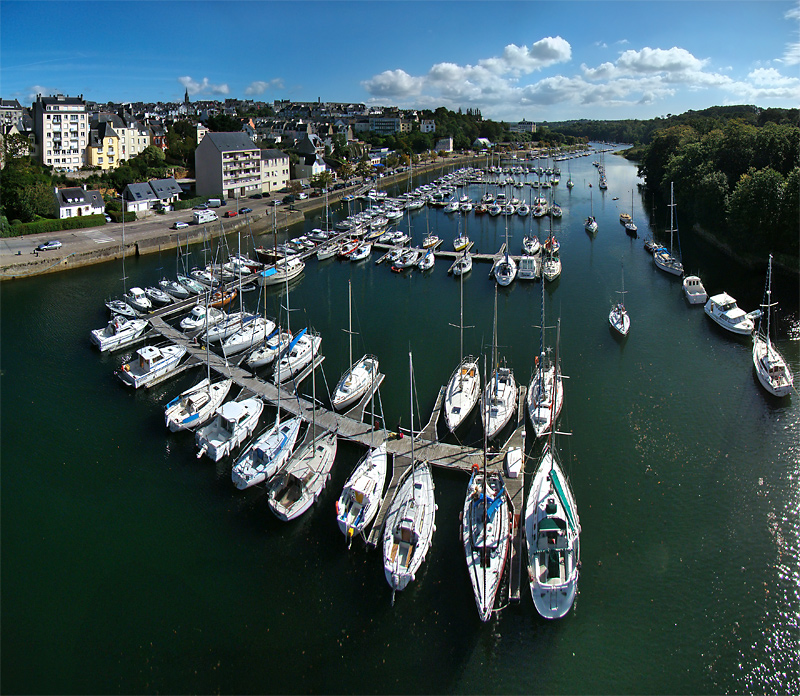
Port Rhu upstream

== Douarnenez today ==
The town centre is located at the top of a peninsula, with the Port of Rosmeur on the eastern side and Port Rhu to the west. The steep, narrow cobbled streets which climb up to the town from the harbors have changed little over the past century. They reveal a wide range of places of interest, including old chapels, the Halles or covered market at the town square, and traditional houses once inhabited by local fishermen.

The main square has the local market and is the center of other retail shopping, banking, and the local economy. A number of hotels and restaurants are located here as well as the post office and the tourist office. The road along the sea front at the Port of Rosmeur is lined with cafés and restaurants specialising in seafood.

The commercial harbour, including some of the fish processing and canning facilities, is at the northern end of the peninsula. Tristan Island is located off the peninsula but can be reached by foot at low tide. The Plage des Dames, a quiet sandy beach surrounded by rocky cliffs, is also in this area.

Port Rhu is noted for its boat cemetery and for its Port-Musée or Museum Port, an open-air museum where visitors may go on a number of fishing vessels dating to the early 20th century. It includes an innovative indoor museum with exhibits on the sea, its history and challenges.

Tréboul, situated on the other side of the estuary, also has a harbour for pleasure boats. The shore is lined with cafés and creperies. Les Sables blancs, a wide, sandy beach, is one of the main attractions.

== Population ==
Historical population

Year	Pop.	±% p.a.
1793	1,473	—
1800	1,708	+2.14%
1806	1,763	+0.53%
1821	1,800	+0.14%
1831	2,687	+4.09%
1836	3,303	+4.21%
1841	3,646	+2.00%
1846	3,952	+1.62%
1851	4,193	+1.19%
1856	4,470	+1.29%
1861	4,870	+1.73%
1866	5,434	+2.22%
1872	7,180	+4.75%
1876	8,637	+4.73%
1881	9,809	+2.58%
1886	10,985	+2.29%
1891	10,021	−1.82%
1896	11,465	+2.73%
1901	12,865	+2.33%

Year	Pop.	±% p.a.
1906	13,568	+1.07%
1911	13,753	+0.27%
1921	12,259	−1.14%
1926	11,290	−1.63%
1931	10,536	−1.37%
1936	10,556	+0.04%
1946	20,564	+6.90%
1954	20,089	−0.29%
1962	19,887	−0.13%
1968	19,705	−0.15%
1975	19,096	−0.45%
1982	17,653	−1.12%
1990	16,457	−0.87%
1999	15,827	−0.43%
2007	15,436	−0.31%
2012	14,747	−0.91%
2017	13,902	−1.17%
2023	14,068	+0.20%

Source: EHESS and INSEE (1968-2023)

=== Social Housing ===
Social housing in the municipality faces significant public safety issues.

== Sport and activities ==
Douarnenez: Old street down to the Port du Rosmeur

Douarnenez is a haven for water sports enthusiasts. In addition, there are facilities for horse-riding, tennis, walking, cycling, petanque and golf, all within a short distance of the town.

== Local culture and events ==
Since 1986, Douarnenez has organised maritime festivals every two years. These festivals attract all types of traditional sailing, with competitors from the four corners of the earth. In 2004, a record year, there were almost 2000 sailing ships, 17,000 sailors, and 30 participating countries.

Douarnenez also has a full programme of annual festivals and events featuring regattas, local folklore, cinema, carnévale processions, gastronomy, and sports. Details are available from the local tourist office. Tourism continues to prosper in Douarnenez. The 91,400 visitors in 2009 represented an increase of 2.87% since 2005.

Since the late 20th century, there has been a revival of Breton culture. The Bagad de Douarnenez is a Breton music association that performs with bagpipes and other local instruments. The Douarnenez film festival is partially inspired by the Breton revival, and specialises in films from minorities.

=== Bretons and their culture ===
The Breton people migrated to this area from south-west Britain in the 4th to 6th centuries, bringing their language and culture. Breton, a Brythonic language, bears great similarities to the Cornish and to Welsh languages of southwest England and Wales. Many of the traditional stories and myths also share a Breton-Cornish heritage. In the early 21st century, there are few, if any, native speakers of Breton who are not fully bilingual in French, although there were still several hundreds of thousands at the beginning of the 20th century.

With increasing interest in minorities and their languages in the later 20th century, several Breton-language schools have been established in Finistère. In addition, Breton-language radio and TV stations, bookshops, local theatre and music have been founded. It is estimated that more than 500,000 people are now fluent in Breton.

=== Gastronomy ===
One of the main attractions in Douarnenez are the numerous independent small restaurants and crêperies around the town. Most specialise in seafood, usually offering fish soup, shellfish, crab, lobster, prawns, sardines, mussels, and the catch of the day. Douarnenez's traditional buttery cake, kouign amann, has become famous throughout France and beyond. Breton cider can be drunk either alone or in a kir breton, a cocktail consisting of cider and cassis.

At the covered market or les Halles, open every morning, fresh fish and seafood are sold. In addition, a selection of crêpes or thin pancakes are prepared, which can be ordered with either sweet or savory fillings. The local canning factories continue to produce a range of sardines, which are on sale everywhere.

== Transport and access ==
Douarnenez is about five and a half hours' drive from Paris via Rennes, Lorient and Quimper. Quimper is the best served destination for rail connections to the region.

From Quimper, there are high-speed trains to Paris (4 hours) and to other parts of France.

Brest airport connects to Paris and Lyon, as well as to Birmingham and Southampton, England, and other destinations.

Douarnenez may be reached by sea although there are no regular passenger services. A ferry service operates between Plymouth and Roscoff, the latter less than two hours from Douarnenez by road. Visitors arriving by pleasure boat will find berthing facilities in Douarnenez.

Regular coach service is available between Quimper and Douarnenez, taking about 35 minutes. Douarnenez has a number of municipal bus routes.

== Sights ==
One way to visit Douarnenez is to follow the Sardine Route or Chemin de la Sardine. The latter is a guided walk through the town, where 19 panels (in French, English and Breton) at key points along the route explain its history and special connection with the sardine trade.

In the summer, boat trips from Douarnenez travel around the bay with views of the sea caves on the north coast. Visitors to the caves can take one of the trips from Crozon by small boats that take tourists inside the caves.

At low tide, it is possible to walk across to Tristan Island which is now increasingly open to the public. The island has a harbour, a lighthouse, a walled garden, an orchard and an art gallery.

=== Surrounding area ===
The coast, stretching westwards to the Pointe du Raz and northwards to Crozon, is best visited on foot. Signposted footpaths lead visitors to all the rocky inlets and headlands, providing sea views. A number of long, sandy beaches are located to the east of Douarnenez. A particularly popular spot is Locronan, a few kilometres from Douarnenez, which is a well preserved Breton village with a number of monuments. In addition, the historic city of Quimper has historic buildings, narrow streets, porcelain factories, and the bustle of the city centre.

== Climate ==
Douarnenez enjoys a mild, if rather wet climate. The prevailing winds are from the south west, bringing fairly frequent periods of light rain, particularly in the winter months. The summer months are much drier, with temperatures averaging about 20 °C (68 °F) and sometimes climbing above 30 °C (86 °F). It rarely freezes in winter and there is practically no snow. As a result, palm trees have been cultivated in parks and gardens. In February and March, mimosa trees are in full bloom.

There are strong tides, particularly in the spring. Winds blowing in from the Atlantic occasionally reach gale force. Details, including past averages, are available from Météo France.

== Sister cities ==
- Falmouth, Cornwall, United Kingdom
- Murmansk, Russia

== Breton language ==
Adhesion to the Ya d'ar brezhoneg charter was voted by the City Council on 22 December 2004. On 8 February 2008 the municipality received the label of "level 2" of the charter.

At the start of the 2017 school year, 134 pupils were enrolled in the public bilingual stream (11.4% of children in the municipality enrolled in primary school).

== Notable residents and natives ==
- Ronan Pensec, born 1963, a professional cyclist from 1985 to 1997
- Yvon Le Bot, sociologist
- Yoann Gourcuff, born 11 July 1986 in Ploemeur, footballer
- Nolwenn Korbell, born 1968, singer-songwriter, actress
- Romain Danzé, born 1986, footballer

=== Historical citizens ===
- René Laennec (1781–1826), doctor and inventor of the stethoscope
- Georges Perros (1923–78), writer

== See also ==
- Communes of the Finistère department
- Maurice Le Scouëzec
- Lionel Floch
- Sardine workers' strike
