= Guy Wilthew =

English painter

Guy Wilthew, real name Gerard Herbert Guy Smith, is an English artist born on 31 January 1876 in Shortland Grove, Beckenham and died in 1920 in Le Faouët.

== Biography ==
Guy Wilthew settled in Faouët, a small village which attracted many artists to it. Here he married the daughter of a local artist Louis Le Leuxhe. Her name was Marguerite. They had three children, Guy, Armelle and Marguerite and eventually moved to Vannes. Wilthew was the great-grandfather of Louise Bourgoin.

== Works ==
- "Le bénitier de la chapelle Saint-Fiacre This study of two Bretons standing by a stoup was painted in 1898. It is held by the Musée du Faouët.

== Gallery ==
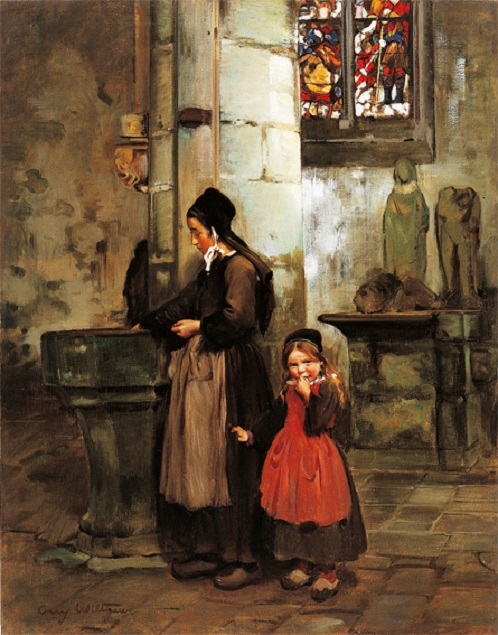
Guy Wilthew's "Le bénitier de la chapelle Saint-Fiacre". Painted around 1913, The painting is in the Musée du Faouët

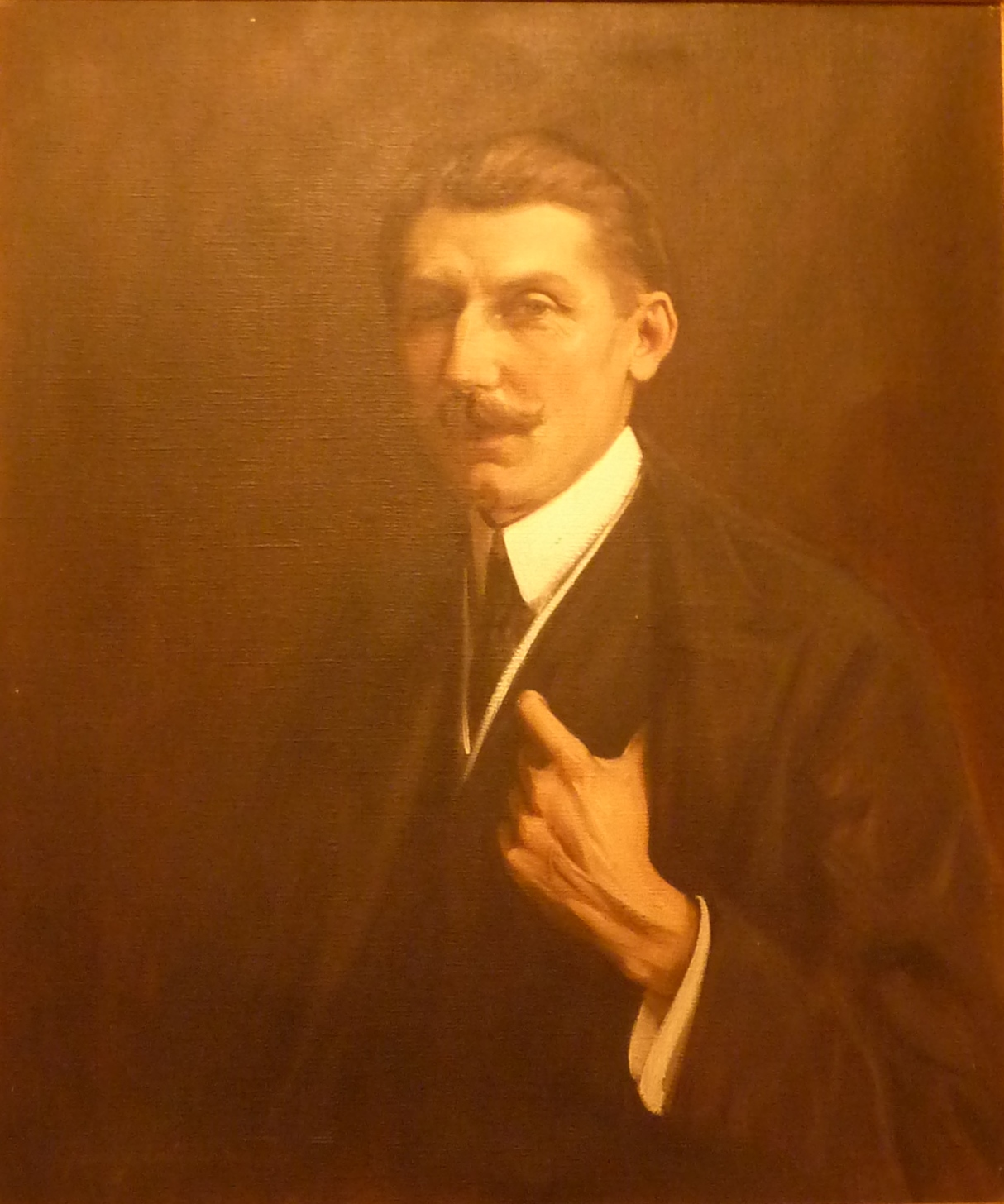
Guy Wilthew's Portrait de Victor Robic. Held in the Musée du Faouët.
