= Lanrivain =

Lanrivain Larruen
- Commune
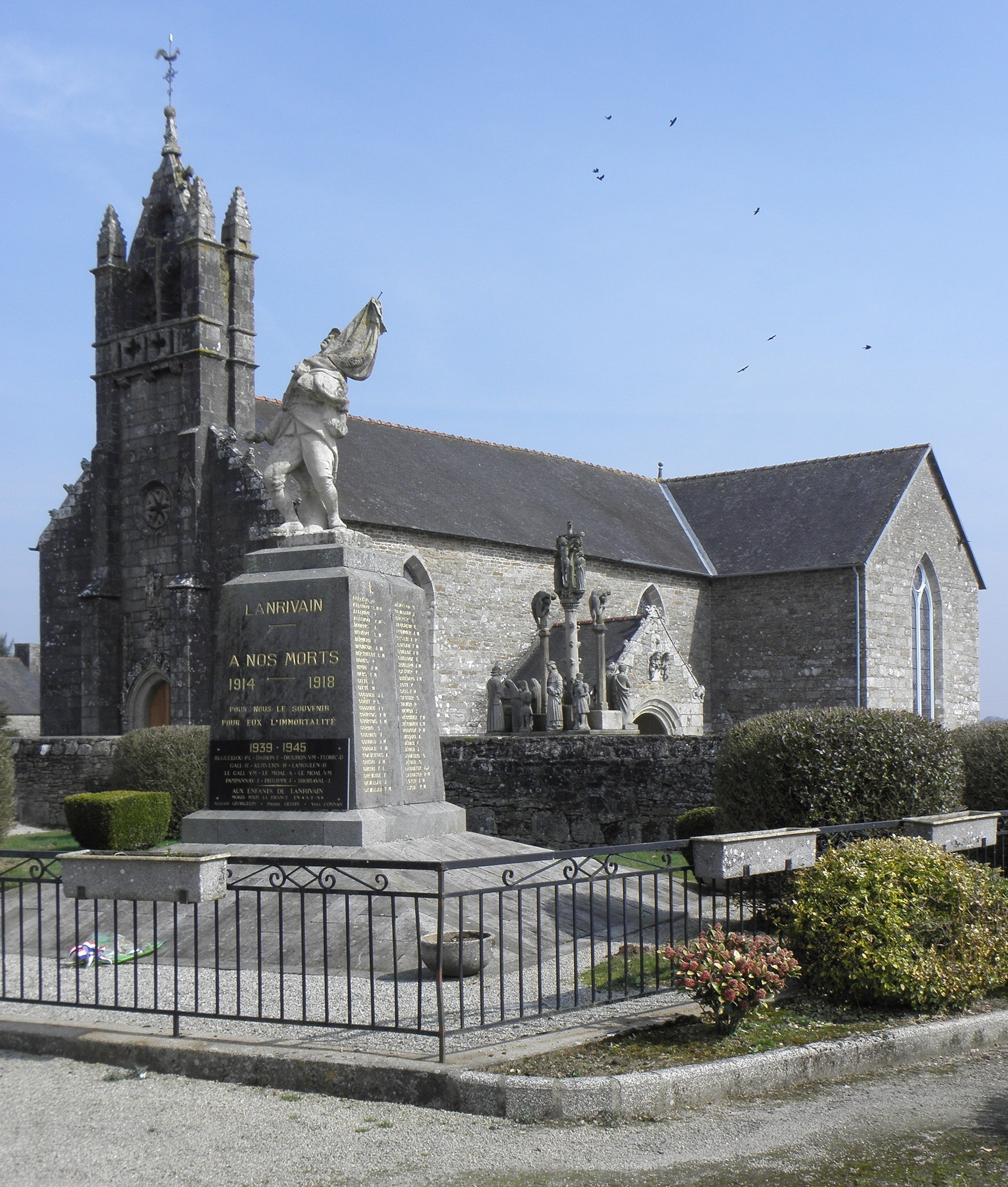
- The church of Saint-Grégoire
- Location of Lanrivain
- Location within France Location within Brittany
- Coordinates: 48°20′51″N 3°12′46″W
- Country: France
- Region: Brittany
- Department: Côtes-d'Armor
- Arrondissement: Guingamp
- Canton: Rostrenen
- Intercommunality: Kreiz-Breizh

Government
  - Mayor (2020–2026): Philippe Le Joncour
- Area^{1}: 36.74 km^{2} (14.19 sq mi)
- Highest elevation: 281 m (922 ft)
- Lowest elevation: 160 m (520 ft)
- Population (2023): 464
  - Density: 12.6/km^{2} (32.7/sq mi)
- Time zone: UTC+01:00 (CET)
  - Summer (DST): UTC+02:00 (CEST)
- INSEE/Postal code: 22115 /22480
- ^{1} French Land Register data, which excludes lakes, ponds, glaciers > 1 km^{2} (0.386 sq mi or 247 acres) and river estuaries.

Lanrivain (French pronunciation: [lɑ̃ʁivɛ̃]; Breton: Larruen) is a commune in the Côtes-d'Armor department of Brittany in northwestern France.

== Population ==
Historical population
Year	Pop.	±% p.a.
1968	882	—
1975	761	−2.09%
1982	638	−2.49%
1990	510	−2.76%
1999	524	+0.30%
2007	561	+0.86%
2012	538	−0.83%
2017	456	−3.25%
2023	464	+0.29%
Source: INSEE

Inhabitants of Lanrivain are called lanrivanais in French.

== See also ==
- Communes of the Côtes-d'Armor department
- List of the works of the Maître de Lanrivain
