= Gurunhuel =

Gurunhuel Gurunuhel
- Commune
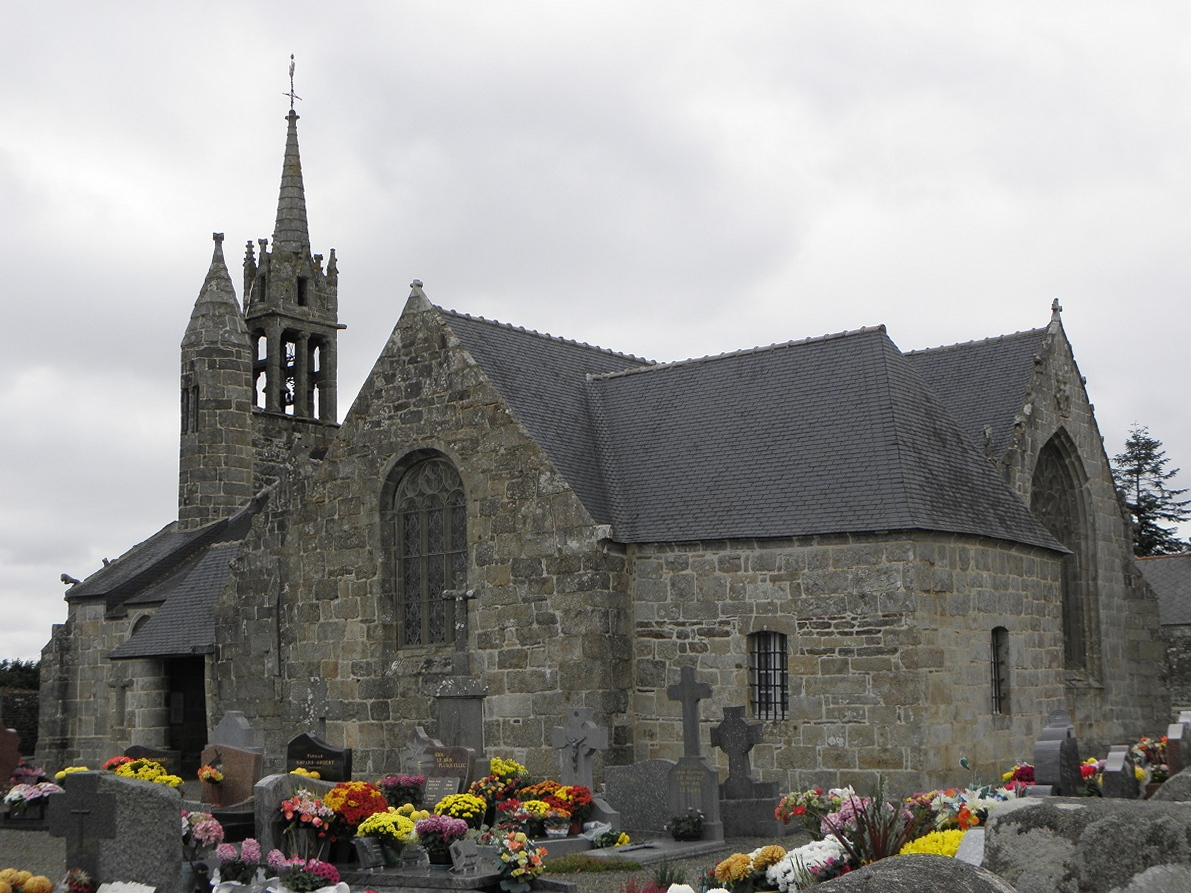
- The church of Notre-Dame, in Gurunhuel
- Location of Gurunhuel
- Location within France Location within Brittany
- Coordinates: 48°31′01″N 3°17′57″W
- Country: France
- Region: Brittany
- Department: Côtes-d'Armor
- Arrondissement: Guingamp
- Canton: Callac
- Intercommunality: Guingamp-Paimpol Agglomération

Government
  - Mayor (2020–2026): Paul Rolland
- Area^{1}: 19.58 km^{2} (7.56 sq mi)
- Highest elevation: 302 m (991 ft)
- Lowest elevation: 159 m (522 ft)
- Population (2023): 409
  - Density: 20.9/km^{2} (54.1/sq mi)
- Time zone: UTC+01:00 (CET)
  - Summer (DST): UTC+02:00 (CEST)
- INSEE/Postal code: 22072 /22390
- ^{1} French Land Register data, which excludes lakes, ponds, glaciers > 1 km^{2} (0.386 sq mi or 247 acres) and river estuaries.

Gurunhuel (French pronunciation: [ɡyʁynɥɛl]; Breton: Gurunuhel) is a commune in the Côtes-d'Armor department of Brittany in northwestern France.

== Population ==
Historical population
Year	Pop.	±% p.a.
1968	591	—
1975	508	−2.14%
1982	440	−2.03%
1990	404	−1.06%
1999	383	−0.59%
2007	397	+0.45%
2012	421	+1.18%
2017	421	+0.00%
2023	409	−0.48%
Source: INSEE

The inhabitants of Gurunhuel are known in French as gurunhuelois.

== See also ==
- Communes of the Côtes-d'Armor department
- List of the works of the Maître de Lanrivain
