= Meslan =

Meslan Mêlann
- Commune
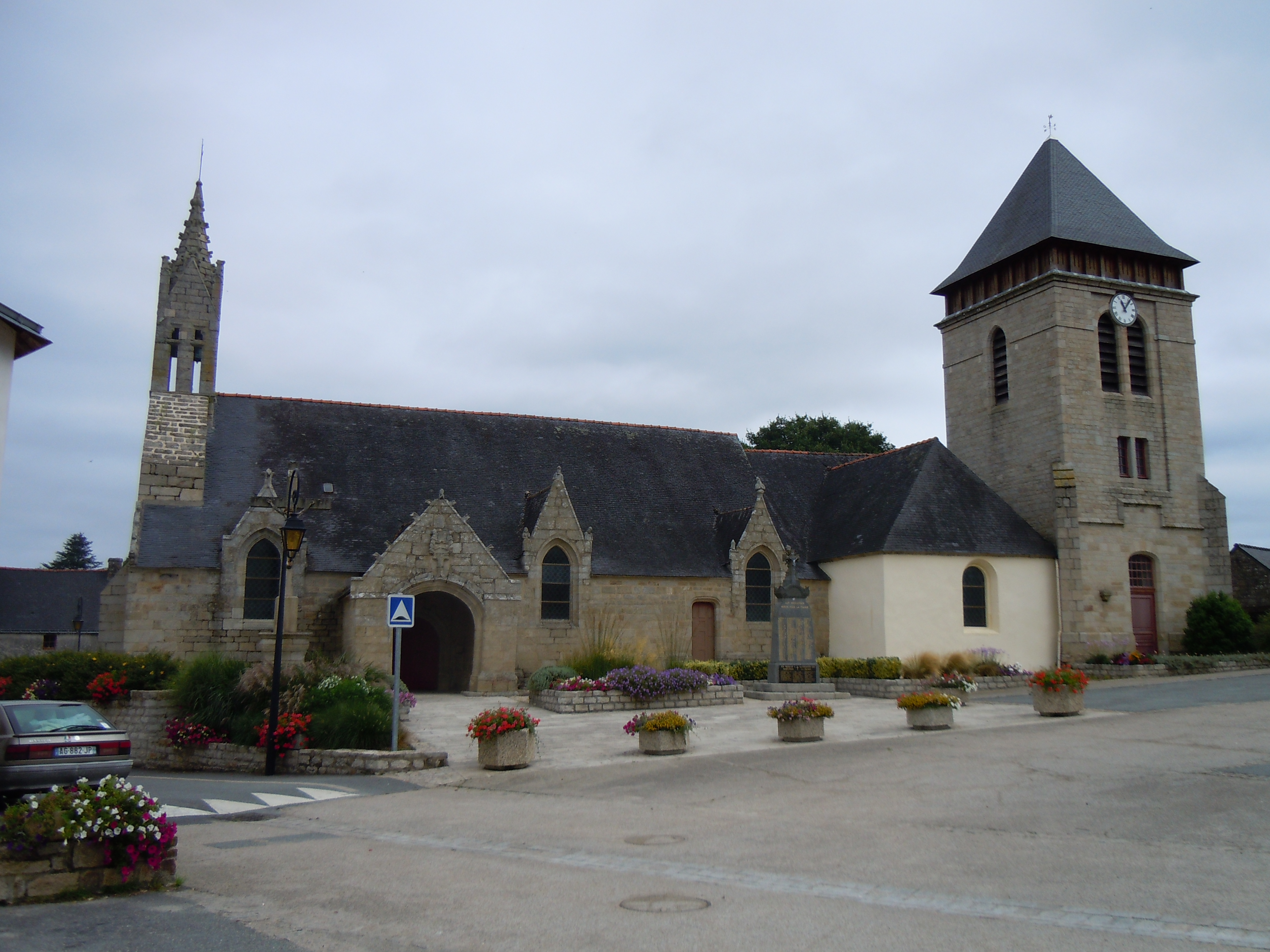
- The parish church in Meslan

- Coat of arms
- Location of Meslan
- Location within France Location within Brittany
- Coordinates: 47°59′42″N 3°25′49″W
- Country: France
- Region: Brittany
- Department: Morbihan
- Arrondissement: Pontivy
- Canton: Gourin
- Intercommunality: Roi Morvan Communauté

Government
  - Mayor (2026–32): Sébastien Wacrenier
- Area^{1}: 37.13 km^{2} (14.34 sq mi)
- Highest elevation: 160 m (520 ft)
- Lowest elevation: 35 m (115 ft)
- Population (2023): 1,479
  - Density: 39.83/km^{2} (103.2/sq mi)
- Time zone: UTC+01:00 (CET)
  - Summer (DST): UTC+02:00 (CEST)
- INSEE/Postal code: 56131 /56320
- ^{1} French Land Register data, which excludes lakes, ponds, glaciers > 1 km^{2} (0.386 sq mi or 247 acres) and river estuaries.

Meslan (French pronunciation: [melɑ̃]; Breton: Mêlann) is a commune in the Morbihan department of Brittany in north-western France.

== Population ==
Inhabitants of Meslan are called in French Meslannais.

Historical population

Year	Pop.	±% p.a.
1793	1,633	—
1800	1,695	+0.53%
1806	1,636	−0.59%
1821	1,755	+0.47%
1831	1,699	−0.32%
1836	1,860	+1.83%
1841	1,650	−2.37%
1846	1,889	+2.74%
1851	1,876	−0.14%
1856	1,840	−0.39%
1861	1,814	−0.28%
1866	1,940	+1.35%
1872	1,822	−1.04%
1876	1,876	+0.73%
1881	1,938	+0.65%
1886	2,028	+0.91%
1891	2,022	−0.06%
1896	2,168	+1.40%
1901	2,214	+0.42%

Year	Pop.	±% p.a.
1906	2,398	+1.61%
1911	2,470	+0.59%
1921	2,515	+0.18%
1926	2,790	+2.10%
1931	2,553	−1.76%
1936	2,533	−0.16%
1946	2,244	−1.20%
1954	2,044	−1.16%
1962	1,835	−1.34%
1968	1,656	−1.70%
1975	1,608	−0.42%
1982	1,630	+0.19%
1990	1,452	−1.44%
1999	1,193	−2.16%
2007	1,274	+0.82%
2012	1,391	+1.77%
2017	1,424	+0.47%
2023	1,479	+0.63%

Source: EHESS and INSEE (1968-2023)

== Geography ==
Historically it belongs to Vannetais and Pays Pourlet. Apart from the village centre, there are about eighty hamlets. Most of them consist in two or three houses but others are more important like Bonigeard. The river Ellé forms the western border of the commune.

== Map ==
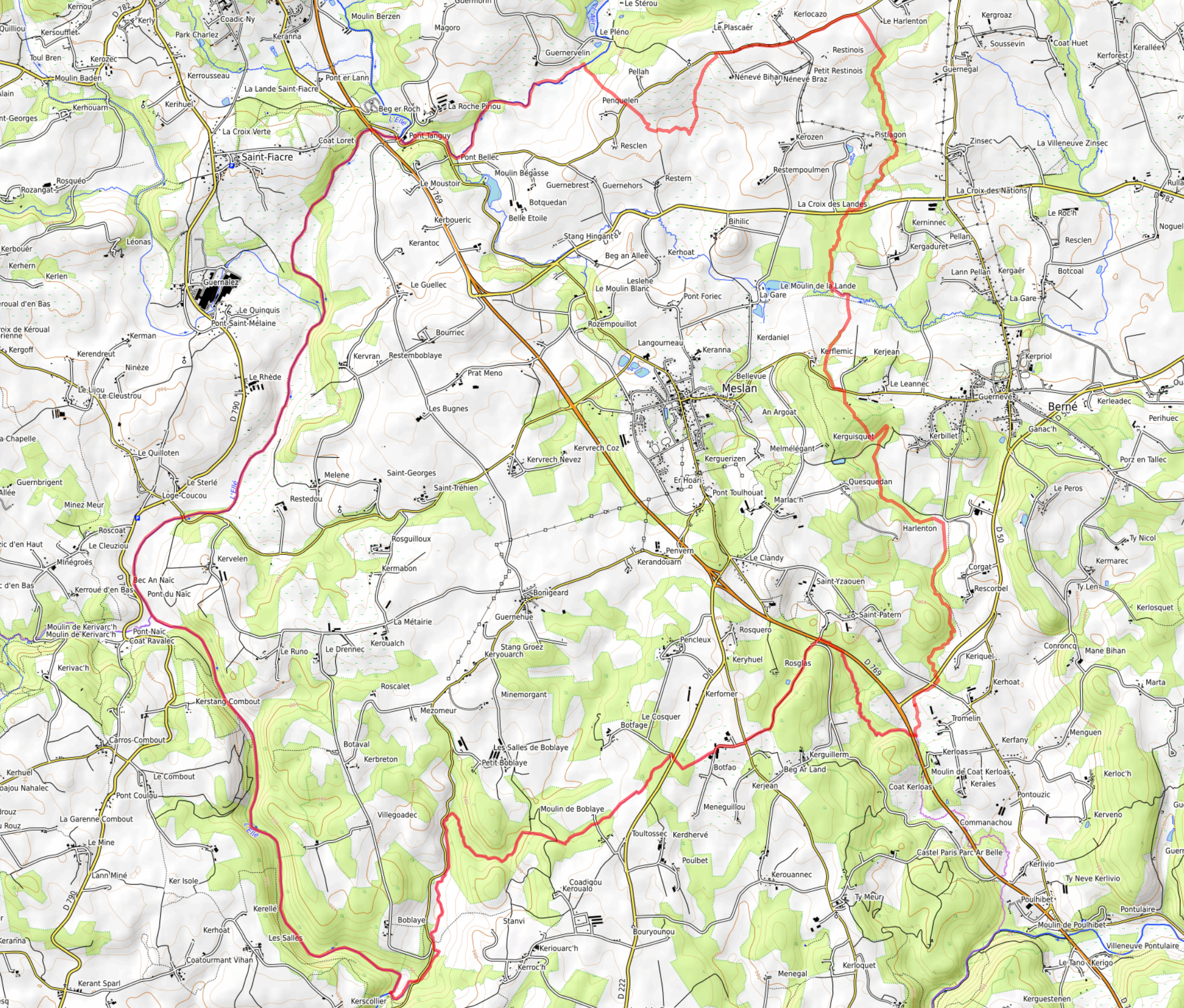
Topographic map

== List of places ==
- Bihilic
- Bodaval
- Bonijard
- Botquédan
- Bourriec
- Bugnes, les
- Château de Boblaye
- Clandy, le
- Cosquer, le
- Drennec, le
- Gare, la
- Garvic, le
- Guellec, le
- Guernebrest
- Guernehors
- Guernévé
- Harlenton, le
- Keranna
- Kerandouarn
- Kerantoc
- Kerbourriec
- Kerbreton
- Kerdaniel
- Kerflémic
- Kerforner
- Kerguerizen
- Kerguilloux
- Kerguisquet
- Kerhoat
- Keriquel
- Kermabon
- Keroualc'h
- Kerozen
- Kervélégan
- Kervelen
- Kervran
- Kervrec'h Coz
- Kervrec'h Nevez
- Keryouac'h
- Leslehé
- Méléné
- Melmélégan
- Méné Morgant
- Mézomeur
- Moulin Bégasse
- Moulin de Boblaye
- Moulin Julien
- Moustoir, le
- Nénevé Bihan
- Nénevé Braz
- Ouennec, le
- Pencleu
- Penquelen
- Penvern
- Petit Boblaye
- Pistiagon
- Pont Foriec
- Pont Tanguy
- Prat Guen
- Prat Méno
- Quesquédan
- Restédou
- Restemboblaye
- Resclen
- Restern
- Restinois
- Roscalet
- Rosglas
- Rozanpouillot
- Roz Guilloux
- Runo, le
- Saint Georges
- Saint Patern
- Saint Tréhien
- Saint Yzaouen
- Salles de Boblaye, les
- Stang Groez
- Stang Hingant
- Toulhoat
- Tulin
- Villegoadec
- Villebriant
- Villéon

== History ==
The parish church, placed under the patronage of Saint Mélaine, was rebuilt in 1577. The oldest surviving parish registers date back to 1678. The first mayor of Meslan, Louis Trouboul, was murdered by a gang of chouans on the night of January 9 to 10, 1795.

== Monuments ==
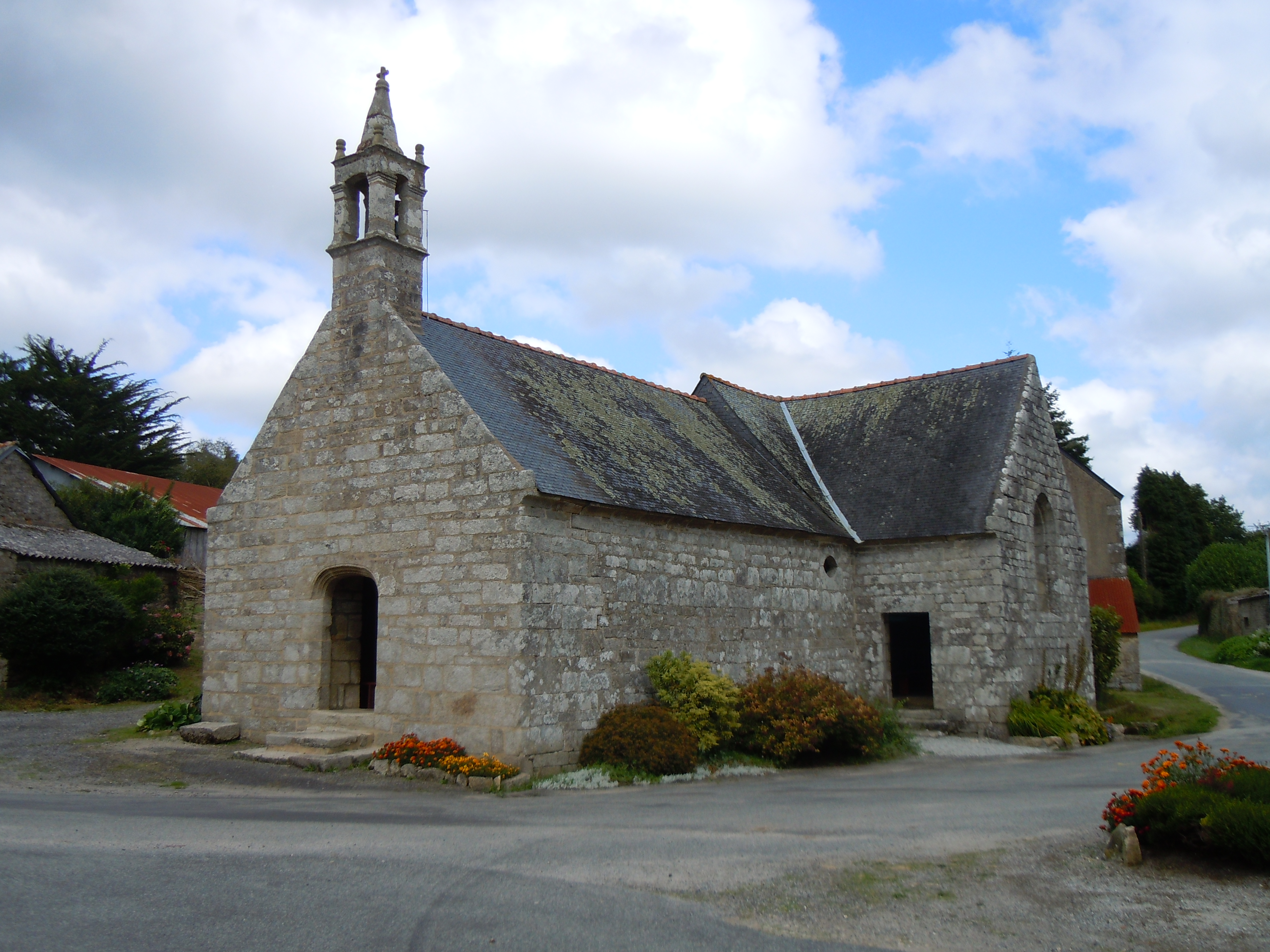
Chapel of Sainte-Catherine

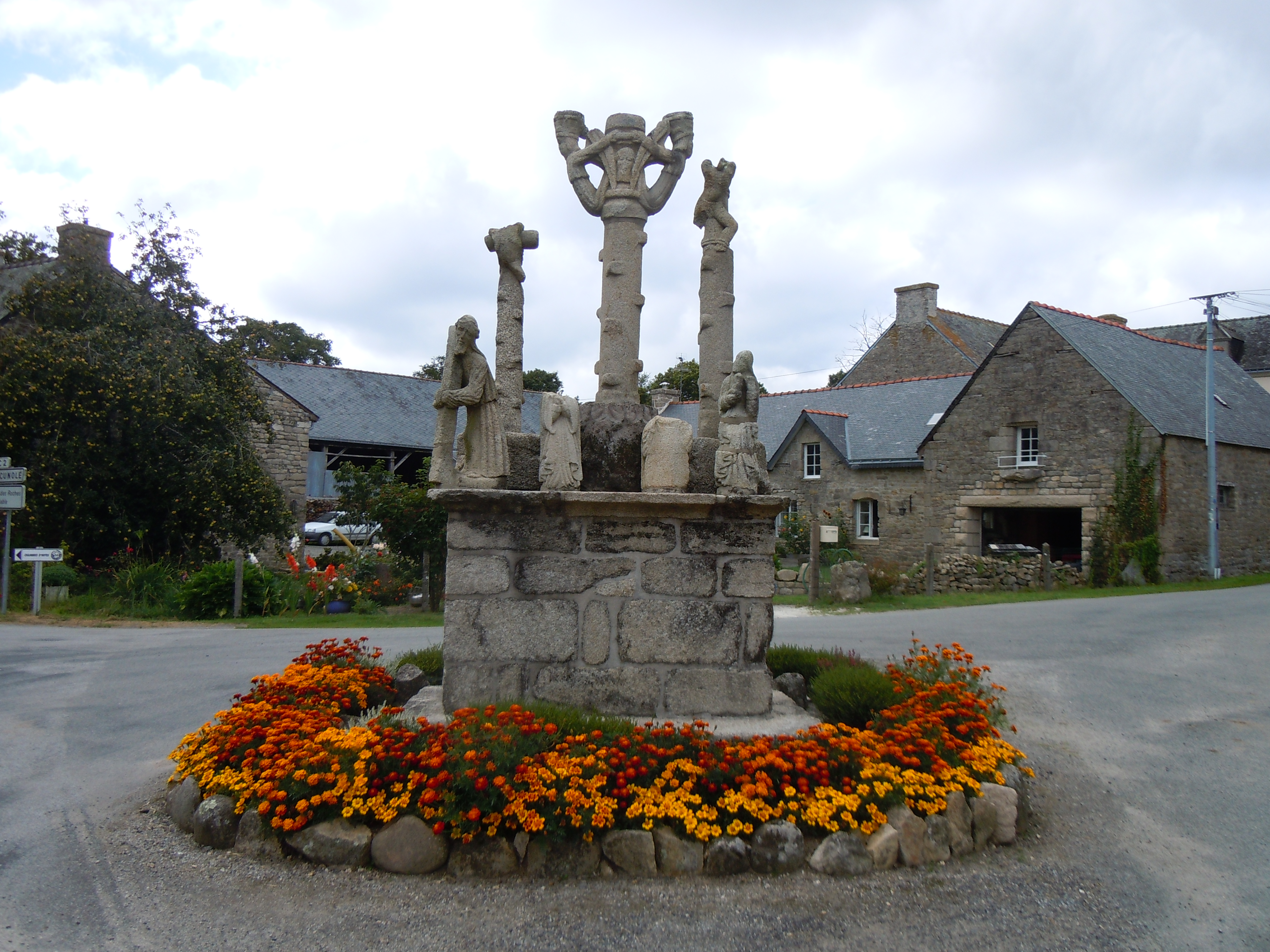
calvary of Bonigeard

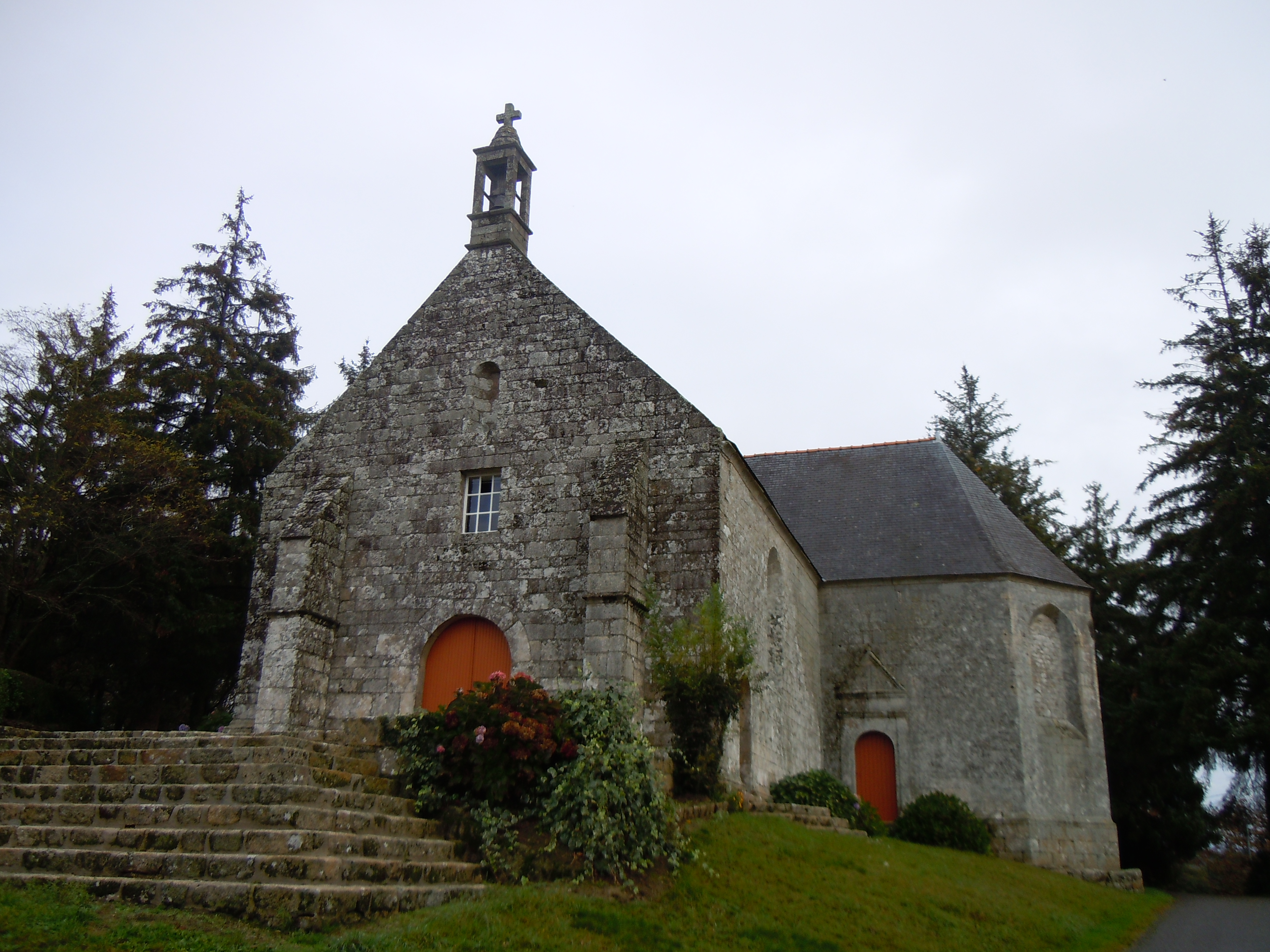
Chapel of Saint-Patern

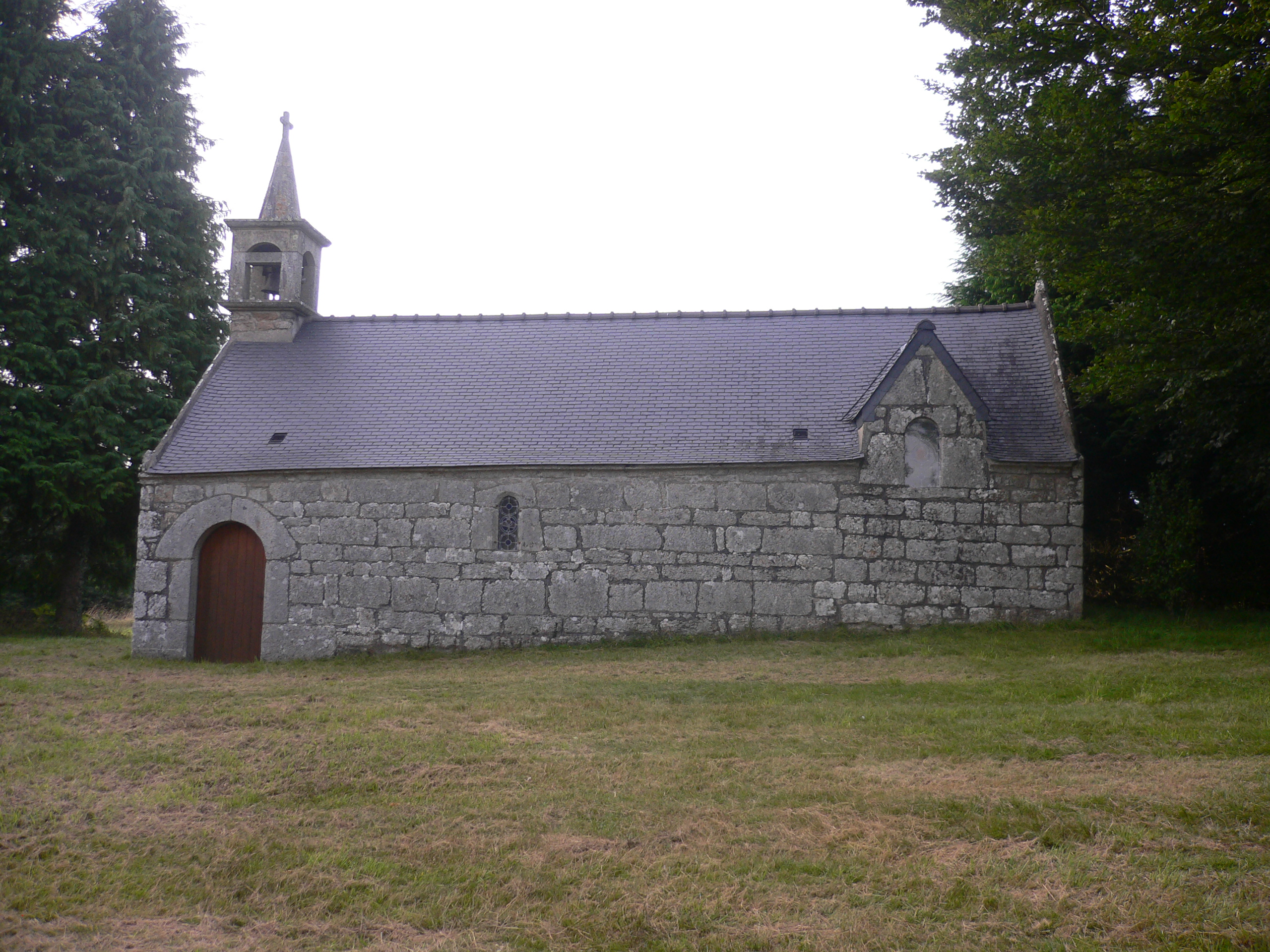
Chapel of Saint-Georges

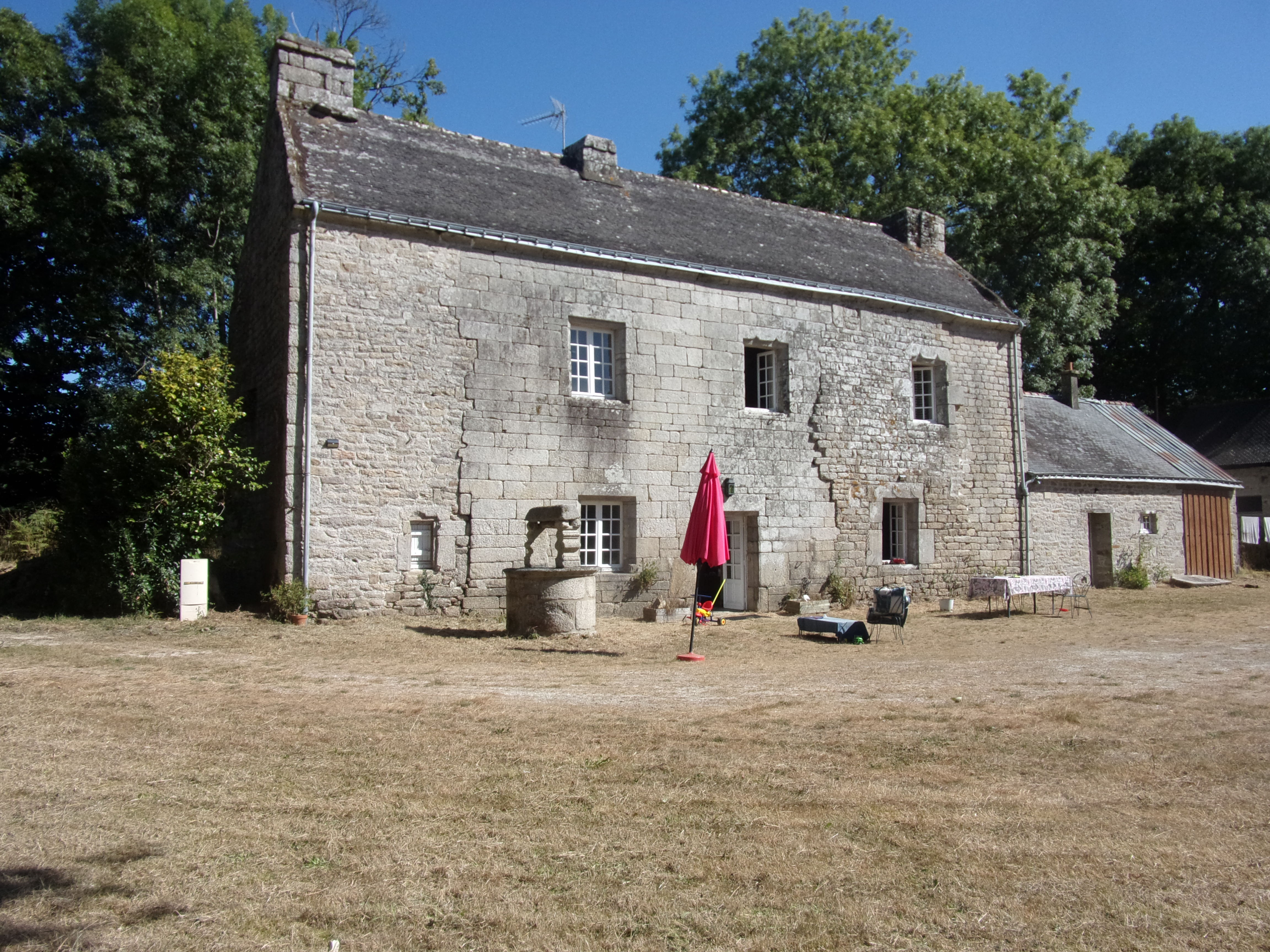
Manor of Kerroualch

== See also ==
- Communes of the Morbihan department
- List of the works of the Maître de Lanrivain
