= List of the works of the Maître de Lanrivain =

List of the works of the Maître de Lanrivain.

This is a listing/"catalogue raisonnė" of the works of the Maître de Lanrivain. His work can be seen in various parts of Brittany.

== Calvaries ==
| Type of sculpture | Location | Description|Notes |
|---|---|---|
| Chapel calvary | Bulat-Pestivien | The Maître de Lanrivain is attributed with the statuary on the Saint-Blaise de Pestivien chapel calvary. This comprises the good robber reversed with Mary Magdalene, the crucifix reversed with a pietà and the bad robber reversed with John the Evangelist as well as angels bearing chalices. On the large base supporting the cross are several sculptures. On the west face there is a "mise au tombeau, on the east face a scene showing the baptism of Christ (All that is left is Christ kneeling, the legs of a servant and the feet of John the baptist), on the south face the resurrected Christ (without head) and on the north face what are thought to be depictions of a rich man and Saint Yves. A statue of Saint Blaise (without head) has been moved into the chapel as well as remnants of the south face of the calvary. |
| Pietà | Le Faouët, Morbihan | In the Saint-Jean chapel's north transept there is a pietà attributed to the Maître de Lanrivain and in Le Faouet's Saint-Sébastien chapel he also carved a statue in granite depicting Christ displaying his wounds ("Christ montrant ses Plaies"). |
| Statues in chapel | Gourin | In the Moustérien chapel, the Maître de Lanrivain is credited with a statue of John the Evangelist in a niche on the west façade. |
| Statuary | Guiscriff | At Lande-Saint-Maudé is a statue of a saint in granite and the remains of a calvary all attributed to the Maître de Lanrivain. |
| Church calvary | Gurunhuel | Here the Maître de Lanrivain sculpted the Virgin Mary, the crucifix, John the Evangelist reversed with a pietà as well as four angels with chalices. On the large base he added depictions of Saint Paul, the cavalier Longin and Saint Peter and on the reverse Saint Michael fighting the dragon. On a pedestal he added a "Christ aux outrages" and on the cross to Christ's right he added the good robber with his soul being carried off by an angel whilst on the cross to Christ's left he added the bad robber, but with a demon taking his soul away. A demon is ready to carry off the soul of the bad robber—part of the Gurunhuel calvary St Michael fights the dragon-part of the Gurunhuel calvary View of the Gurunhuel calvary The crucifix at Gurunhuel |
| Cemetery calvary | Lanrivain | Some of the statuary on this 1548 calvary was carved by the Maître de Lanrivain and some in 1866 by the sculptor Yves Hernot. Hernot sculpted the crucifix reversed with a depiction of the trinity with the Virgin Mary and John the Evangelist on either side, the good and bad robber and some angels with chalices, He also sculpted the statue of Saint Herve on the west face of the base. The Maître de Lanrivain is credited with the statuary on the calvary's base. On the west face is a statue of a rich and a poor man although the statue of Yves is by Hernot as well as the poor man's face, on the north face a "mise au tombeau" and on the east face Pontius Pilate with Christ, and the Baptism of Christ with statues of Christ and John the Baptist. Yves Hernot also sculpted the "Ecce Homo". The Lanrivain calvary The calvary at Lanrivain-Jesus is baptised The poor man. The statue on the Lanrivain calvary. The rich man. The statue on the Lanrivain calvary. The mise au tombeau |
| Calvary and other works | Meslan | The Bonigeard calvary is attributed to the Maître de Lanrivain. It has been damaged over the years but at the top of the main cross are two angels on either side of an image of Christ's face. On the pedestal are depictions of the heads of cherubs and on the calvary base is a depiction of Christ carrying the cross and various other fragments. At Meslan's Sainte-Catherine chapel are six fragments which came from the Bonigeard calvary and also at this chapel there is a statue of Saint Diboan in a niche in the fountain. In Meslan's Église Saint-Melaine there are further fragments from the Bonigeard calvary placed around some of the church windows. The Bonigeard calvary |
