= Bulat-Pestivien =

Bulat-Pestivien Bulad-Pestivien
- Commune
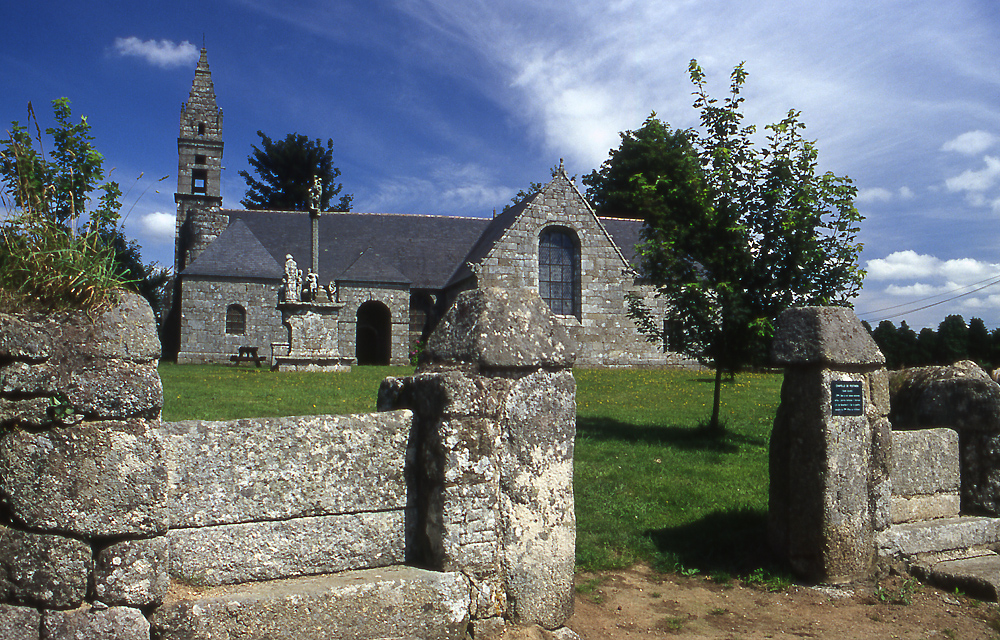
- Saint Blaise Chapel

- Coat of arms
- Location of Bulat-Pestivien
- Location within France Location within Brittany
- Coordinates: 48°25′46″N 3°19′46″W
- Country: France
- Region: Brittany
- Department: Côtes-d'Armor
- Arrondissement: Guingamp
- Canton: Callac
- Intercommunality: Guingamp-Paimpol Agglomération

Government
  - Mayor (2020–2026): Olivier Charles
- Area^{1}: 31.23 km^{2} (12.06 sq mi)
- Highest elevation: 307 m (1,007 ft)
- Lowest elevation: 189 m (620 ft)
- Population (2023): 406
  - Density: 13.0/km^{2} (33.7/sq mi)
- Time zone: UTC+01:00 (CET)
  - Summer (DST): UTC+02:00 (CEST)
- INSEE/Postal code: 22023 /22160
- ^{1} French Land Register data, which excludes lakes, ponds, glaciers > 1 km^{2} (0.386 sq mi or 247 acres) and river estuaries.

Bulat-Pestivien (French pronunciation: [bylat pɛstivjɛ̃]; Breton: Bulad-Pestivien) is a commune in the Côtes-d'Armor department of Brittany in northwestern France.

== Population ==
The inhabitants of Bulat-Pestivien are known in French as Bulatois.

Historical population

Year	Pop.	±% p.a.
1793	1,183	—
1800	1,213	+0.36%
1806	1,193	−0.28%
1821	1,303	+0.59%
1831	1,358	+0.41%
1836	1,543	+2.59%
1841	1,503	−0.52%
1846	1,603	+1.30%
1851	1,544	−0.75%
1856	1,478	−0.87%
1861	1,450	−0.38%
1866	1,592	+1.89%
1872	1,608	+0.17%
1876	1,696	+1.34%
1881	1,921	+2.52%
1886	1,747	−1.88%
1891	1,680	−0.78%
1896	1,719	+0.46%
1901	1,669	−0.59%

Year	Pop.	±% p.a.
1906	1,711	+0.50%
1911	1,755	+0.51%
1921	1,697	−0.34%
1926	1,605	−1.11%
1931	1,512	−1.19%
1936	1,357	−2.14%
1946	1,186	−1.34%
1954	1,038	−1.65%
1962	970	−0.84%
1968	812	−2.92%
1975	658	−2.96%
1982	531	−3.02%
1990	446	−2.16%
1999	432	−0.35%
2007	478	+1.27%
2012	458	−0.85%
2017	432	−1.16%
2023	406	−1.03%

Source: EHESS and INSEE (1968-2023)

== Map ==
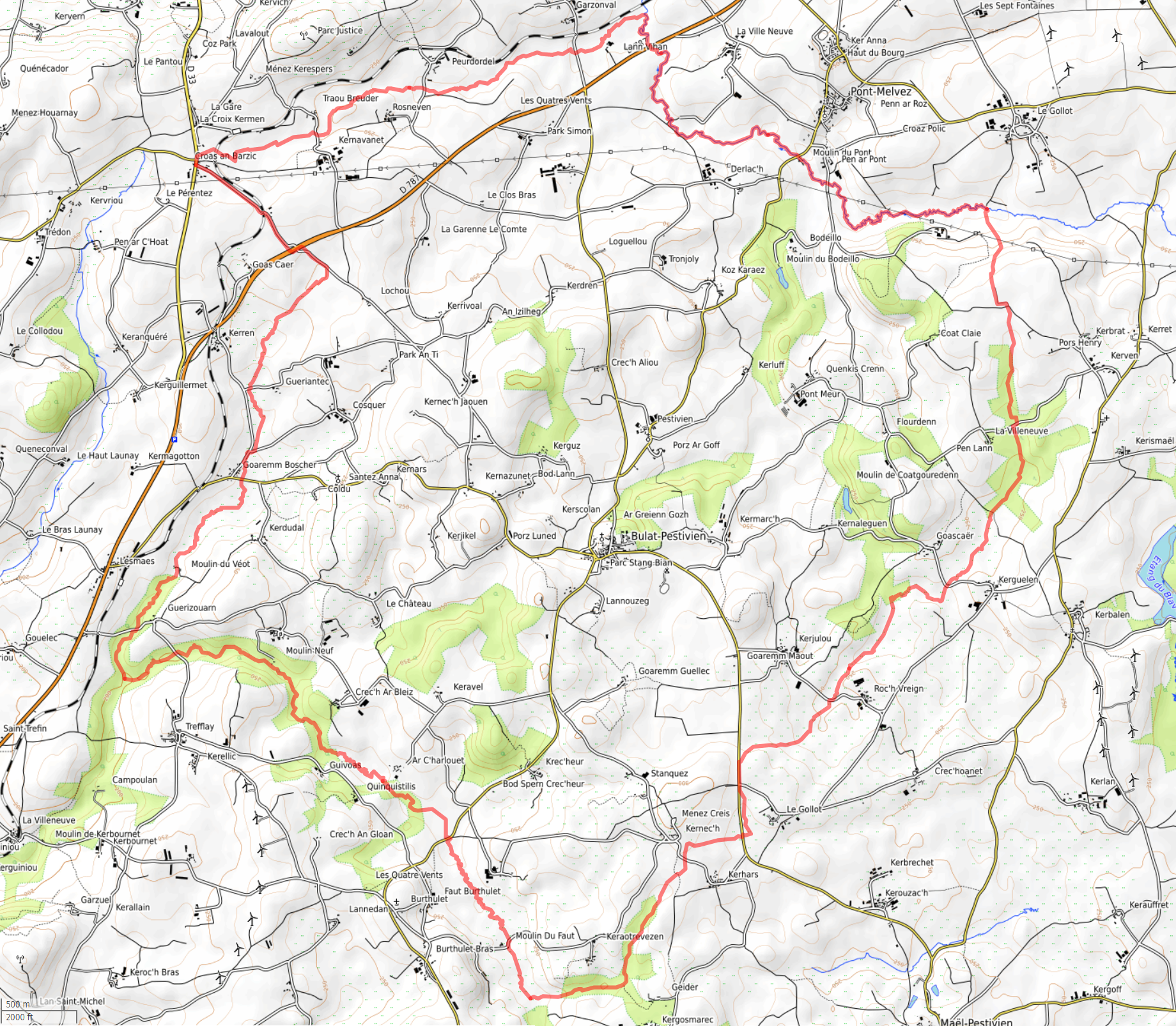
Topographic map.

== Breton language ==
In 2023, 100% of primary school children attended bilingual schools.

== See also ==
- Communes of the Côtes-d'Armor department
- List of the works of the Maître de Lanrivain
