= Le Faouët, Morbihan =

Commune in Brittany, France

Le Faouët Ar Faoued
- Commune
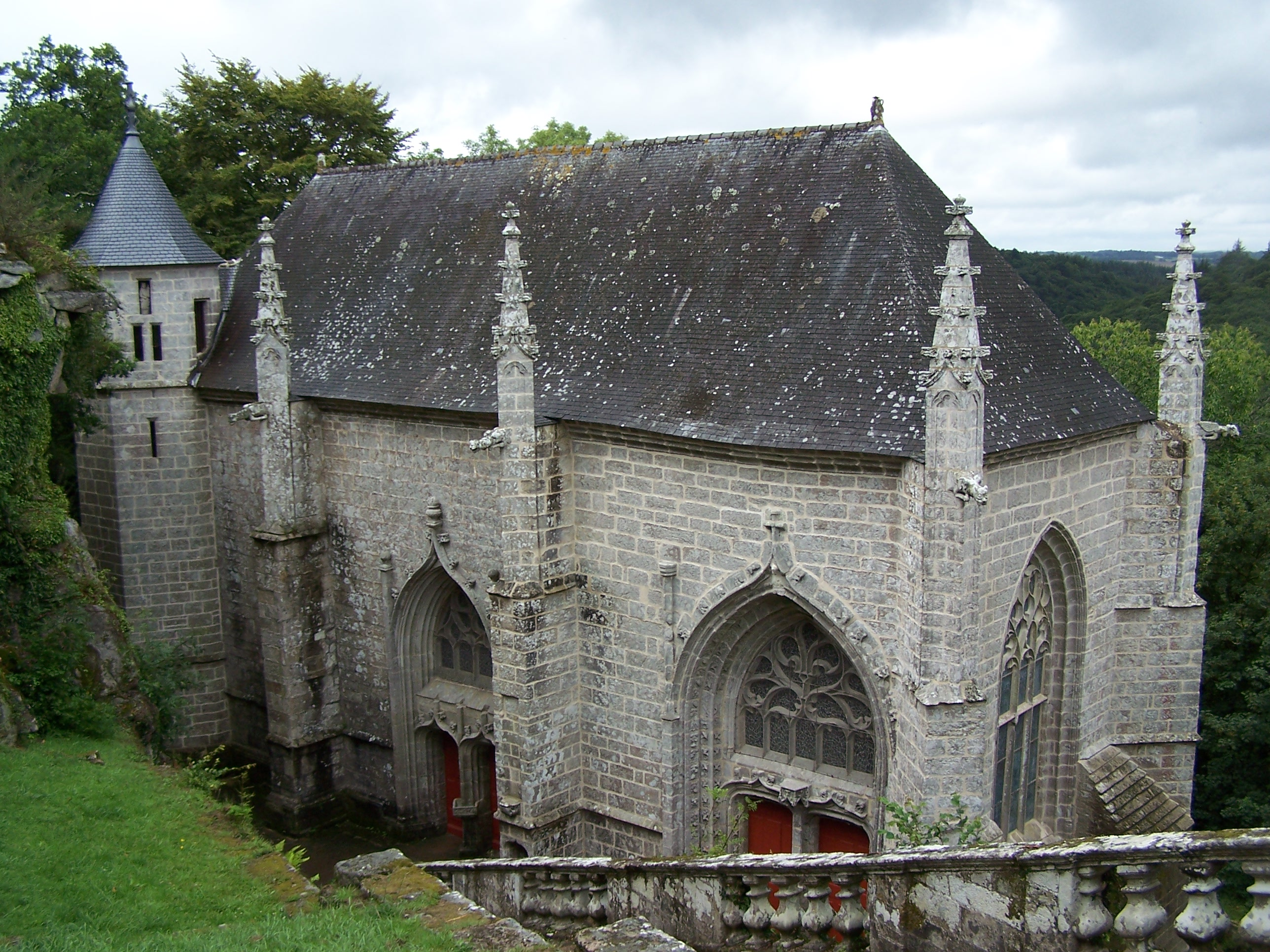
- Chapel of Saint Barbara

- Coat of arms
- Location of Le Faouët
- Location within France Location within Brittany
- Coordinates: 48°02′02″N 3°29′25″W
- Country: France
- Region: Brittany
- Department: Morbihan
- Arrondissement: Pontivy
- Canton: Gourin
- Intercommunality: Roi Morvan Communauté

Government
  - Mayor (2026–32): Christian Faivret
- Area^{1}: 34.03 km^{2} (13.14 sq mi)
- Elevation: 152 m (499 ft)
- Highest elevation: 202 m (663 ft)
- Lowest elevation: 53 m (174 ft)
- Population (2023): 2,814
  - Density: 82.69/km^{2} (214.2/sq mi)
- Time zone: UTC+01:00 (CET)
  - Summer (DST): UTC+02:00 (CEST)
- INSEE/Postal code: 56057 /56320
- ^{1} French Land Register data, which excludes lakes, ponds, glaciers > 1 km^{2} (0.386 sq mi or 247 acres) and river estuaries.

Le Faouët ([lə fawɛt]; Breton: Ar Faoued) is a commune in the Morbihan department of the region of Brittany in north-western France.

The 16th-century timber market hall is a noted feature of the town, and two medieval chapels lie within the boundaries of the commune.

== Toponymy ==
Faoued (French: Faouët) is a Breton word meaning "beech forest".

== Geography ==
Le Faouët/Ar Faoued is 19 km (12 mi) north of Quimperlé, 33 km (21 mi) northwest of Lorient and 47 km (29 mi) east of Quimper. It lies in the historical region of Cornouaille. Traditionally a Breton-speaking area, the French language became commonly used from the 1950s. The town lies in the valley of the river Ellé. The river Ellé forms the commune's eastern border. The river Inam forms the commune's western border and flows into the river Ellé. Apart from the town, there are about one hundred and twenty hamlets and isolated farms. In the center of the town stands the 16th-century timber market halls.

== Map ==
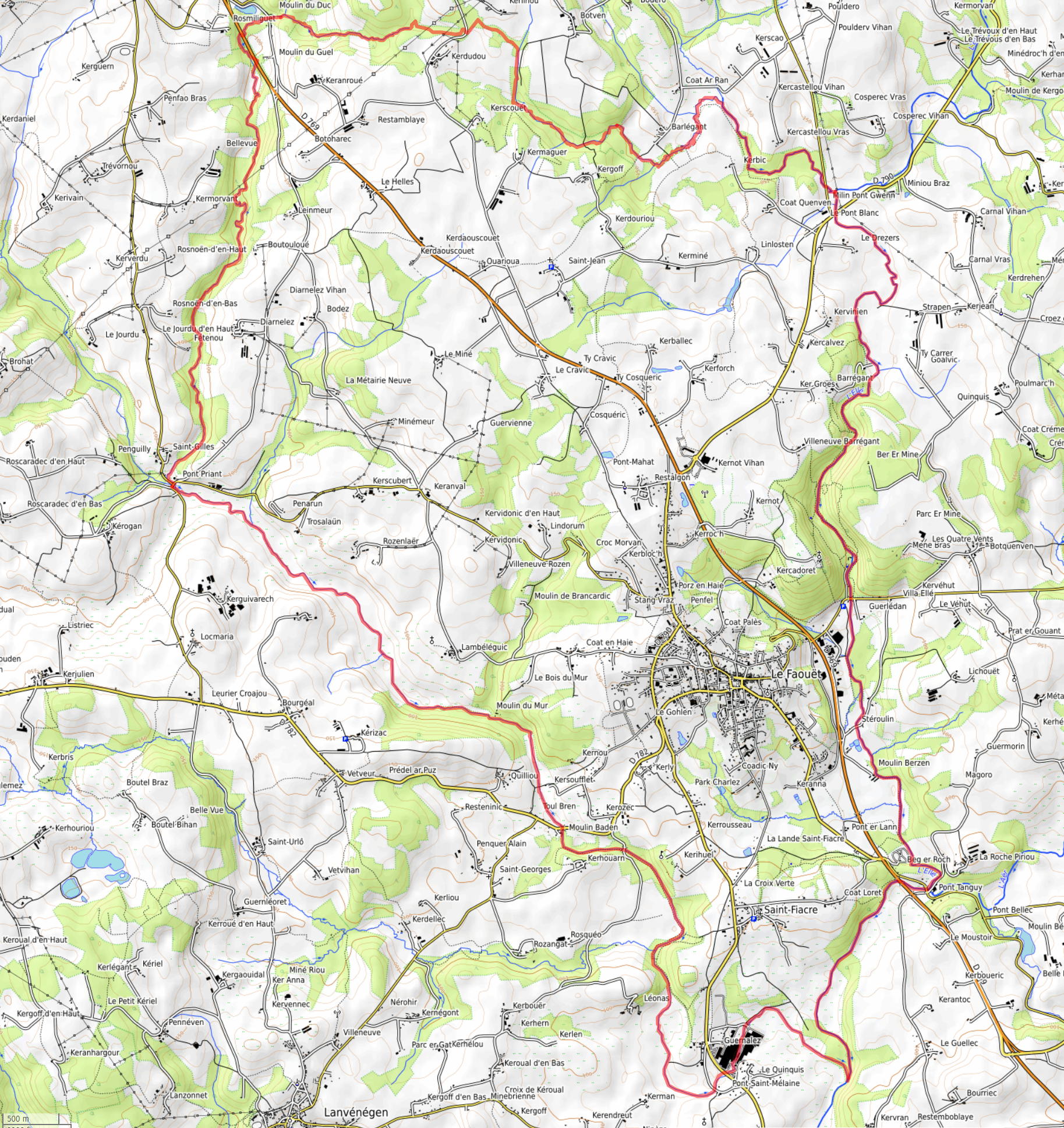
Topographic map

== List of places ==
- Barregan
- Beg er Roch
- Beg Roz
- Bodez
- Bois Clos, le
- Bois du Mur
- Botoharec
- Boutouloué
- Brancardic
- Brugou, (le)
- Coadic en Ny
- Coat en Haie
- Coat Loret
- Coat Palès
- Coat Quenven
- Cosquéric
- Cravic, (le)
- Croch Besquellou
- Croch Morvan
- Croix Verte, (la)
- Diarnelez
- Drezers
- Faouët, (le)
- Gohlen, (le)
- Gorez
- Grand Pont, (le)
- Guernalez
- Guervienne
- Helles (le)
- Keranna
- Ker Baniel
- Ker Calvez
- Ker Maria
- Ker Yannick
- Keranrouë
- Keranval
- Kerauffrédic
- Kerballec
- Kerbic
- Kerbloch
- Kercadoret
- Kerdaouscoët
- Kerdouriou
- Kerdudou
- Kerforc'h
- Kerforc'h Vihan
- Kergoff
- Kergroës
- Kerihuel
- Keriellou Vihan
- Keriellou Vras
- Kerly
- Kermaguer
- Kermine
- Kernot Vian
- Kernot Vras
- Kernou
- Kerosa
- Kerozec
- Kerroc'h
- Kerrousseau
- Kerscoët
- Kerscuber
- Kersoufflet
- Kervidonnic d'en Haut
- Kervinien
- Lambelleguic
- Lande de Saint Fiacre
- Leinlosten
- Leinmeur
- Lindorum
- Métairie Neuve, la
- Miné Cosquer
- Miné, le
- Minémeur
- Moulin Berzen
- Moulin Blanc
- Moulin de Barregan
- Moulin d'en Haut
- Moulin du Guel
- Moulin du Mur
- Moulin du Pont Blanc
- Ouarioua
- Parc Charles
- Parc Marrec
- Penanrun
- Penfel
- Petit Coat Loret
- Petit Coat Queven
- Petit Cosqueric
- Pont Blanc
- Pont du Duc
- Pont du Hellès
- Pont du Mabot
- Pont er Lann
- Pont er Mahat
- Pont Priant
- Pont Tanguy
- Porz en Haie
- Restalgon
- Restemblaye
- Rozenlaër
- Saint Adrien
- Sainte Barbe
- Saint Fiacre
- Saint Jean
- Saint Sébastien
- Stang Groez
- Stéroulin
- Toulsable
- Trosalaün
- Ty Ascouët
- Ty Blomen
- Ty Cosquéric
- Ty Cravic
- Ty Lann
- Ty Nehué
- Ty Parc
- Ty Planche
- Ty Poder
- Villeneuve Barrégan
- Villeneuve Pont er Lann
- Villeneuve Rouzen

== History ==
The oldest surviving parish registers date back to 1544. An infamous historical resident of Le Faouët is Marion du Faouët, the head of an 18th-century group of bandits who became a local bogeyman after her death.

== Administration ==
Until 2015, Le Faouët/Ar Faoued was the seat of the canton of Le Faouët, which consisted of 6 communes. Since the 2015 canton reorganisation, it is part of the canton of Gourin.

== Demographics ==
Inhabitants of Le Faouët are called Faouëtais.

Historical population
| Year | Pop. | ±% p.a. |
|---|---|---|
| 1968 | 3,048 | — |
| 1975 | 3,149 | +0.47% |
| 1982 | 3,177 | +0.13% |
| 1990 | 2,869 | −1.27% |
| 1999 | 2,806 | −0.25% |
| 2007 | 2,901 | +0.42% |
| 2012 | 2,821 | −0.56% |
| 2017 | 2,803 | −0.13% |
| 2023 | 2,814 | +0.07% |
Source: INSEE

== Breton language ==
In 2008, 14,24% of the children attended the bilingual schools in primary education.

== Tourist attractions ==
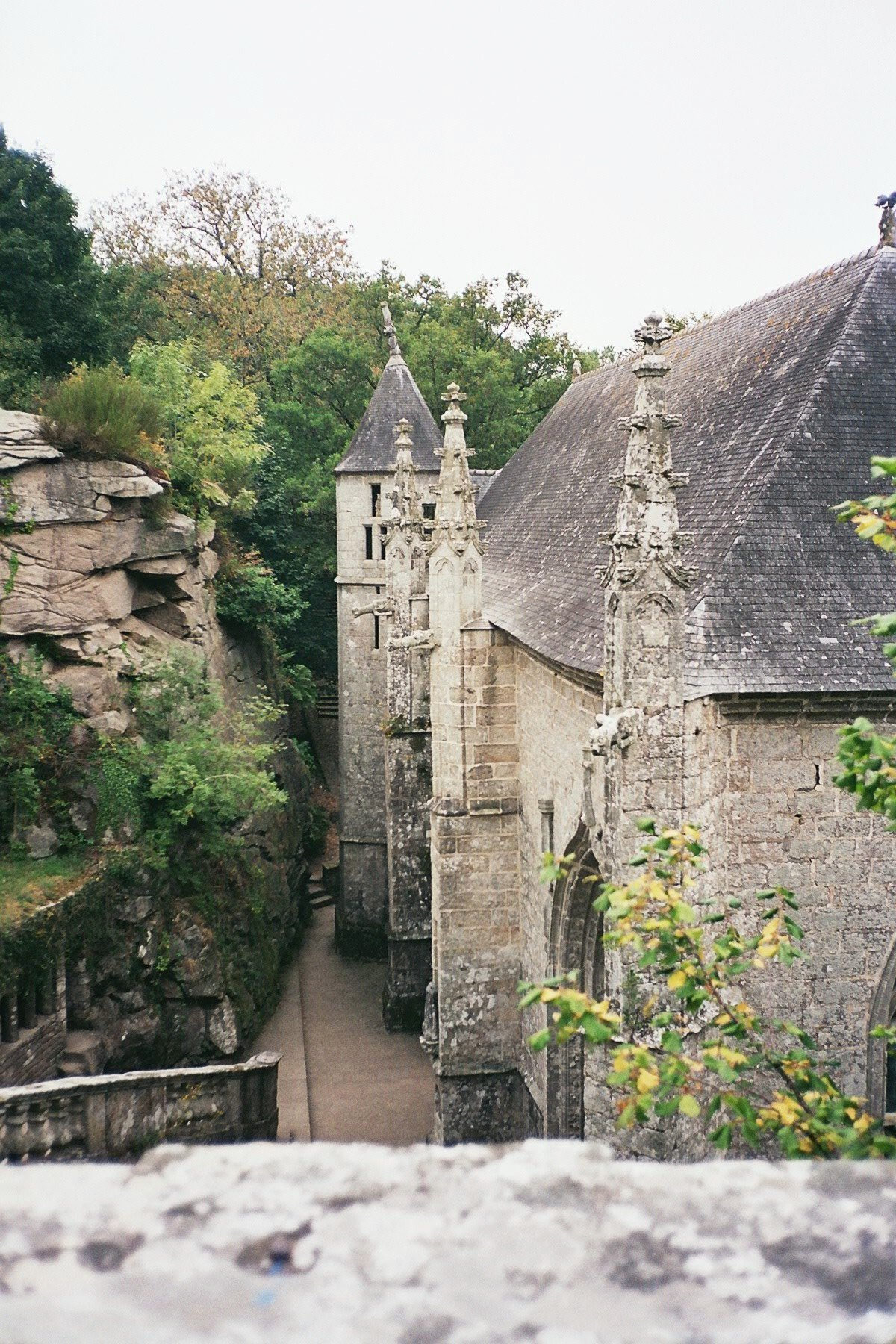
Chapel of Saint Barbara.

The 16th-century halles, or covered market, remain in use and are a rare surviving example of a large timber structure from the period.

The chapel of Saint Barbara is sited on a hilltop overlooking the Ellé. The 15th-century chapel of Saint Fiacre was recently restored. The polychrome timber interior was highly regarded, and earned its creator, Olivier Le Loergan, a title of nobility. The stained glass is also noteworthy. Parts of the interior have suffered considerable damage from insects.

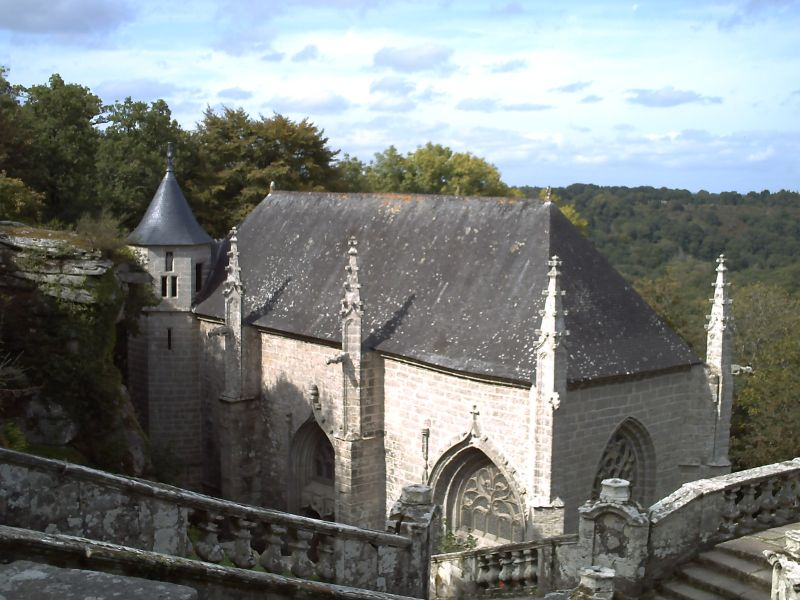
View of Chapelle Sainte Barbe Le Fouët

== See also ==
- Communes of the Morbihan department
- List of the works of the Maître de Lanrivain
- Henri Alphonse Barnoin
