= Again (Alan Stivell album) =

Studio album by Alan Stivell
- Released: 1993
- Recorded: Rennes, Nantes, London
- Genres: Celtic music Celtic fusion Celtic rock music of Brittany, folk music
- Length: 60:53
- Label: Keltia III / Disques Dreyfus

Alan Stivell chronology
The Mist of Avalon (1991)	Again (1993)	Brian Boru (1995)

Again is the Alan Stivell's seventeenth album released in 1993 under the Keltia III label by Disques Dreyfus and Sony Music in France. He registers again his greatest successes of the seventies with updated arrangements and help of prestigious guests : Kate Bush, Shane MacGowan from the Irish group The Pogues, the Senegal singer Doudou Ndiaye Rose, the French singers Laurent Voulzy and Breton singers Gilles Servat and Yann-Fañch Kemener.

The album, several times golden record with more than 300.000 sold copies, boosts the interest for the Celtic music, the base for a new wave of his popularity, especially in Brittany and in France. The public immediately acclaimed the album and Stivell during his French tour, with two concerts at the Bataclan, Paris, in January 1994. That is when the Héritage des Celtes of his former guitarist Dan ar Braz is going to arouse the craze of the general public.

== Track listing ==
No.	Title	guests	Length
1.	"Suite Sudarmoricaine"	Shane MacGowan	3:24
2.	"An Dro / Tha Mi Sgìth"	Gillan O’Donovan	3:27
3.	"Ar An Garraig / Telenn Wad"		2:10
4.	"The Foggy Dew"	Shane MacGowan	3:04
5.	"Suzy Mc Guire" (Siobhan Ni Dhuibhir)	Ffran May	4:31
6.	"Suite Irlandaise"	Doudou N'Diaye Rose	4:07
7.	"Spered Hollvedel"	Gillan O’Donovan, Dan Ar Braz	4:25
8.	"Son Ar Chistr"	Gilles Servat, James Wood	3:12
9.	"Marv Ma Mestrez"		4:03
10.	"Kimiad"	Kate Bush, John Giblin, Charlie Morgan, Alan Murphy	4:31
11.	"Suite Des Montagnes"		2:42
12.	"Metig"	Ffran May	3:34
13.	"Pop Plinn"	Patrice Paichereau	3:14
14.	"Bal-ha-Dans Plinn"	Yann-Fañch Kemener	3:48
15.	"O'Neil's March / The King of the Fairies"		2:50
16.	"Ian Morrisson Reel"	Dan Ar Braz	5:01
17.	"Tri Martolod"	Laurent Voulzy, Shane MacGowan, Gweltaz Adeux, Karel Holas au violon	3:22

== Personnel ==
- Alan Stivell - Arranger, Bombard, Harp (Celtic Acoustic & Electric), Composer, Dulcimer, Irish flute, Keyboards, Percussion, Pipes, Vocals
- Dan Ar Braz - Electric Guitar
- Herve Batteux - Drums, Percussion
- Philippe Chasseloup - Harmonica
- Jean-Luc Chevalier - Electric Guitar
- Carlos Delgado - Kena, Pan Flute
- John Giblin - Bass
- Karel Holas - Violin, Violin (Electric)
- Herve Kefelean - Banjo
- Robert Le Gall - Electric violin
- Pierrick Lemou - Bouzouki, Violin
- Charlie Morgan - Drums
- Alan Murphy - Guitar
- Patrice Paichereau - Guitar
- Dina Rakotomanga - Bass, Double Bass
- Doudou N'Daiye Rose - Percussion
- Catherine Saint-James - Cello
- Guillaume Saint-James - Keyboards, Saxophone
- Michal Senbauer - Guitar
- Davy Spillane - Pipe
- Vocals : Kate Bush (Arranger, Keyboards, Producer), Shane MacGowan, Laurent Voulzy, Gilles Servat, Yann-Fañch Kemener, Gweltaz-Thierry Adeux, James Wood, Gill O'Donovan, Ffran May

=== Recording ===
- Laurent Dayot - Engineer (Transaction - Ubu, Rennes)
- Erik Chauvieres - Mixing (Arpège Studio, Nantes)
- Herve Le Coz - Mixing
- Del Palmer - Mixing (Abbey Road Studios, London)
- Frederic Marin - Mastering (Translab)
- Jean-Baptiste Millot - Photography

== Discography ==
- Dreyfus Disques FDM36198-2 [original French release]
- Mercury [1994]
- Membran [2011]
