= Dan Ar Braz =

Breton folk guitarist (born 1949)

Dan ar Braz
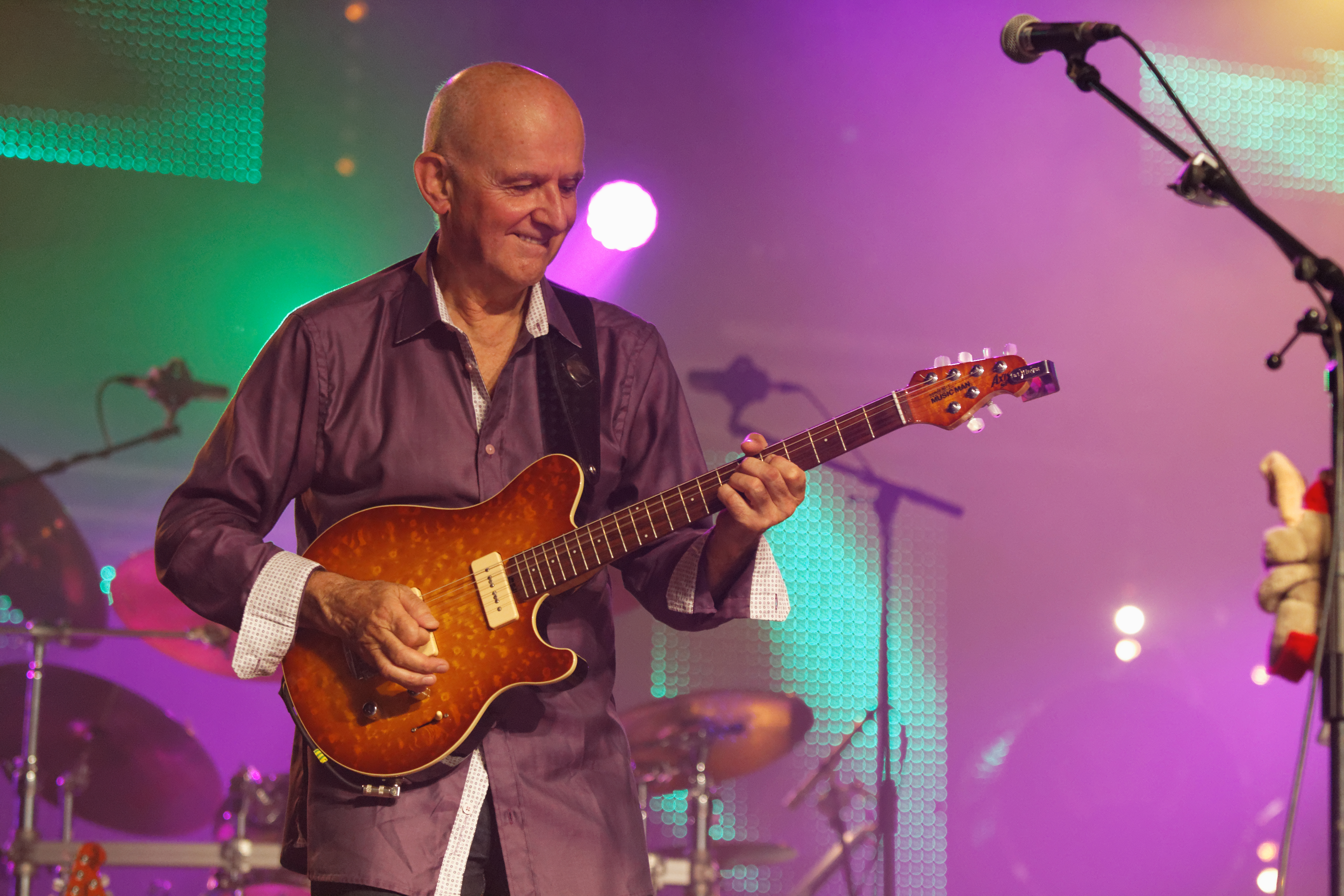
- Dan ar Braz at Festival de Cornouaille of Quimper in 2013

Background information
- Born: 15 January 1949 (age 77); Quimper, Brittany, France
- Origin: Breton
- Genres: Breton music; Celtic rock; folk

Daniel Le Bras (born 15 January 1949), known by his stage name Dan Ar Braz (Breton pronunciation: [ˈdãːnː ar ˈbrɑːs]), is a Breton guitarist, singer, composer and the founder of L'Héritage des Celtes, a 50-piece Pan-Celt band. As a leading guitarist in Celtic music band, he recorded as a soloist with Celtic harp player Alan Stivell. He also represented France in the Eurovision Song Contest 1996.

== Career ==
=== Apprenticeship and Alan Stivell years ===
At the age of 13, Daniel Le Bras obtained his first guitar after teaching himself how to play, inspired by guitarists like Hank Marvin, Bert Jansch, and The Pretty Things. Daniel's father insisted that he study catering instead of music. At the age of 17, he performed locally in Bal-musette, interpreting folk-rock songs by Donovan, Van Morrison, and Rory Gallagher.

In 1967, Bras met Breton harpist and singer Alan Stivell who invited him to join his group. Alan Stivell and his musicians embraced Breton, Scottish, and Irish music, and were also later joined by Gabriel Yacoub to form Malicorne. Alan's father had made a reconstruction of the ancient Breton harp in 1953, and Alan learned to play the harp, bagpipes, and Irish flute.

Stivell opened Bras's eyes to the possibilities of Celtic music and its proximity to rock. Stivell rebranded Daniel Le Bras as "Dan Ar Bras" to show that he belonged to Breton culture rather than French culture. In 1971, with "Pop Plinn", "for the first time rock music was put in service for a traditional Breton dance song." His electric guitar made the "essential element of Stivell's sound for more than a decade" and made contributions to nine of Stivell's albums, including the influential "Renaissance of the Celtic Harp" and "Olympia Concert" in 1972. After a successful tour in France in 1972–73, Breton Music was undergoing a revival and they traveled around Europe, North America, and Australia.

At the same time in 1972, Dan Ar Bras formed his own group called Mor. Compared to Stivell's group, this was the middle-of-the-road and it broke up shortly after recording one album, Stations, released in 1973.

=== Solo career ===
In 1976, Braz relocated to Oxfordshire and joined the folk-rock band Fairport Convention. He changed his name to Dan Ar Braz (with a "z"), and for about a year he toured with the band but did not perform on any of their studio albums. This experience allowed him to work with prominent Anglophone musicians such as Dave Pegg and Rory Gallagher, and even appeared on the cover of Melody Maker (February 1976).

Homesick for Brittany, Braz released the instrumental progressive folk album, "Douar Nevez" in 1977. In three years, he recorded three Celtic music solo-albums. By this time, he was making sales in the United States.

=== 1980s ===
Braz released a collegian album of Irish jigs and reels in 1979, entitled Irish Reels, Jigs, Hornpipes and Airs with a band featuring Davey Graham, Dave Evans, and Duck Baker. It was not commercially successful, and for several years, Braz moved away from Celtic music. In 1981, he toured Europe promoting his album Acoustic, a subdued collection of instrumentals, written by himself. He then joined a blues-rock trio. Between 1984 and 1987, he toured the United States over a dozen times.. By the time Braz recorded Musiques pour les silences à venir (Music for the Silences to Come) in 1985, he was being described as "New Age". After making another instrumental album, he moved in a new direction by recording a collection of songs in English, Songs (1990). Most were written by him, plus one each by Richard Thompson, Sandy Denny, Paul Brady, and Donovan. He teamed up with John Kirkpatrick to record a film score in 1992.

=== L'Héritage des Celtes ===
==== Formation and success ====
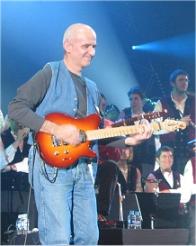
Dan Ar Braz at the Festival Interceltique de Lorient in 2006

Dan Ar Braz's greatest moment occurred in 1992, when the organizer of the Festival de Cornouaille in Quimper asked him to create a live show uniting traditional music with modern styles. Dan had many contacts in Britain, France, and America, and delivered beyond all expectations. Donal Lunny came from Ireland, Karen Matheson came from Scotland, Elaine Morgan came from Wales, and both Bagad Kemper and Alan Stivell came from Brittany. Altogether, 75 musicians were involved. The group called L'Héritage des Celtes performed their debut show at the Quimper festival in July 1993, then went on to Rennes in 1994. A hugely successful studio recording recreated the show. It sold 100,000 copies in over ten countries – 15,000 in the first week of release – and a live album followed. Their fame within France was so great that in 1996 they represented France in the 41st Eurovision Song Contest, singing in Breton.

==== Finisterres ====
In 1997, they recorded the album "Finisterres" and again sold 100,000 copies. The music awards ceremony Victoires de la Musique awarded them "Best Traditional Music Album" in 1998. They went on tour in France and played the biggest stages of Paris Le Zénith and Bercy Arena on St Patrick's Day in 1999. But with more than 70 musicians on stage at once, the show was tremendously difficult to put on. In August 2000, the group played at the Festival Interceltique in the stadium of Lorient where Dan announced that it would be the final concert.

=== Return to solo work ===
Dan Ar Braz returned to solo work. La mémoire des volets blancs (2001) is a tribute to the deceased friends from his childhood, and is a nostalgic instrumental piece. He performed in another major show at the Stade de France on St Patrick's Day in 2002.

For the following albums, he worked with his friends, singers Clarisse Lavanant, Jean-Jacques Goldman, and Red Cardell. In 2012, with Bagad Kemper, he produced Celebration in Brittany, an album and a tour-unifier which gets closer to the spirit of L'Héritage des Celtes, but centers on Brittany.

In 2015, the album Cornouailles Soundtrack was produced, which takes a more contemplative turn, telling the story of his life in instrumentals that range from "Moon River" and "Oh Shenandoah" to Braz's own compositions in a style that echoes his musical heroes, The Shadows.

== Discography ==
With the band Mor (as a founding-member guitarist)

- Stations (1972)

With Alan Stivell (as a guitarist)

- Renaissance of the Celtic Harp (1972)
- Olympia Concert (1972)
- From Celtic Roots (1973)
- E Langonned (1974)
- Live in Dublin (1975)
- Treman Inis (1976)
- Before Landing (1977)
- Again (1993)

Solo albums as Dan Ar Braz

- Douar Nevez (1977)
- Allez dire à la ville (1978)
- The Earth's Lament (1979)
- Acoustic (1981)
- Music For the Silences To Come / Musique pour les silences à venir (1985)
- Septembre bleu (1988)
- Songs (1990)
- Frontières de sel / Borders of Salt (1991)
- Rêve de Siam (1992) (OST)
- Xavier Grall chanté par Dan Ar Braz (1992)
- Theme for the Green Lands (1994)
- Kindred Spirit (1995)
- La Mémoire des volets blancs (2001)
- Celtiques (2003)
- À toi et ceux (2004)
- Frontières de sel (2006) (DVD & CD)
- Les Perches du Nil (2007)
- Comptines celtiques et d'ailleurs (2009)
- Celebration (2012)
- Célébration d'un héritage (2014) (live album)
- Cornouailles Soundtrack (2015)

Various artists

- Irish Reels, Jigs, Hornpipes and Airs (1979) (with Duck Baker, Dave Evans, Davey Graham)
- Irish Reels, Jigs, Airs and Hornpipe's: Arranged for Finger Picking Solo Guitar (1990) (with Dave Evans, Duck Baker)

Solo compilations

- Islands of memories – Les îles de la mémoire (1992)
- Made in Breizh (2002)
- Bretagnes : ici, ailleurs, là-bas (2011)

Preceded by Nathalie Santamaria with Il me donne rendez-vous	France in the Eurovision Song Contest; 1996 (with l'Héritage des Celtes)	Succeeded by Fanny with Sentiments songes
