= Emerald (Alan Stivell album) =

Studio album by Alan Stivell
- Released: October 2009
- Recorded: 2009 - Rennes (Brittany)
- Genre: Celtic music - Celtic fusion Celtic rock - Neofolk Music of Brittany
- Length: 57:55
- Label: Coop Breizh / Harmonia Mundi
- Producer: Alan Stivell

Alan Stivell chronology
Explore (2007)	Emerald (2009)	AMzer: Seasons (2015)

Emerald is the 23rd album by Breton musician Alan Stivell, released in 2009. The album celebrates Stivell's 40-year career (Emerald wedding) since 1970's Reflets (Reflections), his first album as a singer. It's a return to the roots, a return to the violin and to folk-rock (Chemins de Terre), and both an ever innovative approach, playing on electric harp and bagpipes prototypes and in musical arrangements that are as eclectic as they are original.

== Overview ==
Stivell chooses to travel across the Celtic nations, worldwide (Africa, India, America) and through the musical styles that influenced him (folk-rock, electropop, traditional). He created a mix of acoustic and electric Celtic harps and bagpipes, folk-rock orchestration (violins, guitars, percussion) navigating in different cultures and languages. In the single Brittany's - Ar Bleizi mor (wolffish, sailors), he pay homage to the sea, which he claims its role as a link between peoples. With his very distinctive vocal and writing styles, he effortlessly blends Breton, French and English (along with Gaelic and Welsh). In addition, Stivell wanted to present songs that were popular in the Brittany of yesteryear as well as in English-speaking and other Celtic countries.

== Track listing ==
No.	Title	Length
1.	"Brittany's" (Ar Bleizi Mor)	5:56
2.	"Lusk" (Skye Boat Song)	4:08
3.	"Marionig" (in reference to Marion du Faouët)	3:29
4.	"Tamm ha tamm" (Rennes, Nantes & Brest)	3:16
5.	"Gaels' Call" (Glaoch na nGael)	6:07
6.	"Harplinn"	4:13
7.	"Goadec Rock" (in reference to Goadec Sisters)	5:17
8.	"Eibhlin" (Eileen a Roon)	6:52
9.	"Aquarelle" (Er penn all d'al lanne)	3:44
10.	"An hirañ noz" (Noël, Espoir / Ar hyd y nos / All Through The Night)	4:41
11.	"Mac Crimon (9.12)" (part I)	2:23
12.	"Mac Crimon (9.12)" (part II)	4:51
13.	"Mac Crimon (9.12)" (part III)	2:58
Total length:		57:55

== Personnel ==
- Alan Stivell - vocals, harps, bagpipes, bombarde, flutes, percussion, synthesizers, piano, arrangements, production and composition
- Loumi Seveno - violins, alti, viele, bodhran (1,2,4,5,7,8,9)
- Christope Peloil - alto (2)
- Gaetan Grandjean - acoustic and electric guitar
- Nicolas Méheust - Hammond organ, melotron, piano, bass
- Marcus Camus - percussion, drums
- Iwan Ellien du Bagad Gwengamp - Scottish soldier drum (3)
- Dom Duff - vocals (1,4)
- Solenn Lefeuvre - vocals (2)
- Ensemble choral du Bout du Monde directed by Christian Desbordes (11,12)

== See also ==
=== External links ===
- Official website
