= À l'Olympia (Alan Stivell album) =

Live album by Alan Stivell
- Released: 1972
- Recorded: February 28, 1972
- Venues: L'Olympia in Paris by Paul Houdebine & Henri Lousteau
- Genres: Celtic music Celtic fusion Celtic rock music of Brittany, folk music
- Length: 42:47
- Label: Fontana/Philips
- Producer: Franck Giboni

Alan Stivell chronology
Renaissance of the Celtic Harp (1971)	À l'Olympia (1972)	Chemins de Terre (1973)

À l'Olympia (Also called At the Olympia and Olympia Concert) was Stivell's first live album, recording at L'Olympia. It was released by Fontana in 1972.

== Background ==
=== Significance ===
This live concert was divided into two parts: the first acoustic folk, the second part being electric folk in a style then known as Celtic rock. The concert was a musical tour around the Celtic fringe, from Brittany northwards. It was broadcast live on one of the three radio stations in France (seven million listeners live on Radio Europe 1) Alan Stivell was accompanied by Dan Ar Braz on guitar, Michel Santangelli (the future drummer for Jacques Higelin) on percussion, Gabriel Yacoub, René Werneer, Pascal Stive, Gérard Levasseur, Serj Parayre and Michaël Klec’h.

Stivell à l'Olympia has sold over 1.5 million copies.

=== Context and impact ===
1972, the year of its release, was one of radical ferment at home and abroad. The widespread revolt of May 1968 had generated a "back to the earth" movement amongst French students and intelligentsia. The entry of Britain and Ireland into the EEC was seen by radicals in Brittany as the long-awaited opportunity to bring the Celtic nations together and make the ancient dream of Celtic unity a reality. Alan Stivell was closely identified with these trends, even at times hailed as a champion of one or the other cause, but he was himself, as he often later claimed, uneasy about taking on the role of a musical freedom fighter. His deep fascination with cutting edge technology, fuelled by his early love of science fiction put him at odds with any "back to the earth" idealism. Despite the hopes he shared with many of his fellow Breton for a Celtic cultural revival and unity, he always sought to avoid being straight-jacketed by a narrow traditionalist outlook.

== Track listing ==
No.	Title	Length
1.	"The Wind of Keltia"	3:42
2.	"An Dro"	3:07
3.	"The trees they grow high"	3:04
4.	"An Alarc'h" (The swan)	2:25
5.	"An Durzhunel" (The turtle dove)	3:23
6.	"Telenn Gwad / The Foggy Dew"	3:57
7.	"Pop Plinn"	3:37
8.	"Tha mi sgith"	4:22
9.	"The King of the Fairies"	3:20
10.	"Tri Martolod"	4:27
11.	"Kost ar c'hoad"	3:54
12.	"Suite Sudarmoricaine"	3:29

Lyrics and musics are traditionals arranged by Alan Stivell except "The Wind of Keltia" written by Alan Stivell and Steve Waring.

== Personnel ==
=== Musicians ===
- Alan Stivell – lead vocal, Celtic harp, tin whistle (Irish flute), bombard
- Gabriel Yacoub – guitars, dulcimer, banjo, backing vocals
- René Werneer – fiddle
- Pascal Stive – organ
- Gérard Levasseur – bass
- Henry Delagarde – cello, flute, bombard
- Dan Ar Braz – electric guitar
- Michel Santangeli (29 August 1945–30 September 2014) – drums
- Serj Parayre – percussions
- Mikael Klec'h – flute, bombard

=== Recording ===
- Producer – Frank Giboni for Fontana Records
- Engineer – Paul Houdebine
- Engineer Assistant – Henri Lousteau

== Discography ==
Fontana 6399 005 [original French release]
Fontana 6325 321 [France, Italy]
Disques Dreyfus 834-289-2 [French CD release of 1988]

== Certifications ==
Region	Certification	Certified units/sales
France (SNEP)	2× Gold	200,000^{*}
^{*} Sales figures based on certification alone.
