= Marion du Faouët =

Leader of a group of highwaymen in Brittany

- Born: Marie-Louise Tromel; May 6, 1717
- Died: August 2, 1755 (aged 38)
- Occupation: bandit leader
- Years active: 1743-1755

Marie-Louise Tromel, better known as Marion du Faouët or Marie Finefont, born on May 6, 1717, was the leader of a group of highwaymen who were active near Le Faouët, Morbihan, Brittany. She was arrested four times, and once hanged in effigy. She was finally executed August 2, 1755. After her death, she was remembered as an infamous Breton.

== Biography ==
Marion was born to Félicien Tromel and Hélène Kerleau on May 6, 1717, in the hamlet of Porz-en-Haie, near Le Faouët, Morbihan. She was the third child of five, with two older brothers, François (1712) and Corentin, then a younger sister Louise (1719) and a younger brother René-Félicien (1721).

In 1737, at the age of twenty, Marion had her first child of four with Henri Pezron, a servant at Guéméné.

The first records of her criminal activity date from 1743. A master tailor, François Hellou, was attacked on the road to Priziac by a band of criminals, armed with sticks and pistols. He identified Henri Pezron and Marion's brother Corentin among his attackers. The same year, Marion was caught giving counterfeit coins to a man called Le Parlouer at the Croisty fair. This was when she was given the nicknames Marion du Faouët and Marie Finefont ("Finefont" meaning, in Breton, very cunning). It was not long after this that Marion became the leader of the emerging group of bandits: the latest year attested for her leadership therein is 1745.

Brice Evain describes the group as pragmatically targeting craftsmen, merchants, and well-to-do peasants, but not the nobility, whose victimisation was more likely to bring more serious consequences. The official website for tourism in Brittany, however, describes her as "a kind of Breton Robin Hood who robbed from the rich to give to the poor."

In 1746, Marion du Faouët, Henri Pezron, and their associates were arrested. Henri Pezron was hanged. Marion du Faouët was beaten, branded with a V (for voleur, "thief"), and banned from Rennes. Nonetheless, she returned to Faouët and assembled a new bandit troupe. Arrested again in 1748, she was again banished, this time from the whole province. Again, nonetheless, she returned to Faouët, and raised a new troupe.

Brice Evain calls the years 1748-1752 "the golden age of the troupe" (l’âge d’or de la troupe): they refined their skills as highwaymen, specializing in attacking traders returning from fairs, especially foreign traders.

In 1752, Marion was arrested in Poullaouen and taken to the prison in Quimper, from which she escaped. In 1753, she was hanged in effigy. In October 1754, she was arrested in Nantes, and taken to the prison in Bouffay. During questioning, she gave her name as Marion du Faouët; recognizing her, the judges transferred her to the prison in Quimper. This time, she did not escape: she was sentenced to hanging, and was executed August 2, 1755, at the age of thirty-eight.

== In popular culture ==
Marion became a legendary figure in Breton oral traditions after her death. Over time, she came to function as a bogeyman used by parents to frighten children into good behavior.

These were first recorded by the historian Julien Trévédy in 1884, in Breton Studies: Marion du Faouët, leader of thieves (Etudes Bretonnes: Marion du Faouët, chef de voleurs (1715-1755)). He says that he was going through the papers of the Quimper prison, researching something else, when he saw Marion's name and was vividly reminded of the legendary figure he had heard of growing up, thus prompting a new line of research into her life. The next work on Marion was Jean Lorédan's Poverty and thieves in the 18th century: Marion du Faouët and her "associates" (La grande misère et les voleurs au XVIIIe siècle : Marion du Faouët et ses «associés»), published in 1910.

In 1975, Colette Cosnier (fr) wrote a play casting Marion as a feminist hero, presenting an idea of Breton womanhood that was the opposite of the famously silent, obedient figure of Bécassine. The play was titled "Marion du Faouët/The strumpet with red hair" ("Marion du Faouët/La catin aux cheveux rouges").

In 1997, a two-part TV movie of her life was made in France, Marion du Faouët: Chef des Voleurs (Marion du Faouët: Leader of Thieves), starring Carole Richert as Marion.

In 2009, Marion was the subject of the song "Marionig" on Alan Stivell's album Emerald.

In 2013, Marion du Faouët was one of nine women featured in a campaign in Rennes with the slogan "Too few streets are named after women" (Trop peu de rues portent un nom de femmes): Marion was proposed as a notable Breton who deserved to be memorialized. The Coeur de Bretagne ("Heart of Brittany") travel listing for Le Faouët names Marion as the area's major historical figure.
