= Celtic Symphony =

Celtic Symphony may refer to

- Celtic Symphony for strings and six harps, a 1940 symphony by Granville Bantock
- Symphonie Celtique, a 1980 folk-rock album by Alan Stivell
- Celtic Symphony, a Wolfe Tones song, written for the centennial of Celtic Football Club in 1987
