= In Dublin =

In Dublin may refer to:

- In Dublin (album), a 1975 album by Alan Stivell
- In Dublin (magazine), a magazine in Dublin established in 1976
