= Carole Richert =

French actress (born 1967)

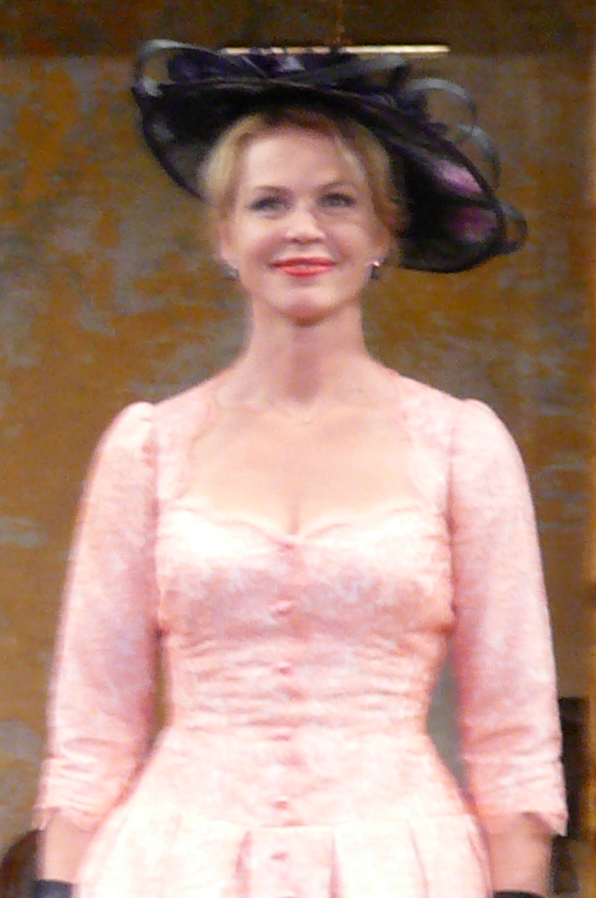
- Richert in 2019
- Born: 28 September 1967 (age 57); Strasbourg, France
- Occupation: Actor
- Spouse: Daniel Rialet (m. 2003; died 2006)
- Children: 2

Carole Richert (born 28 September 1967) is a French actress. She studied at the National Conservatory of Dramatic Arts in Paris. She played Marie-France in the series Clem, broadcast on TF1.

== Personal life ==
Richert married her husband Daniel Rialet on 18 June 2003, with whom she has two children: Pauline, born in 1996 and Vincent, born in 2000. Rialet died of a heart attack on April 11, 2006 at the age of forty-six.

== Filmography ==
=== Films ===
Year	Title	Role
1991	Cherokee	Jenny
1991	Tous les matins du monde	Toinette
1992	IP5	Sophie
1994	The Night and the Moment	Armande
1994	M. Foudamour, la lune promise	Gloria
1995	L'Année Juliette	
1996	Le Bel Été 1914	Denise
2000	Six-Pack	Hélène Moulinier
2001	L'Année Juliette	Irène
2007	Trois amis	Patricia
2008	Le Nouveau Protocole	
2009	J'ai kidnappé Plastic Bertrand	

=== Television ===
Year	Title	Role
1992	Papa veut pas que je t'épouse	Léa Schmulevitz
1993	Charlemagne, le prince à cheval	Himiltrude
1994	Les Nuiteux	Sylvie Roy
1995	L'Enfant en héritage	Cécile Gutman/Christina Schomberg
1995	La Rivière Espérance	Marie Paradou
1997	Marion du Faouët	Marion du Faouët
1998	Un cadeau, la vie!	Geneviève Lesage
1998	Tous les papas ne font pas pipi debout	Zoé
2002	Amant de mes rêves	Julie
2002	Un week-end pour le dire	Elsa
2002	On n'a plus de sushis à se faire	Brigitte
2002	Maigret	madame Gastin
2003	Le Premier Fils	Charlotte
2003	Je hais les enfants	Florence
2003	Louis Page	Gabrielle
2004	Bonhomme de chemin	Félicie
2004	Julie, chevalier de Maupin	Marthe Le Rochois
2004	Colette, une femme libre	Isabelle
2004	Penn sardines	Jeanne Le Meur
2004	Le temps des cerises	Tina Lavoisier
2005	Allons petits enfants	Adèle Lacorre
2005	Le Mystère Alexia	Sandrine Jacot
2005	L'Empire du Tigre	Janine
2005	Dalida	Solange
2006	Mariés... ou presque !	Dominique
2006	La Blonde au bois dormant	Nathalie Binet
2006	Petits Secrets et Gros Mensonges	Karine
2006	Je hais les parents	Florence
2007	Je hais les vacances	Florence
2007	Le Fantôme de mon ex	Chloé
2007	Sauveur Giordano	Margot
2008	Marie et Madeleine	Berthe Baron
2008	Une ombre derrière la porte	Camille
2009	Le Choix de Myriam	Denise
2010	Camping Paradis	Rachel Richet
2010	Le Roi, l'Écureuil et la Couleuvre	Madame de Sévigné
2010	La Maison des Rocheville	Clélia
2010-2013	Tango	Maryse
2010–present	Clem	Marie-France Brimont
