= Douar Nevez =

Studio album by Dan Ar Bras
- Released: 1977
- Recorded: 1977
- Genre: Celtic folk
- Label: Hexagone
- Producer: Hugues De Courson

Douar Nevez is a folk rock album by Dan Ar Bras. It was originally released as an LP in 1977 by Hexagone (WEA France), catalogue number 883 009. The album was produced by Hugues De Courson.

This was Ar Bras' first recording after his touring stint with Fairport Convention. He was assisted on bass by Fairport's Dave Pegg.

== Track listing ==
All tracks composed by Dan Ar Bras.

1. Intro
2. Retour De Guerre
3. Naissance De Dahud
4. Mort Et Immersion De Malguen / Fin Du Voyage
5. Naissance De La Ville
6. Morvac'h (Cheval de La Mer)
7. Orgies Nocturnes
8. L'Ennui Du Roi
9. Les Forces Du Mal
10. L'Appel Du Sage
11. Submersion De La Ville
12. Douar Nevez (Terre Nouvelle)

== Releases ==
- CD Douar Nevez Sony BMG 2006

== Personnel ==
- Dan Ar Bras - electric and acoustic guitars
- Patrig Molard - flute, bagpipes
- Benoît Widemann - keyboards
- Dave Pegg - bass
- Michel Santangeli - drums
- Marc Chantereau - percussion
