= Dalida (2005 film) =

Dalida is a 2005 French-Italian two-part television film directed by Joyce Buñuel. The film is about the life of Italian-French singer and actress Dalida.

== Plot ==
The series deals with French-Italian singer Dalida, from her birth to Italian parents in Cairo, Egypt, to her long and successful singing career in Europe, Asia, America and Africa, until her tragic death in Paris, France.

== Cast ==
- Sabrina Ferilli as Iolanda Cristina Gigliotti, also known as Dalida
- Charles Berling as Lucien Morisse
- Michel Jonasz as Bruno Coquatrix
- Christopher Lambert as Richard Chanfray
- Arnaud Giovaninetti as Bruno / Orlando
- Alessandro Gassman as Luigi Tenco
- Fanny Gilles as Rosy
- Vincent Lecœur as Jean Sobieski
- Carole Richert as Solange
- Stephan Spassov as Claudio
- Fabrice Deville as Eddie Barclay
- Marie-Noëlle Bordeaux as Peppina
- Guillaume Adam as The receptionist
- Roberto Bestazzoni as Mario, an Italian producer
- Jeff Bigot as journalist at the wedding
- Bruno Delahaye as The casting director
- Maria Ducceschi as Andréa
- Silvana Gasparini as Dalida's sister-in-law
- Nabil Massad as Matouk
- Patrick Massiah as Orlando the Elder
- Solange Milhaud as The maid in Ankara
- Laurent Olmedo as Paulo de Sena
- Laurent Savard as The taxi driver
- Nikolai Urumov as Pietro Gilliotti
- Eric Verdin as Pascal Sevran
- Pascal Lopez as The bar man
