= AMzer: Seasons =

Studio album by Alan Stivell
- Released: 2 October 2015
- Recorded: 2014 – Rennes (Brittany)
- Genre: Celtic music – Celtic fusion Electropop – Neofolk
- Length: 54:41 (+ 13:07 = 67:48)
- Label: WorldVillage / Harmonia Mundi
- Producer: Alan Stivell

Alan Stivell chronology
Emerald (2009)	AMzer: Seasons (2015)

AMzer – Seasons is the 24th album by Breton musician Alan Stivell, released on 2 October 2015 through WorldVillage in France and other countries. "NEw' AMzer" was the first single to be released from it. This track was also released as a promotional video.

By using the Breton expression an amzer evoking the weather and the passing of time, Stivell brings a perspective to the evolution of the world, half a century after his recording debuts, and particularly to the technical progress, by playing on a new electric Celtic harp, served with modern effects.

It is a tribute to the time inspired by the change of seasons, supported by a sound design where vocals, flutes and percussions build the mould for some contemplative music, somewhere between avant-folk and a kind of innovative electronic approach. The lyrics are poems in relation to the nature and the seasons, sometimes old as the Japanese haiku or new as a Breton teenager's poem.

The album is also available as a "Leclerc limited edition" including 3 bonus tracks (2 alternative mixes and a brand new instrumental) and a 60-page booklet.

== Overview ==
AMzer: Seasons marks the passing of time and the 50th anniversary of Stivell's career.

With AMzer: Seasons, Stivell pursues his quest of a "global music" and timeless, with an attraction for all the musics, in the space and the time: "Underpinning this record, I was wanting peace and fullness". The title in Breton language evokes the time and the subtitle the seasons. By dedicating this concept-album to poetry, he gets closer his Trema 'n Inis: Towards The Isle studio album released about 40 years ago, in 1976. His Celtic music goes to the contact of the other cultures and for the first time, the artist opens to the Japanese culture, by presenting three Japanese poets from the 17th to the 19th centuries (Kobayashi Issa, Yosa Buson, Matsuo Bashô) wrote these airy haiku. He continues to lead his experimental musical research, in connection with technological development. For three years he worked in his studio pure, archaic and futuristic sounds. The set can be subsumed into current "electropop-folk" trends.

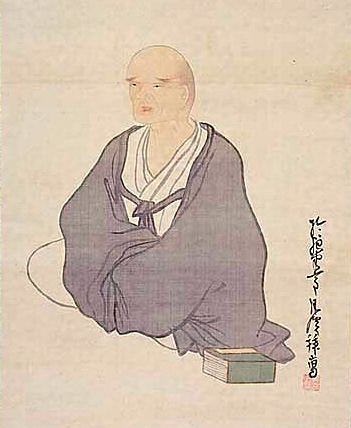
Yosa Buson

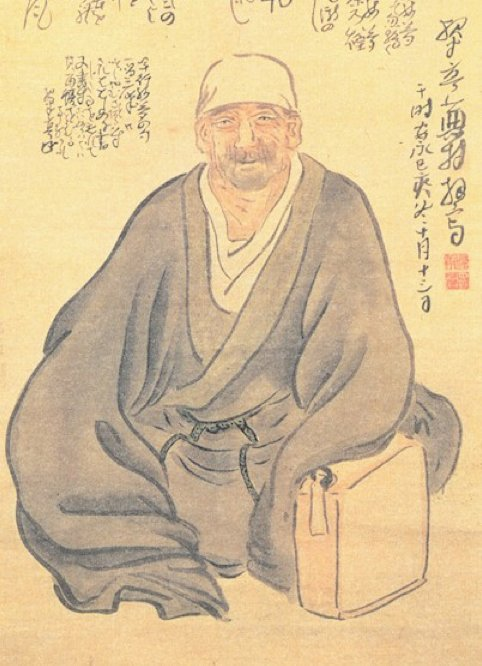
Matsuo Bashō

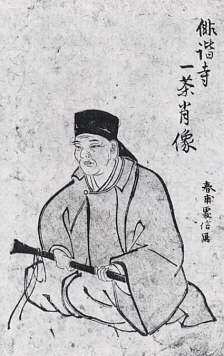
Kobayashi Issa

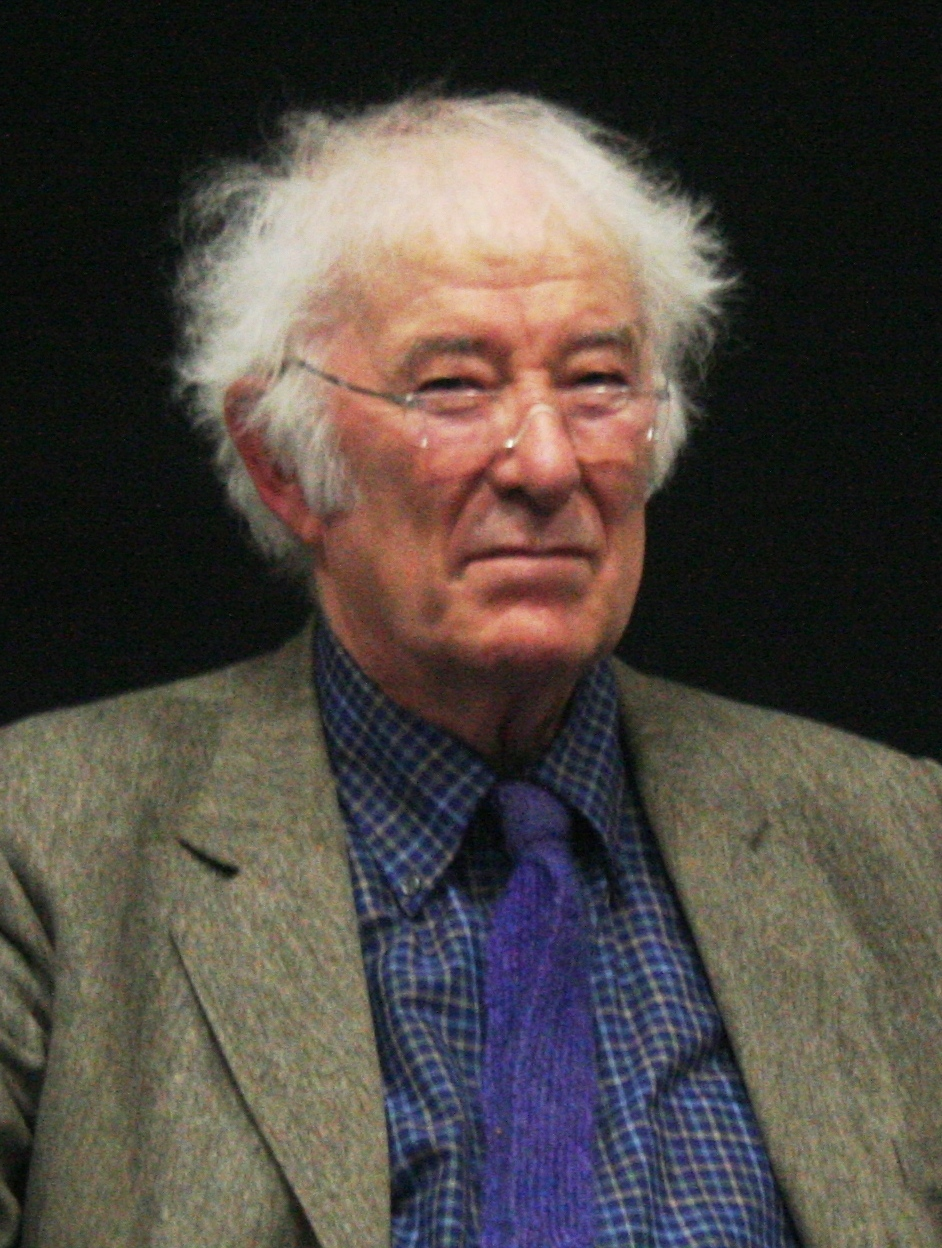
Seamus Heaney

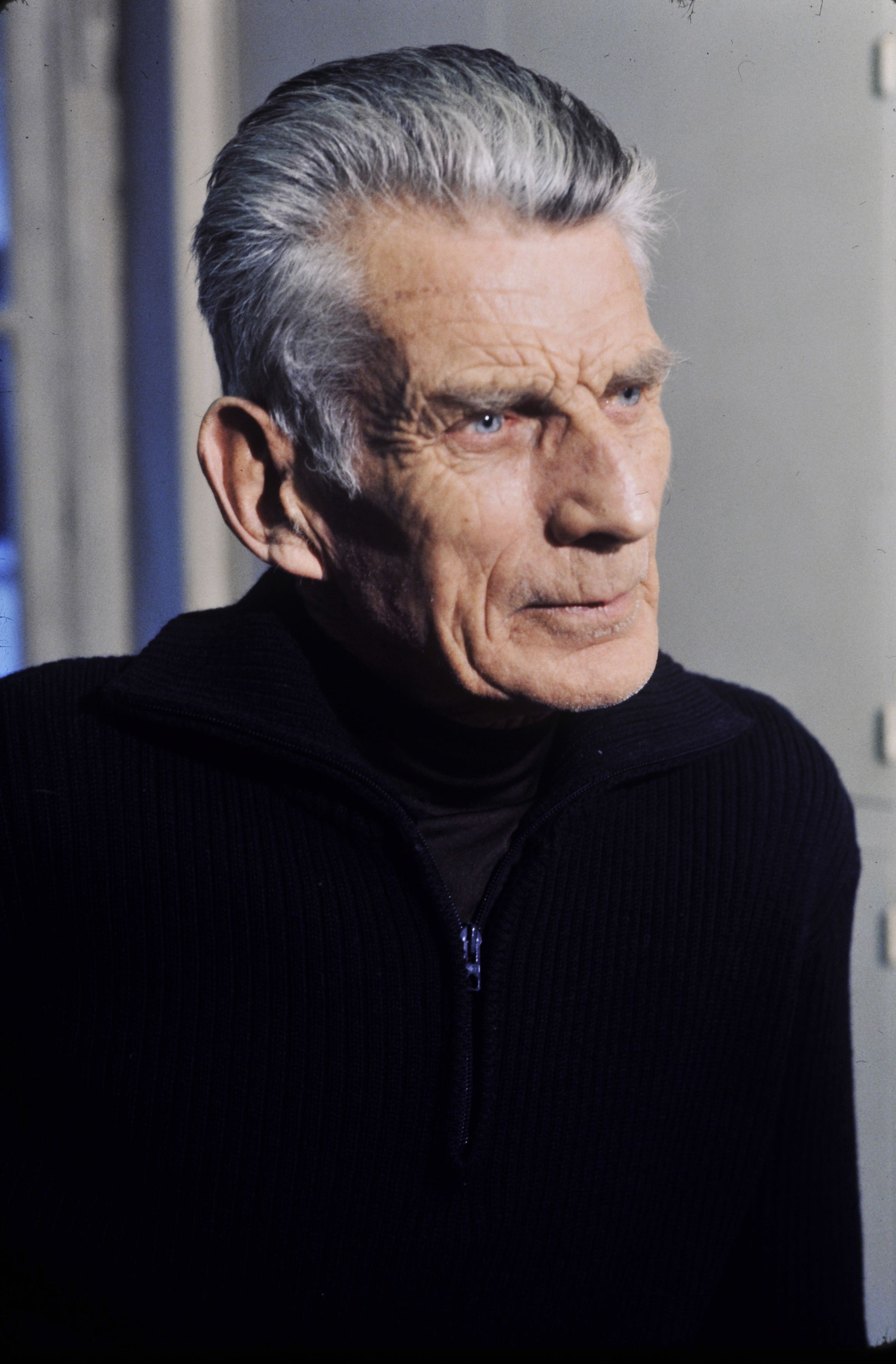
Samuel Beckett

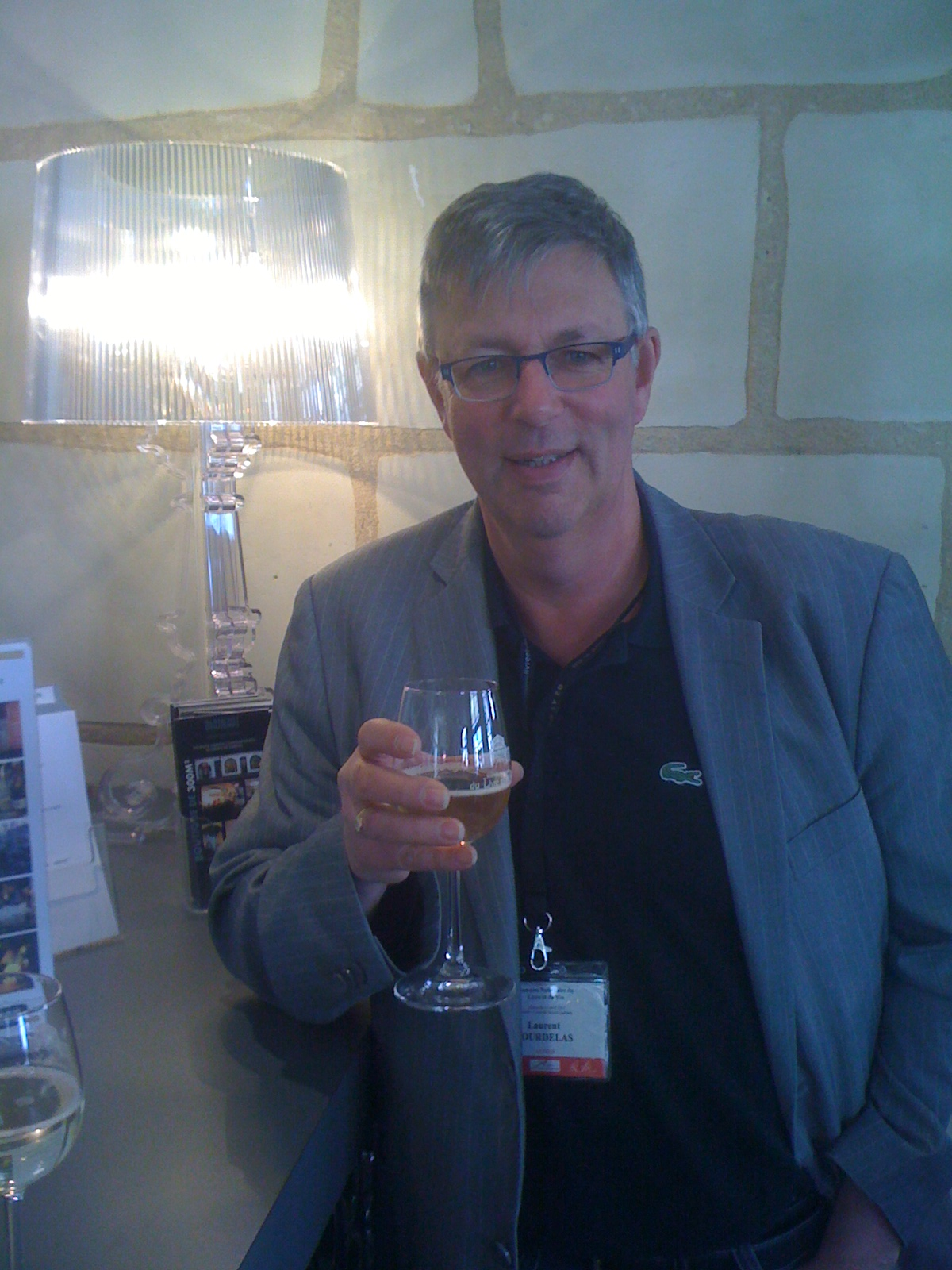
Laurent Bourdelas

== Sound design ==
« All the themes on this album were built around my harp and my voice. These are just improvisations, serving as a basis for computer-assisted "deconstructed-reconstructed" reworking, using new or little-used techniques whether electronic or in playing the harp. I want to make listeners think of anything but a harp: the sound of an acoustic bass, of an electric guitar; but also of other sounds totally distorted and experimental, concocted notably by David Millemann and also Nicolas Pougnand (some used in tracks 1, 2, 5, 10, 13). Or the sound of a piano, a synthesiser and so on, led by the harp, using the systems Audio-to-midi (for example in 1). I also use these interfaces for my voice, along with synthesisers (8). » Alan Stivell, text p. 11.

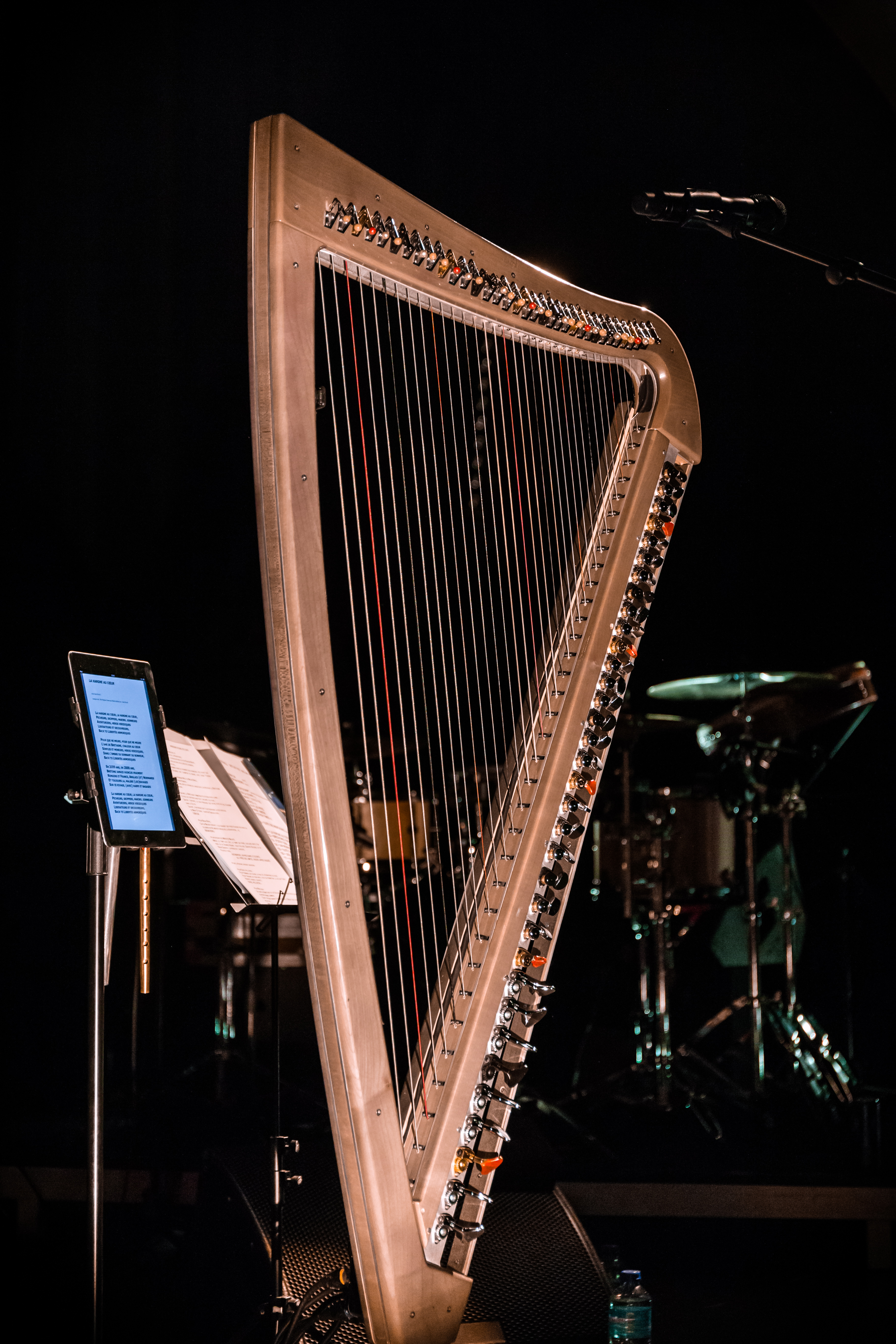
Electric harp Stivell-Marceau (2013)

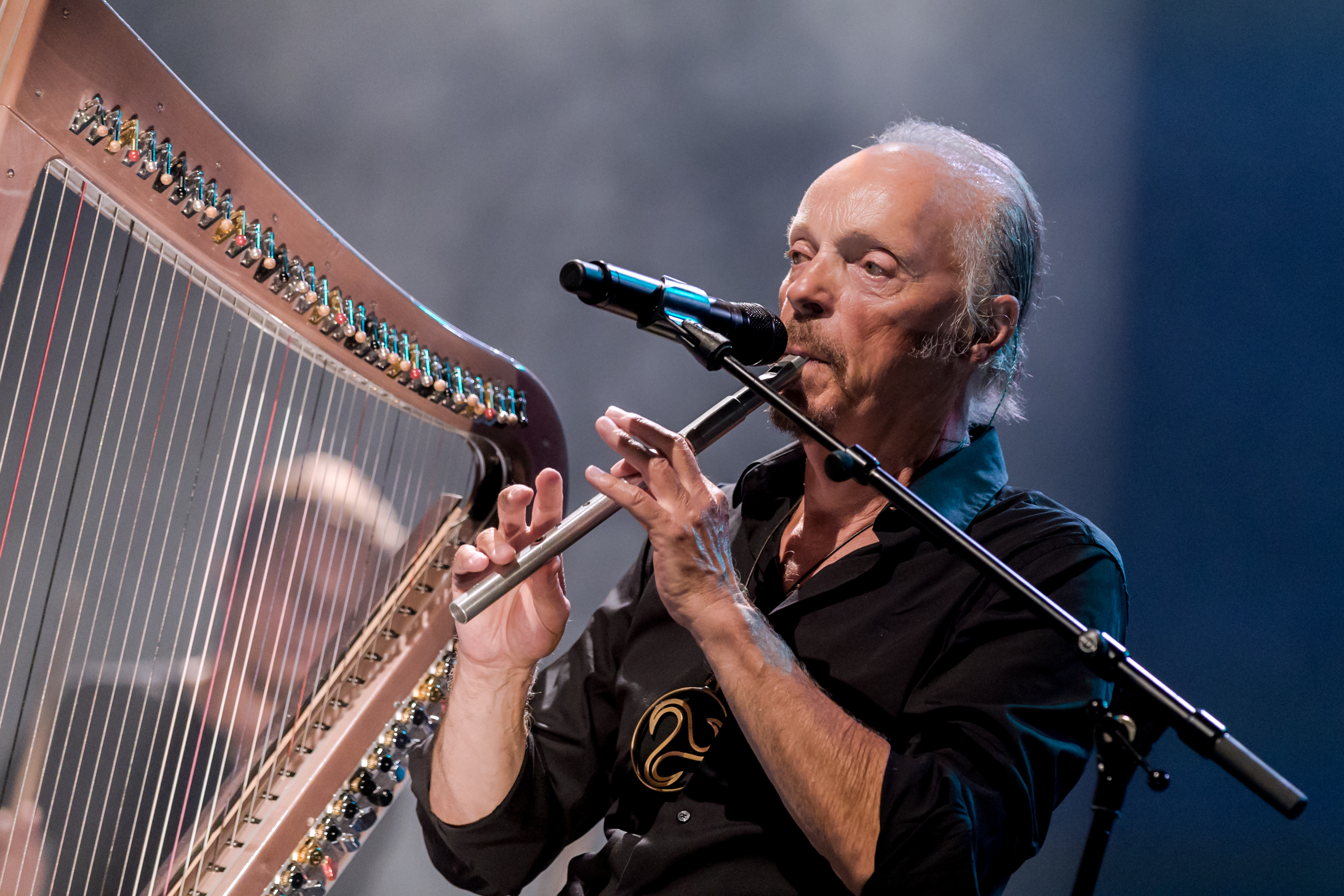
Alan Stivell

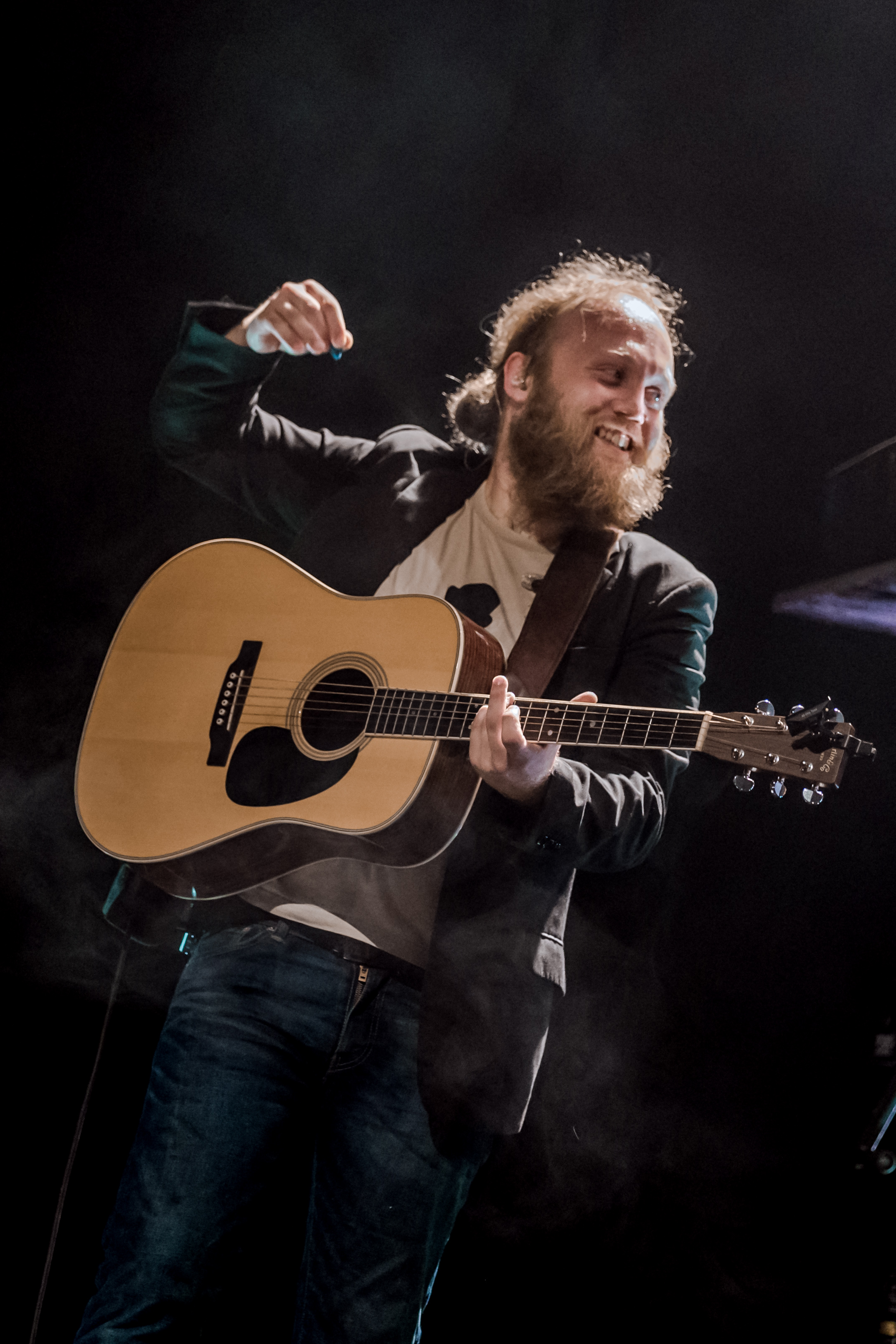
David Millemann

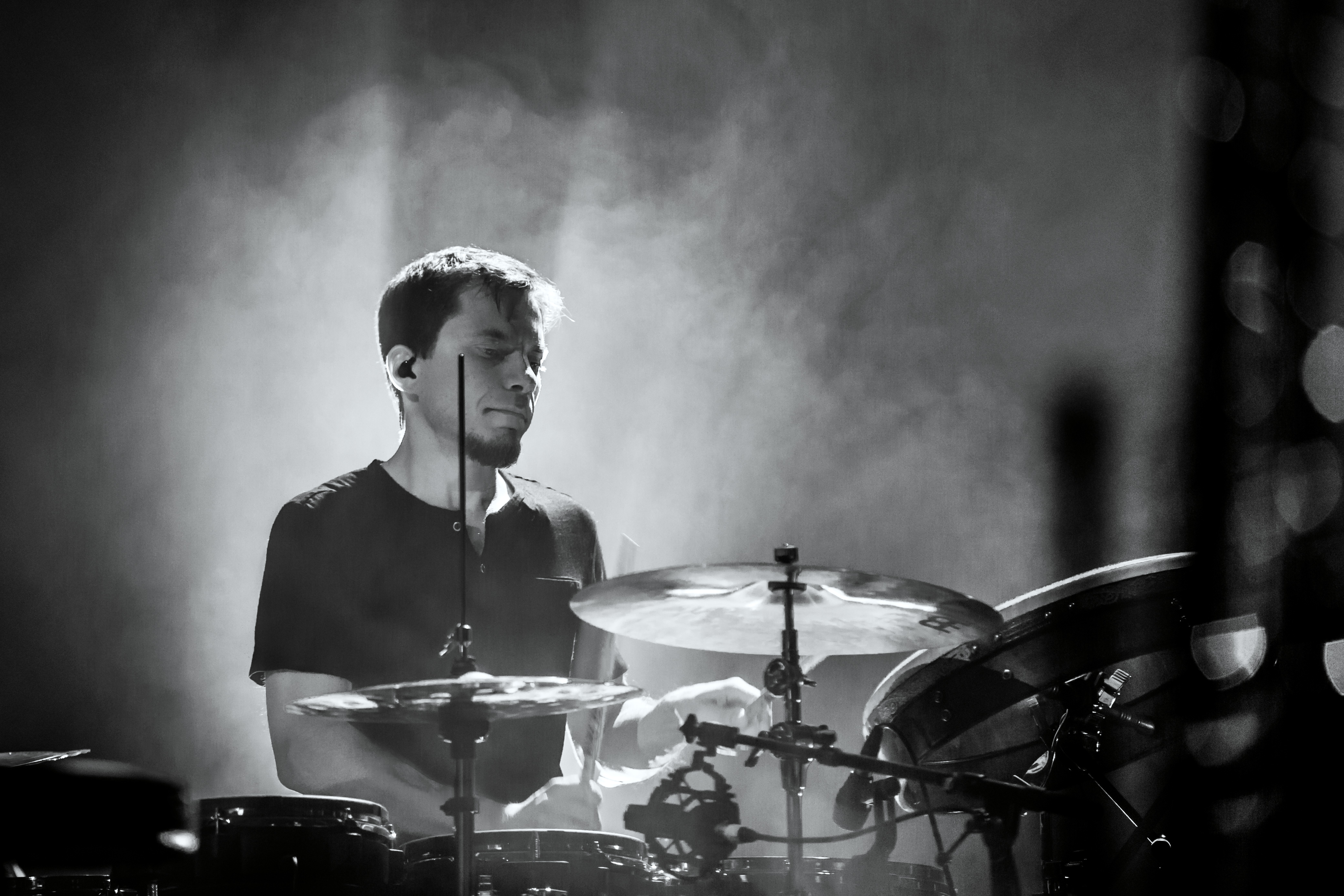
Nicolas Hild

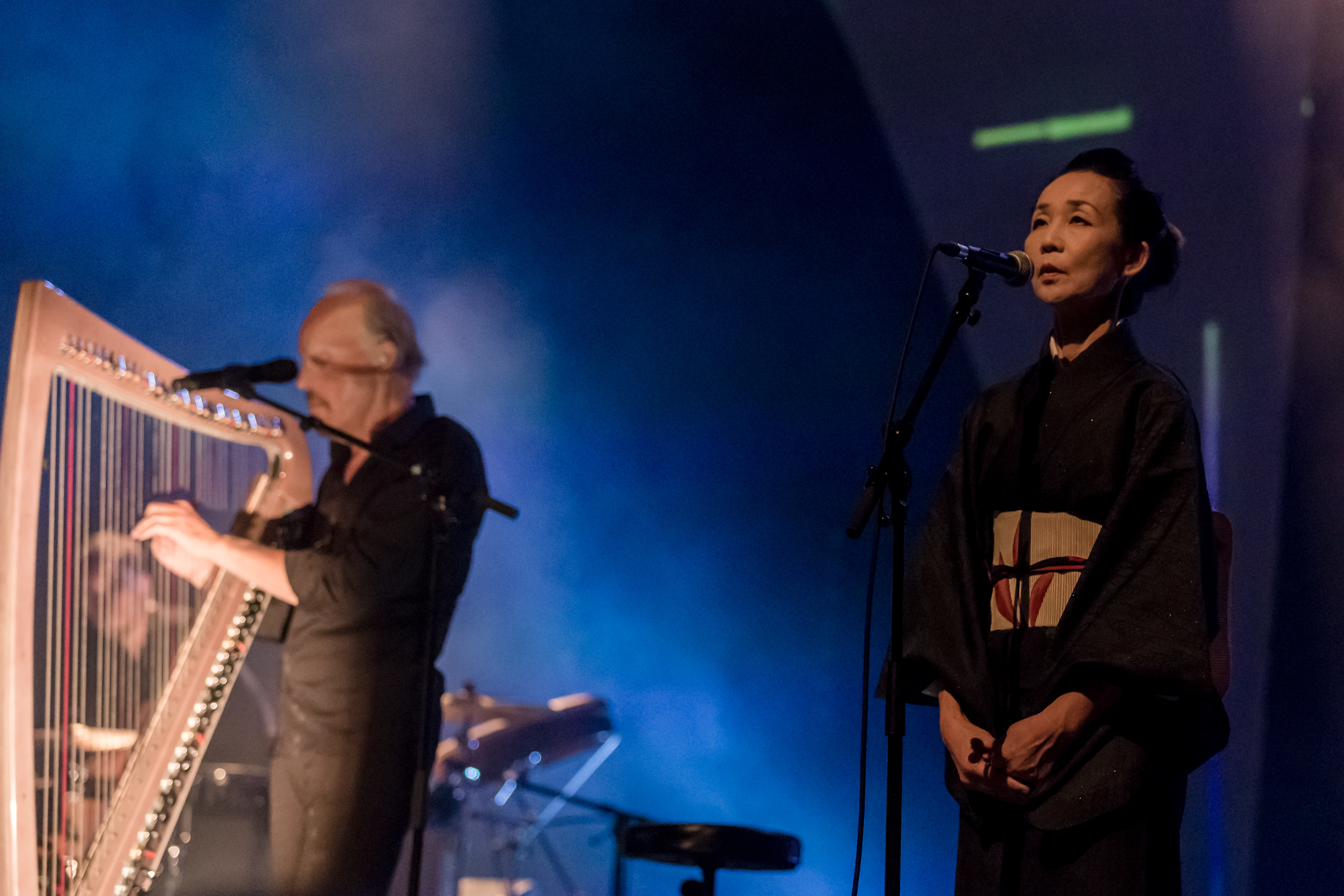
Maliko Oka

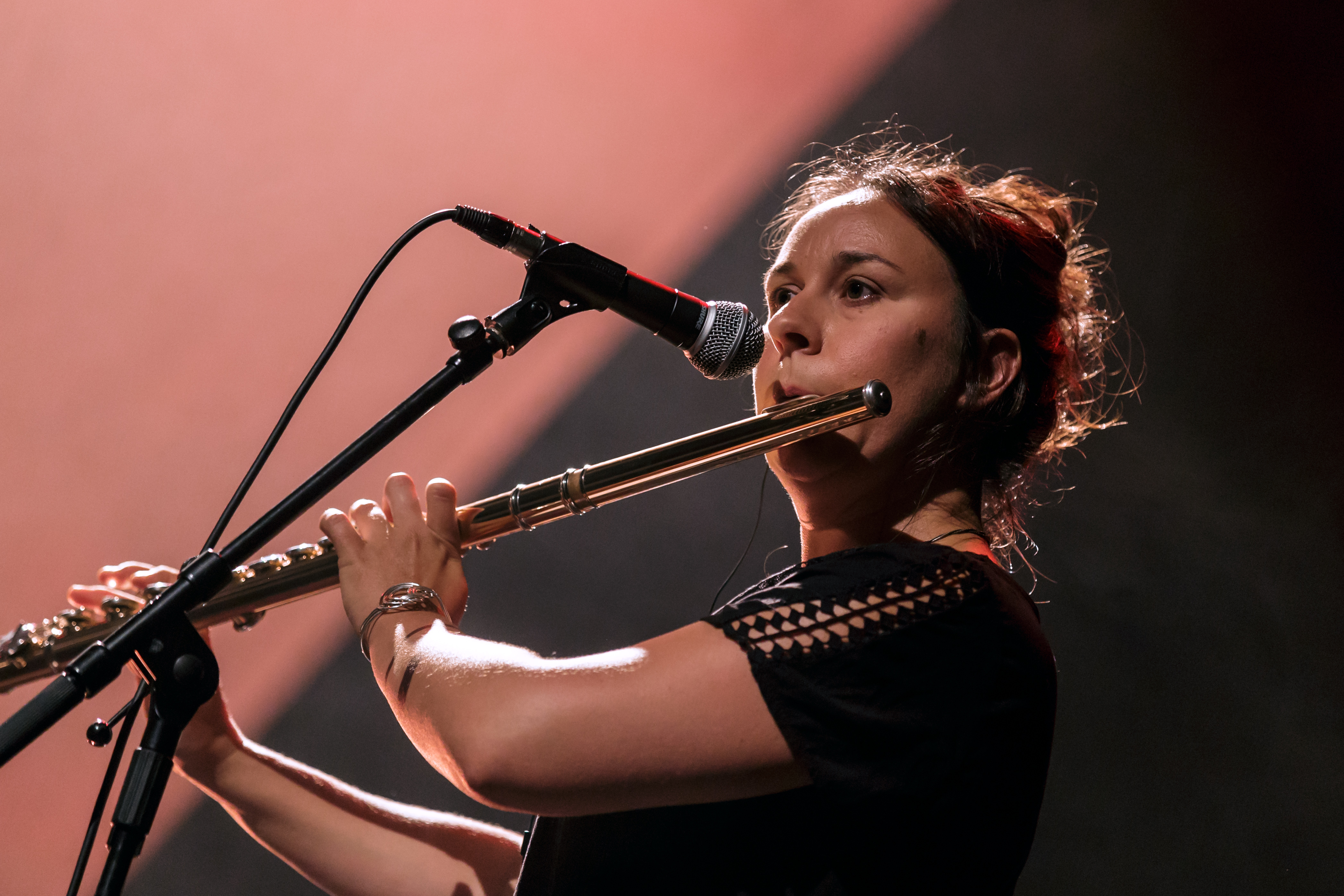
Anne Gwenn Brodu

== Track listing ==
=== Standard album ===
All music is composed by Alan Stivell

No.	Title	Writer(s)	Length
1.	"NEw' AMzer" (Spring)	Kentin Bleuzen	4:44
2.	"Other Times – AmZErioù all" (Haïku de printemps 1)	old poem	3:15
3.	"Matin de printemps – Kesa no haru" (Haïku de printemps 2)	Kobayashi Issa, Matsuo Bashô, Yosa Buson (adapted by Zeno Bianu and Corinne Atlan)	6:40
4.	"MINtin NEw' HAÑv" (Haïku de printemps 3)	old poem (adapted by Zeno Bianu, Corinne Atlan and Alan Stivell)	2:31
5.	"Au plus près des limites – Je marcherai" (An tostañ d'an harzoù – Near by the Bounds)	Bruno Geneste (adapted by Bruno Geneste and Alan Stivell)	5:15
6.	"Postscript"	Séamus Heaney	5:38
7.	"KAla GoAÑv – Calendes d'hiver" (As A Tribute 1 – electroacoustic experimental)		2:59
8.	"What Could I Do ?" (As A Tribute 2)	Alan Stivell	4:31
9.	"KErzu – December" (As A Tribute 3 – electro experimental)		5:19
10.	"Purple Moon"	Laurent Bourdelas	7:46
11.	"Halage"	Alan Stivell	2:51
12.	"Echu ar GoAÑv ? – Till Spring?"		3:12
Total length:			54:41

=== Bonus tracks ===
All music is composed by Alan Stivell

No.	Title	Writer(s)	Length
13.	"NEw' AMzer" (alternative mix)	Kentin Bleuzen	4:50
14.	"What could I do ?" (As A Tribute 2 – alternative mix)		3:59
15.	"En Enor da Séamus" (Ó hÉannaí – harp solo instrumental)		4:18
Total length:			67:48

== Personnel ==
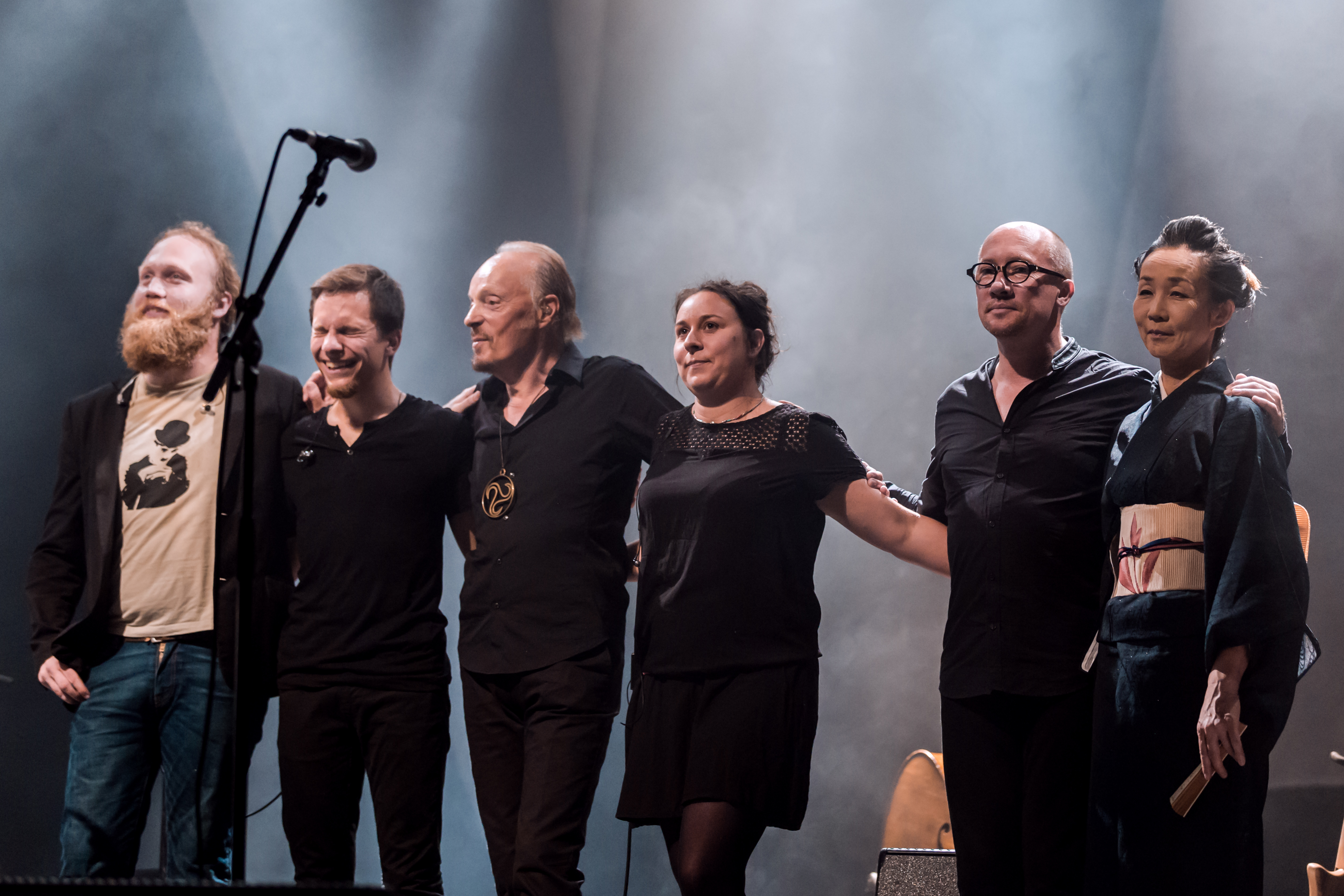
D. Millemann, N. Hild, A. Stivell, A.G. Brodu, C. Alexandre, M. Oka

- Alan Stivell : programs, vocals, harps, tin and low-whistle
- Cédrick Alexandre : double bass (5)
- Anne Gwen Brodu : classic and wood flutes (7,8)
- Toshiko Dhotel : Nippon talking vocals (2)
- Gaëtan Grandjean : acoustic guitar (9)
- Nicolas Hild : percussions, machines (5,7,8)
- David Millemann : guitars, sound design and programs (2,3,4,8,9,11)
- Maliko Oka : Nippon talking vocals and advices (2,3)
- Gráinne O'Malley : Irish vocals (6)
- Véronique Piron : master of shakuhachi, percussions (3,5)
- Nicolas Pougnand : sound design (1,2,5,10)
- Loumi Seveno : alto (9)

== Credits ==
- Recording: from November 2011 to November 2014 at Studio Keltia III (Betton, Brittany) by Stivell; January 30, 31 2013 at Studio Zitello (Sulbiate, Lombardia) by Vincenzo Zitello (1, 5, 12, 13); from October 2014 to December 2014 at Studio Tillaut (Chevaigné, Brittany) by Damien Tillaut.
- Directed by Alan Stivell
- Mix: in January and February 2015 at Studio Tillaut (Chevaigné, Brittany) by Damien Tillaut and Alan Stivell, except 7, 8, 9, 13 from December 2014 to February 2015 at La Licorne Rouge (Rennes, Brittany) by Ted Beauvarlet, David Millemann and Alan Stivell.
- Mastering: in January and March 2015 at Translab (Paris) by Benj.
- Artwork: Ballmap (2011) by Jérémie Brunet.

== Charts ==
Chart (2015)	Peak position
French Albums (SNEP)	56

== See also ==
=== External links ===
- Official website
