= Pop Plinn =

Pop-Plinn is a traditional air of a Breton dance transformed into pop music by Alan Stivell. The "Dañs Plinn" is a fast and physical dance where the dancer makes two small jumps by holding the arm of his neighbors.

Alan Stivell signed for a long time about a footbridge between these two worlds, the folk rock Anglo-Saxon music and the Breton-Celtic music. Thus he gave rise to the Celtic rock.

== History ==
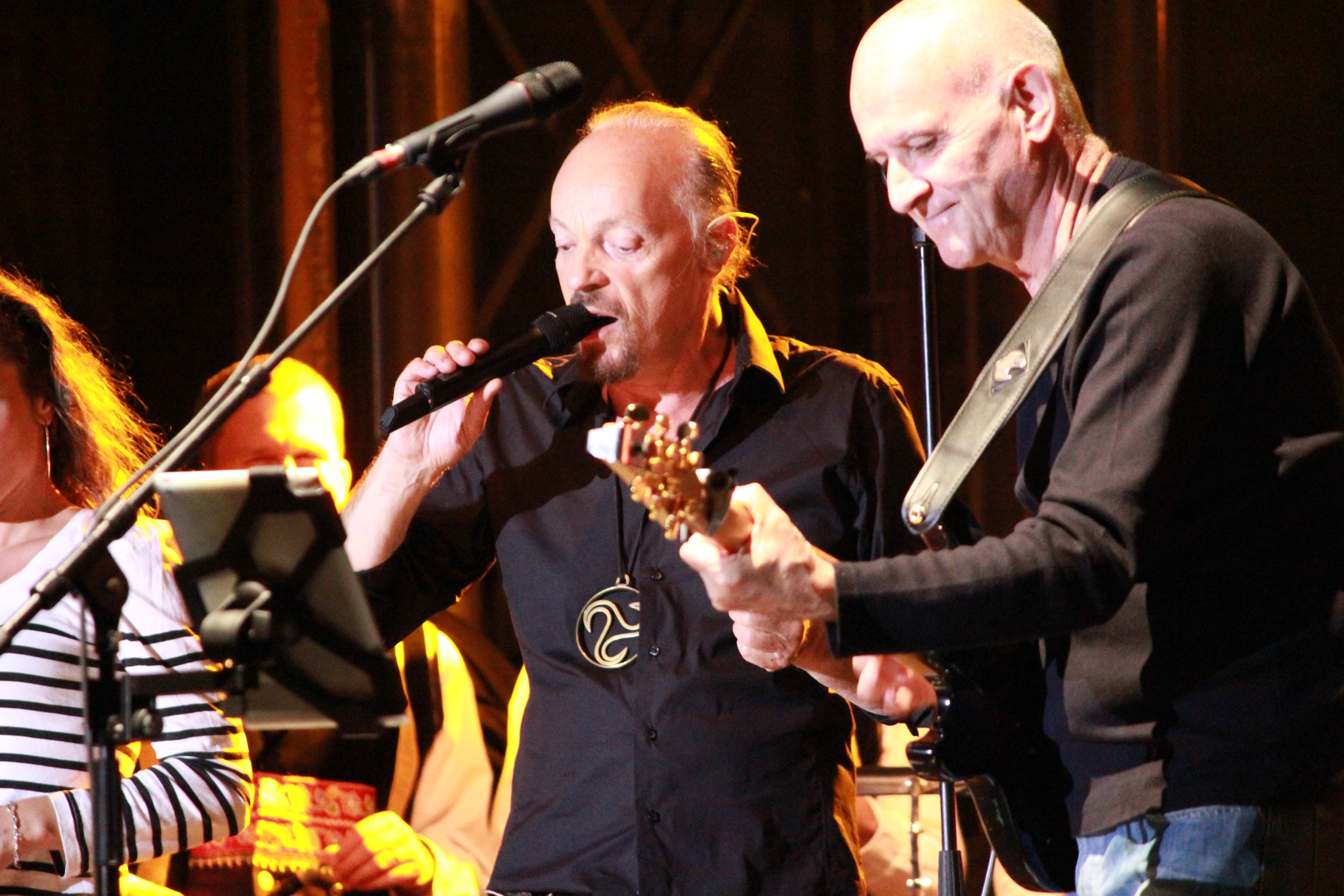
Alan Stivell and Dan ar Braz at the electric guitar.

The release of the single in late 1971 and early 1972 causes an electroshock. For the first time, the world discovers the electric guitar playing the Breton traditional music arranged in a pop way and the Breton auditor becomes aware that its music can be modern and appreciated by the others. This composition is programmed in radio and even used for a jingle of a broadcast of Europe 1 radio.

The record contrasts with the almost simultaneous release of his instrumental album in the classic Celtic accents, the Renaissance of the Celtic Harp. By reaching a broad audience, after the passage of the artist in the mythical Parisian Olympia music hall on February 28, 1972, Pop Plinn upsets preconceived ideas, with an important distribution in France. The talent of guitarists Dan ar Braz expresses himself in his solos, playing the music theme, but the music reminder also the folk music using traditional instruments (harp, bombard, percussion).

== Links ==
- Pop Plinn in 1972
- Pop Plinn in 1999 by Alan Stivell, Dan Ar Braz and l'Héritage des Celtes
- Covers on WhoSampled
