= Chemins de Terre =

Studio album by Alan Stivell
- Released: 1973
- Studio: Studio Hérouville
- Genre: Celtic rock, Celtic folk, folk rock
- Label: Fontana; Vertigo
- Producer: Franck Giboni

Alan Stivell chronology
À l'Olympia (1972)	Chemins de Terre (1973)	E Langonned (1974)

Chemins de Terre is a folk rock album by Alan Stivell, originally released in 1973. It was produced by Franck Giboni. It was retitled From Celtic Roots... in the United Kingdom and Celtic Rock in Germany.

== Track listing ==
- All selections traditional; arranged by Alan Stivell; except where indicated
1. "Susy MacGuire" 3:35
2. "Ian Morrison Reel" 4:09 (Peter McLeod, arranged by Alan Stivell)
3. "She Moved Through The Fair" 4:13
4. "Can Y Melinydd" 1:59
5. "Oidhche Mhaith" 1:53
6. "An Dro Nevez" 3:45
7. "Maro e Ma Mestrez" 3:08
8. "Brezhoneg' Raok" 3:08 (Alan Stivell)
9. "An Hani a Garan" 4:11
10. "Metig" 4:07
11. "Kimiad" 3:34

== Personnel ==
- Alan Stivell - Celtic harp, vocals, Scottish bagpipes, whistle, mellotron, timbales, harmonium
- Gabriel Yacoub - acoustic guitar, banjo, dulcimer, psaltery, vocal
- René Werneer - fiddle, vocals
- Pascal Stive - organ, piano
- Jean-Luc Hallereau - bass, vocal
- Dan Ar Bras - electric and acoustic guitars, vocal
- Michel Santangelli - drums
- Marie Yacoub - spoons, vocals
- Elyane Werneer, Mireille Werneer - vocals
- Michel Delaporte - tablas

with

- (Breton pipe band) Bagad Bleimor - bagpipes, bombardes, Scottish drums
