= In Dublin (album) =

Live album by Alan Stivell
- Released: Spring 1975
- Recorded: 26 and 27 November 1974, National Stadium, Dublin
- Genre: Folk rock
- Label: Fontana
- Producer: Alan Stivell, Peter Rice

In Dublin is a folk/rock album by Alan Stivell, recorded live at the National Stadium, Dublin, on 26 and 27 November 1974, and originally released in Spring 1975.

The album was produced by Alan Stivell and Peter Rice for Keltia III. It was recorded by Frank Owen on the Island Mobile, and mixed by Howard Kilgour at Island Studios. The original LP release (in the UK, Fontana 9299 547) was cut at Apple Studios, with sleeve photography by Roy Esmonde and Ian Gwenic and design by Alain Batifoulier and Blandine Durand. Packaged with the original LP was a poster drawn by Irish artist Jim Fitzpatrick.

Professional ratings
Review scores
Source	Rating
AllMusic	3/5 stars

== Track listing ==
1. "Spered Hollvedel" (Universal Spirit) (Traditional; arranged by Stivell)
2. "Delivrance" (Deliverance) (Stivell)
3. "Ha Kompren't 'vin Erfin" (Shall I Be Understood At Last?) (Stivell)
4. "Tenwal Eo'r Bed" (The World Is Dark) (Words: Erwan Evenou, Music: Traditional; arranged by Stivell)
5. "Digor Eo An Hent" (The Road Is Clear) (Stivell)
6. "Debhair An Rinceoir" (Debhair The Dancer) / Jig Gwengamp (Traditional; arranged by Stivell)
7. "Pachpi Kozh" (Trad arr. Stivell) / Pachpi New' (Stivell)
8. "Laridenn / Maieseal O Neil" (Traditional; arranged by Stivell)
9. "Ton-Bale Pourled / Hanter-Drou Haou" (Traditional; arranged by Stivell)
10. "Bal Ha Dans Plinn" (Traditional; arranged by Stivell)
11. "An Droiou" (Traditional)

== Personnel ==
- Alan Stivell - vocals, Celtic harp, bombarde, Irish flute, Scottish bagpipes
- Dan Ar Bras - electric and acoustic guitars
- René Werneer - fiddle, dulcimer
- Pascal Stive - organ
- Michel Santangelli - drums
- Jacky Thomas - bass guitar
- Bagad Bleimor (the Breton Pipe Band Bleimor)
  - Alan Kloatr - transverse flute, Breton bagpipe, bombarde
  - Padrig Sicard - bombarde
  - Mik Ar Biz - bombarde
  - Dominique Mollard - Scottish drums and Irish drum
  - Patrig Mollard - Scottish Bagpipes
  - Pierre Mayel - Scottish Bagpipes
