= Symphonie Celtique =

Symphonie Celtique Celtic Symphony

Studio album by Alan Stivell
- Released: 1980
- Recorded: 1979
- Label: CBS, Rounder (CD 1987)
- Producer: Alan Stivell

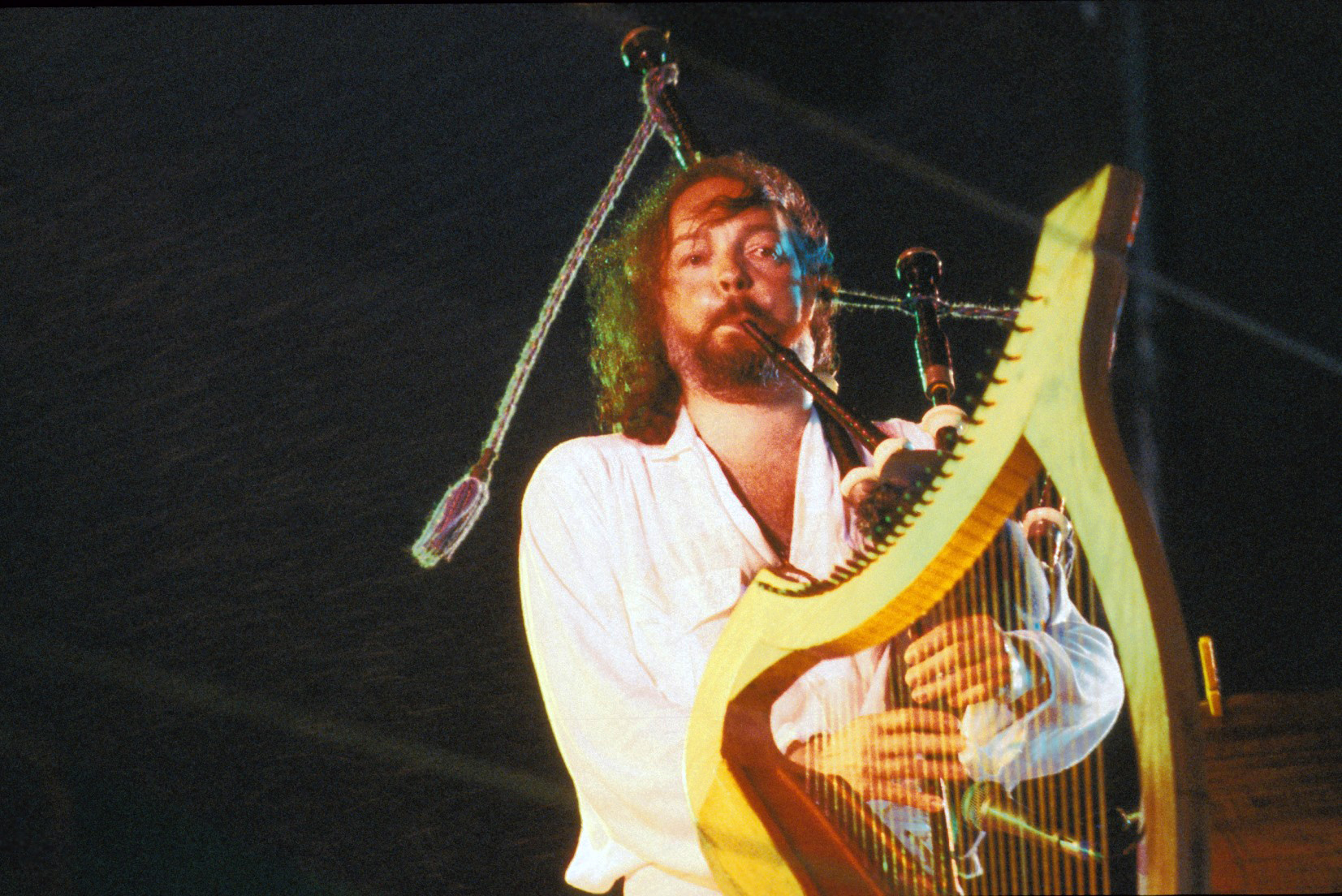
Alan Stivell with his "Celtic Symphony" in Lorient in 1980

Symphonie Celtique ("Celtic Symphony"), subtitled "Tir na nOg", a folk-rock album by Alan Stivell, originally released as a double LP in 1980 by CBS France, catalogue number CBS 88487. In 1987, it was published by Rounder Records in CD 11523. Digitally remastered and reissued on CD by Disques Dreyfus, catalogue number FDM 36196–2.

Composed entirely by Stivell, featuring instrumental arrangements by Stivell assisted by Christopher Hayward and Michel Prezman, and with over 70 musicians contributing, this was a large undertaking. As well as embracing the classic Stivell fare of Breton, Scottish and Irish instrumentation, this early nod at world music includes oriental and African sounds as well as a full orchestra and lavish production values. On the original vinyl release, the "three circle" symphonic construction was emphasised in the track listings to a greater extent than with the subsequent CD reissue.

The original double LP was packaged in a gatefold sleeve whose interior featured a still from the Roman Polanski film Tess depicting Stonehenge in the mist.

== Reception ==
Stivell, further back in France, reached a European then global reach. In Italy, class Stivell 52nd best rock musician of all time ("Best Rock Musicians of all times") in the "String / Wind" category. Italian free radio stations broadcast his music, which led him to play in the wake before 11,000 people in Rome and 14,000 in Milan. In Great Britain, Andy Morgan believes that "Stivell's early crative development reached a climax with the staging of his Symphonie Celtique. Is the ultimate expression of everything Stivell felt about his Celtic roots and their place in the wider cultural context."

== Track listing ==
This track listing is as presented on the sleeve of the original LP release; this differs slightly from that of the CD reissue. All music was composed by Alan Stivell.

1. KELC'H UNAN: First Circle (20:45)
  1. BEAJ d'an Ec'honderiou Diabarzh - voyage to our inner spaces
  2. HIRAEZH d'an Amser dremenet ha da-zoned - nostalgia for the past and the future
    1. "Gwerz 1" and "Loc'h ar Goulenn" - "Song 1" and "Profound lake that I interrogate"
  3. DIVODAN en Holl Veur - dissolution in the Great All
2. KELC'H DAOU: Second Circle (18:24)
  1. EMSKIANT newez tost d'ar Mann en Eil Bed kenstur - regaining consciousness near the Nothingness in the second parallel world
  2. KENDASKREN Gant an Hollved - vibratory communion with the universe
  3. IMRAM d'an Inisenn - in quest of the Isle
  4. DILESTRAN was Inis gWenva - landing on Blissful Isle, the isle of the Pure World, the third world (or the third life, that of perfection or harmony)
3. KELC'H TRI: Third Circle (33:15)
  1. AR C'HAMMOU KENTAÑ war an Inisenn - first steps on the Isle
  2. Kawadden AR GEODED SKEDUS: Tir Na Nóg - discovery of the Radiant City
  3. AR BALE TREMA 'R GEODED - the march towards the City
  4. GOUEL HOLLVEDEL - universal festival
  5. AN DISTRO trumm e-barzh ar Bed Keñverel ha Goulenn - sudden return to the relative and interrogative world

== Personnel ==
- Alan Stivell – vocals, harps, Scottish bagpipes, whistle, bombard
- Chris Hayward – flute, percussion
- Robby Finkel – keyboards
- Michel Prezman – keyboards
- Dominique Widiez – keyboards
- Marc Perru – guitars
- Mikael Valy – bass guitar
- Roger Secco – drums
- Padrig Kerre – fiddle, mandolin, bodhran
- Daniel Herve – uilleann pipes
- Marie-José Cochevelou – spoken word
- Maire Fenton – Irish vocal
- Uña Ramos – kena
- Narendra Bataju – sitar
- Mrs Bataju – tampura

with additional pipe/Bombard and drum bands, full orchestra, a choir directed by Christiane Legrand, and the Berber female vocal group DjurDjura.
