= Renaissance of the Celtic Harp =

Studio album by Alan Stivell
- Released: 1972
- Recorded: at Studio Des Dames, Paris by Paul Haudebinr & Philippe Lerichomme
- Genre: Celtic music / Celtic fusion New-age / World music Breton traditional music Irish traditional music Welsh traditional music Scottish traditional music Manx traditional music
- Length: 37:32
- Label: Fontana/Philips
- Producer: Franck Giboni

Alan Stivell chronology
Reflets (1970)	Renaissance of the Celtic Harp (1972)	À l'Olympia (1972)

Renaissance de la Harpe Celtique or Renaissance of the Celtic Harp is a 1972 record album by the Breton master of the Celtic harp Alan Stivell that revolutionised the connection between traditional folk music, modern rock music and world music.

== Significance ==
The release of this album with its fusion of classical, traditional folk and rock music, its mixture of instruments (cello, harp, electric guitar, traditional and modern drums) and its evocation of a utopian atmosphere and vision of humans in harmony with nature, immediately set it as a benchmark in the Celtic music revival of the 1970s.

The album influenced many harpists, Bretons like Myrdhin or Cécile Corbel but also Jo Morrison, Loreena McKennitt, Deborah Henson-Conant, Charles de Lint, Australian Robert Hart and Louisa John-Krol, Russian Anastasia Papisova, Italian Vincenzo Zitello, Norwegian Kristian Nordeide, New York musicians Steven Halpern and Ben Kettlewell. By the time of his second album, in one year, the number of harps sold in France had reached into the thousands.

Music critic Bruce Elder wrote:

People who hear this record are never the same again. Renaissance of the Celtic Harp, one of the most beautiful and haunting records ever made by anybody, introduced the Celtic harp to many thousands of listeners around the world. To call this music gorgeous and ravishing would be the height of understatement—indeed, there aren't words in the English language to describe this record adequately.
The opening work, Ys, is a piece inspired by the legend of the 5th century capital of the kingdom of Cornwall, [most versions of the legend place the city in the Douarnenez Bay on the coast of Brittany] which was engulfed by a flood as punishment for its sins. (Debussy wrote one of his finest works, "The Engulfed Cathedral," later adapted by the group Renaissance into "The Harbor" on Ashes Are Burning, based on the same legend). The reflective "Marv Pontkellec" is every bit as sublimely beautiful, but the highlight of this record is "Gaeltacht," a 19 minute musical journey by Stivell's harp across the Gaelic lands of Ireland, Scotland, and the Isle of Man.

== Personnel ==
- Bass [Bass Guitar] - Gérard Levavsseur, Gérard Salkowsky
- Bombarde - Alan Kloatr, Mig Ar Biz
- Cello - Henri Delagarde, Jean Huchot, Manuel Recasens
- Double Bass - Jean-Marc Dollez
- Drums - Guy Cascales
- Drums [Scottish] - Yann-Fanch Ar Merdy
- Electric Guitar - Dan Ar Bras
- Organ - Gilles Tinayjre
- Percussion, Tabla - Michel Delaporte
- Producer - Franck Giboni
- Viola - Gabriel Beauvais, Paul Hadjaje, Pierre Cheval, Stéphane Weiner

== Track listing ==
Side A:

- A1 Ys Variations on folk themes. (Traditional, arranged by A. Stivell)
- A2 Marv Pontkalleg ("The Death of Pontcallec") Folk themes. A classical arrangement of Breton music. (Traditional, arranged by Denise Megevand)
- A3 Extracts From Pennlyn Manuscripts of Harp Music Sonatas for Bardic Harp transcribed from 17th Century Welsh manuscripts by Arnold Dolmetsch
  - A3a Ap Huw (Traditional, arranged by Arnold Dolmetsch)
  - A3b Penllyn (Traditional, arranged by Arnold Dolmetsch)
- A4 Eliz Iza Breton mountain folk song. (Traditional, arranged by A. Stivell)

Side B:

- B1 Gaeltacht Folk themes. A journey across Gaelic countries (Ireland, Scotland, Isle of Man)
  - B1a Caitlin Triall Irish Melody. (Traditional, arranged by A. Stivell)
  - B1b Port Ui Mhuirgheasa Irish Jig. (Traditional, arranged by A. Stivell)
  - B1c Airde Cuan Irish Melody. (Traditional, arranged by Jord Cochevelou) l
  - B1d Na Reubairean Scottish Melody. (Traditional, arranged by D. Megevand)
  - B1e Manx Melody (Traditional, Arranged By A. Stivell)
  - B1f Heman Dubh Hebridean Work Song. (Traditional, arranged by A. Stivell)
  - B1g Gaelic Waltz Scottish Waltz. (Traditional, arranged by A. Stivell)
  - B1h Struan Robertson Strathspey. (Traditional, arranged by A. Stivell)
  - B1i The Little Cascade Scottish Dance (Reel). (arranged by A. Stivell)
  - B1j Braigh Loch Iall Scottish Melody (Traditional, arranged by A. Stivell)
  - B1k Port An Deorai Suite of Irish Slip Jigs. (Traditional, arranged by A. Stivell)

== Discography ==
- Fontana 6325 302 [original French release]
- Philips 6414 406 [British release (w/ translated title) of 1973]
- Polydor 2424 069 [Canadian release of 1973]
- Rounder 3067 [American release of 1982]
- Philips 51 [British cassette/vinyl of 1983, re-released in 1990]
- Philips 818007-2 [British CD release of 1990]
