= Alan Stivell =

Breton musician (born 1944)

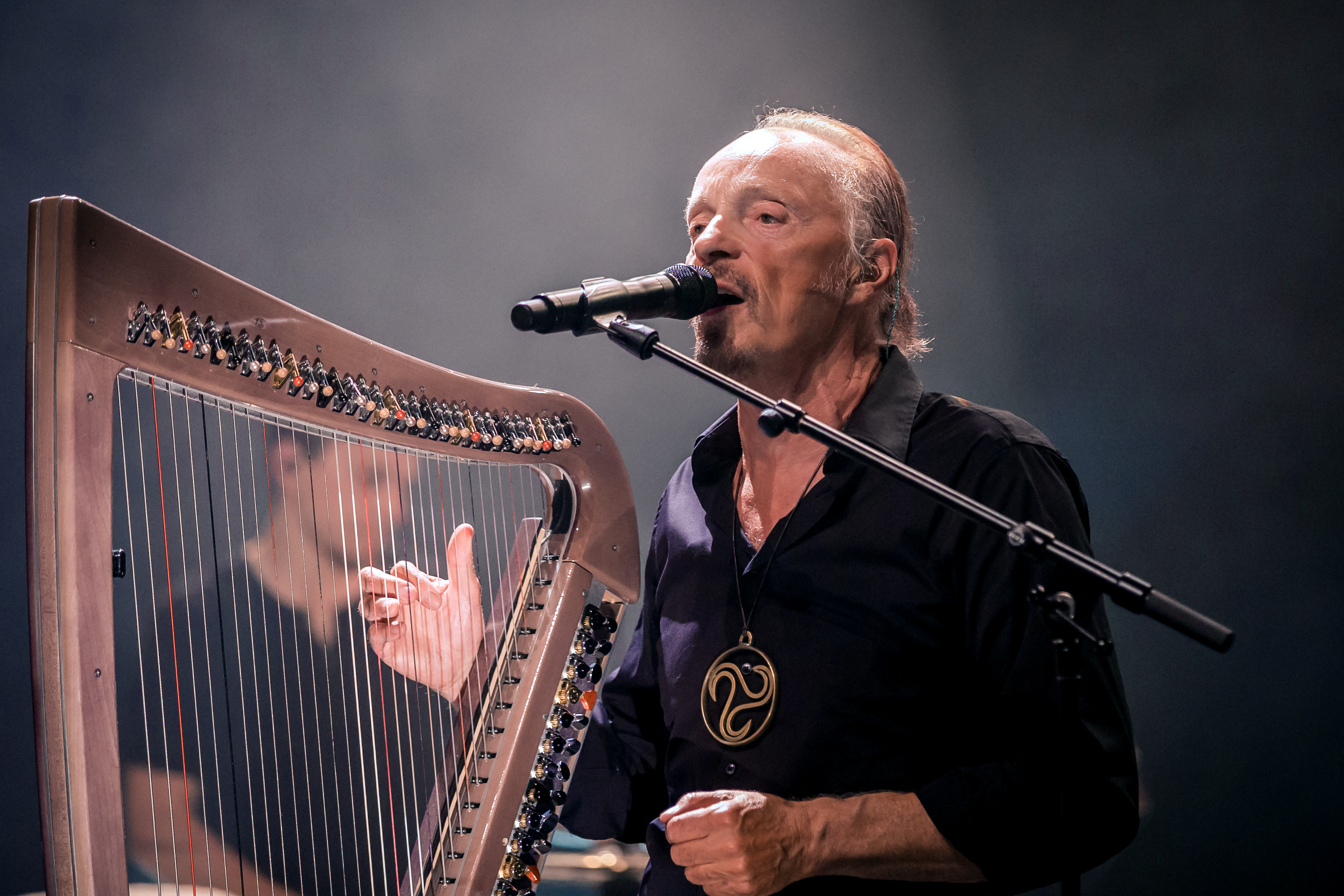
- Stivell in concert at Festival de Cornouaille (Quimper, Brittany), 2016

Background information
- Born: Alan Cochevelou; 6 January 1944 (age 82); Riom, Auvergne, France
- Genres: Celtic music, Breton Music, world music
- Occupations: Singer; songwriter; composer; musician
- Years active: 1960–present
- Label: Keltia III
- Website: alanstivell.bzh

Alan Stivell (Breton pronunciation: [ˈɑːlãn 'sti:vəlː]; born Alan Cochevelou on 6 January 1944) is a French Celtic musician and singer, songwriter, recording artist, and master of the Celtic harp from Brittany.

From the early 1970s, he revived global interest in the Celtic (specifically Breton) harp and Celtic music as part of world music. As a bagpiper and bombard player, he modernized traditional Breton music and singing in the Breton language. A precursor of Celtic rock, he is inspired by the union of the Celtic cultures and is a keeper of the Breton culture.

== Musical career ==
=== Early life and career beginnings ===
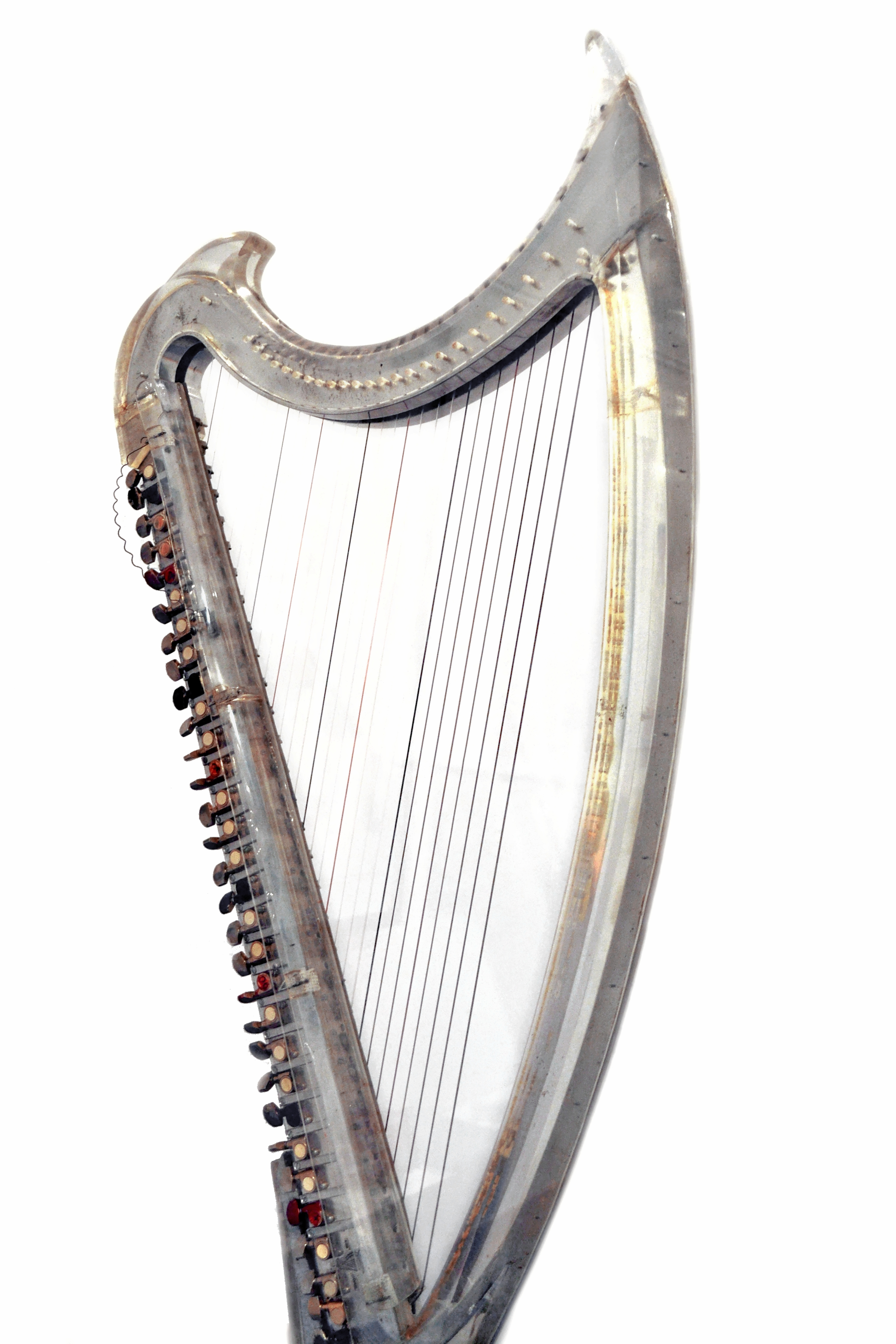
"Crystal Harp" solid-body (Goas-Stivell, 1987)

Alan Stivell was born in Riom on 6 January 1944. His birth name is Alan Cochevelou.

His father, Georges Cochevelou, was a civil servant in the French Ministry of Finance who achieved his dream of recreating a Celtic or Breton harp in the small town of Gourin, Brittany and his mother Fanny-Julienne Dobroushkess was of Lithuanian-Jewish descent. In 1953, Alan began playing the instrument at the age of nine under the tutelage of his father and Denise Megevand, a concert harpist. Alan also learned Celtic mythology, art, and history, as well as the Breton language, traditional Breton dance, and the Scottish bagpipe and the bombarde, a traditional Breton instrument, from the oboe family. Alan began playing concerts at the age of eleven and studied traditional Breton, English, Irish, Scottish, and Welsh folk music, also learning the drum, Irish flute, and tin whistle. He competed in, and won, several Breton traditional music competitions in the Bleimor Pipe band. Alan spent his childhood in Paris, with its cosmopolitan influences. But he fell in love with Breton music and Celtic culture, in general, and often went back in his teens to Brittany.

Stivell's first recording came in 1960 ("Musique gaelique"), a single that was followed by the LP Telenn Geltiek in 1964. He already recorded solo harp and harp backing singers in 1959 with Breiz ma bro ("Brittany my country") and a Mouez Breiz EP ("Voice of Brittany") with the female singer Andrea Ar Gouilh. His stage name, Stivell, means "fountain" or "spring" in Breton. The name refers both to the Breton renewal and to his surname Cochevelou (an evolution of kozh stivelloù, "the old fountains").

=== Stivell and the Celtic harp revival ===
With a new bardic harp with bronze strings, Stivell began experimenting with modernized styles of music that became known as Celtic rock. In 1966, Alan Stivell began to perform and record as a singer. The following year, he was signed by Philips Records. This was during the birth of the New Breton and Celtic music movement.

In 1968, after two years of touring and regular appearances at the American Students and Artists Center in Paris, Alan joined the Moody Blues onstage to perform in London's Queen Elizabeth Hall.

In 1970, Stivell released his first hits, the single "Broceliande" and the album Reflets, both on the Philips record label. He became closely associated with the burgeoning Breton roots revival, especially after the release of the purely instrumental 1971 album Renaissance of the Celtic Harp, which won one of the most famous awards in France, the prize of the Académie Charles Cros.

The music critic Bruce Elder wrote of the album Renaissance of the Celtic Harp:

People who hear this record are never the same again. Renaissance of the Celtic Harp, one of the most beautiful and haunting records ever made by anybody, introduced the Celtic harp to many thousands of listeners around the world. To call this music gorgeous and ravishing would be the height of understatement—indeed, there aren't words in the English language to describe this record adequately. The opening work, 'Ys', is a piece inspired by the legend of the fifth century capital of the kingdom of Cornwall, (most versions of the legend place the city in the Douarnenez Bay on the coast of Brittany), [said to have been] engulfed by a flood as punishment for its sins. (Debussy wrote one of his finest works, "The Engulfed Cathedral," later adapted by the group Renaissance into "At the Harbour" on the 1973 album Ashes Are Burning, based on the same legend). The reflective "Marv Pontkellec" is every bit as sublimely beautiful, but the highlight of this record is "Gaeltacht," a 19-minute musical journey by Stivell's harp across the Gaelic lands of Ireland, Scotland, and the Isle of Man.

On 28 February 1972, Stivell performed a concert in the Olympia theater, a famous music hall in Paris, where Alan and his band played music combining traditional Celtic music with modern sounds (electric guitar, drums, etc.). This concert made Stivell and his music well known throughout France. At this time, Stivell's eclectic approach to music was very new and was considered risky, but it soon became popular. Over 1,500,000 records of that concert (À l'Olympia) were sold. Alan Stivell's newfound fame propelled him to tour across France, the United Kingdom, Canada and the United States. He continued recording, and published a collection of Breton poetry in 1976. With his 1980 Symphonie Celtique, he mixed for the first time elements of rock, a symphonic orchestra, Celtic instruments and such non-European ethnic elements as Berber vocalist Djourha and sitarist Narendra Bataju.

The folk music revival faded somewhat in the 1980s. Though Alan Stivell still maintained a popular following, he did not reach the heights of popularity that he had in the 1970s. He continued touring in many parts of the world and recording for a loyal fanbase. He also worked with the English musician Kate Bush.

=== Celtic fusions and world music ===
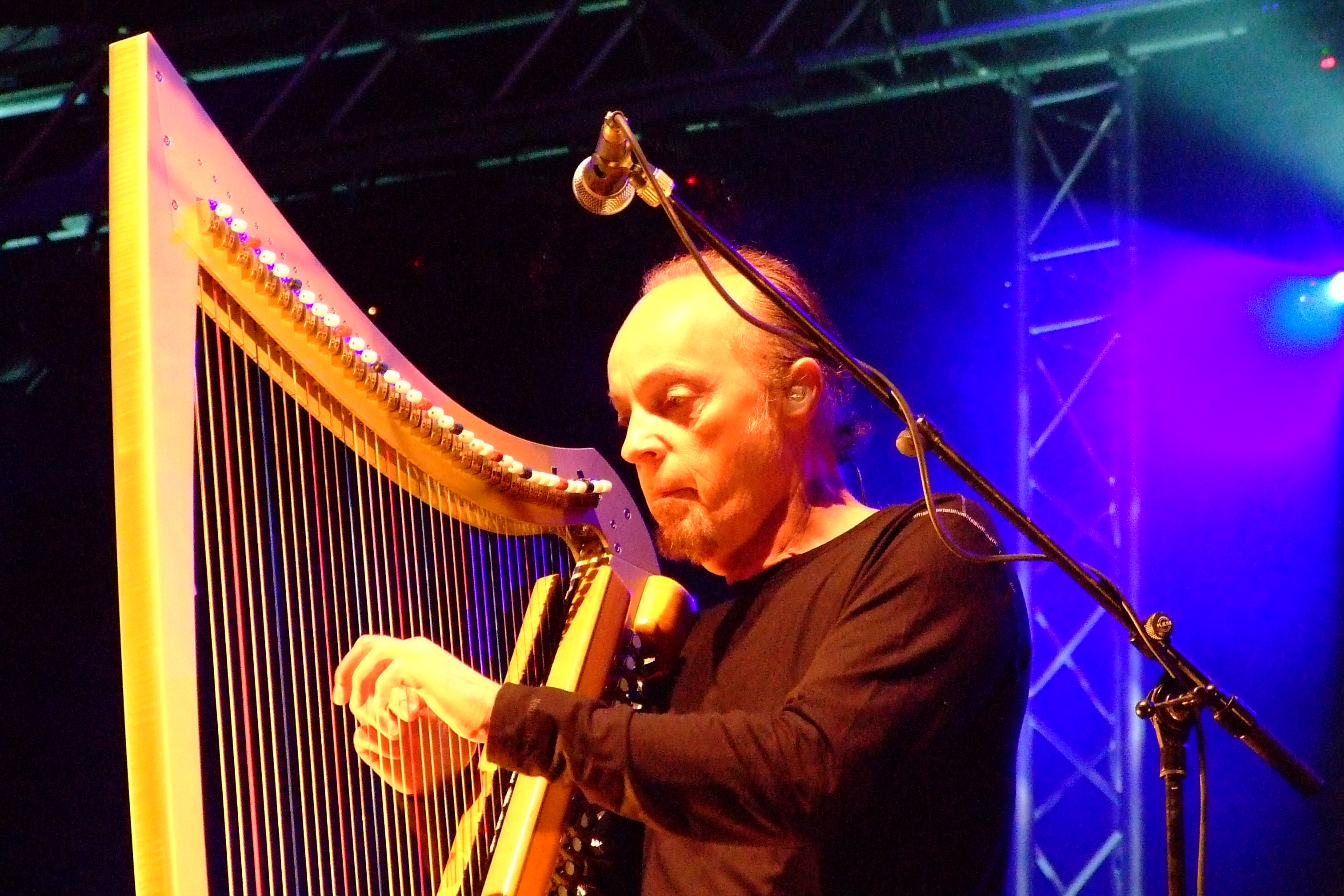
Alan Stivell at Nuremberg, Germany, 2007

In the 1990s, Stivell recorded with the French singer Laurent Voulzy, Irish traditional performer Shane MacGowan and Senegalese singer Doudou N'Diaye Rose. The album was Again, and it became very popular in France, initiating the beginning of a Celtic new wave. Stivell's records in the late 1990s contained more pronounced rock elements, and he performed at a rock festival called Transmusicales in Rennes. He continued working with a variety of musicians, inviting Paddy Moloney (of The Chieftains), Jim Kerr (of Simple Minds), Khaled and Youssou N'Dour to be in his very international 1 Douar / 1 Earth album.

The 1998 French-language hit "La Tribu de Dana" by rap trio Manau, one of the best-selling French singles of all time, featured a very similar musical arrangement to Stivell's "Tri Martolod". Although Stivell sued Manau for the unauthorised sampling, the group claimed that they had modified the original sufficiently, through the addition of lyrics and other changes, to avoid any charges of plagiarism. Stivell is now credited for a part of "La Tribu de Dana"'s arrangements.

Stivell's CD album Again in 1993 was the base for a new wave of his popularity, especially in France and Brittany. Other albums received good critical reviews, such as Brian Boru or 1 Douar ("1 Earth"). In 2002 Stivell released Au-delà des mots ("Beyond Words"), his twenty-first LP. The album featured him playing six different harps, specially dedicated to the Celtic Harp Revival's 50th anniversary.

In 2004, to celebrate the 50th anniversary of the Celtic harp revival in Brittany, he wrote a book in collaboration with Jean-Noël Verdier: Telenn, la harpe bretonne ("Telenn, the Breton harp"). The same year, the DVD Parcours was published by Fox-Pathé.

In 2006, a new CD album called Explore came out in France and other countries, distributed through Harmonia Mundi. The album explored fusions of Celtic music with electro-rock, raga and hip-hop with a unique and personal vocal style and an original mix of lyrics in Breton, English and French.

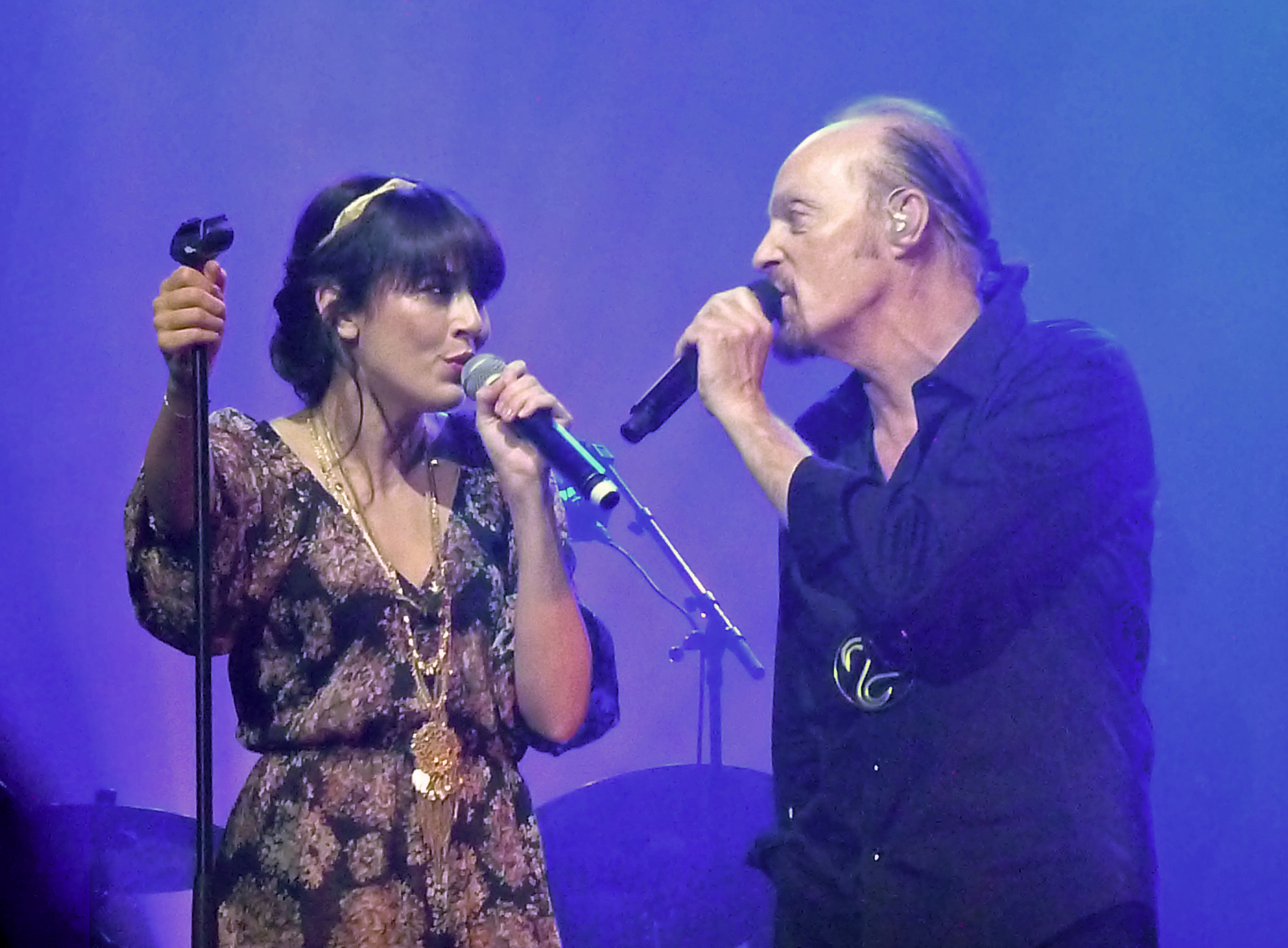
Alan Stivell and Nolwenn Leroy performing "Brian Boru" at the Paris Olympia in 2012

In 2009, the title of his album Emerald celebrated his emerald anniversary with his fans (i.e. forty years together) and paid homage to the sea and the Celtic lands (color blue-green, Glaz in Breton language). In 2013, a new CD album and DVD called Olympia 40th Anniversary came out in France (Universal) as a result of the concert performed at the Olympia mythical music hall on 16 February 2012.

On 2 October 2015, Stivell released a new CD album called AMzer: Seasons through WorldVillage in France (and other countries), his first one of the 2010s, coinciding with his career's 50th anniversary. The album is also available as a "Leclerc limited edition" including 3 bonus tracks (2 alternative mixes and a brand new instrumental) and a 60-page booklet.

== Critical acclaim ==
Music critic Bruce Eder has written: "[Stivell's] harp recordings, with their enveloping lyricism and tightly interwoven patterns of variations, can appeal to more serious listeners of new age music. Stivell's main audience, however, lies with fans of Celtic music and culture, and English folk music. Embracing ancient and modern elements, but (apart from his folk-rock work) making no compromises to modern melodic sensibilities, his music captures the mystery and strangeness of Breton, Irish, Welsh, and Scottish landscapes that are both ageless and timeless. It is haunting, mysterious, and beautiful, with no equivalent in modern popular music and few peers in the realm of commercial folk music."

== Interviews ==
An English translation of Stivell's interview for Le Peuple Breton by Peter Barry was published in the Scottish political, current affairs and arts review, Calgacus in 1975.

In the 1978 book Racines interdites ("Forbidden Roots"), a series of interviews with Stivell covers questions about the Breton language, history and geography, as well as his utopian vision of a world living in meditative harmony with nature. Lyrics for 17 of Stivell's songs are reprinted at the back of the book.

== Legacy ==
Alan Stivell has influenced multiple contemporary artists, most notably folk metal band Eluveitie. Their biggest hit 'Inis Mona' shares a melody with the traditional Tri Martolod. Where it is played on bagpipes, tin whistle and hurdy-gurdy with the addition of harsh vocals, electric guitar, bass guitar and drums.

== Instruments ==
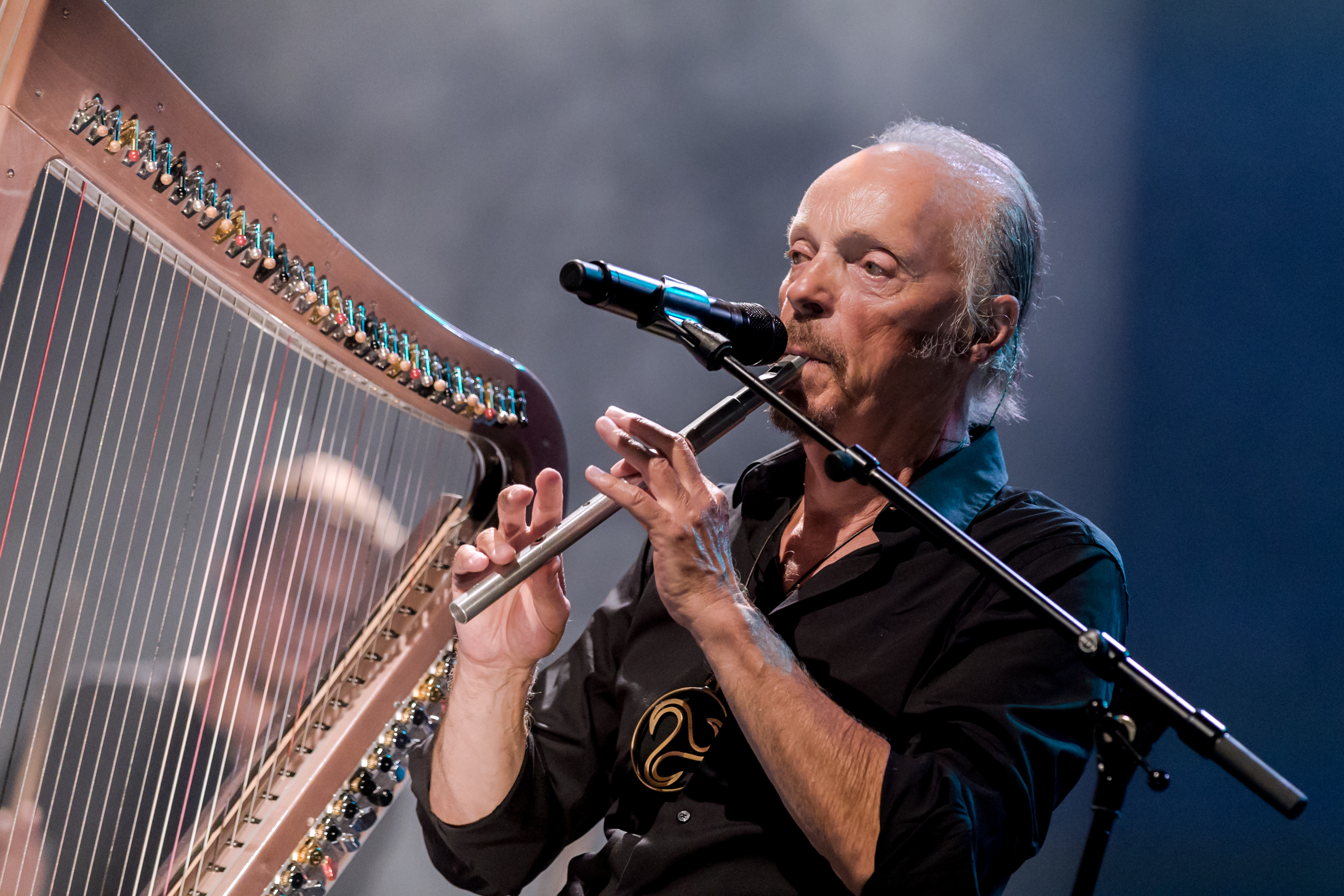
Celtic harp and low whistle

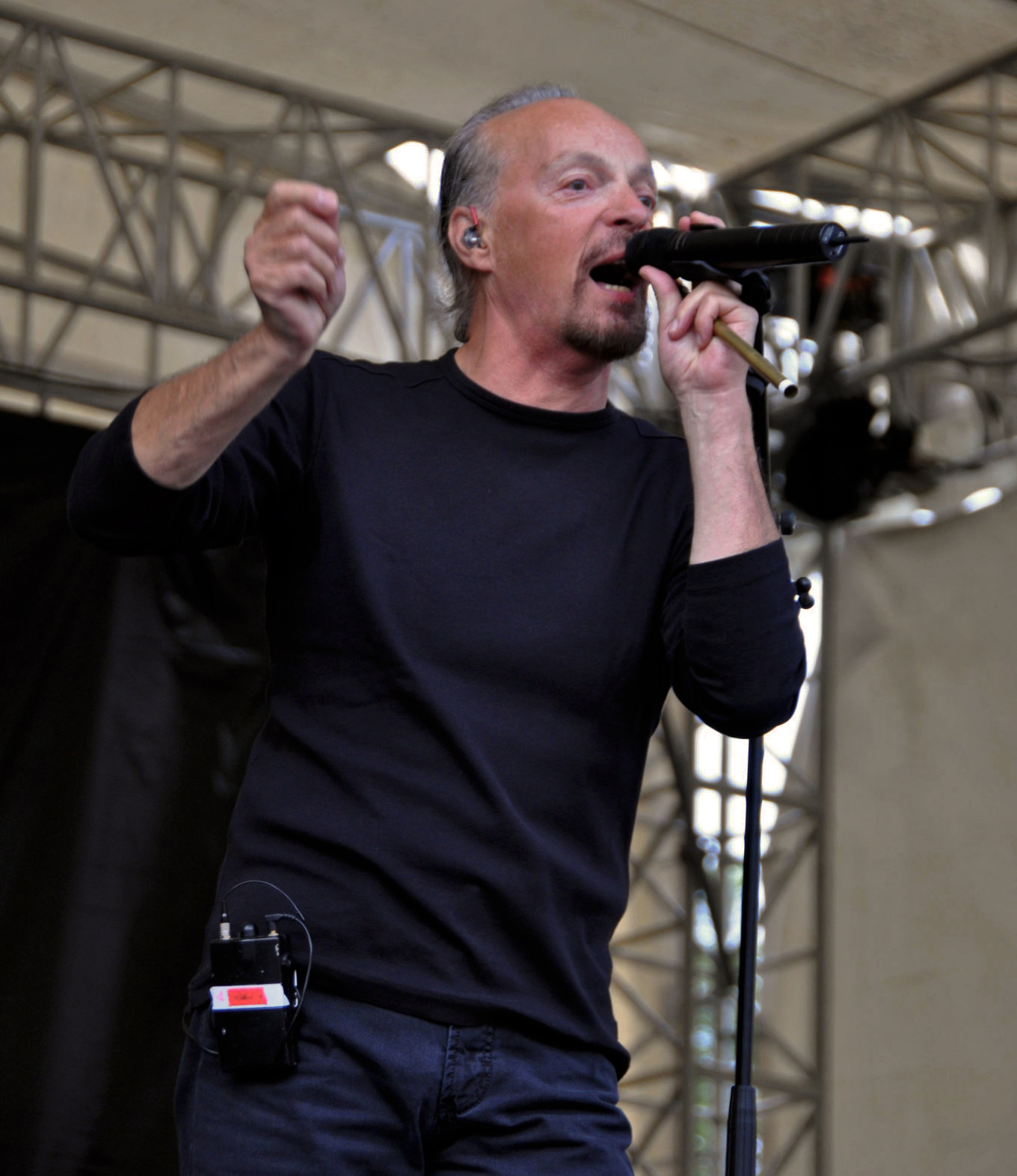
Vocals and tin whistle

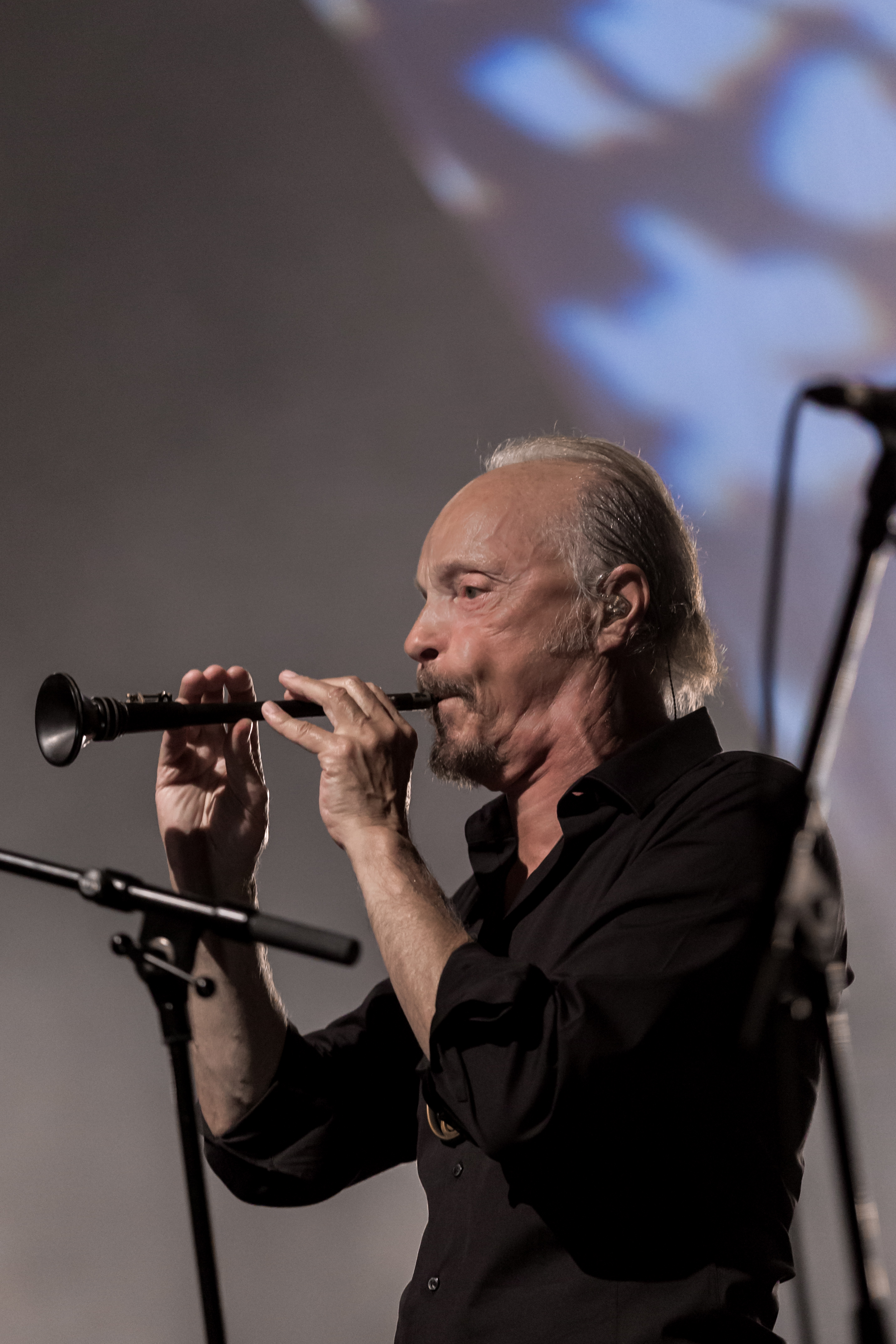
Bombard

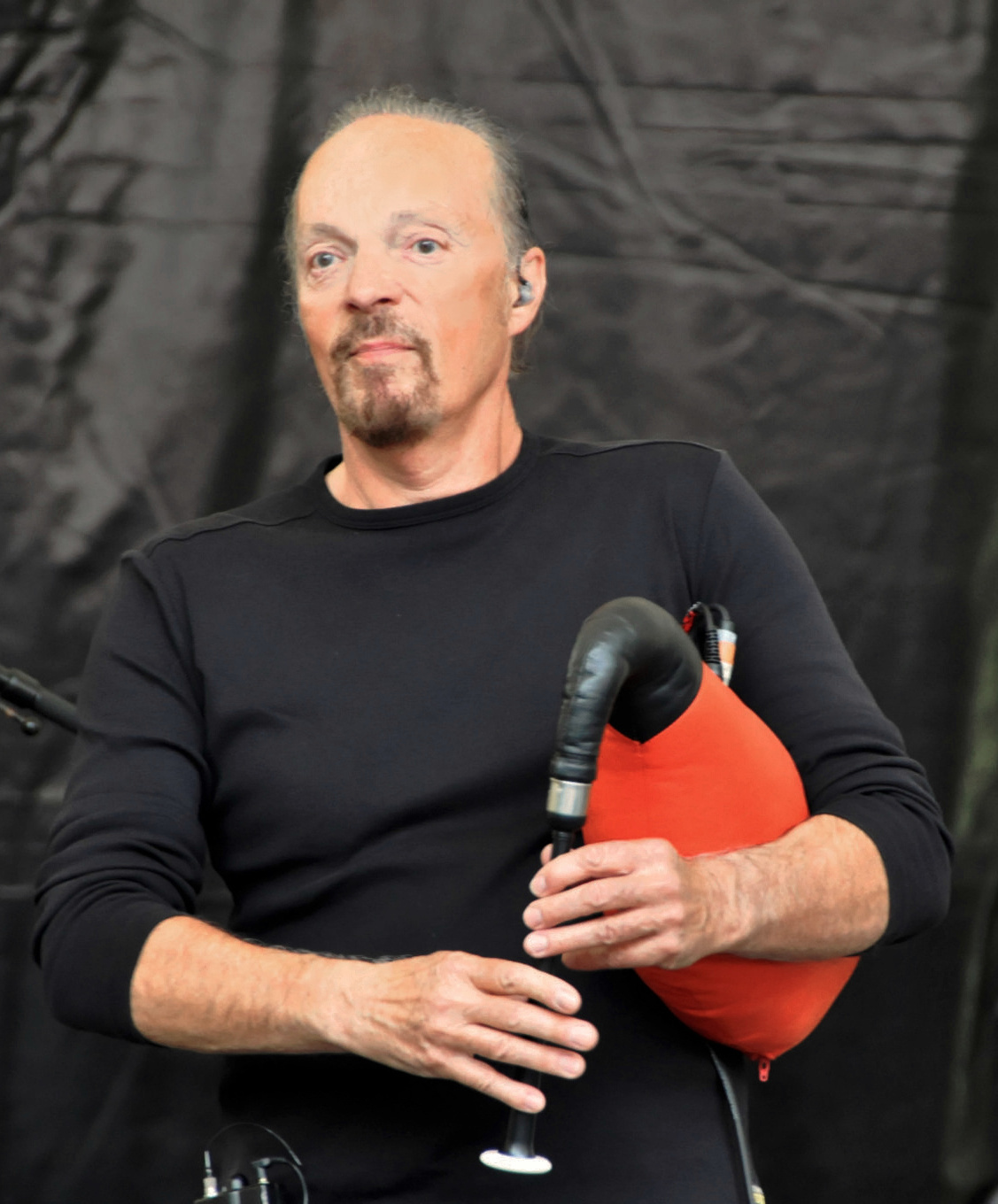
Electronic bagpipes (MIDI)

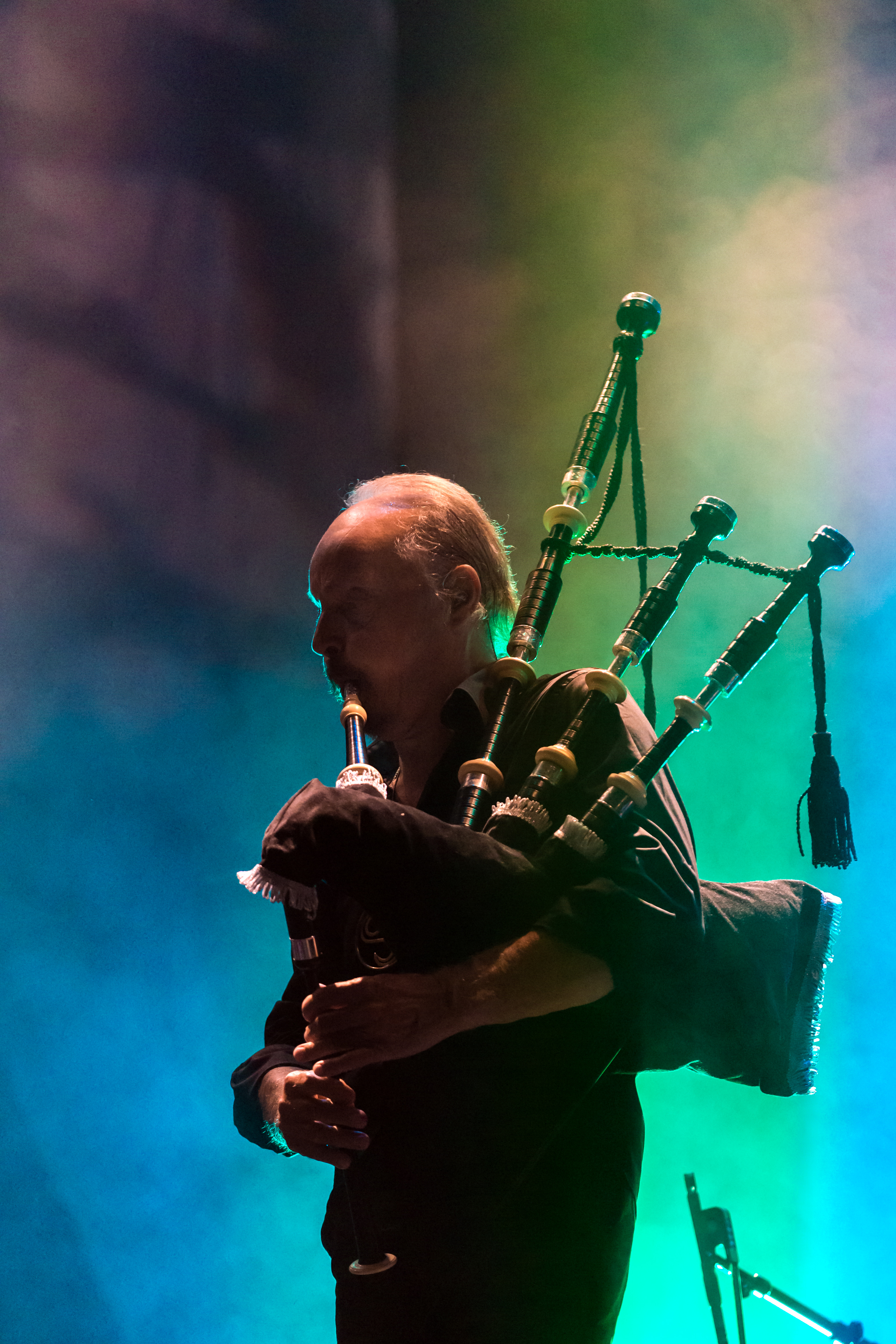
Great Highland bagpipe

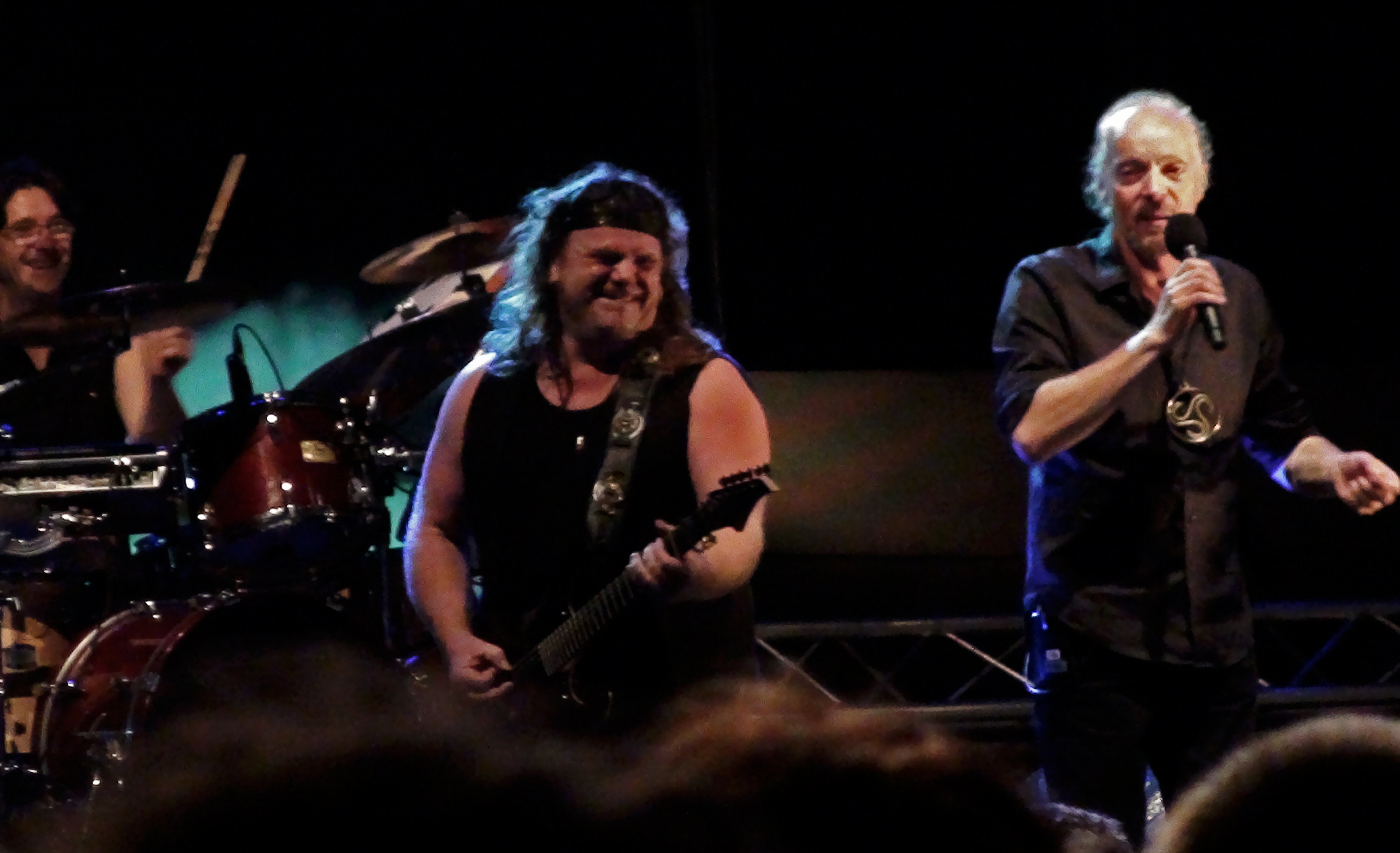
Electric guitar

== Discography ==
=== Original (studio and live) albums ===
1. Telenn Geltiek / Harpe celtique (1964) (studio #01 / instrumental #01)
2. Reflets / Reflections (1970) (studio #02)
3. Renaissance of the Celtic Harp (1971) (studio #03 / instrumental #02)
4. À l'Olympia / Olympia Concert (1972) (live #01)
5. Chemins de Terre / From Celtic Roots / Celtic Rock (1973) (studio #04)
6. E Langonned (1974) (studio #05)
7. E Dulenn / À Dublin / Live in Dublin (1975) (live #02)
8. Trema'n inis: Vers l'Île (1976) (studio #06)
9. Raok Dilestra: Avant d'accoster / Before Landing (1977) (studio #07)
10. Un dewezh 'barzh 'gêr: Journée à la maison / A Homecoming (1978) (studio #08)
11. International Tour: Tro ar Bed (1979) (live #03)
12. Symphonie Celtique: Tir Na N-Og / Celtic Symphony (1979) (studio #09)
13. Terre des vivants: Bed an dud vew (1981) (studio #10)
14. Legend / Légende / Mojenn (1983) (studio #11)
15. Harps of the New Age / Harpes du Nouvel Âge / Telenn a' Skuilh-dour (1985) (studio #12 / instrumental #03)
16. The Mist of Avalon (1991) (studio #13)
17. Again (1993) (studio re-recordings with other artists in duet)
18. Brian Boru (1995) (studio #15)
19. 1 Douar / 1 Earth (1998) (studio #16) ("Eunn Douar" in Breton)
20. Back to Breizh (1999) (studio #17)
21. Au-delà des mots / En tu-hont d'ar c'homzoù / Beyond Words (2002) (studio #18 / instrumental #04)
22. Explore (2006) (studio #19)
23. Emerald (2009) (studio #20)
24. AMzer: Seasons (2015) (studio #21)
25. Human~Kelt (2018) (studio #22)

A l'Olympia and In Dublin were recorded live, but featured only new, previously unreleased tracks.

=== Compilations ===
- Attention! Alan Stivell! (1973)
- Grand Succès d'Alan Stivell (1975)
- 70/95 Zoom (1997) – Disques Dreyfus (2-CD compilation 1970~1995, 35 tracks)
- Routes (1997) – Disques Dreyfus (4-CD boxset / 73 tracks / 32-pages booklet)
- Vers l'île (1999) – Universal Music Group (3CD "Long Box" / 30 titres / booklet)
- Ar Pep Gwellañ (Le best of) (2012) – Universal Music Group (CD best-of including a bonus CD of the remastered recording of the 1972 "Olympia" concert)
- 40th Anniversary Olympia 2012 (2013) – Universal Mercury (CD/DVD Live about the new concert in Paris)

== Family tree ==
Ancestors of Alan Stivell

8. François Cochevelou; (5/22/1818 in Gourin – 11/7/1887 in Gourin)
4. François-Pierre-Marie Cochevelou; (9/29/1864 in Nouec Vihan – 3/10/1893 in Pontivy) railway worker in 1889
9. Marie Anne Coroller; (b. 2/25/1832 in Gourin)
2. Georges Cochevelou; (5/13/1889 in Paris – 12/20/1974 in Saint-Mandé) civil servant in the French Ministry of Finance
10. François Marie Lintanff; (b. 5/28/1844 in Mûr-de-Bretagne)
5. Anne-Marie-Eulalie Lintanff; (b. 3/25/1869 in Pontivy)
11. Eleonore Marie Schutz; (b. 4/25/1844 in Pontivy)
1. Alain Cochevelou; (b. 1/6/1944 in Riom) musician
6. Haïm Woulf Dobroushkess (добрушкес); (b. ≃1865 in the Baltic states, Russian Empire) stonemason
3. Fanny-Julienne Dobroushkess; (b. 3/31/1903 in Paris – 9/26/2005 in Limeil-Brévannes)
7. Julie Lévy
