= Music of Brittany =

Since the early 1970s, Brittany has experienced a tremendous revival of its folk music. Along with flourishing traditional forms such as the bombard-biniou pair and fest-noz ensembles incorporating other additional instruments, it has also branched out into numerous subgenres.

== Traditional Breton music ==
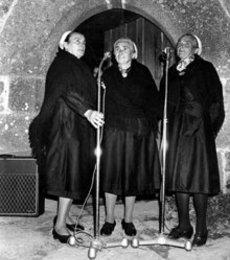
The Goadec sisters

Traditional Breton folk music includes a variety of vocal and instrumental styles. Purely traditional musicians became the heroes of the roots revival in the second half of the 20th century, notably the Goadec sisters (Maryvonne, Thasie, and Eugénie). At the end of the 19th century, the vicomte Theodore Hersart de la Villemarqué's collection of largely nationalistic Breton songs, Barzaz Breiz, was also influential, and was partially responsible for preserving Breton traditions.

=== Vocal music ===
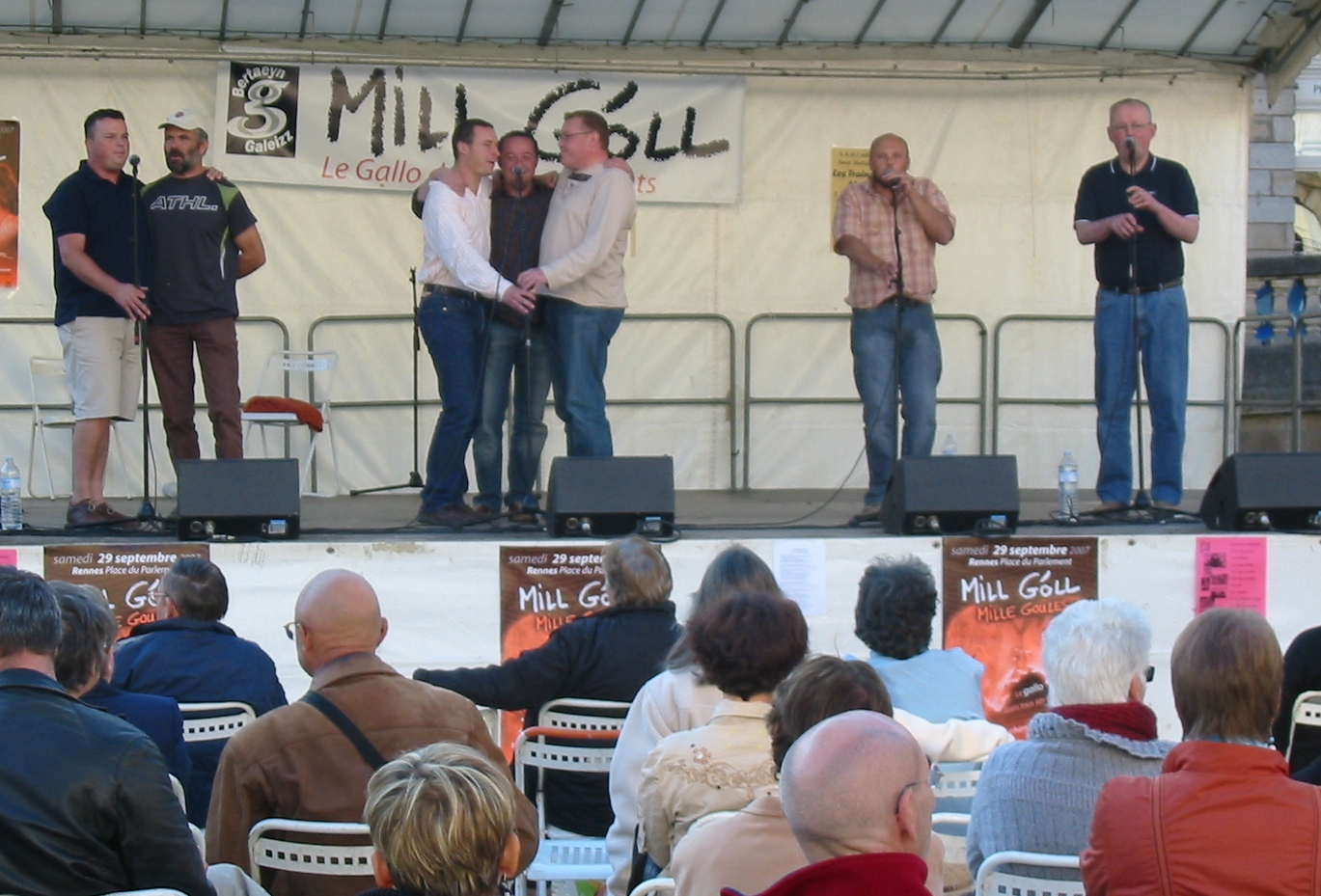
Les Traines Meuriennes singing call and response at Mill Góll 2007 in Rennes

Kan ha diskan (roughly translated as call and response singing) is probably the most common type of Breton vocal music, and is the most typical style to accompany dance music. It has become perhaps the most integral part of the Breton roots revival, and was the first genre of Breton music to gain some mainstream success, both in Brittany and abroad. Such material is most often in the Breton language, but sometimes in French or another, depending on the target audience.

The lead singer is the kaner, and the second singer is the diskaner. The kaner sings a phrase, and the diskaner sings the last few lines with the kaner, then repeats it alone until the same last few lines, when the kaner again joins in. The phrase's repetition is changed slightly in each execution. Kan ha diskan can be songs about any subject, but must meet one of a number of meters used in folk dances, mostly line or round. Vocables, or nonsense syllables (typically tra la la la leh no), are sometimes used to drag out lines. Usually, a kan ha diskan lasts from 5 to 20 minutes.

In addition to the Goadecs, the singer Loeiz Ropars was largely responsible for maintaining Kan Ha Diskan's vitality in the middle of the 20th century, and the 1960s and 1970s revivalists drew largely on his work. They also venerated performers like Ar Vreudeur Morvan and Les soeurs Goadec/Ar c'hoarezed Goadeg. During the folk revival, aspiring musicians sought out elder teachers from whom to learn kan ha diskan, generally being viewed as successful when the student can act as a diskaner to their mentor. Teachers of this era included Marcel Guilloux and Yann-Fanch Kemener.

It was, however, Ropars who adapted the fest-noz, a "night party" in rural communities, for a new type of fest-noz (amplification for the singers), and set the stage for the folk revival.

=== Kantikoù (hymns) ===
Kantik ("canticle") is a type of hymn that is vocal but includes accompaniment from a variety of instruments, commonly including the harp, pipes and organ. Modern performers include Anne Auffret and the choir Ensemble Choral du Bout du Monde.

=== Gwerzioù and sonioù (laments and ballads) ===
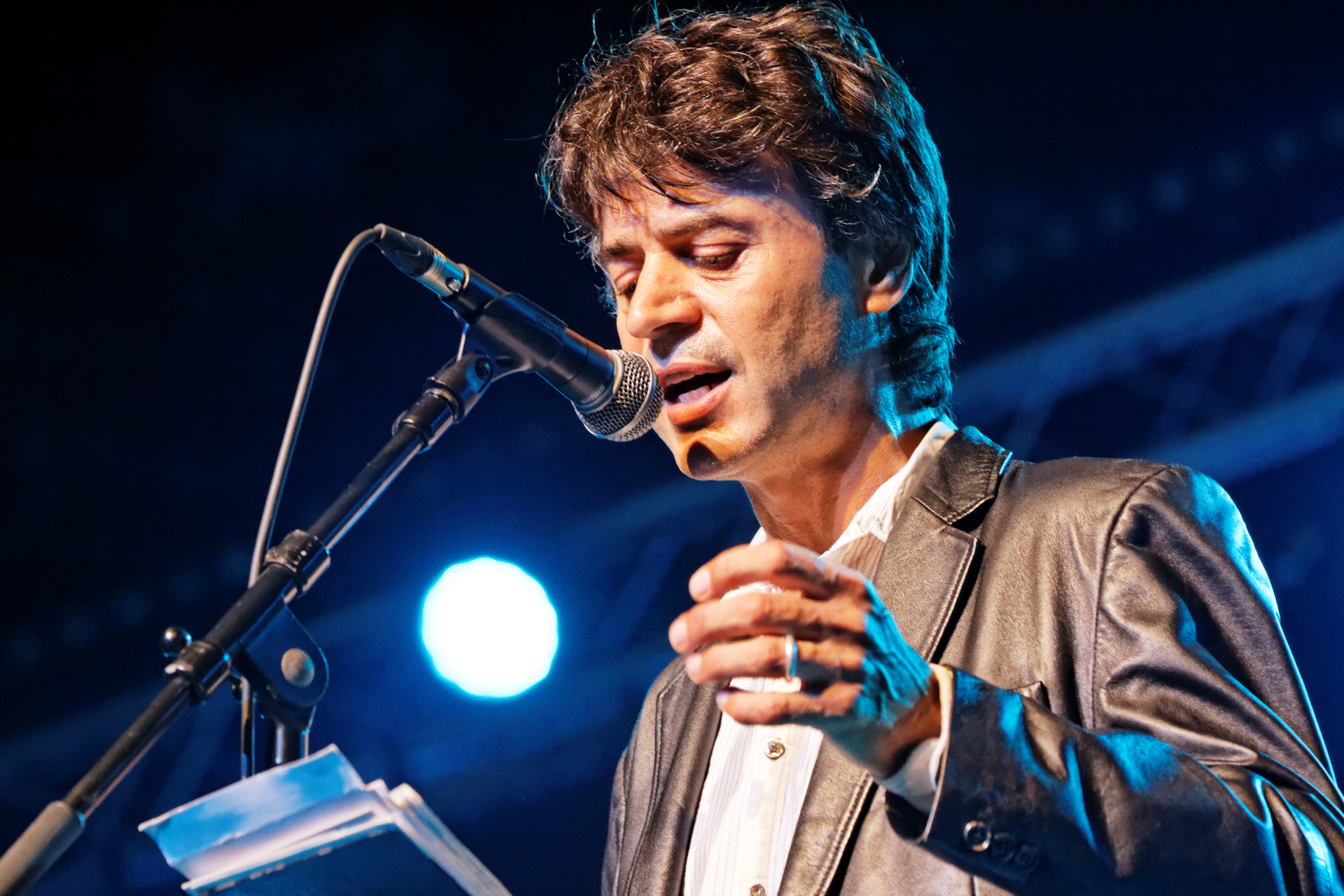
Denez Prigent, a gwerz singer

Gwerzioù and sonioù are the two primary classifications of Breton unaccompanied folk songs. Vocals for both types are usually by a soloist. A gwerz is a lament characterized by a gloomy tone and subject matter. A Gwerz typically describes tragic events such as murders, deaths, wars, forced emigration or lost love.

Performers in this field include Jean Le Meut from Vannes, whose songs are mostly of the sonioù variety, and are typically pastoral songs concerning love and marriage. More contemporary singers include Iffig Troadeg, who focuses on lyrically shocking gwerzioù, Patrick Marie, Marthe Vassalo, Klervi Rivière, Mathieu Hamon, Annie Ebrel, Érik Marchand and Denez Prigent.

=== Chants de marins (sailor songs) ===
The chants de marins, are shanties, ballads about shipwrecks, sailing and loss of life, often accompanied by instruments such as the fiddle and accordion.

Although it is not exclusively Breton, the large number of sailors in this region have given this form of musical expression a high-profile. The best known modern performers are Djiboudjep and Cabestan, along with numerous but less known bands such as Tonnerre de Brest, L'Echo, Les Boucaniers or Taillevent. There are new composers too : Michel Tonnerre is a well-known modern composer of Chants de marins; some of his compositions are as famous as ancient songs (Quinze marins, Satanicles, Vire au cabestan, Mon petit garçon).

There is an annual Chants de marins contest in the small town of Paimpol, in north Brittany, where the most famous shantymen of the world meet. At any harbour festival in Brittany Chants de marins can usually be heard.

=== Instrumental music ===
Since the Breton folk music revival, Scottish bagpipes and Irish harps have been added to the Breton repertoire, though Brittany retains its own unbroken piping traditions as well as mainstay instruments such as the bombard.

==== Celtic harp (telenn) ====
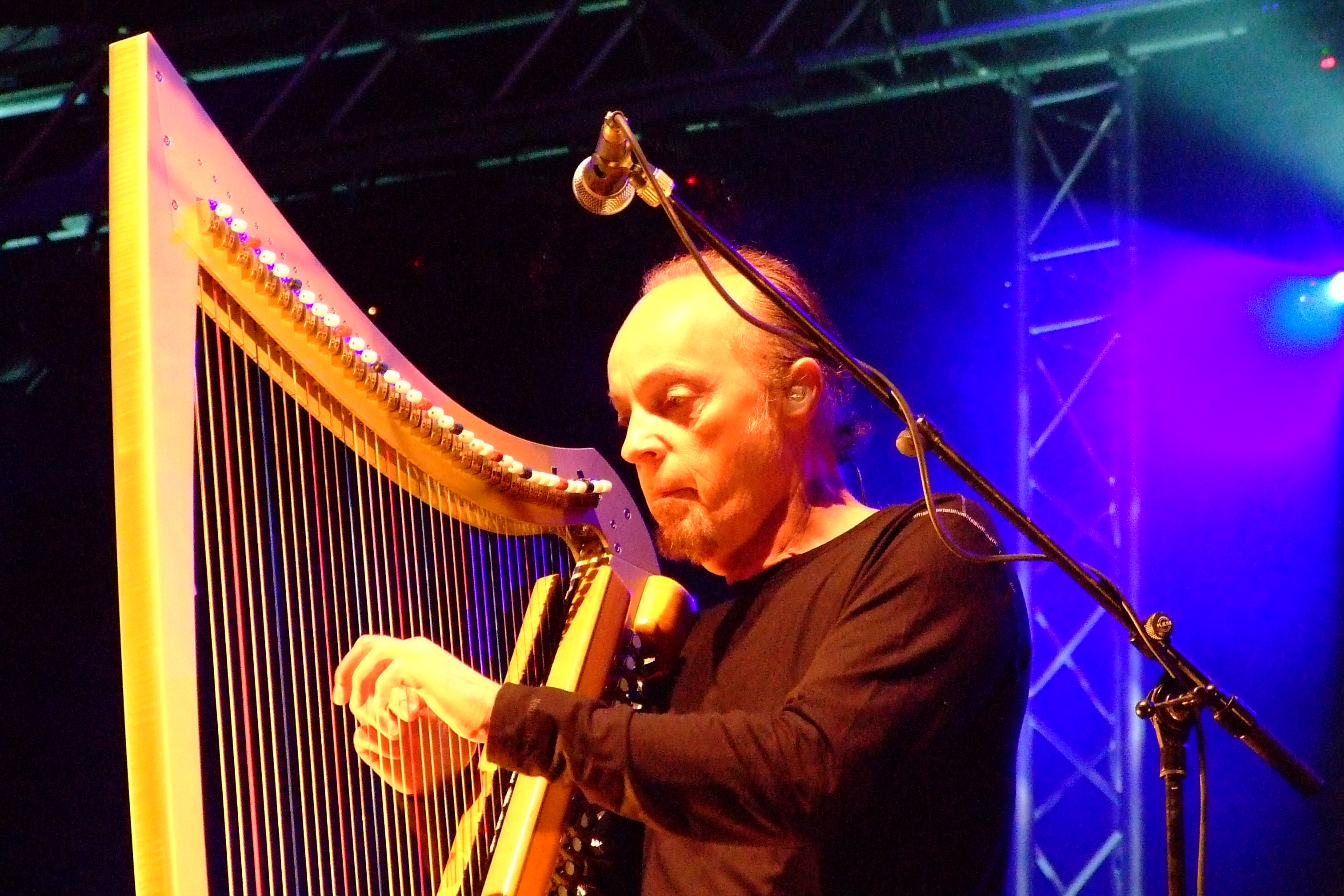
Alan Stivell, Breton harpist

Though the harp had been common in Brittany in the Middle Ages, the instrument had disappeared by the 18th century, at least in its specific repertoire and making. Early in the 20th century, a Breton harpist Paul Diverres living in Wales came several times to play in Brittany. Just before and after the Second World War, Gildas Jaffrenou built a harp from the 14th-century plans for the Brian Boru model. But this was not enough for a revival.

In 1952–1953, Jord Cochevelou built the first Breton new-Celtic harp. Since then and during the 50s, the Celtic harp or Breton harp has taken its place back into Breton music thanks to Jord and his son Alan Cochevelou; Alan was the first person to play it in public and became world-famous under his stage name Alan Stivell.

Modern Breton performers include Myrdhin, An Triskell, Kristen Nogues and Dominig Bouchaud.

==== Violin ====
The violin is an instrument played across France. Perhaps because of this wide-ranging appeal and lack of regional uniqueness, the instrument was somewhat ignored during the Breton folk revival in the mid-20th century. However, the instrument remains a common part of Breton folk bands today.

The violin has been played in Brittany since at least the 17th century, and was possibly the most widespread instrument in the land by the early 20th century. It was only a few decades later, however, that the accordion nearly wiped the violon out, and most fiddlers joined Irish bands, moved into jazz or otherwise left the instrument. The violon survived, however. Alan Stivell has used the fiddle and electric violin in his arrangements and compositions since his first album in 1970, inviting different fiddlers for his tours and records. It opened the way for a new generation of performers including Christian Lemaitre, Jackie Molard and the six-violin band Archétype.

==== Clarinet (treujenn-gaol) ====
The clarinet was invented in Germany in the 18th century. It evolved from earlier single reed instruments such as the renaissance chalumeaux, or schalmei. Clarinets were quickly incorporated into orchestras, from where they moved into marching bands and the amateur musicians in them. By the 19th century, the clarinet had entered a number of folk traditions and spread to many parts of the world. In Brittany, the instrument is called a treujenn-gaol (Breton), which translates as cabbage stalk.

The traditional Breton clarinet usually has only 13 keys (though sometimes as few as six), in contrast to the more common 'Boehm' instrument used in jazz, classical music and other fields. This is because classical musicians discarded the clarinets with fewer keys in favor of more complex and state-of-the-art pieces.

After a decline in use in traditional music, the instrument came back, notably in the music of the bagad and paired with the accordion.

In Breton music, two clarinetists typically play together, though they also play in ensembles with accordions and violins. The clarinet is a common part of Breton jazz bands, along with saxophones and drums, playing both jazz and traditional songs.

The best-known Breton clarinetists are probably Érik Marchand, a former member of both Quintet Clarinettes and Gwerz, Gallo musician Yves LeBlanc, and Christian Duro, who plays in the group Termajik. The bands Darhaou, Tonnerre de Brest, L'Echo, Cabestan and Strobinell have also used clarinets.

==== Guitar ====
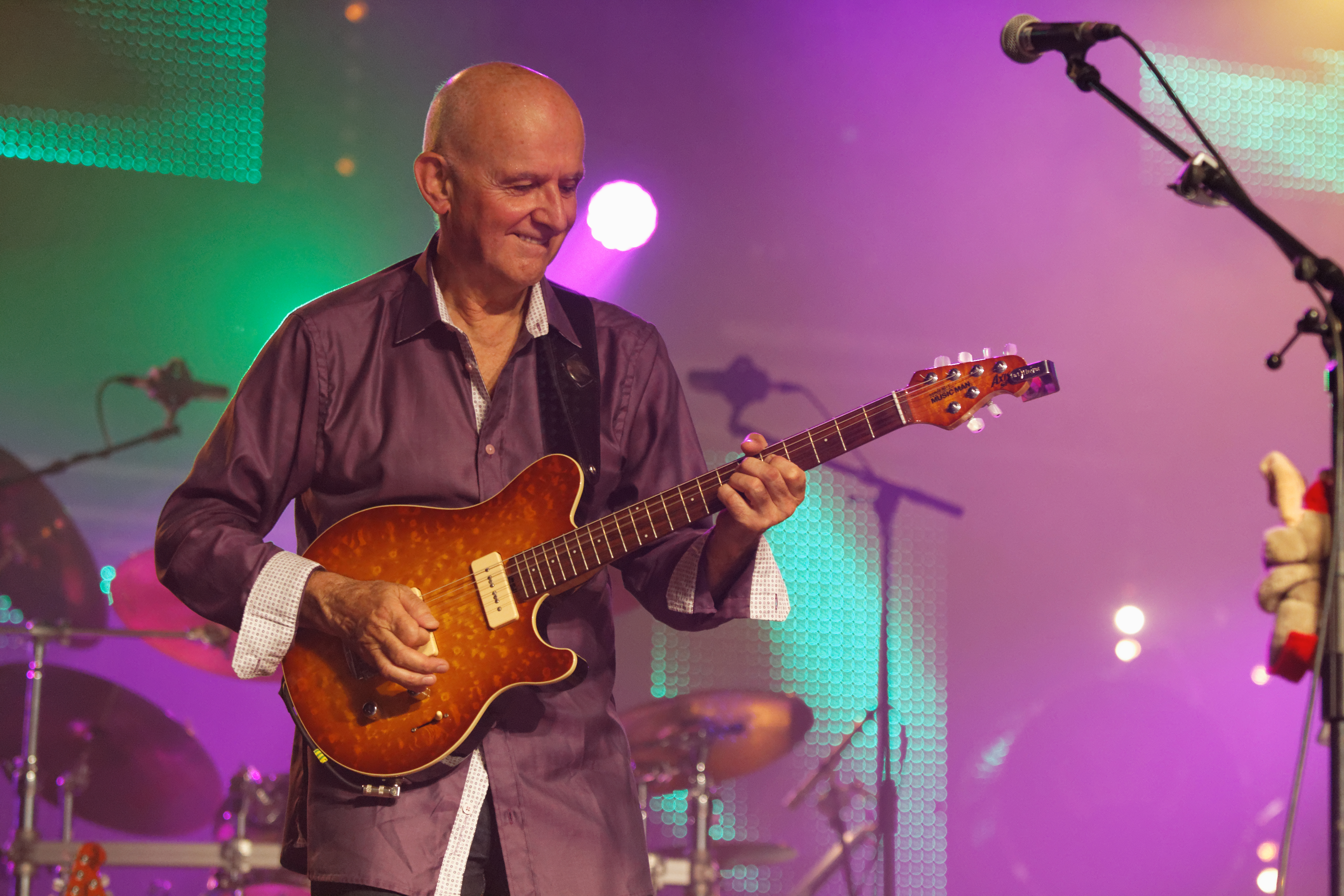
Dan Ar Braz.

Perhaps the earliest popularizer of Breton guitar was Dan Ar Braz, who continues to be an influential figure in a somewhat jazzy, easy-listening vein. In the traditional music world, Soïg Siberil emerged as the pre-eminent master of 'open tuning' in bands such as Gwerz and Kornog, developing a complex accompaniment and solo technique easily comparable to that of artists such as John Renbourn or Pierre Bensusan. Another guitarist of note is Gilles Le Bigot, who performed with Kornog as well and has been a mainstay of the Breton super-group Skolvan for more than 20 years. Other notable Breton guitarists include Jacques Pellen, Pat O'May, Nicolas Quemener, Fabrice Carre, Roland Conq and Arnaud Royer, who has developed a unique and complex self-accompaniment technique based on sampling and then playing along with loops of his own work.

==== Wooden flute ====
The wooden transverse flute entered Brittany only relatively recently, popularized by Jean Michel Veillon. Veillon has been a member of a number of prominent bands, including Pennoù Skoulm, Barzaz, Den and Kornog, as well as producing some influential solo albums. Other performers include Youenn Le Cam of Pevar Den, Jean Luc Thomas of Kej, Yannig Alory of Carré Manchot, Yann Herri Ar Gwicher of Strobinell and Hervé Guillo of Storvan, and also Gilles Lehart, who is one of Brittany's most respected wooden flute makers.

==== Accordion ====
The accordion only arrived in large numbers in the country in about 1875, but its popularity grew quickly. Among the reasons for this were the instrument's cheapness and durability, which could be played solo, and was easier to learn. Perhaps the most important reason, though, was the instrument's association with 'kof ha kof' couples dancing like waltzes and mazurkas, which stood in stark contrast to the line and round dances familiar in Breton folk; the perceived sexuality of the instrument's common dances may have made it more attractive. By the 1920s, the instrument was more popular than any other. In the 1930s, chromatic accordions arrived in Brittany and jazz-influenced bands with saxophones, drum kits and banjos were formed.

Contemporary accordionists include Cocktail Diatonique, Regis Huiban, Bruno Le Tron, Patrick Lefebvre, Yann Dour, Yann-Fañch Perroches and Alain Pennec.

==== Bagpipes ====
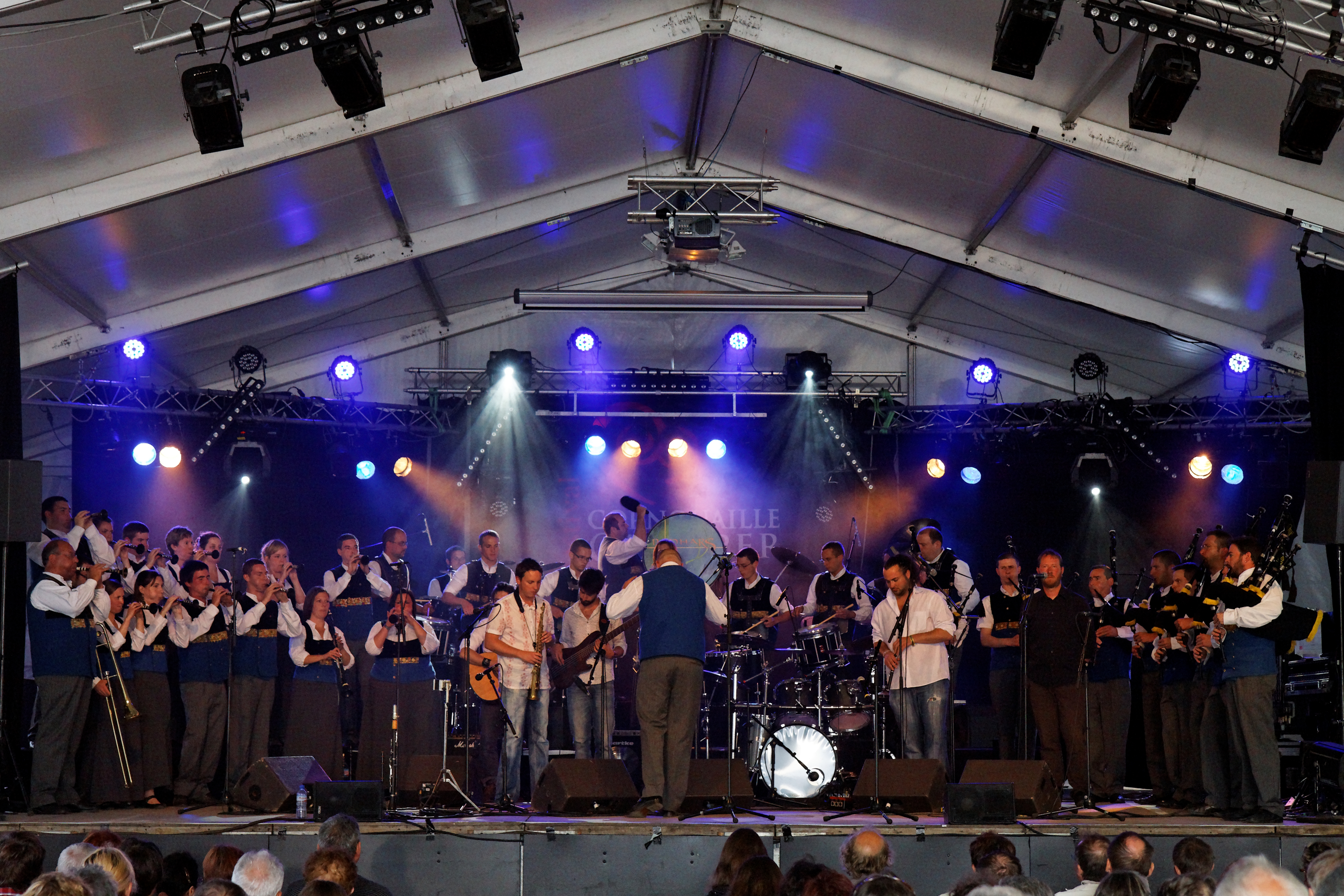
A bagad from Quimper

There are two types of bagpipes indigenous to Brittany. The veuze is very similar to other western European bagpipes such as the Gaita from Galicia and Asturies, while the biniou kozh (old biniou in Breton) is much smaller and is used to accompany the bombarde. The biniou, which plays exactly one octave above the bombarde, and bombarde duo (soner ar couple) are an integral and common part of Breton folk music, and was used historically for dance music. The two performers play alternate lines that intersect at the end, in a similar manner to the Kan ha Diskan style of singing; the bombarde does not usually play every line of the tune, however, usually instead playing every other line, or three out of four lines in a dance tune. The Highland bagpipe, which was imported in the late 19th century, is often called binioù braz, sometimes pib-veur (the large biniou, the large pipe). The image to the right shows the binioù braz, or highland bagpipes, with bombardes in the hands of the men in the background.

===== Veuze =====
The veuze has a chanter of conical bore fitted with a double reed and a drone fitted with one reed, both attached to a mouth-inflated bag. Its sound and design are similar to Flemish pipes and Galician gaita. In the 20th century, the term veuze came to be applied to the diatonic accordion, which had been recently imported, and the use of the bagpipes declined. Though still not common, it has rebounded since the Breton folk revival.

===== Binioù bras =====
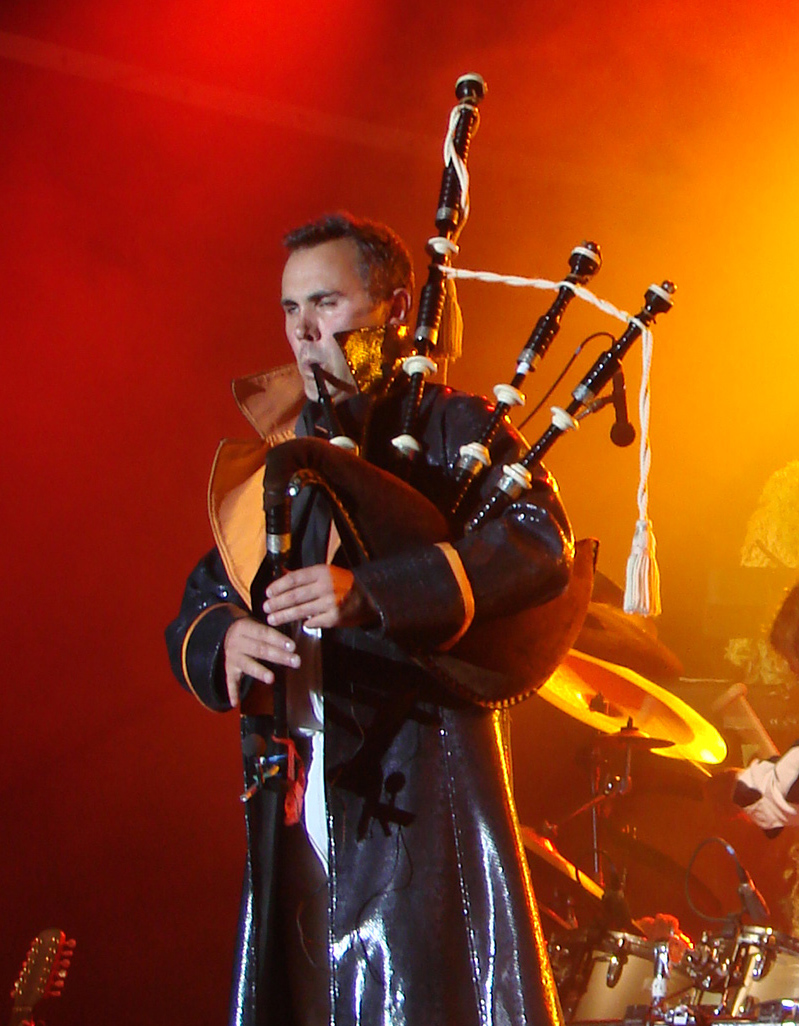
Konan Mevel, bagpiper of Tri Yann (band from Nantes)

The binioù bras (literally the "big binioù"), or Great Highland bagpipe, was imported in the late 19th century, and became popular in the 1930s. It is now used in solo performances, along with a bombarde in a duo, and as part of the bagad, a kind of pipe band.

The idea of the bagad comes from World War II: Breton soldiers saw pipe bands in Scotland, and brought the idea and instrument back with them to Brittany. There, they added bombardes along with the bagpipes drums and called the ensemble bagad ("company" in Breton). These ensembles gained in popularity in the 1950s, just before the folk revival began, and remain very popular to this day.

===== Binioù kozh =====
The binioù kozh is more traditional and predates the introduction of the highland bagpipes to Brittany. It was originally designed from the veuze in order to play in a higher register. Its pitch is higher and its chanter smaller than any other European bagpipe. Originally, it was common in the Breton-speaking area. It is often played as part of a duo with the bombarde, for dance accompaniment.

==== Bombard ====
The bombard (Breton, Fr. bombarde) is a conical-bore double-reed instrument similar to the oboe, and like an oboe uses reeds made of cane.

In its most primitive form the bombard has six open holes and possibly a seventh that is often closed with a key. It has a range of just over an octave. Bombards come in a number of keys, based on region or intended use. B-flat is a popular choice for those playing in a Bagad alongside the binioù braz (Scottish Highland pipes). In the contemporary setting bombards may also have complex simple system key-work enabling significant chromatic possibilities. In Breton, the bombard is also known as the talabard, and a bombard player as a talabarder.

The bombard has been in use since the 15th century, and has traditionally been played as part of a duo with the binioù kozh since the French Revolution. Later, in the 19th century, the binioù braz (highland bagpipe) was introduced to Brittany.

Biniou and bombarde duos include Jean Baron and Christian Anneix, Youenn Le Bihan and Patrick Molard, and Pierre Crépillon and Laurent Bigot.

In recent years the bombard has been paired and recorded with other instruments not traditionally associated with Breton folk music, such as the organ. Sacred music is well served by the clear, strong sound of the bombard, in combination with the traditional organ. The late Jegat and Yhuel are renowned for this use of the bombard.

==== Piston ====
Breton musician, teacher, and luthier Youenn Le Bihan invented the piston in 1983. The piston is a contemporary development of the hautboy or baroque oboe, influenced by the bombard. It is typically rooted in the key of D and features simple system key-work to expand its range. The tone of the piston stands in a warm and rich middle ground between the trumpet-like tone of the bombard and that of the baroque oboe.

== Breton pop music ==
Undoubtedly the most famous name in modern Breton music is Alan Stivell, who popularized the Celtic harp first in the fifties and sixties and on a wider level since the 1970s, with a series of albums including most famously Renaissance de la Harpe Celtique (1971). His first harps were built by his father; the Celtic harp was long forgotten in Brittany before.

In 1955, he began playing the bombarde, a smaller version of the double-reeded shawm (which later evolved into the oboe). Later, he took up the Scottish bagpipe and became pipe major. Alan Stivell began (in the mid-60s) recording Breton folk, Celtic harp, and other Celtic music, mixing influences from American rock and roll and the main musical genres.

Stilvell's performance at the Olympia Music Hall in Paris in February 1972 was broadcast live on Europe 1 radio to seven million listeners. Tri Martolod, Suite Sudarmoricaine, An Alarc'h, and Pop Plinn became famous hymns. The Olympia album sold 1,500,000 copies. If his work as composer, producer, and author has been recognized for its significance, so has been his work of promotion and communication to the major audiences, in Brittany, France, Europe and the English-speaking countries.

Stivell's most important contribution to the Breton music scene, however, has probably been his importation of rock and other American styles, as well as the formation of the idea of a Breton band. Stivell has made 22 albums and toured all over the world, influencing many musicians everywhere, experimenting with many different fusions (Rock, Jazz-rock, Blues, Symphonic, Indian, African, Electro, Hip-hop, etc.).

Inspired by Alan Stivell, a very large Breton scene grew up, especially after his Olympia concert in 1972. It was a true revolution: hundreds of bands, thousands of musicians, of Festoù-noz, etc. grew in the year after. Bands like Kornog and Gwerz arose, adapting elements of the Irish and Scottish Celtic music scene.

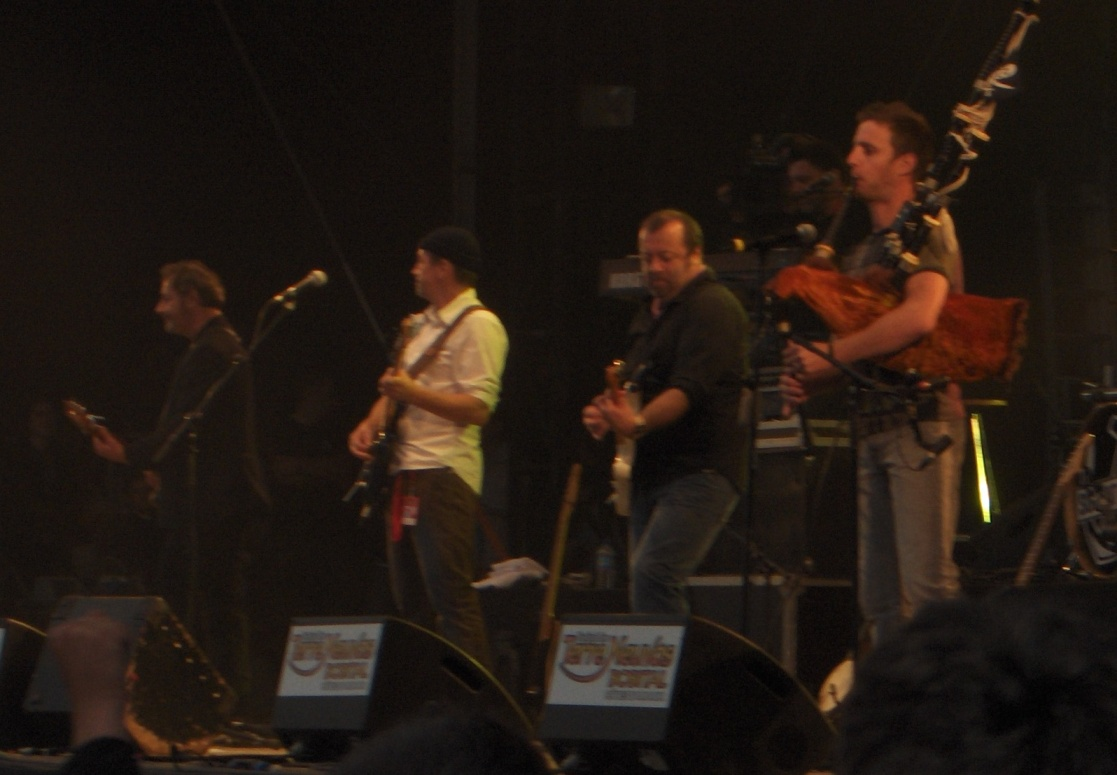
Soldat Louis at the Festival des Terre-Neuvas in Bobital, France, 2007

The most famous group of Breton musicians after Alan Stivell is Tri Yann, from Nantes (their original name is Tri Yann an Naoned, literally "the Three Johns from Nantes"). They formed in 1972 and still remain very popular, describing themselves as producing progressive rock-folk-celto-medieval music. They have produced some musical gems, now standards, like "Les filles des Forges", "Les prisons de Nantes", "La Jument de Michao", "Pelot d'Hennebont", and new interpretation of Irish music, like "Cad é sin don té sin", "Si mort a mors" (originally An Cailín Rua), "La ville que j'ai tant aimée" (from "The town I loved so well"), "Mrs McDermott" (from the 17th-century Irish harpist Ó Carolan) and "Kalonkadour" (from "Planxty Irwin").

Another famous band is Soldat Louis, from Port Louis, across the harbour from the city of Lorient. More rock-oriented, they play modern compositions about Brittany and life on the sea ("Du rhum, des femmes", "Martiniquaise", "Pavillon noir"). Also from the 80s, Ar Re Yaouank played lively driving folk rock songs with pro-Breton themes.

Red Cardell crosses over roots music from Brittany, Ukraine or North Africa with Rock and French realistic songs. Many times they play on stage with guests such as Dave Pegg (Fairport Convention, Jethro Tull), Jimme O'Neill (The Silencers), Dan Ar Braz, Dr Das (Asian Dub Foundation) or Stéfane Mellino (Les Négresses Vertes)... Their album "soleil blanc" has been recorded and mixed by the English producer Clive Martin (Queen, Sting, David Byrne...) Similarly, EV combined Finnish influences in their Breton folk-rock style, calling it Celto-Finnic rock.

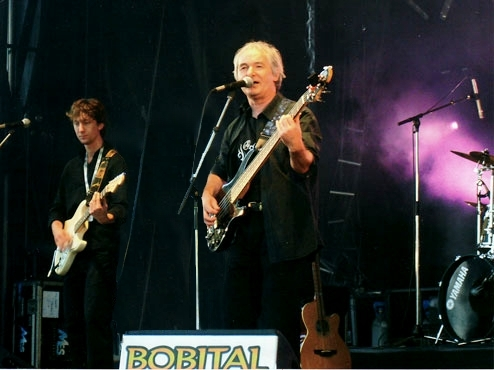
Gérard Jaffrès at the Festival des Terre-Neuvas in Bobital, France, 2008

Since then, a new scene of Breton songwriters appeared in Brittany (Gérard Jaffrès, Nolwenn Korbell, Dom Duff).

Les Ramoneurs de menhirs do Celtic punk, playing original songs, traditional ones and cover versions mostly in Breton.

Besides folk-rock, recent groups have included world music influences into their repertoires – especially younger groups such as Wig-a-Wag. Hip hop with a Celtic flavour has been espoused by groups such as Manau from Paris.

The band Merzhin uses traditional Celtic instruments along with electric guitars and bass. Their melodies and harmonies are inspired by Celtic music as well as by modern rock and roll.

In the US, the group Trouz Bras ("Big Noise") is led by Welshman Ray Price. The group is based in Rhode Island and features bombarde and Breton bagpipes. In Seattle, Washington a Fest Noz group called Sonerion features piston, bombard, guitar/bouzouki, accordion, and bass. In Austin, Texas, Poor Man's Fortune is well known for performing Breton music featuring biniou, bombarde, accordion, subois (similar to the "piston"), violin, flute and biniou braz.

Brittany hosts many annual rock and pop festivals, not related to traditional music. The biggest in Brittany and France, and one of the most important in Europe, is the Festival des Vieilles Charrues (held in late July in Carhaix, Finistère). See also the Route du Rock (mid-August, Saint-Malo) and the Transmusicales of Rennes, held in early December.

For its 2014 edition, the Festival des Vieilles Charrues (The festival of old plows) announces its new creation: The Celtic Social Club, a supergroup of seven Breton musicians and others, which included Jimme O'Neill (The Silencers), Ronan Le Bars (Héritage des Celtes) and the three members of Red Cardell.

=== Chanteurs engagés ===
A chanteur engagé (literally [ideologically] engaged singer) is a singer who is roughly analogous to a singer of protest songs. These songs are usually nationalistic and are celebrations of Breton culture. This is mostly a modern tradition, though some older songs of this type are known and the tradition stretches into the ancient past of Brittany. Chanteurs engagés are often also singers of more traditional material.

The first chanteur engagé to be quoted is the maverick Glenmor (1931–1996), or to give him his real name, Emile Le Scanf (or Milig Ar Skañv in Breton). He had some influence, mainly in the Breton movement and around, and on some newcomers as the best known, Gilles Servat, whose "La Blanche Hermine" has been a popular Breton anthem since the 1970s.

== Gallo ==
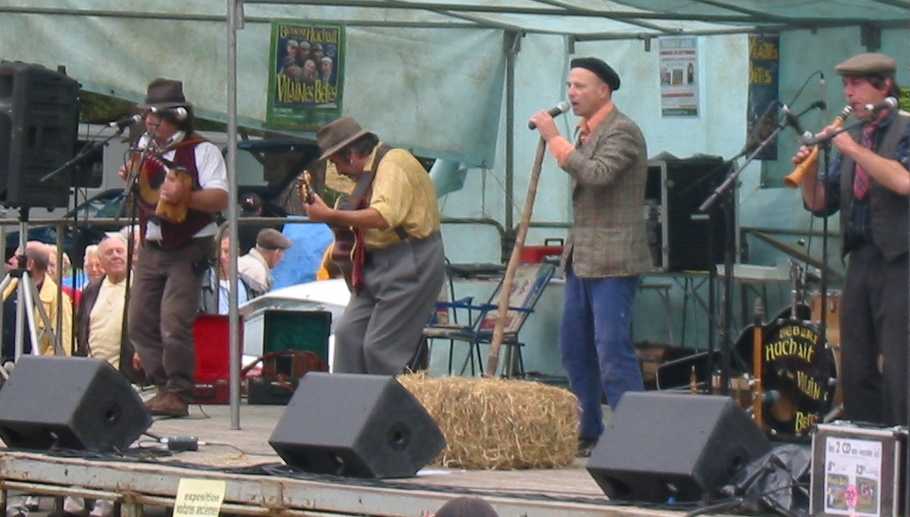
Bébert Huchait et les Vilaïnes Bétes singing in Gallo at Mont Dol in 2007

Though the Breton folk revival focused on songs in Breton, the Pays Gallo area of eastern Brittany has seen a more limited revival in repertoire in Gallo and produces singers and groups including Hamon-Martin Quintet, Ôbrée Alie, Yann Dour, while various bands, such as Tri Yann, perform a selection of Gallo songs.

== Breton artists ==
=== Breton singers and musicians ===
- Jean-Michel Alhaits
- Dan Ar Braz (guitar, voice)
- Andrea Ar Gouilh (voice)
- Anne Auffret (voice)
- Stéven Bodénès (bombard)
- Jorj Botuha
- François Budet

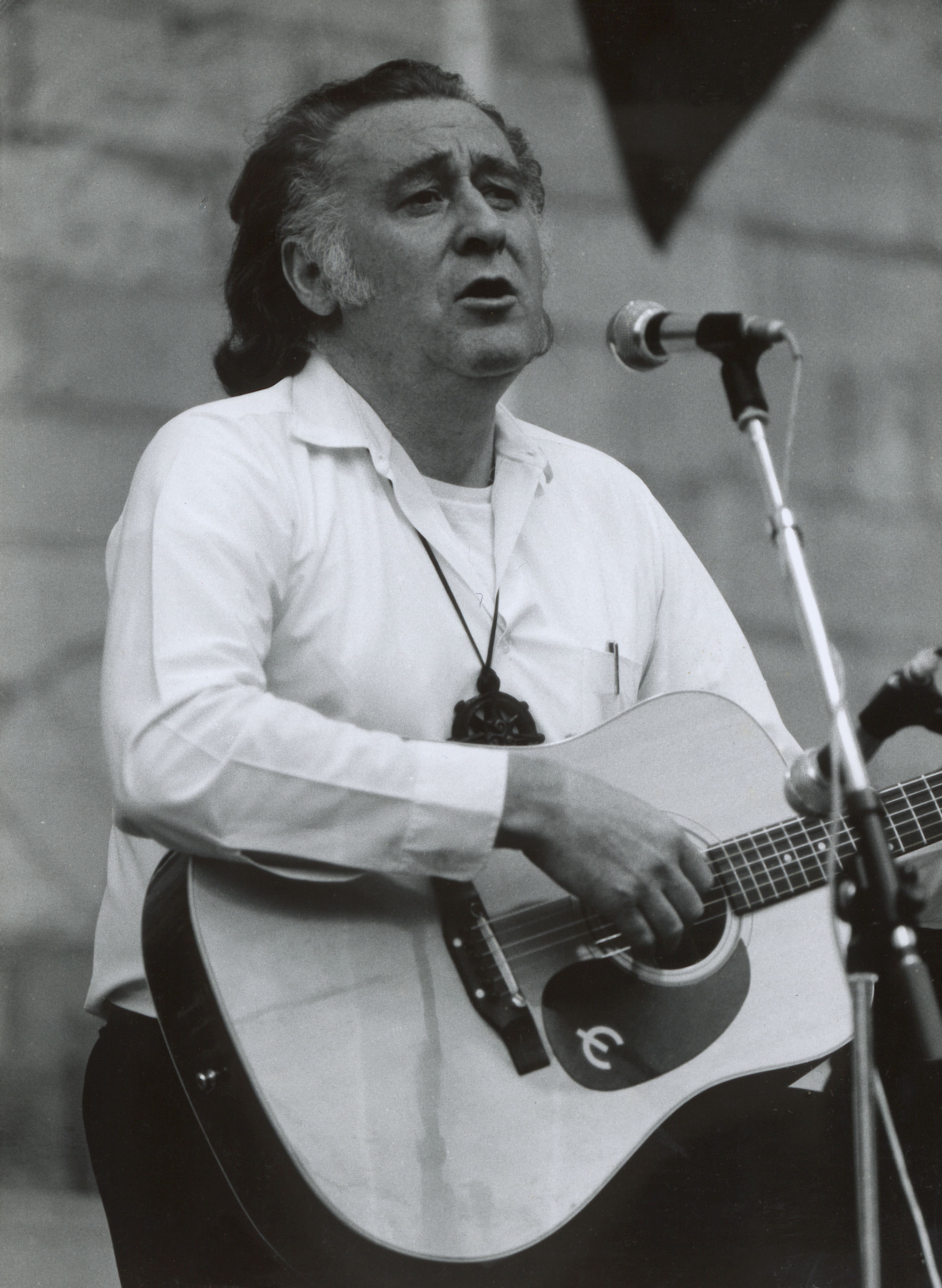
Youenn Gwernig.

- Kevin Camus (uilleann pipes)
- Louis Capart (voice)
- Jean-Michel Caradec (voice)
- Cécile Corbel (harp, voice)
- Dom Duff (voice)
- Didier Dréo (guitar)
- Annie Ebrel (voice)
- Louise Ebrel (voice)
- Yvon Etienne (voice)
- Yffig Flatrès (voice)
- Glenmor (voice)

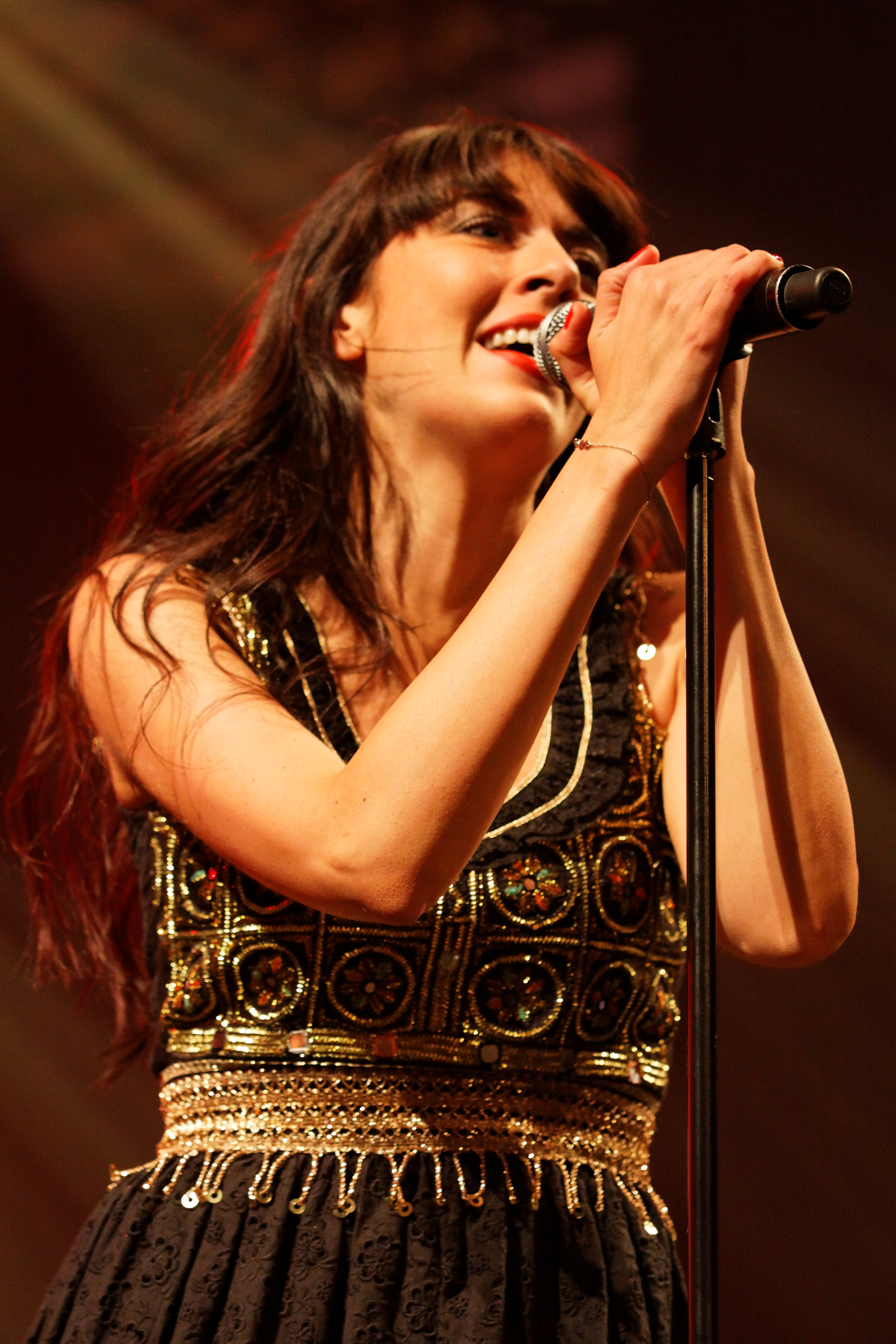
Nolwenn Leroy.

- Soeurs Goadec (Goadec sisters), (voices)
- Brieg Guerveno (guitar, voice)
- Frères Guichen (Guichen brothers), (guitar, accordion)
- Gwenynn (voice)
- Youenn Gwernig (voice)
- Gérard Jaffrès (guitar, voice)
- Yann-Fañch Kemener (voice)
- Nolwenn Korbell (voice)
- Krismenn (voice)
- Pascal Lamour (voice)
- Clarisse Lavanant (voice)
- Ronan Le Bars (uilleann pipes, Low whistle)

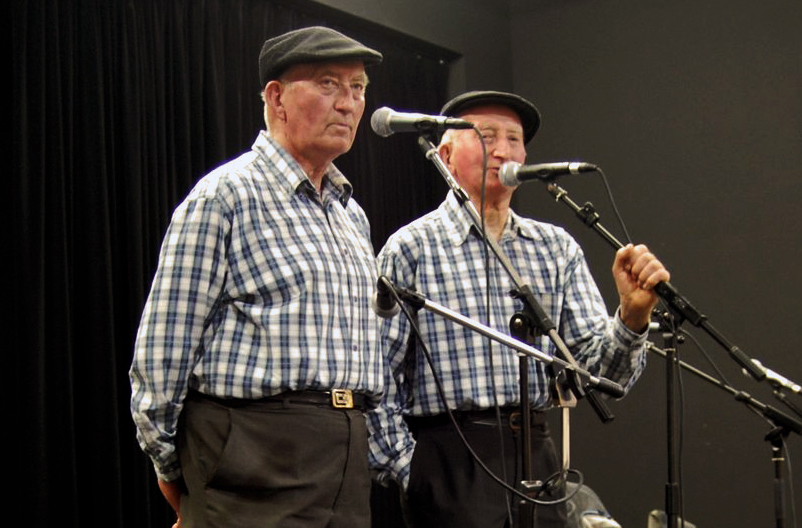
Frères Morvan.

- Jean-Louis Le Hénaff (bombard)
- Gilles Lehart
- Hervé Le Meur (bagpipe)
- Nolwenn Leroy (voice)
- Érik Marchand (voice)
- Patrice Marzin (guitar)
- Miss Blue (DJ)
- Christophe Miossec (voice)

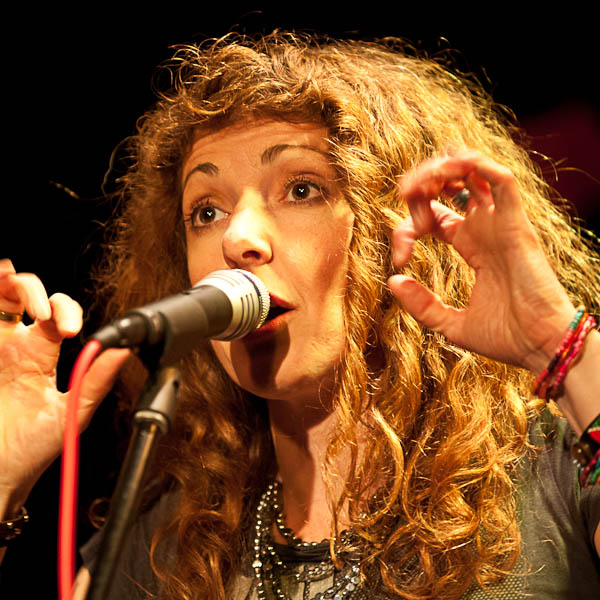
Nolwenn Korbell.

- Gildas Moal and Rene Chaplain
- Jean-Michel Moal (accordion)
- Jacky Molard (violin)
- Frères Morvan (voices)
- Kristen Nikolas (voice)
- Jacques Pellen (guitar)

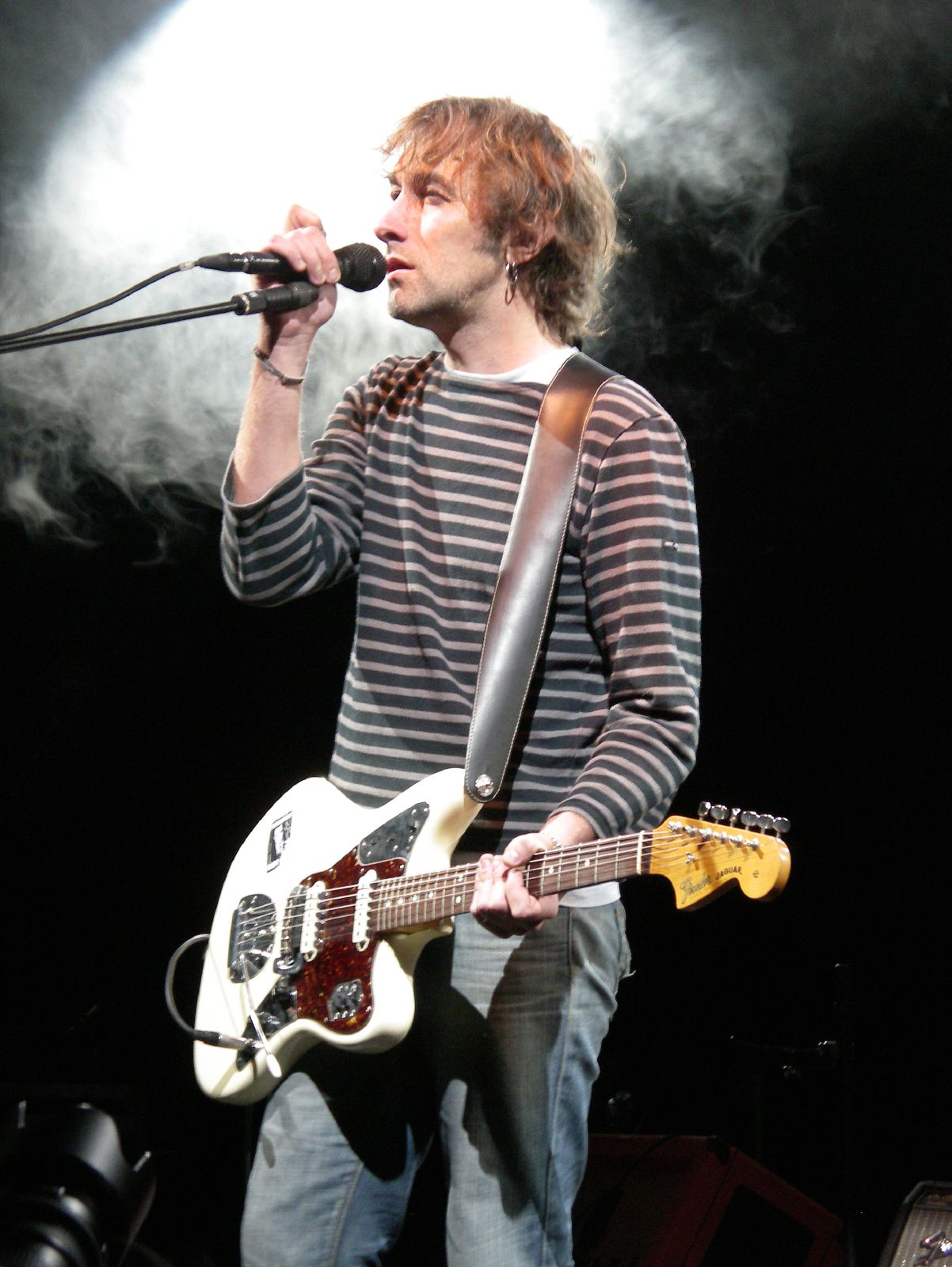
Yann Tiersen.

- Yann-Fañch Perroches
- Denez Prigent (voice)
- Loeiz Ropars (bagpipe)
- Erwan Roparz (bagpipe)
- Jean-Luc Roudaut (voice)
- Soig Siberil (guitar)
- Didier Squiban (piano)
- Alan Stivell (harp, bombard, voice)
- Bernez Tangi (voice)
- Yann Tiersen (violin, accordion, guitar)
- Michel Tonnerre (voice)
- Marthe Vassalo (voice)
- Jean Michel Veillon (flute)
- Wonderbraz (DJ)

=== Breton bands ===
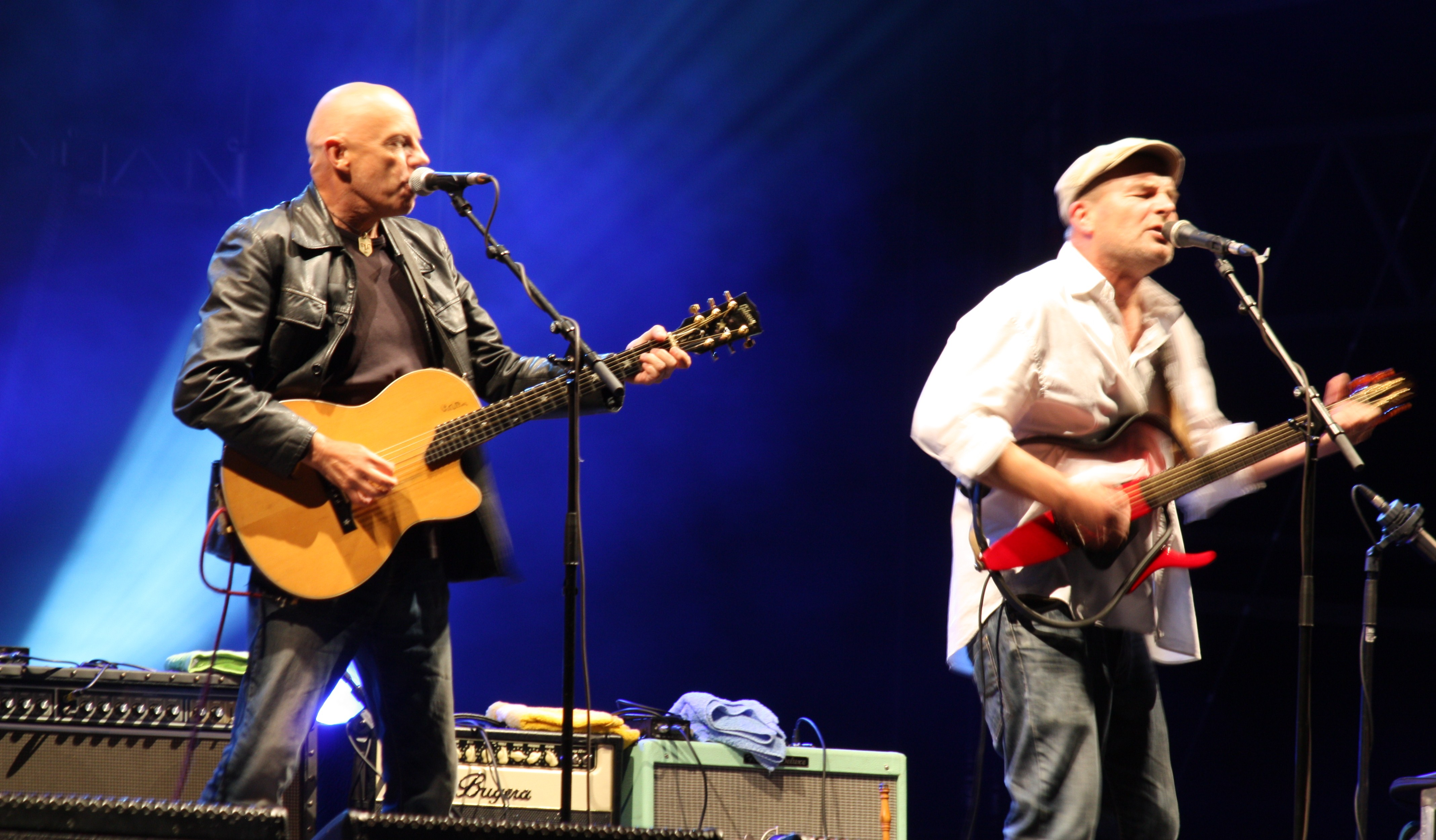
The Celtic Social Club.

- Armens
- Ar Re Yaouank
- Bleizi ruz
- Cabestan
- Carré Manchot
- The Celtic Social Club
- Daonet
- Diaouled Ar Menez
- Diwall
- Djiboujet
- EV
- Forzh Penaos
- Gweltaz Ar Fur
- Gwendal
- Gwenfol

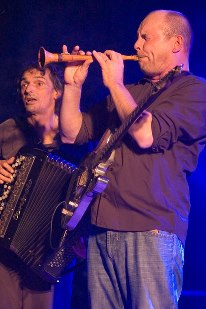
Red Cardell.

- Kern
- Kreiz Breizh Akademi
- Matmatah
- Merzhin
- Octopus Kafé
- Penn Gollo
- Plantec
- Les Ramoneurs de menhirs
- Red Cardell
- Skeduz
- Skolvan
- Soldat Louis
- Sonerien Du
- Startijenn
- Storlok
- Tri Yann

=== Breton bagads (pipe bands) ===
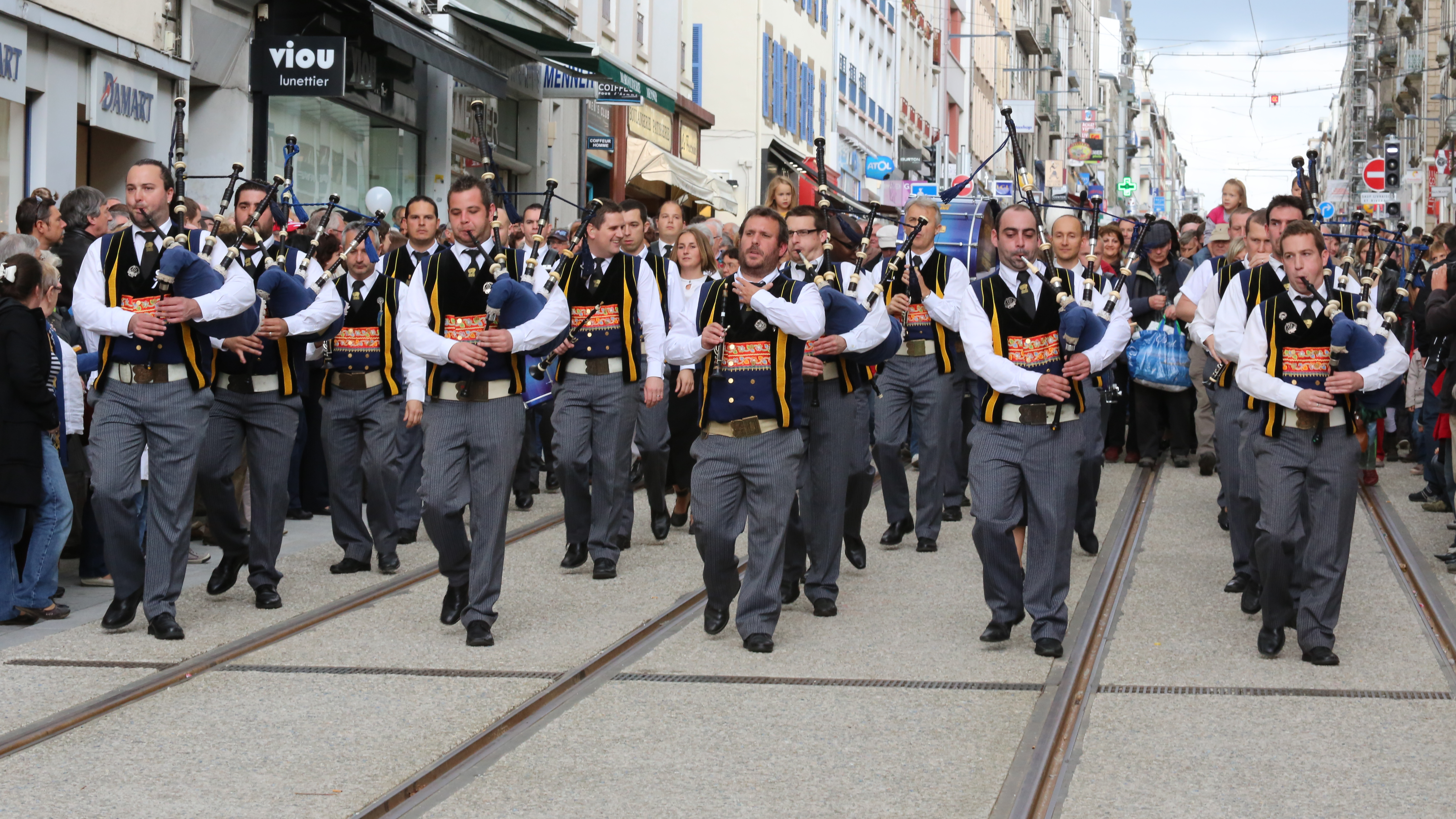
Bagad Kemper.

- Bagad An Hanternoz
- Bagad Ar Meilhoù Glaz
- Bagad Ar Re Goz
- Bagad Beuzeg ar C'hab
- Bagad Bleimor
- Bagad Blouarzel
- Bagad Brieg
- Bagad Bro Felger
- Bagad Bro Kemperle
- Bagad Bro Landerne

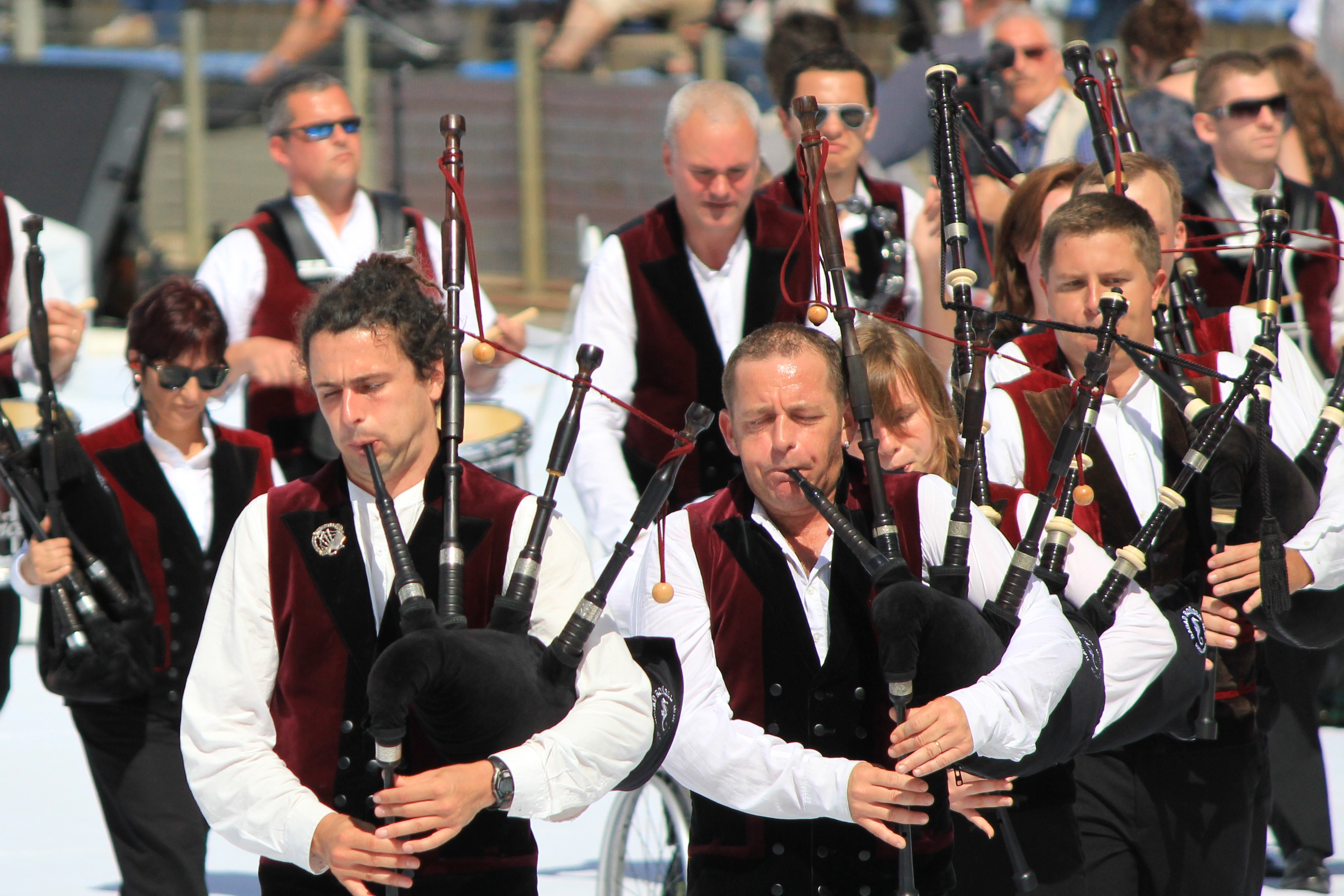
Bagad Roñsed-Mor.

- Bagad Cap Caval
- Bagad de Cesson-Sévigné
- Bagad Elven
- Bagad Eostiged Ar Mene
- Bagad Ergué-Armel
- Bagad Glaziked Pouldergat
- Bagad Gwengamp
- Bagad Kadoudal
- Bagad Karreg An Tan
- Bagad Karaez
- Bagad Kemper

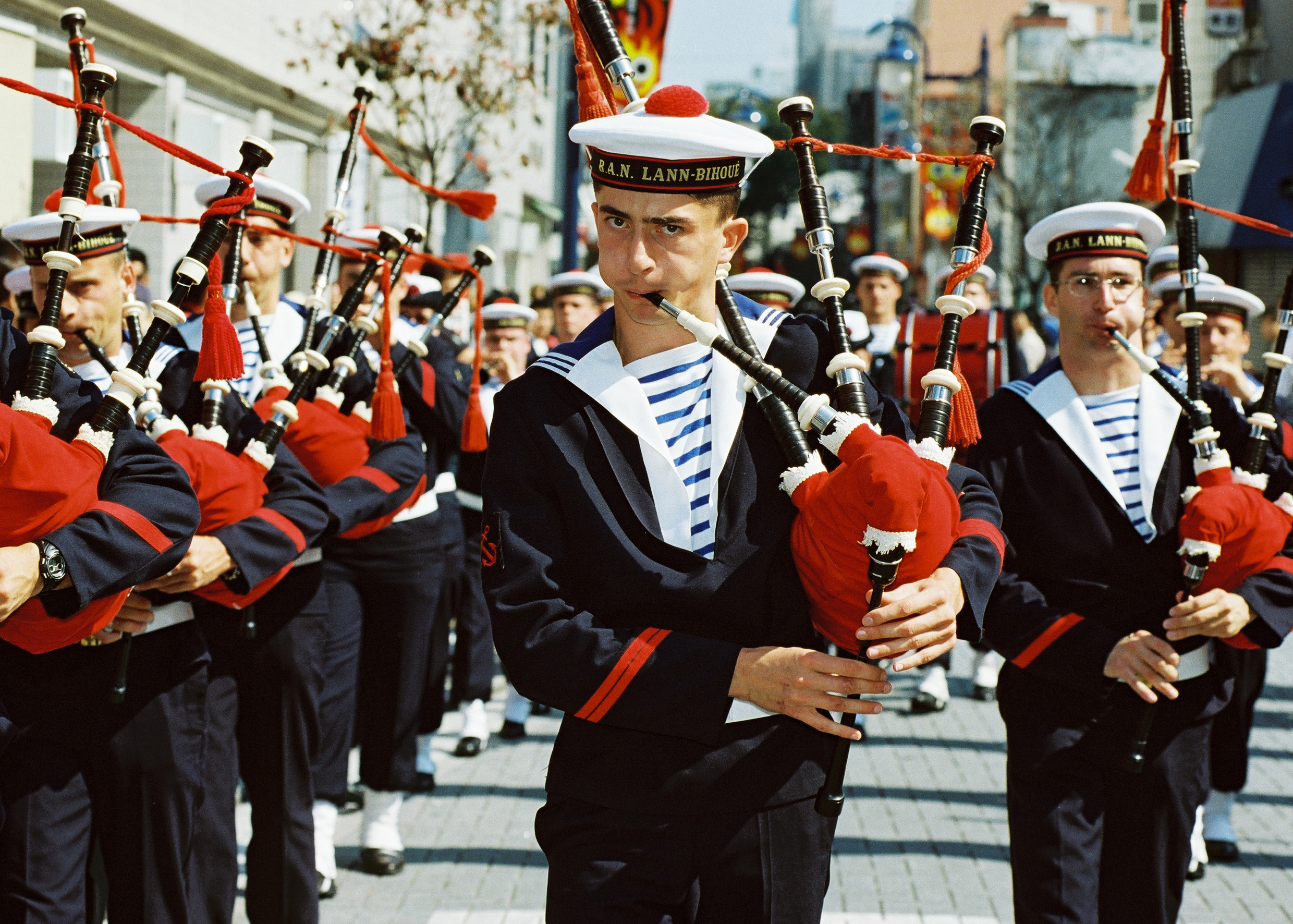
Bagad de Lann-Bihoué.

- Bagad Keriz
- Bagad Kerlenn Pondi
- Bagad Kevrenn Alre
- Bagad Kevrenn Brest Sant Mark
- Bagad Kombrid
- Bagad Konk Kerne
- Bagad Landi
- Bagad de Lann-Bihoué
- Bagad Melinerion
- Bagad Naoned
- Bagad Pãnvrid
- Bagad Penhars

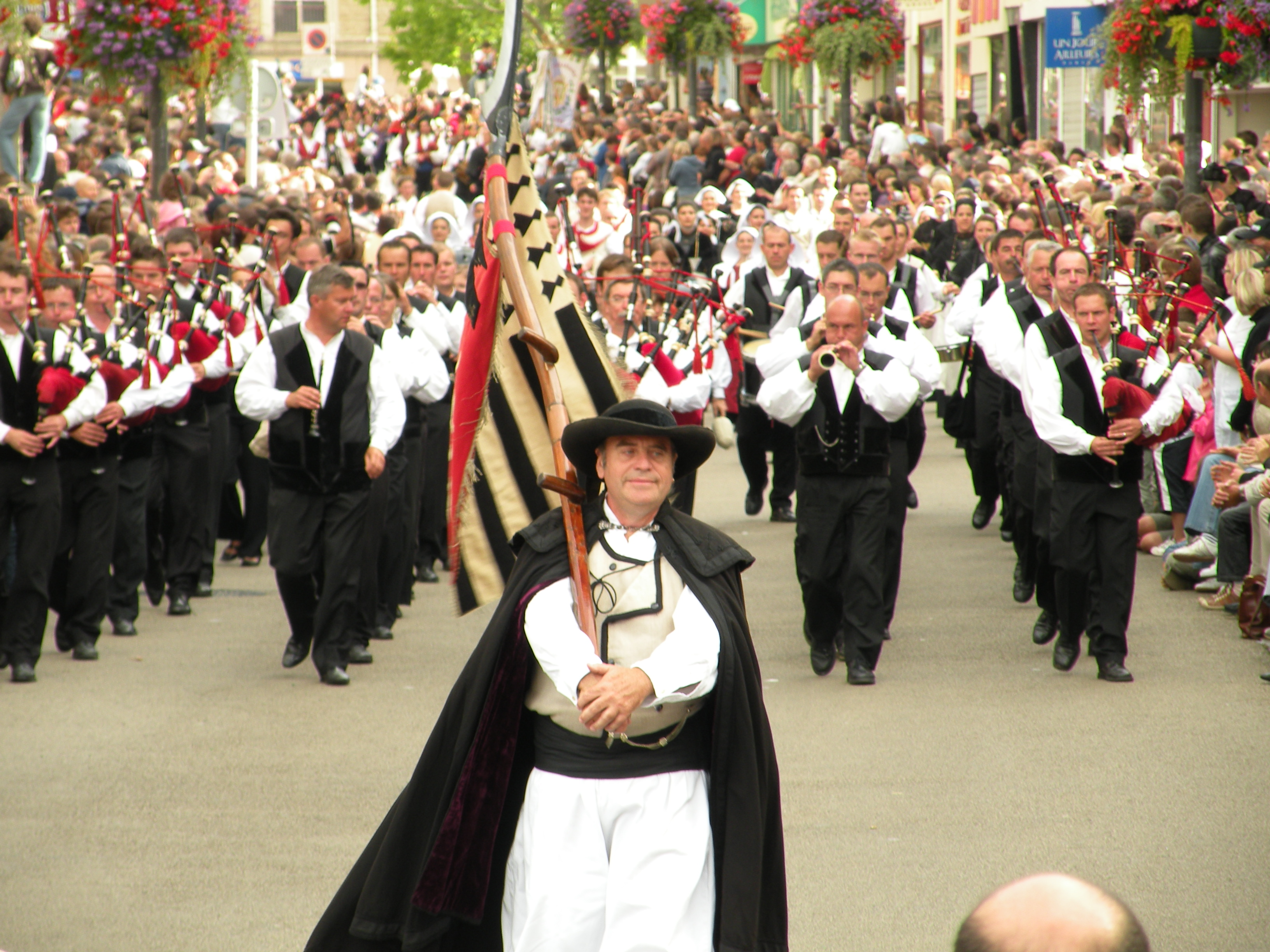
Bagad Kevrenn Alre.

- Bagad Plougastell
- Bagad Quic-en-Groigne
- Bagad Roñsed-Mor
- Bagad Sant-Brieg
- Bagad Saint-Nazaire
- Bagad Sonerien An Orient
- Bagad Sonerien Bro Dreger
- Bagad Spered An Avel

== Films ==
- Of Pipers and Wrens (1997). Produced and directed by Gei Zantzinger, in collaboration with Dastum. Lois V. Kuter, ethnomusicological consultant. Devault, Pennsylvania: Constant Spring Productions.
