= Kenavo =

Kenavo may refer to:

- Kenavo (word), Breton word for goodbye, also used outside Brittany
- Kenavo, song by Gérard Jaffrès on the album Au creux de ma terre, by Théodore Botrel or Gilles Servat
- Kenavo D, runner-up horse at Equestrian at the 1964 Summer Olympics – Team jumping
