= Kan ha diskan =

Type of traditional Breton music

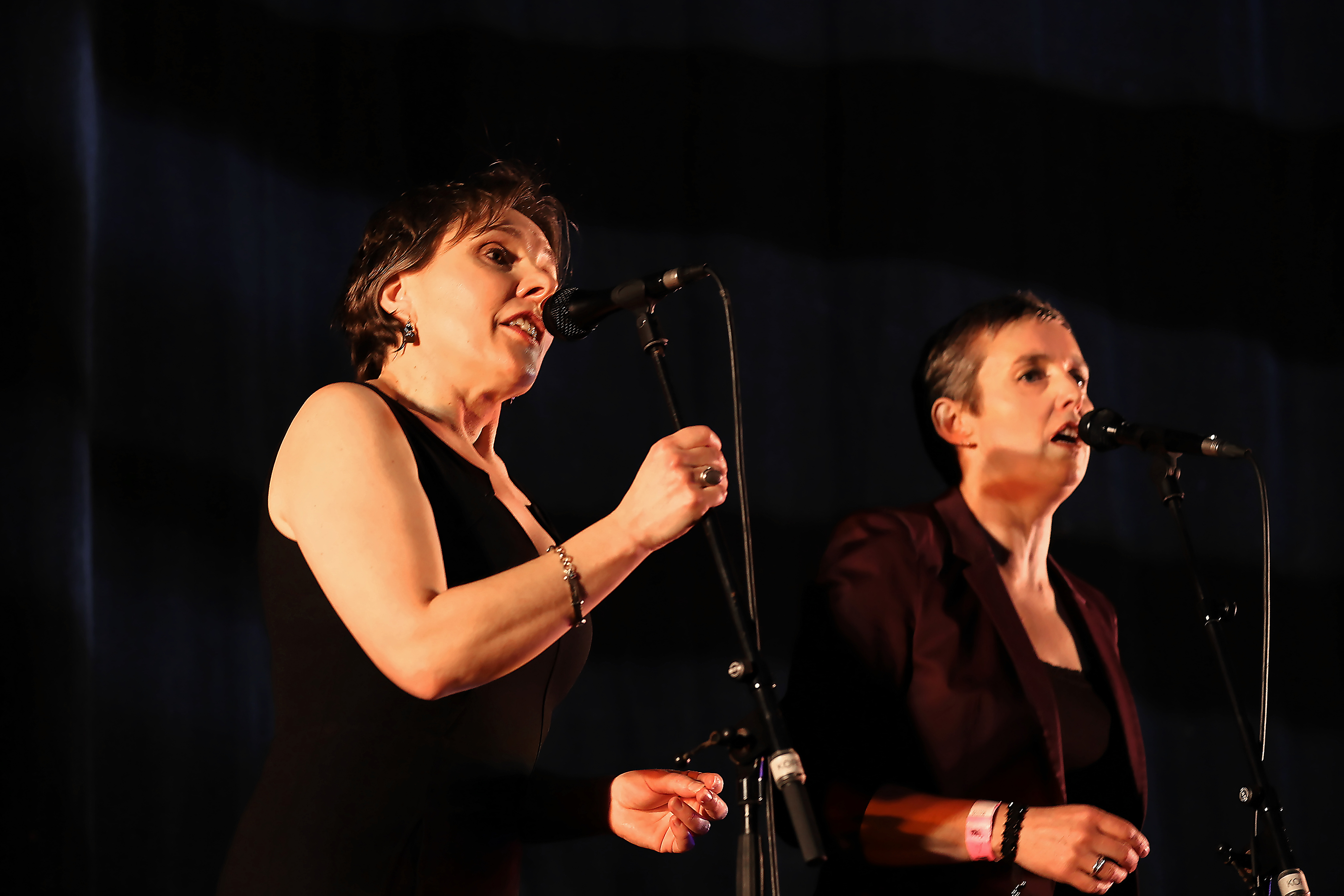
Annie Ebrel and Nolùen Le Buhé, famous singers in Fest Noz.

Kan ha diskan is one of Brittany’s best-known traditional vocal forms. Its name means roughly "song and counter-song" in Breton, reflecting its call-and-response structure. Closely associated with dance accompaniment, the style became a central feature of the Breton roots revival and was among the first forms of Breton music to reach wider audiences beyond the region.

The lead singer is the kaner, and the second singer is the diskaner. The kaner begins a phrase, and the diskaner joins for its final lines before repeating the phrase alone. The pattern continues as the kaner re-enters at the end of the repetition. Each repetition may vary slightly. Kan ha diskan songs can address any subject, but they must fit one of the meters used for Breton folk dances, especially line and round dances. Vocables, or nonsense syllables, such as tra la la la leh no, are sometimes used to lengthen lines. A kan ha diskan performance usually lasts from 5 to 20 minutes.

In addition to the Goadecs, the singer Loeiz Ropars largely responsible for maintaining kan ha diskan's vitality in the middle of the 20th century, and the 1960s and 1970s revivalists drew largely on his work. They also venerated performers like Les frères Morvan and Les soeurs Goadec. During the folk revival, aspiring musicians sought out elder teachers to learn kan ha diskan from, generally being viewed as successful when the student can act as diskaner to his mentor. Teachers of this era included Marcel Guilloux and Yann-Fañch Kemener.

An instrumental style similar to kan ha diskan is used by traditional Breton instrument players, particularly with the pairing of the biniou and bombarde.
