= Soldat Louis =

Celtic rock band from France

Soldat Louis are a French rock group originally from Lorient, who mix the traditional music of Brittany with typical rock music instruments - electric and acoustic guitar, drum kit, etc. - as well as the traditional bagpipes (biniou braz in Breton) and bombard. The two founding members, who are still playing in the group today, are Renaud Detressan (alias Gary Wicknam) and Serge Danet (alias Soldat Louis, “Soldier Louis”).

== History ==
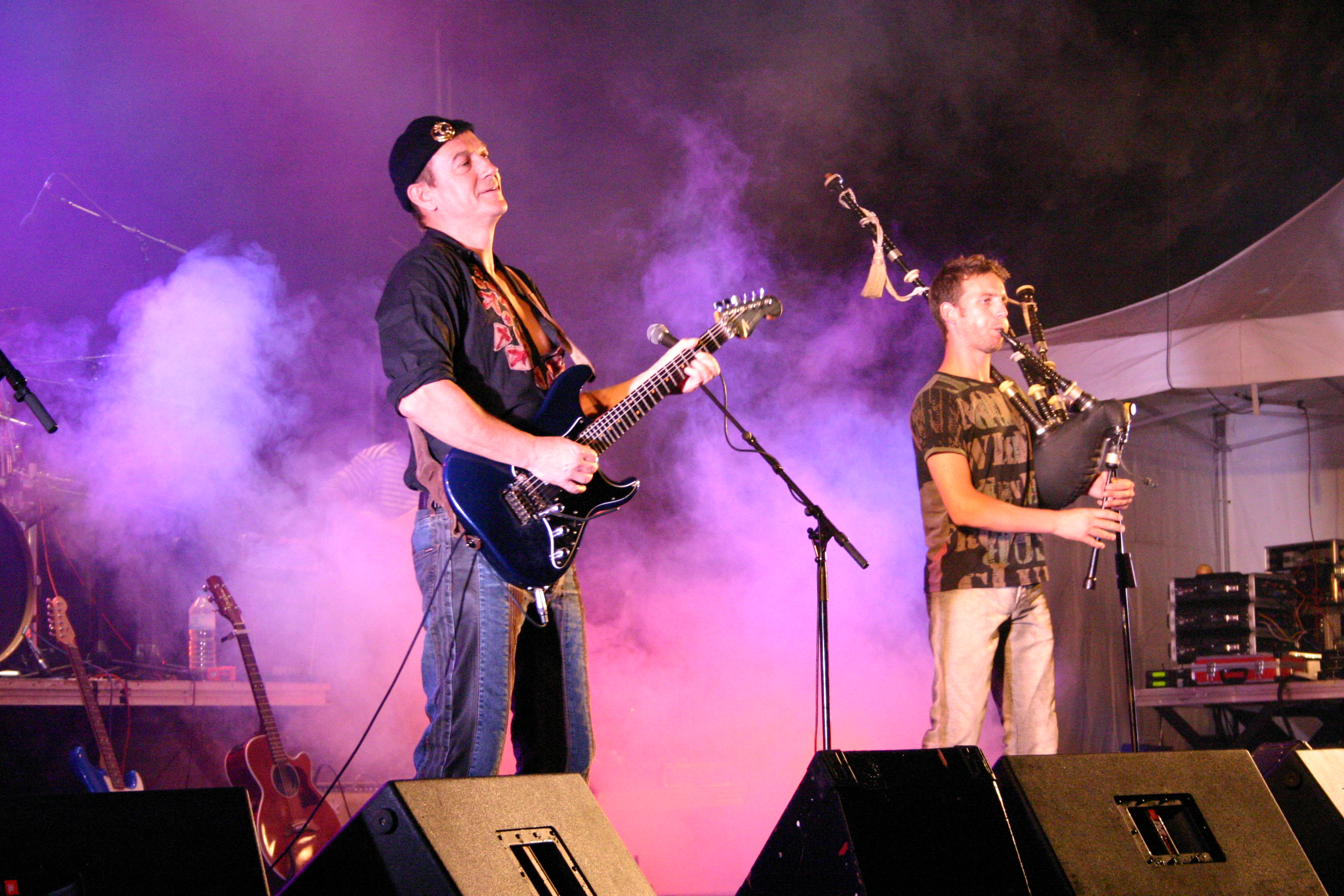
Aymon Folk Festival at Bogny-sur-Meuse in August 2004

Soldat Louis's first album, Première bordée appeared in 1988. The band played as support to the solo singer-songwriter Renaud, in his series of concerts at the Zénith in Paris the following year. The first single from that album, “Du rhum des femmes”, projected them to national exposure, with the single selling 750,000 copies, and the album went double gold. During the "golden age" of the French Top 50, chansons de comptoir (bar songs) were à la mode ("Allez viens boire un p'tit coup à la maison" etc.) and Soldat Louis found themselves associated with this musical style.

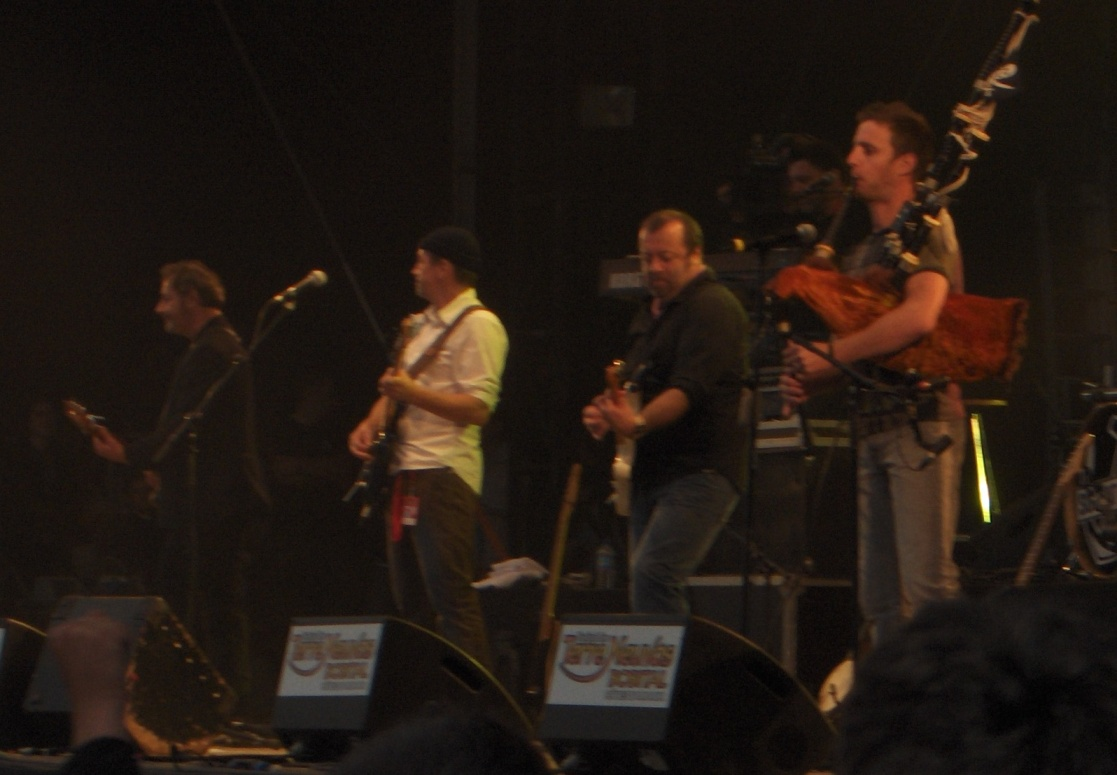
Soldat Louis at the Festival des Terre-Neuvas in Bobital, 2007.

Their second album was released two years after their first: "Pavillon Noir", however, did not achieve the same success, and nor did any of the albums that followed. Despite disappearing from the mainstream media, Soldat Louis continued, having changed their line-up (except for the two founding members), to tour concert halls around France, also releasing several more original albums, best-ofs and live albums.

== Song themes ==
Although the chanson "Du Rhum des femmes" saw the group labelled by the French public as composers of chansons à boire (drinking songs), the rest of their repertoire, which achieved less success, consists of more delicate songs ("Pavillon Noir"), nostalgic ("Encore un rhum"), humorous ("Martiniquaise"), or even weary ("T'es mon secret"). Other lyrics equally reveal the group to be politically engaged, such as the pamphlet-like “C'est un pays”, celebrating the Breton identity, as well as "Bobby Sands", about the Provisional Irish Republican Army member Bobby Sands, who died in prison on Hunger Strike.

== Personnel ==
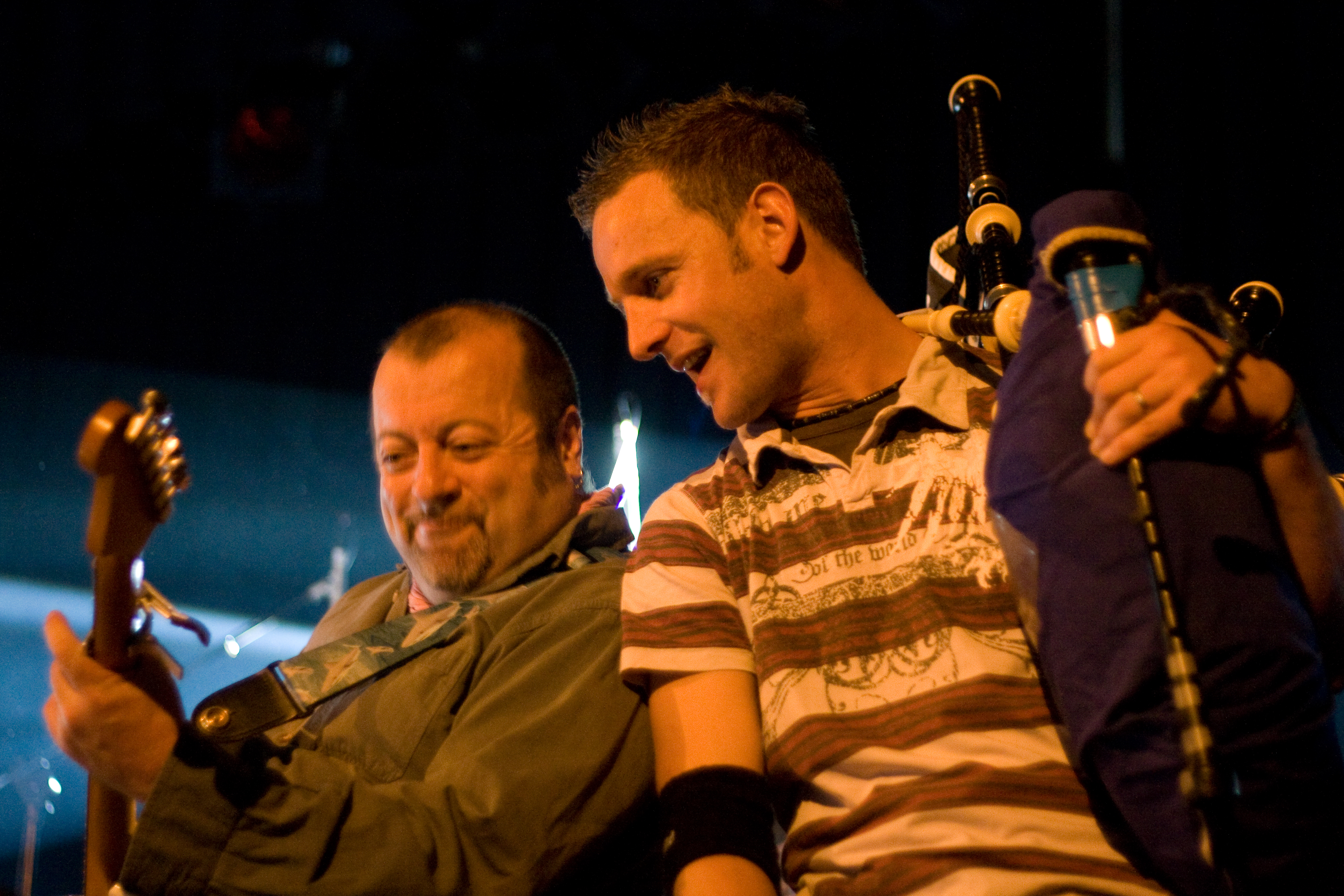
Michel Banuls and Anthony Masselin

- Anthony Masselin (bagpipes/uilleann pipes/flute)
- Christophe Sonnic (drums)
- Gary Wicknam (Renaud Detressan) (guitar/vocals)
- Hervé Le Guillou (bass)
- Jean-Paul Barrière (keyboard)
- Michel Banuls (guitar/vocals)
- Soldat Louis (Serge Danet)(lead guitar/banjo/lead singer)

== Discography ==
- 1988 : Première Bordée (Déclic - Sony Music}
- 1990 : Pavillon Noir (Déclic - Sony Music)
- 1993 : Auprès de ma Bande (Déclic - Sony Music)
- 1995 : Le Meilleur de Soldat Louis : C'est un pays (Déclic - Sony Music)
- 1997 : En Vrai (Déclic - Sony Music)
- 1999 : Bienvenue à Bord (Déclic - Sony Music)
- 2002 : En vrai 2 vrai (Créon Music - EMI Music)
- 2003 : Escale sur la Planète (Créon Music - EMI Music)
- 2006 : Sales Gosses (Atlantik - Aztec Musique)
- 2007 : Itinéraire (best-of Aztec Musique)
- 2009 : Happy... Bordée 20 ans (Coop Breizh)
- 2011 : V.I.P. : Very Intimes Poteaux (Coop Breizh)
- 2013 : Kingdom Tavern (Coop Breizh)
