= Marcel Guilloux =

French singer and storyteller (1930–2024)

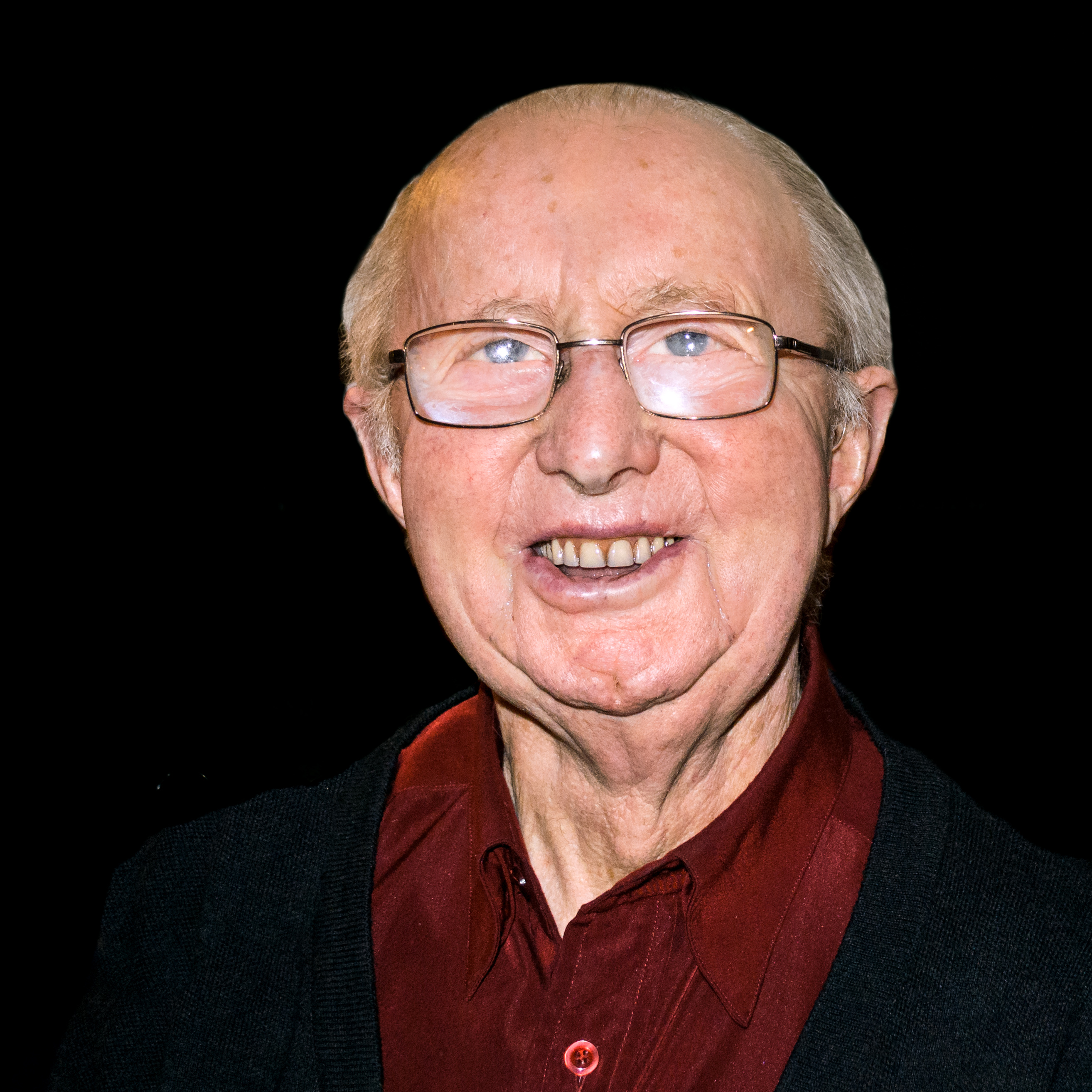
- Guilloux in 2016
- Born: 8 October 1930; Lanrivain, France
- Died: 11 June 2024 (aged 93); Saint-Nicolas-du-Pélem, France
- Occupations: Singer; Storyteller; Farmer

Marcel Guilloux (Breton: Marsel Gwilhou; 8 October 1930 – 11 June 2024) was a French singer and storyteller from Brittany. In addition to his career as a farmer, he was active in the Breton musical tradition of kan ha diskan and modern fest noz.

== Biography ==
Born in Lanrivain on 8 October 1930, Guilloux was the youngest of eight children. He taught himself how to play harmonica from a young age and learned the Breton language through his mother's teachings of catechism due to the fact that its teaching was banned in French schools. He grew up with vision problems, which prevented him from attending school until the age of 10. He then left school to work on his family's farm. His father died in an accident in 1953, leaving him the primary caretaker of the farm.

Guilloux began speaking Breton again in a Celtic circle made up of around 30 people in 1957. Although they spoke Breton with one another, they did not know the names for certain dances, instead singing in French during bal-musettes. With the revival of Breton culture following World War II, he helped organize dance competitions. He invited the bell ringers Georges Cadoudal and Étienne Rivoallan to participate in group dance weekly and accompanied them to the 1959 Championnat de Bretagne de Musique Traditionnelle in Gourin, where the pair won their first championship. In 1978, he began to participate in the Kan ar Bobl, for which he won an award in 2008.

In the 1960s, Guilloux appeared at multiple festù noz and created his own original dance songs. During the cultural revival of the 1970s, he played the kan ha diskan with friends such as Guillaume Jégou. He also told traditional Breton stories, teaching courses on the topic in La Chapelle-Neuve, Paris, Quebec, and Denmark. He taught the next generation of storytellers, such as Ifig Flatrès, Annie Ebrel, Denez Prigent, Marthe Vassallo, Nolùen Le Buhé, Yann-Fañch Kemener, and Érik Marchand. Kemener was his partner during the fest noz from 1979 to 1984. He became founding administrator of Radio Kreiz-Breizh in 1983.

On 16 October 2010, a celebration of Guilloux's 80th birthday took place. Every year, he would participate in the Plin du Danouët in Bourbriac since its foundation in the 1970s. He accompanied the Bagad Bourbriac during their performances of the fest noz. In 2019, Dastum and the Presses Universitaires de Rennes published a biography and CD on his work for the cultural heritage of Brittany titled Marcel Le Guilloux. Chanteur, conteur, paysan du Centre-Bretagne. In May 2022, he left his hometown of Lanrivain to live in a nursing home in Saint-Nicolas-de-Pélem. There, he died on 11 June 2024, at the age of 93.

== Decoration ==
- Officer of the Ordre des Arts et des Lettres (2015)

== Discography ==
- Kontadennoù (1991)
- Un devezh 'ba Krec'h Morvan (2004)
- Marcel Le Guilloux : Chanteur, conteur, paysan du Centre-Bretagne (2019)

=== With Yann-Fañch Kemener ===
- Kan ha Diskan - Chants à danser (1982)
- Vent d'Ouest (1985)
- Kan ha diskan (1997)

=== With Skolvan ===
- Kerz Ba'n' Dañs (1991)

=== Participations ===
- Bro vFañch - Cahier Dastum n°5 (1975)
- Kazetenn ar Vro Plinn, Journal parlé du pays Plinn de 1978 à 1981 (1981)
- Kan, Kan ar Bobl Duault 1988 (1988)
- Fañch ha Fisel - Danses du Centre-Bretagne (1994)
- Tre ho ti ha ma hini (1996)
- Gouez (2003)
- Festival Plinn du Danouët 2008 (2008)
- Festival Plinn du Danouët 2010 (2010)
- Annie Ebrel - 30 ans de chant (2013)
- Carré Manchot 30! (2016)

== Filmography ==
- Marsel, paotr-plaen (2010)
- Marsel Gwilhouz, ur skouarn da selaou (2010)
- Un nozvezh e Breizh (2016)
