= Kan ar Bobl =

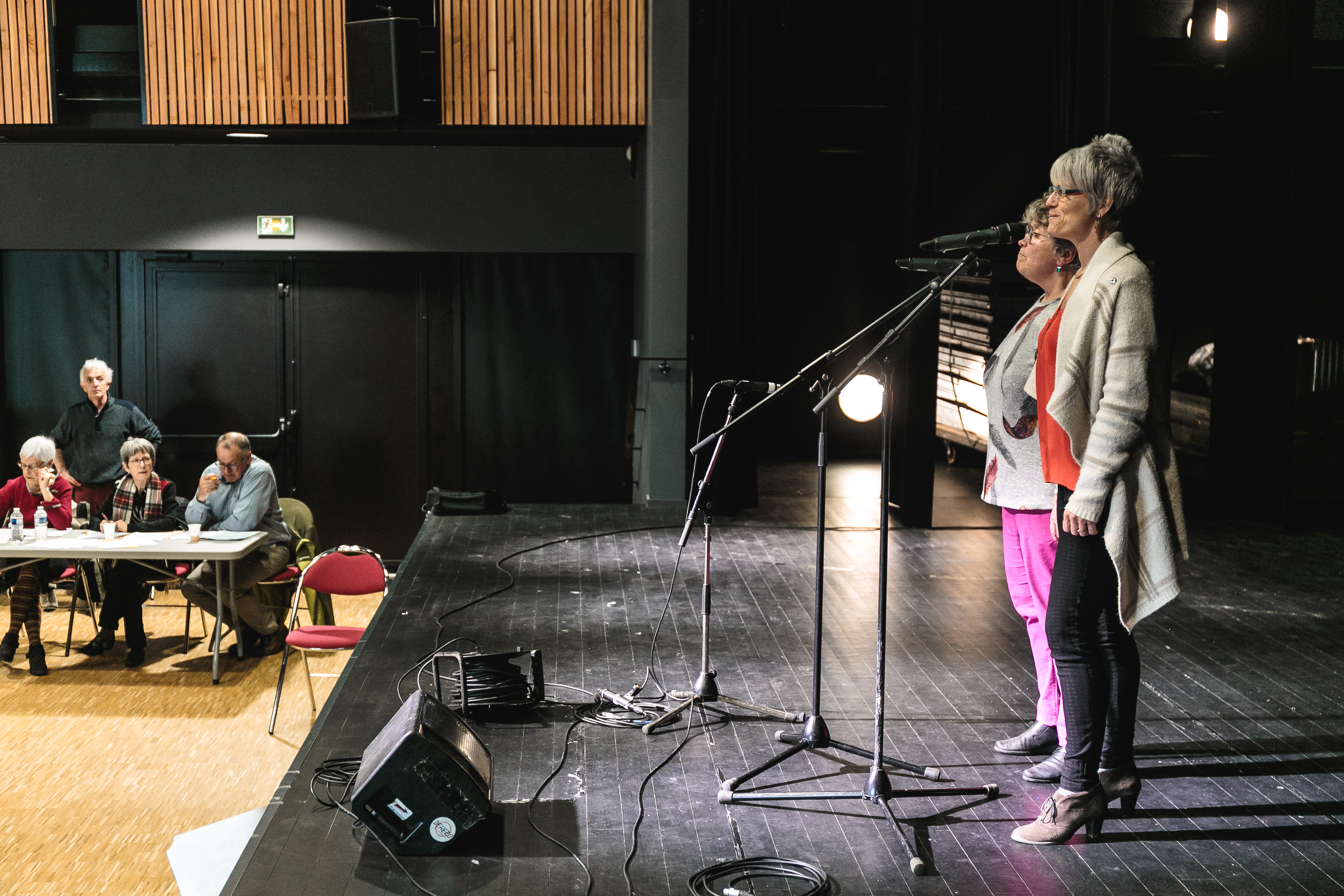
Two singers in Lesneven (preselections 2019).

Kan ar Bobl (Breton for Song of the people) is a Breton music competition created in 1973, that takes place in Lorient as part of the Festival Interceltique de Lorient. It was the brainchild of Polig Montjarret.

== Presentation ==
At the time of the festival's inauguration, Celtic music was quite popular, with Alan Stivell, Dan Ar Braz, Glenmor and Gilles Servat being big names in the field. Quickly, its success had put pressure on the organisers to hold local heats all over Brittany before the final (1975). This formula is still in use today, and offers the advantage that only the best musicians can play at the final. Since 1993, the festivities have been held in Pontivy (Morbihan), and in 1997 it was passed into the hands of its eponym. Since 1990, a "Grand Prix of Kan ar Bobl" is given to the winners of different competitions. In 2005, the Kanit ta bugale trophy was set up, in honour of Polig Montjarret, who died in 2003.

The Kan ar Bobl festival marks an important date in the Breton cultural diary as it boasts a meet-up of hundreds of musicians and singers in the region who play an active part in the conservation of Brittany's rich musical heritage. Many bands have been formed after meeting there, including Storvan, Denez Prigent, Yann-Fañch Kemener and Ar Re Yaouank.

== The competition ==
The Kan ar Bobl's aim is to conserve and transmit musical patrimony throughout different areas of Brittany, but also to inspire new original forms. The heats take place in different areas of Brittany, and the participants must perform in front of judges. The musicians may compete in more than category, and may even perform in different locations if needs be.

The chosen artists take part in the final, held in Pontivy where they must perform again.

== Main categories ==
- Traditional song
- Creation
- Tales
- Duets
- Solo Instruments
- Music groups
- School groups
