= Ar Re Yaouank =

Breton band

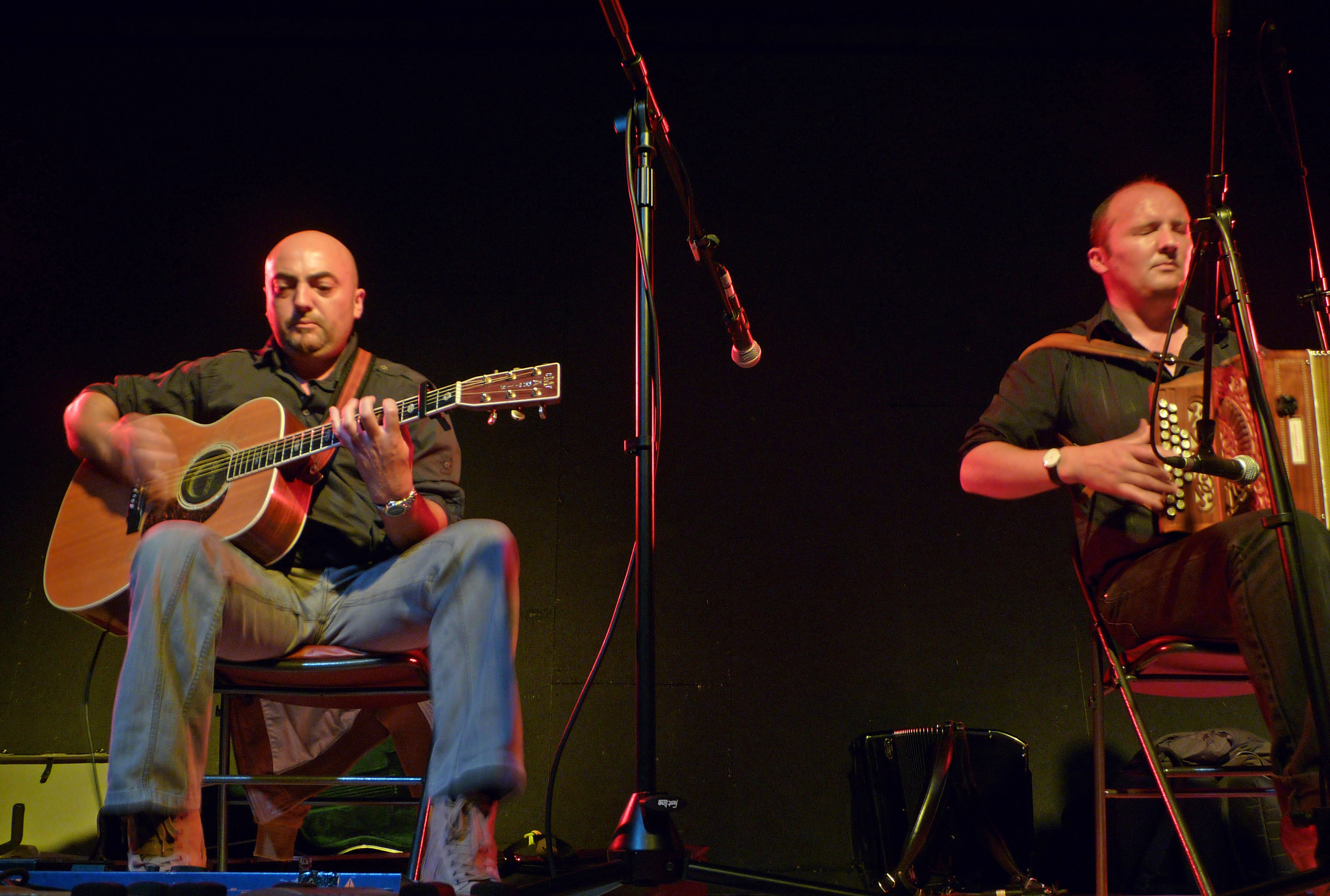
Jean-Charles Guichen and Frédéric Guichen, the founders

Ar Re Yaouank (Breton pronunciation: [aˈʁeː ˈjɔwːãŋ(k)]; lit. 'The young ones') is a Breton band, established in 1986 by two brothers born in Quimper, Brittany, northwestern France, Fred and Jean-Charles Guichen (16 and 14 years at that time) playing the diatonic accordion and the acoustic guitar respectively. They were joined in 1987 by Gaël Nicol (bombard and bagpipes), David Pasquet (bombards), then in 1990 by Stéphane De Vito playing the electric bass.

With the energy of the rock, while respecting the spirit of the traditional tunes, they add a very fast rhythm, bringing dancers in the trance. Thus, they revitalized the Fest Noz (night festival), attracting the young audience and new followers. The group disbanded in 1998, and each continued to evolve in the Breton music, with various bands. The Brothers Guichen mainly worked as a duo under their own name.

== History ==
=== Reformation ===
On 14 July 2011 the group agreed to re-form exceptionally and to open the 20th edition of the Vieilles Charrues Festival, on the main stage, in front of 40,000 spectators, dancing the an dro and gavottes. During a private party for the meal of the volunteers of the Vieilles Charrues Festival in January 2012, the band played together a second time. It also re-formed a third time on 23 November 2013 during the Yaouank Festival, in front of more than 8,000 dancers

== Discography ==
=== Studio albums and live ===
- 1989: Sidwel
- 1992: Fest-Noz Still Alive
- 1994: Breizh Positive
- 1996: Trivet Act (Act 3)

=== Participations ===
- 1995 : Kleg Live

=== Compilations ===
- 1998: Best of
- 2013: L'intégrale ("The Complete", 4 CDs Coop Breizh)
