= Gérard Jaffrès =

French musician (born 1956)

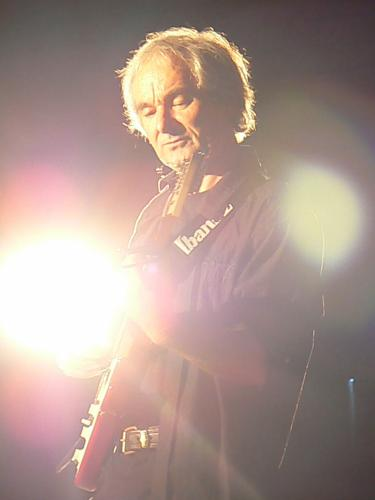
- Gerard Jaffrès in concert

Background information
- Born: 15 December 1956 (age 69); Saint-Pol-de-Léon, Brittany, France
- Genres: Celtic rock, Breton music
- Occupations: Singer, songwriter
- Instruments: Vocals, guitar
- Years active: 1985–present
- Labels: Kelou-Mad, Coop Breizh
- Website: gerardjaffres.com

Gérard Jaffrès (born 15 December 1956 in Saint-Pol-de-Léon) is a French singer, writer and performer.

He started playing the guitar at the age of 15, playing mostly folk repertoire (Alan Stivell, Tri Yann...) and rock music (Deep Purple, Led Zeppelin...). In 1973, he joined Burt Blanca's band. He stayed with it for 11 years as a bass player. The same year, he moved to Belgium, his current home.

Jaffrès started a solo career in 1985, recording ten discs with gramophone records. He has published a new album every two years since 1991.

Jaffrès' music is a blend of Celtic music and rock'n'roll/folk which he uses to depict the landscape of Brittany and tell legends from the area of Leon (North Finistère). His texts sometimes mix Breton and French.

== Discography ==
- Capitaine de Galère, 1991
- Les Soldats de Pierre, 1993
- Kérichen 72, 1995
- Les Années Baluches, 1997
- Au Creux de ma Terre, 1999
- Le Fou de Bassan, 2001
- Viens dans ma maison, 2003
- Le Beau Voyage, 2005
- Mon Pays t'attend, 2007
- Nos Premières Années, 2008
- Gérard Jaffrès En Public, 2010 (Live CD DVD)
- Mystérieuses Landes, 2012
- Je sais d'où je viens, 2016
- 2020, 2020
