= Jacky Molard =

Breton musician (born 1961)

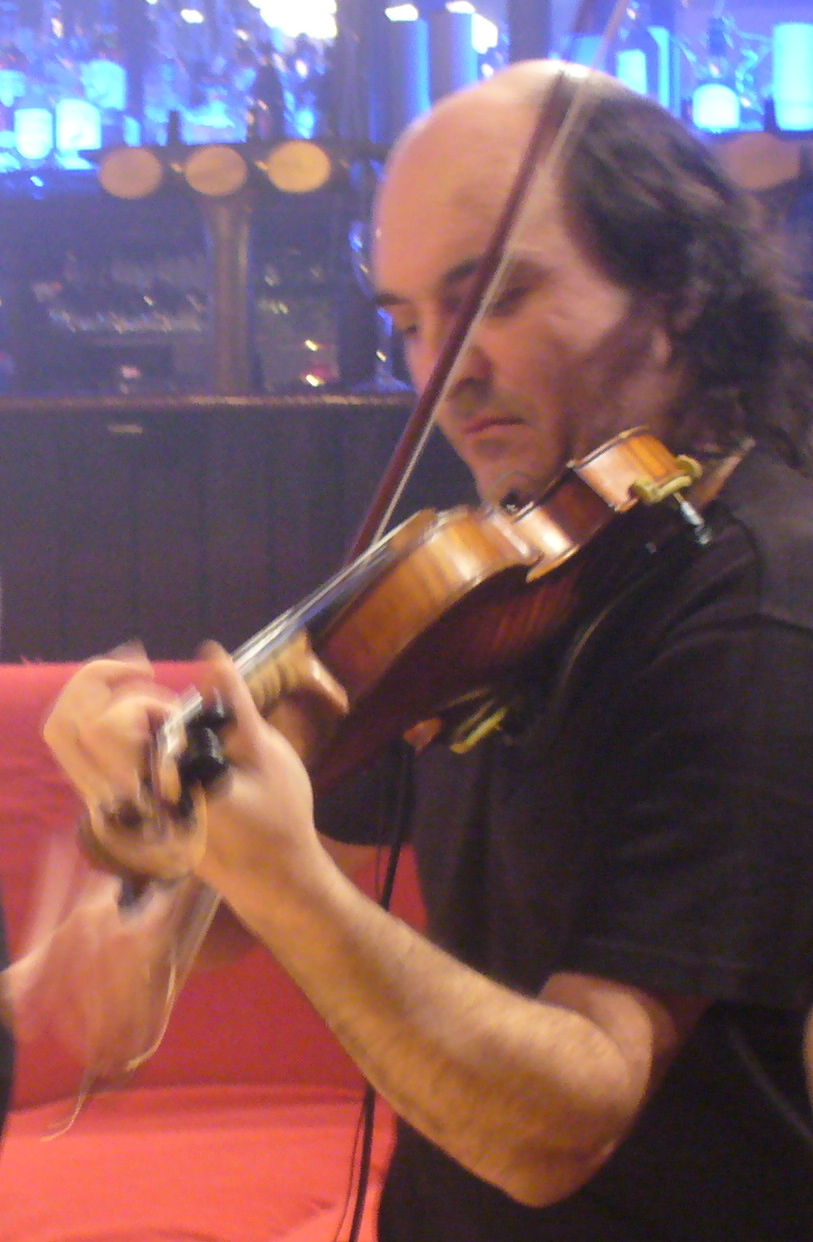
Molard in 2010

Jacky Molard (born 1961) is a Breton musician known for performing Breton folk music. He plays violin, fiddle, guitar and bass. He is or has been a member of Gwerz, Pennoù Skoulm, the Jacky Molard Acoustic Quartet, and has also played in various groups with Érik Marchand such as Taraf de Caransebes. He is also a composer and producer. Jacky created the "Innacor" Breton/World music label in 2005 along with Érik Marchand and Bertrand Dupont. He has also worked with musicians outside Brittany such as Foune Diarra.

== Discography ==
=== Solo ===
- Acoustic Quartet (2007)

=== Jacky Molard Quartet ===
- Suites (2012)

=== Appears on ===
- Kerden: Cordes de Bretagne (1998)
