= The Goadec Sisters =

Breton vocal trio

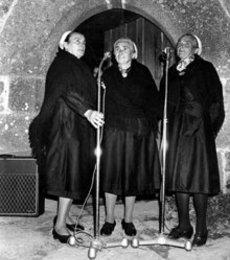
The Goadeg Sisters

The Goadec Sisters (Ar C'hoarezed Goadeg in Breton), usually known as Les sœurs Goadec in French, were a Breton vocal group originating from Treffrin (Côtes d'Armor, France). The trio embodied the traditional music of Brittany, singing a cappella. The three sisters were Maryvonne (1900–1983), Eugenie (1909–2003) and Anastasie Goadec (1913–1998). They began to perform at fest-noz (evening dances) in 1956, among the pipers and bombard players. Accompanied until 1964 by their two sisters, Louise (1903–1964) and Ernestine (1911–1964), their repertoire mainly consisted of laments (gwerzioù in Breton). As a trio, they attempted to adapt their singing to dance and developed a new form of call and response singing (kan ha diskan).

The Breton revival, Celtic rock and the popularity of folk music put them in the spotlight in 1972–1973, following Alan Stivell, one of their biggest admirers. The three sisters contributed much to Breton culture and its sustainability. Over several recordings they transmitted a vast repertoire of songs and techniques specific to Breton folk singing.

Eugénie Goadec's daughter Louise Ebrel (1932–2020), and Louise's second cousin Annie Ebrel (b. 1969), were and are respectively also traditional Breton singers.

== Links ==
- Discogs
