= Annie Ebrel =

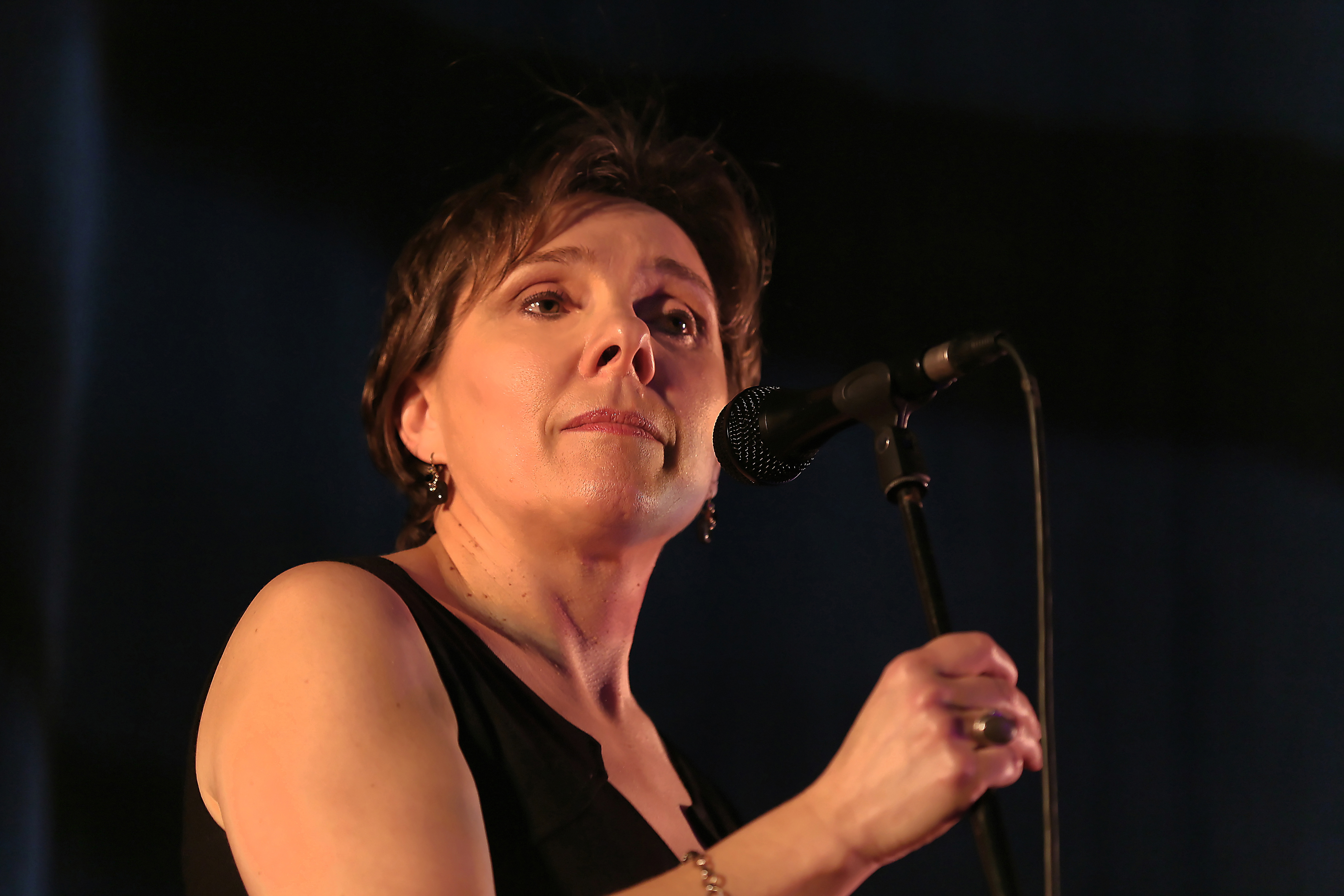
- Annie Ebrel (2015)

Background information
- Born: 1969 (age 55–56); Lohuec, Callac, Brittany, France
- Genres: Music of Brittany including (Kan ha diskan, Gwerz)
- Occupation: Musician
- Instrument: Voice
- Years active: (1983–present)
- Labels: Coop Breizh
- Website: annie-ebrel.com

Annie Ebrel (born 1969) is a traditional Breton singer of traditional Kan ha diskan (dance songs) and Gwerz (ballads).

== Background ==
Ebrel comes from the historic Cornouaille region in Brittany (here, in the time of the Ancien Régime France)

Annie Ebrel was born in 1969 in the village of Lohuec, near Callac, Côtes-d'Armor department, part of the historic region of Cornouaille, Brittany, France, to a family of farmers.

Through her grandfather Jean Ebrel, she is the second cousin of Louise Ebrel, who is a daughter of Eugénie Goadec, one of The Goadec Sisters.

== Career ==
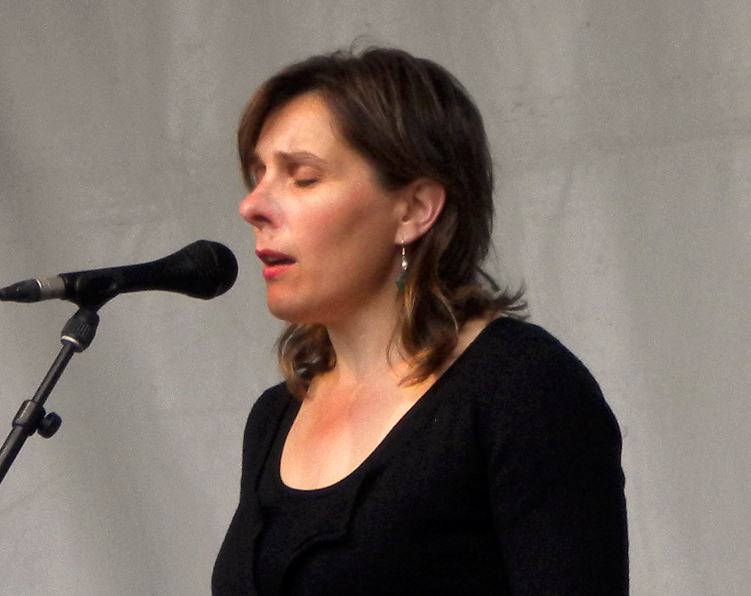
Annie Ebrel (2011)

In 1983, Ebrel began learning her craft with Yannick Larvor as well as singers Marsel Gwilhou (Marcel Le Guilloux) and Louis Lallour..

In 1989, Ebrel participated in the album Aux sources du Barzaz Breizh, which brought her to public attention. In 1992, she performed with Voix de Bretagne, which showcased three generations of Breton artists. In 1996, she began performing with Italian double-bassist Riccardo Del Fra. Most often, Ebrel performs with other artists, both singers in a cappella and musicians. However, in 1995, Ebrel released her first solo album Tre ho ti ma hini and in 2004 created the solo show Une Voice Bretonne (A Breton Voice).

In 2012, Ebrel performed with the Annie Ebrel Quartet including Pierrick Hardy, Olivier Ker Ourio, and Bijan Chemirani.

In 2013, Ebrel celebrated her career of three decades with a performance in Saint-Nicodème, resulting in an album 30 ans de chant.

Festivals where Ebrel performed including the Vieilles Charrues Festival (1999), Festival de Cornouaille (2014), and Fest Noz (2015).

In 2018, Ebrel performs twice on the BBC Alba Port episode on Brittany, singing the Gwerz (ballad) "Robardig," accompanied by Mischa MacPherson as well as hosts Julie Fowlis and Muireann Nic Amhlaoibh, and then "Une dispute" (An Argument) as second voice to Érik Marchand.

Ebrel continues to perform, mostly in Brittany, France, Celtic areas like Scotland, as well as Spain, Italy, Scandinavia, Canada, and the USA.

Ebrel is the subject of "Annie Ebrel, ou «une chanteuse traditionnelle bretonne»?" by François Picard of the Sorbonne University.

== Works ==
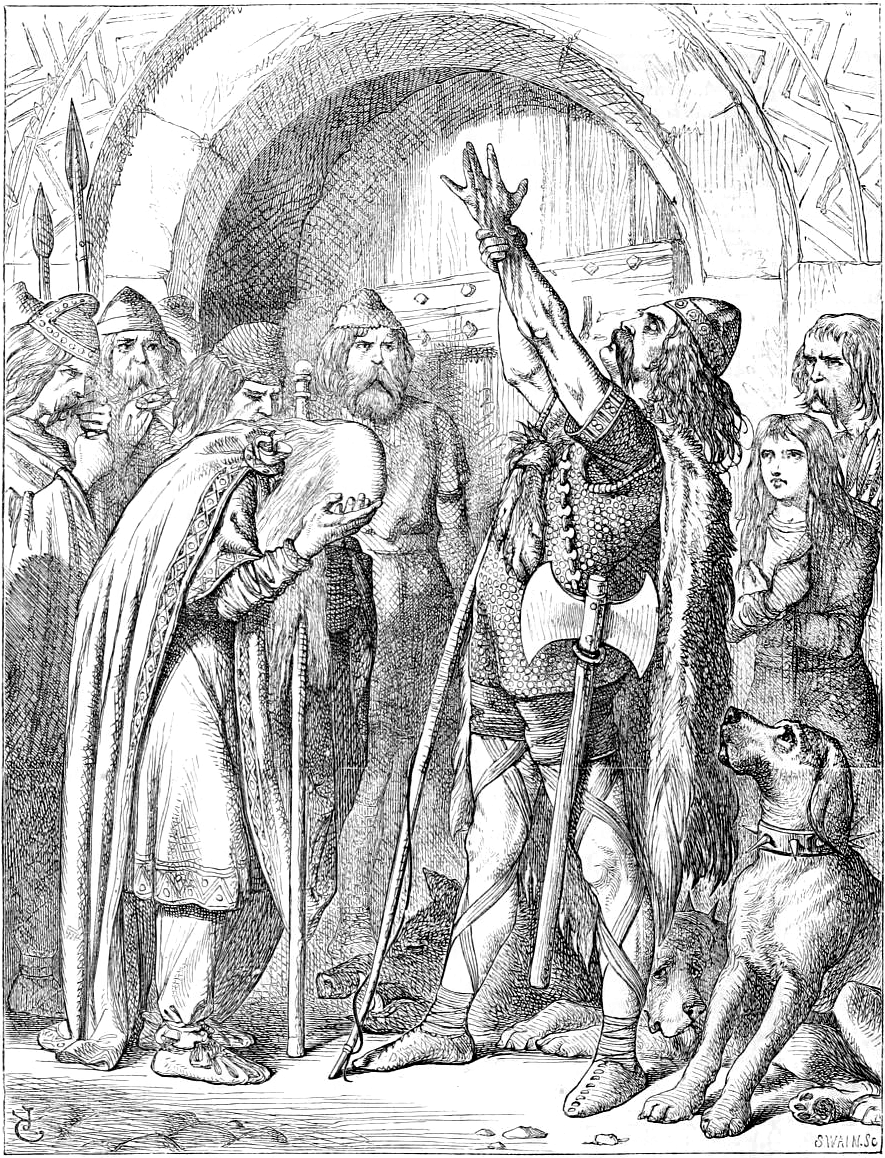
Ebrel made her name by joining in a celebration of the Barzaz Breizh (here, "Nominoe's Vow" by John Tenniel for an English translation)

Albums (solo)

- 1995 : Chants en breton, (Coop Breizh)
- 1996 : Tre ho ti ha ma hini, (Coop Breizh)
- 1996 : Dibenn (An Naër Production)
- 1998 : Voulouz loar... Velluto di luna (Coop Breizh)
- 2013 : 30 ans de chant
- 2021 : Lellig (Coop Breizh)

Albums (Annie Ebrel Quartet)

- 2008 : Roudennoù (Coop Breizh)

Albums (collaborations)

- Christian Duro Soner Fisel
- 1989 : Sources du Barzaz Breiz aujourd'hui
- 1993 : Voix de Bretagne (France 3, Le Quartz Brest)
- 1994 :
  - Quand les bretons passent à table
  - Just a Traveller with Youenn Gwernig
- 1995 : Kleg Live
- 1997 : Kan Ha Diskan with Yann-Fañch Kemener (Coop Breizh)
- 1998 : Voulouz Loar/Velluto di luna, gant Riccardo Del Fra (Coop Breizh)
- 2000 : Er roue Stevan (gant Roland Becker)
- 2003 : Ephemera (gant Jacques Pellen)
- 2004 : Un devezh ba kerch Morvan (gant Marcel Le Guilloux) (Coop Breizh)
- 2012 :
  - Tost ha pell with Lots Join (Coop Breizh)
  - Teir with Nolùen Le Buhé and Marthe Vassallo (Coop Breizh)
- 2018 : Paotred with Nolùen Le Buhé and Marthe Vassallo (Coop Breizh)

== See also ==
- Louise Ebrel
- The Goadec Sisters
- Coop Breizh
- Kan ha diskan
- Gwerz
- Music of Brittany
- Breton language
- Riccardo Del Fra
