= Dom Duff =

Dom DufF
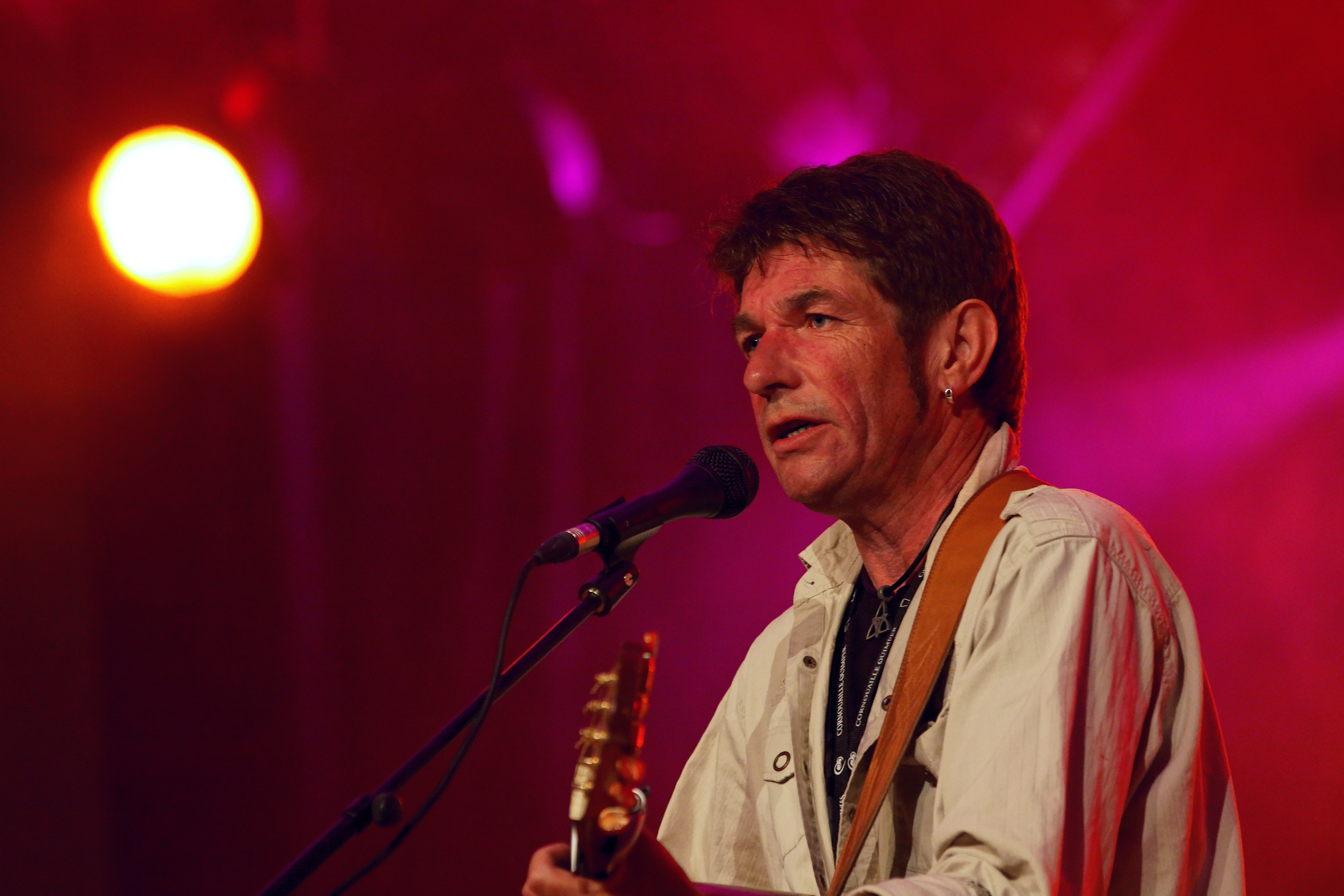
- At the Festival de Cornouaille, 22 July 2011.

Background information
- Birth name: Dominique Le Duff
- Born: 20 August 1960; Plouescat, Brittany, France
- Genres: breton singer-songwriter, breton folk-rock, celtic folk-rock
- Instrument(s): Acoustic and electric guitar, mandolin, bodhran
- Labels: BNC, Paganab, Boutou prod
- Website: www.domDuff.com

Dominique Le Duff (born 20 August 1960) is a Breton singer-songwriter.

== Early life ==
Le Duff was born in Plouescat in the Finistère department of Brittany in north-western France. Dom Duff was raised on his parents coastal farm and learned both French and breton language.

In 1974 he started learning guitar, then joined various local bands for fifteen years. After horticultural studies he worked as a teacher, in garden centers, and as technician for vegetable seeds companies.

== Music career ==
In 1995 he started to be a full-time musician and teamed up with friends to start the Breton music band Diwall. They toured a lot Europe and released two albums : "Dansal ha Nijal" (Dancing and Flying 1997) and "Setu ar Vuhez" (That's life 1999).

In 1999 he established himself as a solo act. His songwriting is mostly in Breton and 2003 was the release of his first album "Straed an Amann"(Butter street), nominated for 2003 best Breton album.

He is collaborating with artists such as Alan Stivell for the album Emerald, and joined him for the magical breton night Yaouank in Rennes on 11/19/2009. Dom collaborate also with Kila, Pascal Lamour, Bagad Roñsed Mor, Skilda.

In February 2010 Duff started a side project "Brythonics". He teamed up with Swansea songwriter Andy Jones. They wrote songs about Brythonics migrations and the show has been played three times in Brittany.

In 2012, Dom Duff has been asked to write the anthem of the famous breton relay "Redadeg" and Foeter Breizh (Breton Wanderer) was released for the event, been sung by runners all over the 1500 km all over Brittany.

Early 2013, he started a crowdfunding campaign to help him release his new project Babel Pow Wow, an album celebrating Global Diversity. The campaign worked well, about 300 listeners and pledgers helped him to reach the goal, through his crowdfunding page and also his website. Dom and collaborators started also their own label Paganab to help him release the album.

== Discography ==
Year	Title	Notes
2003	Straet an Amann	Studio album
2005	Lagan	feat.Julie Murphy
2008	E-Unan	Live solo
2010	Roc'h	Studio album
2012	Foeter breizh	Single
2013	Babel Pow Wow	Studio album
2016	Kercool	Studio album
2019	7vet Kelc'h	Studio album

== Awards ==
- Straed an Amann : "Coup de Cœur" Le Télégramme 2003 and "Bravo!!!" Trad Magazine (n°90, p. 97)
- On 29 January 2010 Duff won Breton Singer of the Year and Best Album awards at the Prizioù (France 3).
