= Frères Morvan =

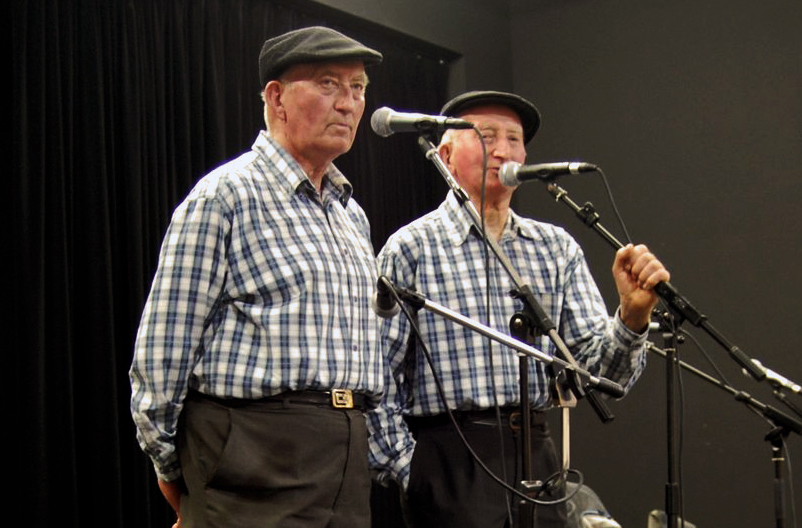
Frères Morvan in fest-noz in May 2010

The Frères Morvan (Breton: Ar Vreudeur Morvan) were a group of traditional Breton singers composed of brothers François (1923–2012), Henri (1931–2025) and Yvon (1934–2022), from Saint-Nicodème (Côtes-d'Armor) and who founded a group of traditional singers in 1958, with the arrival of the first sound system.

== Discography ==
- 1974 : Ar vreudeur Morvan
- 1999 : Les frères Morvan
- 2009 : Un demi-siècle de kan ha diskan

== Awards, nominations and honours ==
- Ordre des Arts et des Lettres
  - Officiers (2013)
