= Coop Breizh =

Breton cultural company

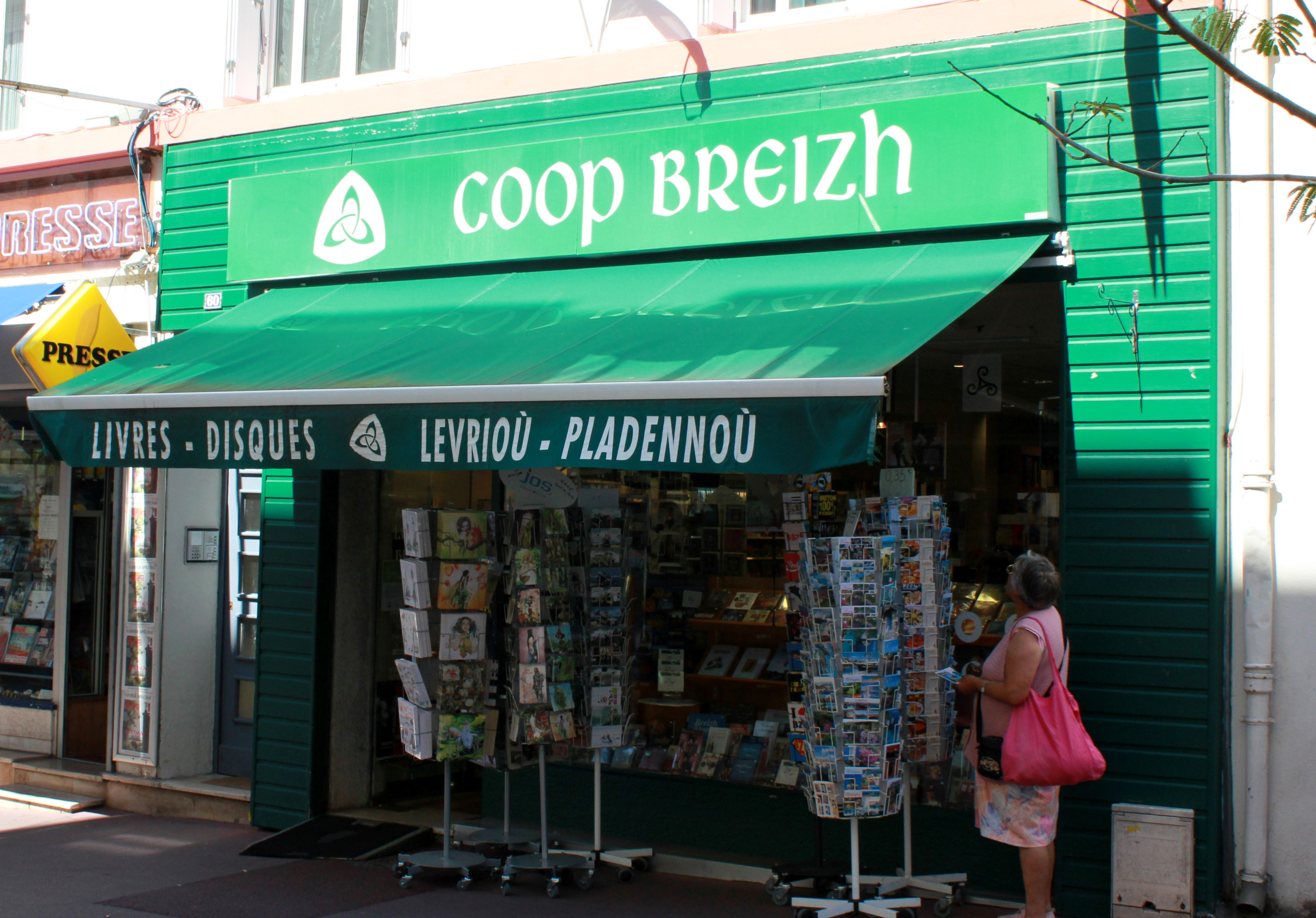
Coop Breizh shop in Lorient

Coop Breizh is a Breton cultural company founded in 1957 by Kendalc'h confederation, based in Spézet, Brittany, France. Specialized in the production, the publishing and the literary and musical distribution, it propose articles related to Breton culture, Celtic cultures and the sea. Coop Breizh is the main Breton producer and distributor for books and musical creation. There are two shops : in Lorient and in Quimper.

The company has produced singers and musicians such as Nolwenn Korbell, Frères Morvan, Soïg Siberil, Denez Prigent, Louise Ebrel, among others.
