= Gwerz Skolan =

Gwerz popular in Lower Brittany, France

Black thy horse, black thy cope,
Black thy head, black thyself,
Yes, black! art thou Yscolan?

I am Yscolan the scholar,
Slight is my clouded reason,
There is no drowning the woe of him who offends a sovereign.

For having burnt a church, and destroyed the cattle of a school,
And caused a book to be submerged,
My penance is a heavy affliction.

Creator of the creatures, of supports
The greatest, pardon me my iniquity!
He who betrayed Thee, deceived me.

A full year was given me
At Bangor on the pole of a weir;
Consider thou my suffering from sea-worms.

If I knew what I now know
As plain as the wind in the top branches of waving trees,
What I did I should never have done.

--"The First Song of Yscolan", from The Four Ancient Books of Wales, by W. F. Skene, 1868

"Gwerz Skolan" is a gwerz with a long tradition in Lower Brittany, especially Léon-Trégor and Cornouaille. Its story is found in Old Welsh texts also, and the oldest extant Welsh version is found in the 13th-century Black Book of Carmarthen. The poem is cited as evidence for the preservation in Brittany of cultural memories and traditions predating the entrance of Bretons into Brittany. The gwerz was performed in Brittany until the 19th century, with some late examples from the 20th century. Its content (though many versions differ in their details) describes a man who had died after living a life of rape and murder, and now comes back from hell to ask for forgiveness.

== Content ==
The main character, Iannic Skolan (also Skolvan, Yscolan (in Welsh), and other spellings; "Skolan" meaning "the phantom"), is guilty of a variety of crimes (depending on the version)—in many versions, he raped his three sisters and killed the offspring, and set fire to a church and killed the priest. He returns from hell to ask his mother for forgiveness, supported by his godfather. Ethnomusicologist and linguist Donatien Laurent, who compared about a dozen published versions and added to that a dozen he found himself, distinguishes two different traditions in Brittany, one a "northern" tradition, associated with Léon and Trégor, the other more central, associated with Cornouaille. His study examined seven versions from the "northern" tradition that are between 42 and 80 lines long, and two incomplete ones; the "central" tradition has nine versions, between 65 and 110 lines, and two incomplete ones.

=== The "northern" tradition ===
Recorded versions from the first tradition start with a brief exposition, which explains that Yannig Skolan and his godfather have come to ask for forgiveness. The setting is the house of Skolan's mother; she is getting ready for bed when the two appear, dressed in black and riding black horses, and ask her to light a candle and rekindle the fire. She faints three times, and Skolan tells her he is her son. He explains he came from purgatory and will burn in hell if she does not pardon him for his crimes, which are then enumerated: he killed his father in his sleep; he raped his three sisters and murdered their newborn babies; he burned the baking room and killed cattle and destroyed wheat, reducing his mother to poverty; he looted a church and killed the priest during mass. She refuses to pardon him, and adds his final crime: he lost her "little book", which she enjoyed looking at so much. Skolan explains that it's safe, in the sea, guarded by a little fish. Only three pages are damaged: one due to fire, one due to blood, and one due to his own tears. At this point the godfather speaks, for the first time, and implores the mother to pardon the son—and she does, and Skolan goes off to heaven. Laurent notes that in contrast to other gwerzioù, there is unity of space, and a consistently elevated tone: the crimes could not be worse, and the possible outcome, damnation, could not be more serious.

=== The "central" tradition ===
The central tradition, consisting mostly of versions gathered by Laurent, is most fully represented by a version from Plounévez-Quintin, which has all the elements found in the various versions from this tradition in one text. These texts start differently, invoking "Skolvan, bishop of Léon", who has come to live in the style of a hermit near the forest of Caniscant, suggesting penitence for a grave error. The mother sees a fire out in the distance and understands that someone is doing penance, and says "my blessing and that of God / for whoever lit the fire there / except if it's my son Skolan". When she goes to bed she hears him outside, and when he confirms he is indeed her son, she curses him, and he leaves. He then meets his godfather, who agrees to intercede for him. She, however, responds by listing his crimes, ending every item with "that's not your greatest sin". There are slight differences with the other tradition; for instance, he also burned seven churches. She concludes the list with his greatest sin: he lost her little book, written in the Saviour's blood. The book, however, is in the sea, in the mouth of a little fish, with damage only to three leaves caused by water, blood, and tears. She forgives him. The text ends by saying that when the cock crows at midnight, the angels in heaven sing; when the cock crows at daybreak, the angels sing before God and "Saint Skolvan" sings with them.

=== Curse and purgatory ===
A version that Laurent says he learned of recently, from a woman from Trébrivan, has a lengthy description of the curse. She invokes on him the curse of the stars and the moon, of the rose fallen on the ground, of the stars and the sun, of the twelve apostles, of his brothers and his sisters, and of all their innocent ones. This curse is unique to the Cornouaille tradition, and the Trébrivan version also has Skolvan's description of purgatory: "My poor mother, forgive me, / I have done a long penance: / I have passed long nights in the fields between the horses' feet / under the rain and the falling snow / and under the ice when it froze". Laurent sees a resemblance with descriptions of a cold hell in Breton and Irish literature.

=== The "little book" ===
The mother's "little book" that Skolan lost is more important in the central than in the northern tradition, where in one version (that recorded by François-Marie Luzel) its loss is not the greatest sin; rather, it's the loss of the rosary that the mother kept inside the book. In the central tradition, as well as in the older Welsh tradition, the book is written with the blood of Christ. Literary scholar Linda Gowans wondered whether this might be the book mentioned in "King Arthur and King Cornwall", an English ballad (preserved in the 17th-c Percy Folio) in which an unarmed Sir Bredbeddle defeats a seven-headed sprite using spells from a book he found "by the side of the sea" (in lines 184-89).

== Historical background, recorded versions ==
The main character is connected to Merddin, or Myrddin Wyllt, the source for the character Merlin; Breton scholar Herve Le Bihan considers these characters all "avatars" of Merlin. In the early 19th century Merddin was considered the author of an "Ode to Yscolan". In the late 20th century, this connection was again picked up by modern scholars, beginning with the 1971 study by Donatien Laurent, whose interest was drawn by a comment made at a 1969 conference, and published "La gwerz de Skolan et la légende de Merlin" in 1971. Laurent's investigations convinced him the story told in the gwerz has a Welsh origin, or at least that the Breton and the Welsh texts have a common parent.

A version of the Welsh poem is found in the Welsh 13th-century collection Black Book of Carmarthen. This version is called "Dv dy uarch du dy capan", "The First Song of Yscolan", as item 26 of the manuscript.

=== Versions recorded in Brittany ===
The Breton gwerz was sung for centuries in Lower-Brittany, in many versions, by the "little people" of Brittany, who were frequently illiterate and did not speak French. It is cited by ethnomusicologist Yves Defrance as one of the songs that suggest an unbroken oral tradition dating back to before the settlement of Armorica by Celtic Britons in the 6th century.

From the early 19th century, many examples of the gwerz were recorded by Breton scholars of folk literature. Jean-Marie de Penguern, a lawyer from Lannion, recorded a version in Trégor, even before a text was published by Théodore Claude Henri, vicomte Hersart de la Villemarqué in the first edition of his Barzaz Breiz (1839); de Penguern found another in Léon in 1851. De la Villemarqué, in 1839, thought the song retold the murder in the previous century of a young girl by a certain Yannig Skolan. By 1845, when he published the second edition of Barzaz Breiz, he had become familiar with the older Welsh poem, and added some couplets he said he found. He claimed this newer version showed the text's provenance in the Gaulish tradition.

In 1856, Breton writer Gabriel Milin recorded one from a worker at the Brest Arsenal. Folklorist and poet François-Marie Luzel recorded a version, again in Trégor, from a beggar from Pluzunet. Two years later Luzel heard another version, also in Trégor, from the mother of Marc'harid Fulup, the famous beggar and singer of Breton songs. Emile Ernault, linguist and writer, recorded two versions in 1889, in the same region, in Trévérec and Plougouver. Breton writer Maurice Duhamel had two versions sung for him during a tour in 1910, at Port-Blanc and Ploëzal. Folklorist Yves Le Diberder recorded it in 1910 in Pont-Scorff, and in 1938 a version by a retiree from Pleuven was published. Finally, Donatien Laurent found a dozen versions from different sources all over Lower Brittany, between 1959 and 1968.

=== Recorded performances ===
A version sung by Marie-Josèphe Bertrand, recorded by Claudine Mazéas in the 1950s, was released on CD in 2008; Mazéas noted she usually started her performances with that gwerz, which she considered a kind of hymn, and which set a respectful and theatrical tone for the performance. The Celtic folk music group Skolvan includes a sample of Bertrand's recitation from 1959 on their 1994 CD Swing & Tears. Yann-Fañch Kemener recorded a version by Jean-Louis ar Rolland in 1979, released on CD in 1996.

=== Related poems ===
Donatien Laurent considered it "probable that at least two of these gwerziou we can hear today in Breton living tradition are Breton medieval lays that never fell into decay", the two being the Gwerz an Aotrou Nann and the Gwerz Skolan.
