= Gwerz an Aotrou Nann =

The Gwerz an Aotrou Nann (French:Gwerz du Seigneur Nann et la Fée English:The Ballad of Lord Nann) is a gwerz in the Barzaz Breiz, previously entitled La Korik and Le Seigneur Nann et la Korrigan.

Donatien Laurent considered it "probable that at least two of these gwerziou we can hear today in Breton living tradition are Breton medieval lays that never fell into decay", the two being the Gwerz an Aotrou Nann and the Gwerz Skolan.

== In popular culture ==
La Villemarqué published a version under a French title Le Seigneur Nann et la Fée in 1839.

It is a version of a traditional Scandinavian ballad Sir Olav and the Elves. Francis James Child connected it through that, noting that it was closest to the oldest Danish version of Oluf, to Clerk Colvill.

A French version of the ballad is Le roi Renaud. Child also documented various other titles: Ann Aotro ar C'hont, Le Seigneur Comte, Ann Aotro Nann, and Le Seigneur Nann as recorded by François-Marie Luzel; the aforementioned and Aotro Nann hag ar Gorrigan recorded by La Villemarqué; Monsieur Nann in a collection entitled Poéses populaires de la France; Sonen Gertrud guet hi Vam and Chant de Gertrude et de sa Mére recorded by Louis-Antoine Dufilhol (under the pseudonym Louis Kérardven).

== Plot summary ==
In the forest, a newly wed young nobleman encounters a korrigan by a fountain brushing her blonde hair. She tries to seduce him; but he, a married man, refuses.

Vexed by this, she then offers him a choice: die in three days or lie sick in bed for seven (in some versions, three) years. Thinking that his wife is young enough to re-marry if his death is quick, the man chooses the former option, goes home, tells his mother to make his deathbed from which he will never arise, informs his mother of the reason and begs her not to tell his wife.

Unbeknownst of what has befallen, the wife starts asking questions. She asks after her husband, wondering why he has not returned from the forest, where he had gone to hunt some game for her. She asks the male servants why they are weeping, and when they lie and say that the household's best horse had died (in various ways in various different versions, ranging from being drowned whilst being bathed to being eaten by wolves) she tells them not to weep, as another horse can always be bought. She asks the female servants why they are weeping, and when they lie and say that linen had been lost when washing it (or, in one version, the best silver bedcover had been stolen), she tells them not to weep, as the lost linen can be replaced. She asks the priests why they are chanting, and they tell her that a poor person had died during the night (or, in some versions, she asks why the church bells are tolling, and is told that a young prince had died).

Finally the truth comes out: She asks what colour to wear to church, red or blue, and (varying by version) she is either given black to wear or told that black is the new fashion. Arriving at church she sees the newly turned earth of her husband's grave (and, in one version, that her pew was hung with black) and her mother-in-law, unable to keep the secret any longer, finally informs her.

She dies upon the spot. In two versions she variously utters her final words to her mother-in-law: "Take my keys, take care of my son; I will stay with his father." or "Your son is dead; your daughter is dead."
