= Breton Ballads =

Academic monograph by Mary-Ann Constantine

- Author: Mary-Ann Constantine
- Subject: Breton literature
- Publisher: Cambrian Medieval Celtic Studies
- Publication date: 1996
- Awards: Katherine Briggs Prize, 1996
- ISBN: 0952747804

Breton Ballads is an academic monograph by Mary-Ann Constantine, published in 1996. The book includes examples of the Breton ballad known as the gwerz, and follows their history, and that of scholarship on the genre, into the 19th and 20th centuries. It was awarded the Katharine Briggs Prize by The Folklore Society in 1996.

== Publication ==
The book was published by Cambrian Medieval Celtic Studies, a publisher based in Aberystwyth, which also publishes a semi-annual journal and a range of occasional books. The monograph was released just after the 1995 International Ballad Conference in Brittany, in honor of the centenary of the death of Théodore Claude Henri, vicomte Hersart de la Villemarqué.

== Content ==
Breton Ballads is a monograph with extensive apparatus. In the first two chapters, Constantine provides an overview of the study of the gwerz and its importance to Romantic nationalism and the Celtic Revival of the 19th century. The third and fourth chapter are case studies of two important ballads, and the last chapter investigates the relationship between source material and republication via cultural and textual translation. A lengthy appendix contains texts of Breton ballads with English translations of the Breton. The source material, much of which is not available in the United States, is augmented by Constantine's own research.

The introduction provides insight into the ongoing controversy over the status of Breton folk songs, and introduces the main concern of the book: the always-shifting understanding, interpretations, and meanings of the ballads. In Chapter 1 Constantine gives an overview of the work of the three most important 19th-c collectors of oral Breton poetry: Théodore Claude Henri, vicomte Hersart de la Villemarqué (1815-1895), François-Marie Luzel (1821-1895), and Jean-Marie de Penguern (1807-1856).

Constantine explains the importance of the work of Villemarqué, whose 1839 collection of Breton poetry, Barzaz Breiz, set the tone for the study of this poetry. His supposedly chronological organization of texts created a timeline of Breton history, and promoted the idea that the ballads were uncorrupted remnants of a pure and simple Celtic past—after he had removed any Gallicisms. Constantine discusses the subsequent controversy over the collection, which started in the late 1860s with accusations of falsifications, and came to the fore in 1872 when Luzel publicly took Villemarqué to task over the editorial liberties he took with his source material. Villemarqué died in 1895, having revised and expanded his collection a number of times without ever disclosing his source material. (The ultimate denunciation of his work came from Breton writer Francis Gourvil (1889-1984), who argued that the entire Barzaz Breiz oeuvre was a forgery, though the discovery of his notebooks led Donatien Laurent (1935-2020) to partially defended Villemarqué.) In the rest of the chapter Constantine provides a social and geographical setting for the ballads, and discusses the influence of the Catholic Church and the position (and the extraordinary memory) of the singers of the ballads, who were typically "female, rural, poor, often illiterate".

The following chapter explains the ballads themselves in the context of performance and history; only recently, Constantine explains, have the gwerz come to be studied as individual literary artifacts rather than as historical elements in the unbroken tradition posited by Villemarqué. In the typical 19th-c view of the ballad tradition, the songs were lumped together as if they came from an undifferentiated mass of commoners, a community voice whose assumed simplicity and honesty predetermined the interpretation of the poetry. Villemarqué's view on the background of the poetry remained current: the ballads express a Celtic desire for "infinity", and since they were expressions of popular belief there could be no individual creativity. Villemarqué did not recognize the contradiction between this idea of oral poetry as an unfiltered popular expression and his practice of editorially restoring the supposed purity of the poetry. To explain the need for editorial emendation he must, like Sir Walter Scott, assume that language has degraded and the modern scholar needs to restore it to an original status.

The next chapters are close readings and case studies of two gwerz, the textual groups Iannik Kokard and Mari Kelenn, from the collection of texts collected by François-Marie Luzel. Iannik Kokard is the story of a man who falls in love with a girl who suffers from leprosy; the latest (of around sixteen) versions was recorded in 1980. Constantine discusses two textual groups, and two individual textual outliers, provides translations, and then gives a detailed discussion of themes and topography. The gwerz Mari Kelenn, by contrast, exists in only two 19th-c versions; it is the story of a young woman who is abused by her father and bears him seven children, all of whom she kills. For penance, she is locked in a chest for one year (in the one version) or for seven years (in the other); in both cases, after the penance is done a piece of her heart is left in the chest, but Mari is gone.

The final chapter discusses the romanticism of the 19th century and its influence on readings and interpretations, and the role of collectors. It is followed by a 40-page-long set of appendices, giving the text (with comments and glosses) and translation of nine Breton ballads.

== Reviews ==
Linda Gowans, in a review for the Jahrbuch für Volksliedforschung, called the book "a pioneering guide". Antone Minard, in a review published by the Journal of Folklore Research, said "it is an excellent introduction to the fields of textual ballad study and Breton folklore"; he also praises the translations and the appendix as a "good source for Breton-language students". Minard notes that although the primary texts were sung, Constantine does not deal with the music at all (it is not recorded in the manuscripts), but in general has high praise for the book: "Constantine has taken a corpus of interesting but sparse material and filled it out beautifully using modern folkloristic studies, history, and comparative studies. She has valuable insights into the relation between contemporary aesthetics and the collection, publication, and analysis of folklore. Her final observation is well taken: Modern folkloristics is guided as much by the 'late modern twentieth-century aesthetics of brokenness and flux' as nineteenth-century folklorists were guided by theirs". (Constantine continued a "postmodern" reading of fragmentary ballads and songs in a later book, co-written with Gerald Porter, Fragments and Meaning in Traditional Song.)

Where Minard praised the discussion of modern views of the texts, Isabelle Peere, reviewing the book for the journal of the English Folk Dance and Song Society, thought less of this shift toward literary history and away from literary analysis, an investigation "which is more concerned with collectors than with singers and audiences, and with the ballads' transcription rather than their meanings". She was "disappointed with her textual analyses and merely literal interpretations of these poetic representations of lived experiences." Still, she said, "Breton Ballads has all the merits of an introduction to the tradition; its carefully assembled contextual as well as textual data still offers the potential for further interpretation."

A negative critique was published by Yann-Ber Piriou in Annales de Bretagne et des pays de l'Ouest; Piriou criticizes Constantine for relying too much on the work of Leon Fleuriot and Donatien Laurent, and leaving out the work and observations of a number of scholars including Roger Sherman Loomis. He also criticizes her text selection and faults her for not including religious and other texts that predate the 19th century.

The book won the 1996 Katharine Briggs Award, given out annually by The Folklore Society. In its report, the jury said:

[Constantine's] book is both an observant history and an engaged social study. She is most enlightening on the relationship between collection, editing and publishing as well as on contemporary renderings of traditional themes in the Breton ballads. Breton Ballads is CMCS's first book: we think it marks the start of a promising list.
