= Mari Kelenn =

Breton folk song

"Mari Kelenn" (also "Mari Gelan"; French: "Marie Quelenn" or "Gelen") is a Breton gwerz extant in only two 19th-century versions. The song tells the story of a young woman who is abused by her father and bears him seven children, all of whom she kills. For penance, she is locked in a chest for one year (in the one version) or for seven years (in the other); in both cases, after the penance is done a piece of her heart is left in the chest, but Mari is gone. The coming of a white dove signifies she is absolved.

The two extant versions are very similar; textual variations and different emphases may be the result of the different singers having made different choices. The character of Mari Kelenn is linked by scholars to the story of Mary Magdalene, and its origin may lie in the legend of Mary Magdalen that had become widespread in the late Middle Ages, and during the Counter-Reformation became emblematic as a story of sin and penance performed by a woman.

== Texts ==
Two versions of the song were recorded in the 19th century. Folklorist and poet François-Marie Luzel (1821–1895) recorded a version of the song, which he published (with facing-page translation) in volume 1 of his Gwerziou Breiz-Izel (1868). It was sung by Mari-Anna Ann Noan (Marie-Anne Lenoan), an old beggar woman from Duault. This is what Mary-Ann Constantine, the modern editor of the texts, refers to as Version A. The second, Version B, was recorded by Breton scholar and poet Gabriel Milin (1822–1895) and published in 1961, in the journal Gwerin; the manuscript is inaccessible, in private hands. The title is spelled "Mari Gelan", with "Gelen" written underneath; the singer's name is Perrine Poder. Luzel knew of its existence, since he makes reference to the version collected by Milin in his own text, noting a textual variation. Both published versions show evidence of textual emendation by Luzel and Milin, and the text published in Gwerin gives a number of variant readings, which indicate that Milin rewrote sections of the poem, turning what look like gallicisms into words that look more Breton. Both versions are published in Breton and in English translation by Mary-Ann Constantine in her 1996 study Breton Ballads.

== Content ==
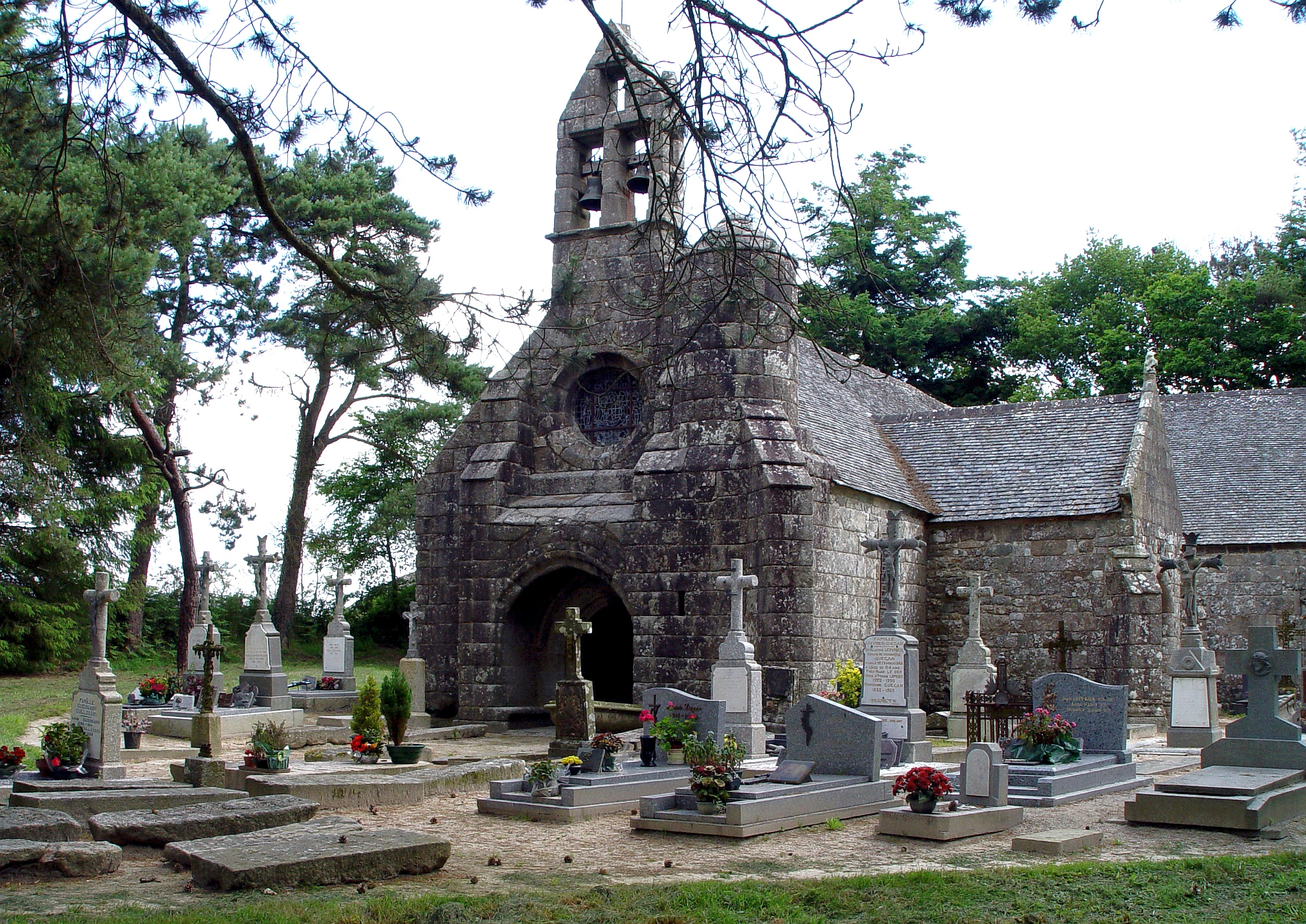
16th-c chapel at Burtulet

Both versions of the poem tell the same story. A young woman named Mari, whose mother has died, is raped by her father for seven years and bears him seven children. She buries all of them (after presumably having killed them), unbaptized, in different places, and then, on her father's instigation, goes to confess. She goes to the chapel at the hamlet Burtulet (in the Côtes-d'Armor department of Brittany), where seven different priests refuse to absolve her. Afterward, she meets a young priest on the road, who listens to her full confession and says absolution will come only if she does penance by locking herself in a chest. Here, the two versions diverge: in Luzel's text, she is in the chest for one year; according to Milin's text there are seven little piglets in the chest which cry out to her, "O mother wicked and mother cruel, to kill us without baptism. Unnatural mother and mother cruel, you killed your seven children". When the priest returns to open the chest (after one year, or seven years), there is nothing inside but a piece of her heart (the size of a hazelnut, in Luzel) and, in Milin, a black dog. Milin's version adds that the blood of the mother baptized the children. In Luzel's version, the piece of heart is placed on the cemetery wall and a white dove and a raven fight over it; the dove wins, and the souls of Mari and a monsieur Lafleur (who may be either her father or the young priest) are saved. In Milin's version, the piece of heart is placed on the church altar at Burtulet, and a white dove descends. Mari appears and tells the young priest her soul and those of her children are saved.

=== Thematic differences between the two versions ===
Version A gives more prominence to the father, who urges Mari to confess and whose sins are taken up by the daughter (she prays for him before she confesses); her act of penance absolves him also. In Version B, there is more focus on the souls of the children, which appear as piglets in the chest and are explicitly saved by Mari's blood. Constantine says version A is more sympathetic to Mari's situation, where B paints a "retributional picture of the penitential process", with its dramatic confrontation between children and mother and its more didactic tone.

== Themes ==
Ballads that deal with incest are generally rare, and compared to Anglophone ballads (like "The Maid and the Palmer", in a variety of versions), the text of "Mari Kelenn" focuses more on the power of penance, rather than on infanticide (or incest).

Anne O'Connor, following the work of Mary-Ann Constantine, also links the figure of Mari Kelenn to Mary Magdalene, who exemplifies the sinner-saint theme (versions of the Life of Mary Magdalen spread widely all over Europe, particularly after the publication of Jacobus de Voragine's Golden Legend), and connects this strand with themes from Irish ballads. The parallels are striking, and, according to O'Connor, connecting Breton and Irish material is important to an understanding of the widespread nature of such texts: O'Connor argues that the spread of "beliefs, legends and ballads about concerning child murder and the damnation of the child murderess" is due to the focus on sin and repentance during the Counter-Reformation. The gwerz's contents prove that the Breton world, more than that of the French, were part of the "Northern European sphere of influence", in the words of critic Antone Minard.
