= Georges Cadoudal (musician) =

French sonneur (1929–2021)

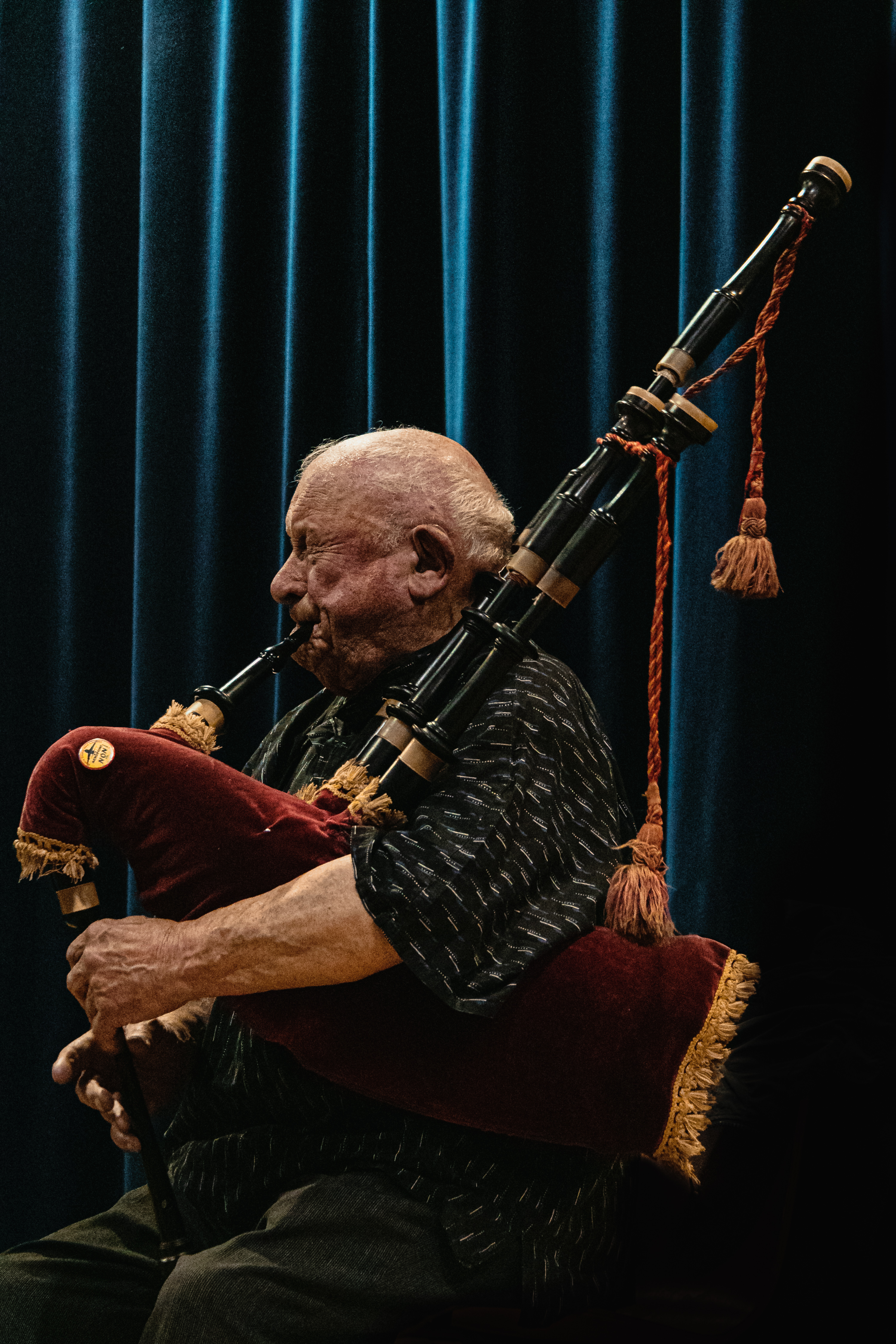
- Cadoudal in 2019
- Born: 6 July 1929; Magoar, France
- Died: 13 June 2021 (aged 91); Carhaix-Plouguer, France
- Occupation: Musician

Georges Cadoudal (6 July 1929 – 13 June 2021) was a French sonneur and musician. Alongside Étienne Rivoallan, he formed a group of sonneurs dedicated to the revival of Breton music after World War II. A founding member of Bagad Bourbriac, he was its penn-soner from 1953 to 1964.

== Biography ==
Cadoudal was born into a family of musicians in Magoar. He played the bombard alongside his father, who was a talabarder during the turmoil of World War II.

In 1946, Cadoudal founded Kevrenn Rostrenn, one of the first bagads. It was composed of two binioù bras, a few bombards, and a clarinet. In 1948, the bagad took part in the Bodadeg ar Sonerion in Sarzeau. Following this event, Cadoudal was able to broaden his repertoire and improve his bombard technique. The following year, he participated in the creation of a Celtic circle in Bourbriac.

In the early 1950s, Cadoudal met Rivoallan and the two began a period of close collaboration. Cadoudal taught Rivoallan how to play the bombard and they participated in a Fest Noz, leading to the creation of the Bagad Bourbriac in 1953. In 1958, 1959, and 1960, the two won the Bagadoù National Championship. During collection sessions, the two met Marie-Josèphe Bertrand and the Frères Morvan in 1958. Following Rivoallan's accidental death in 1961, Cadoudal won that year's Bagadoù National Championship alongside Daniel Philippe.

In 1966, Cadoudal created the dañs fisel competition in Rostrenen. In 1994, he created the group Re an Are. He settled down and became a sheep breeder in Brennilis, but continued to follow the Breton musical scene closely. He also advocated for peasant agriculture and fought against environmental struggles, founding the Association Bevañ e Menez Are. Locally, he fought to preserve the Hôpital de Carhaix and appeared in the 2012 film Bowling.

Alan Stivell claimed "to have been marked by the influence of Etienne Rivoallan and Georges Cadoudal". In August 2018, Stivell awarded Cadoudal the collar of the Order of the Ermine.

Georges Cadoudal died in Carhaix-Plouguer on 13 June 2021 at the age of 91.

== Discography ==
=== With Étienne Rivoallan ===
- En passant par la Bretagne n°4 (1954)
- Sonneurs de Basse-Bretagne (1959)
- Airs pour noce bretonne (1959)

=== Participations ===
- Fest-noz Cadoudal (1975)
- Souvenir de Bretagne Ya Breizh : Danses, Binious et Bombardes (1976)
- En Bretagne: Noce bretonne et fest-noz
- Chants et danses de Bretagne: l'Argoat

=== Singles ===
- Dérobée du pays de Guingamp - polka piked - dans tro plin - dans fisel (1957)
- À travers le pays breton (1959)
- Heloise et Abellard - Gwerz an anon - suite de dans plin
- Suite Dans plinn
