= Titi Robin =

French musician

Thierry "Titi" Robin (born 26 August 1957 in Rochefort-sur-Loire) is a French composer and improviser. His style combines elements from the Mediterranean world including Romani, oriental and European cultures. He plays guitar, buzuq, mandolin, and ’oud.

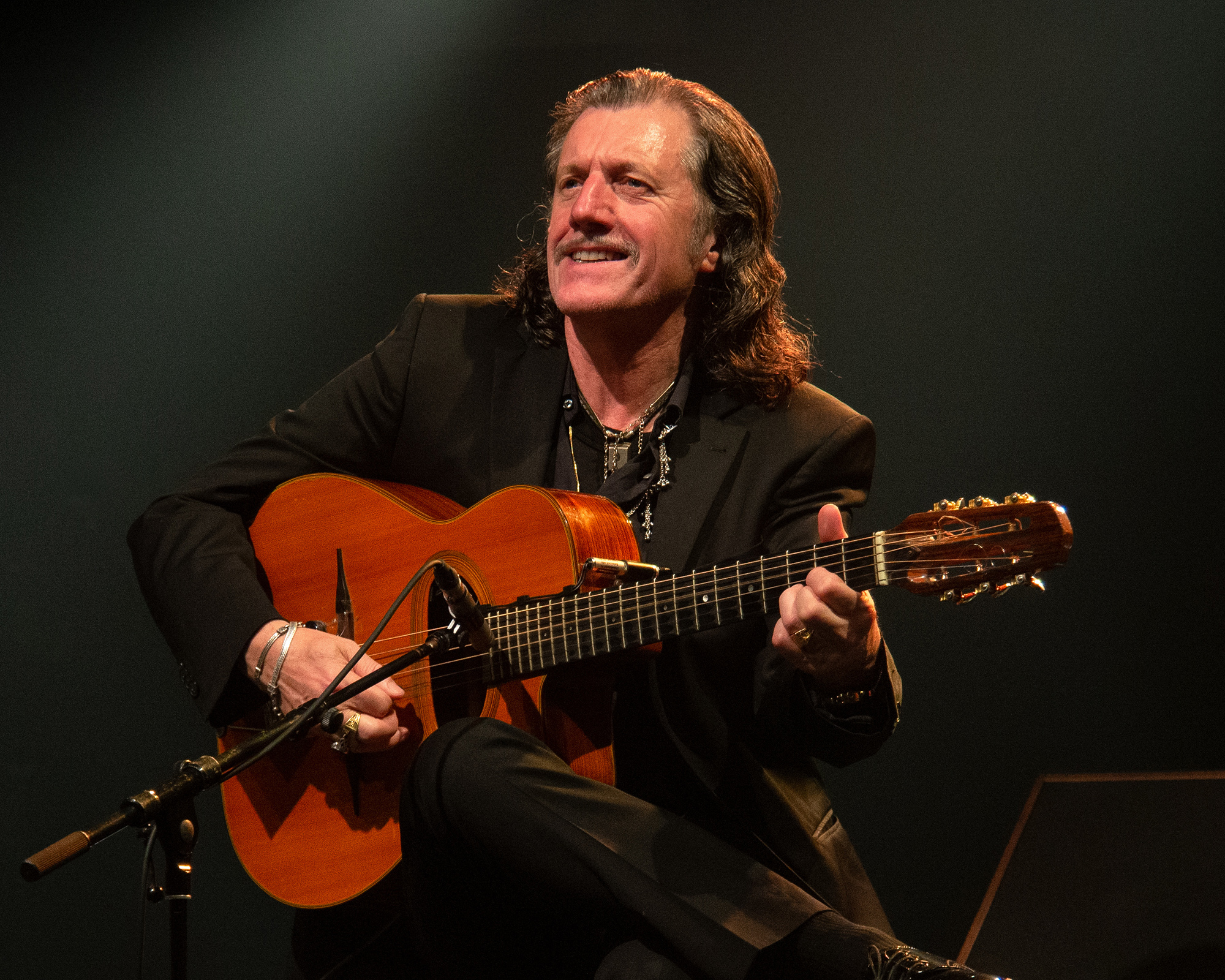
Concert in Normandy in May 2022

== Biography ==
=== Artistic beginnings ===
Titi Robin, early in his career, performed at Arab and Romani community festivals that gave him the opportunity to test his musical approach. The musicians accompanying him are almost exclusively from minority groups (such as Berber Moroccan Abdelkrim Sami).

=== Beginnings ===
In 1984 he appeared (guitar, ‘oud and buzuq) in duet with Hameed Khan, an Indian tabla player originally from Jaipur. In 1987, he founded the "Johnny Michto" band, which combined Moroccan Berber rhythm with the electric buzuq, bass, clarinets and bagpipes. Although influenced by flamenco, mainly in its voice and poetic form, he has never directly performed it, preferring to exchange ideas with the artists of this musical form.

=== Les Trois Frères ===
Titi Robin while still with Hameed Khan, a duet which highlights melodic and rhythmic improvisational duels, meets Brittany singer, Érik Marchand, who incarnates in his opinion the rich traditional popular culture of Titi Robin's own home region. Together they develop a repertoire enlisting quarter-tones modes, Eastern modal improvisation based on taqsîm, and Gwerz, the ancient monophonic lamentation which the singer along with Yann fanch Kemener is at the time one of the heirs. Ocora Radio France commissioned a recording – "An Henchou Treuz" (1990) – which won the Grand Prix de l'Académie Charles Cros, a fitting beginning of the collaboration of the two duos that will eventually form the "Trio Érik Marchand", most of the repertoire composed and arranged by Titi Robin. This out of the ordinary formation – a Brittany singer, an Arabic lute player and an Indian tablâ specialist (for the record, it is their photography that illustrates the first article on "world music" in the Encyclopedia Universalis) – will travel internationally: from the Womad festivals to stages specialized in contemporary music, passing by the Théâtre de la Ville in Paris, Quartz in Brest, not to mention the jazz venues who acclaim their innovative approach to improvisation. Their international tours take them from Quebec City to Houston, from Marrakesh to Birzeit. The first album under the name of "Trio Érik Marchand" appeared in 1991: An Tri Breur (three brothers) (Silex). In the early 2000, the Trio Érik Marchand performed periodically, with Keyvan Chemirani at the percussions.

=== Gitans ===
This formation revealed Titi Robin mainly as an oudist (even if the particular instrument designed by his brother Patrick Robin and his personal playing style is intentionally quite different from classical Arabic oud). A disc released in January 1993 greatly clarified the world of the musician of the buzuq and guitar: The artist dedicates "Gitans" in homage to the Romani community from whom he learned so much. It is a mosaic of encounters between Titi Robin's favourite artists, who represent different branches of the family, from North India to Andalusia, and to the Balkans, from which he draws his personal musical vision. The repertoire mainly consists of original compositions and does not reproduce any typical gypsy style. He believes that the best tribute is to create something new and personal but which better demonstrates paradoxically the rich source honored here. Guest musicians include the following: Gulabi Sapera (vocals), Bruno el Gitano (vocals, palmas, guitar), Mambo Saadna (vocals, palmas, guitar), Paco el Lobo (vocals, palmas), François Castiello (accordion), Hameed Khan (tabla) Francis Alfred Moerman (guitar), Abdelkrim Sami (drums), Bernard Subert (clarinets, bagpipes). This release and the musical cooperation it required will attract a wide audience, bringing together both savvy aficionados and lovers of Mediterranean music. "Gitans" will tour in Japan, at the Hollywood Bowl (United States) and from South Africa up to the major European world music festivals. The theme "Petite mer", certainly the best known of the composer, comes from the disc.

=== Le Regard Nu ===
At the beginning of 1996, this group in a collective adventure, makes a radical thrust, coming out with an introspective instrumental recording, "Le Regard Nu" based on modal improvisation, as a result of a year of experimental research. Titi Robin was inspired by poses of female models, as in painting or sculpture, to nourish his musical improvisations on the solo ‘oud and buzuq. It is a series of musical tableaux. In the booklet, he cites Modigliani : “To work, I need a living being in front of me”. He is strongly inspired in his work by Jean-Pierre Montier's L’art sans l’art, which deals with the aesthetic vision of the photographer Henri Cartier-Bresson. The personality of the Iraqi oud player Munir Bashir, who according to Titi Robin "sculpts" silence and lets the present moment inhabit his improvisations, is very much present in the spirit of the musician's work. Starting from a specific traditional oriental technique, taqsîm, he approaches it more from a philosophical than a formal point of view resulting in an original iconoclastic style. In the same way American jazz has influenced improvisers from other cultures who than take there distance from the original model, Titi Robin has done the same with this aesthetic tradition.

=== Payo Michto & Kali Gadji ===
Tours of Gitans continue, as witnessed by the live album Payo Michto in 1997 (Francis Varis on the accordion). The voices are those of Saadna brothers from the "Rumberos Catalans" living in the district Saint Jacques (San Jaume) in Perpignan and Andalusian flamenco singer Paco el Lobo. The rhythmic style of Catalan rumba is important to Titi Robin, it crosses the sound of his Romani guitar compass with nylon-string guitars. This is one of the emblematic colors of his universe. Here, we also listen to Brittany bagpiper Bernard Subert. Abdelkrim Sami is at the percussions and Gulabi Sapera brings her Rajasthani Romani dance. In parallel, Titi Robin wants to find a way of forging links with contemporary Western popular music, which leads to a new formation, orchestrating the saxophone, drums and bass. It will be in Kali Gadji (1998) that the Romani and Oriental influences, always present, mingle with the French texts as well as with the polyrhythms of West Africa. From Morocco to Mali, passing by Mauritania, Titi Robin feels that history has linked these cultures to the great Mediterranean civilization. Musicians that are invited are Renaud Pion (saxophones), Abdelkrim Sami (vocals, percussions), Farid "Roberto" Saadna (vocals, guitar, palmas), Jorge "Negrito" Trasante (drums), Gabi Levasseur (accordion), Alain Genty (bass) and Bernard Subert (oboe, bagpipes). The orchestra has toured for many years in parallel with "Gitans" but did not have the same response from the public and critics.

=== Un Ciel de Cuivre ===
Ciel de Cuivre, released in 2000 is the album the artist considers the one that represents the diversity of his musical world the best. "I don’t know any other art school than the street and pleasure, because no one taught me how to speak this language but men and women crossed on my road and far from being all musicians. There is truth in the beauty of the deaf world, and I polished a mirror which may reflect this light: this gesture is the meaning of my music. As the saying Qawwal “thousands of times, I plunged myself into the river with no bottom but it is in a hole that I found the precious pearl.“ The real journey is inside. Music feeds itself in that inner source, deep in the heart, as the star, because there is no better elsewhere, or golden age in the past. Every day, under a sky of copper, we hit the road, a little more digging to find the bread, salt and the gold of the deep song." Titi Robin (excerpt of the text presenting the disc). Fifteen musicians are invited such as Farid "Roberto" Saadna, Gulabi Sapera, Keyvan Chemirani, François Laizeau, Renaud Pion, Negrito Trasante, Francis-Alfred Moerman. A sextet toured continuously offering themes from this disc mixed with older compositions. The Titi Robin Trio (‘oud, guitar, buzuq / accordion / percussion) drawing across exclusively Titi’s instrumental repertoire also produce a lot abroad, especially in the Middle East (Iraq, Jordan, Qatar, UAE, Saudi Arabia, Lebanon, Palestine...).

=== Titi Robin and Gulabi Sapera ===
Since 1992, Titi Robin regularly worked with Gulabi Sapera to whom he dedicated a book "Gulabi Sapera, danseuse Gitane du Rajasthan" (2000, Naive/Acte Sud). She tells her legendary life in Rajasthan, a nomad young lady who goes from the miserable life of snake charmers camps to national and then international recognition. She is frequently invited to Titi's shows and the song Pundela from the disc "Gitans" just like the song "La rose de Jaipur" from the album "Ciel de cuivre", shows how much emotion there is between the two artists when they meet. In 2002, they released an album co-signed Rakhî dedicated to the marriage of their respective universe, based on songs from the Kalbeliya’s caste or the Marwari repertoire from the Thar desert. "Her choreography and Titi Robin's compositions gather round a show Jivula which sees the day in September 2002, and is announced on many French and international scenes, enjoying a light show of Pascale Paillard. In 2006, the DVD Jivula and CD Anita! (Madoro Music / Naïve) are released, including several documentary films by Sergio Mondelo presenting Titi Robin's universe, from an Andalusian trip to the grave of singer Camaron de la Isla, featuring interviews and archival footage, music scenes extracts and family, the music and dance creation of Titi Robin and Gulabi Sapera, filmed in India and France. (The live record entitled Anita! regroups stage interpretations from the fall of 2005, recorded and mixed by Guillaume Dubois assisted by Jerome Musiani with a Louis Vincent's booklet). The collaboration with this dancer from Rajasthan ended in 2007. It lasted fifteen years.

=== Alezane et ses vagues ===
In 2002, the composer created the entire soundtrack of the Manuel Boursinhac’s film La Mentale (soundtrack Naïve). He then took up the challenge of responding to a commission (to accompany a film with music) exclusively using elements of his own musical style. In 2004, to celebrate his 20 years of career, the anthology Alezane was released as a double disc with a rich booklet designed by painter and graphic artist Eric Roux-Fontaine. Alezane is a selection of Titi's recordings presented as two thematic CDs: Le jour offers rhythmic dance tracks, La Nuit, more intimate songs, embellished with unpublished ones, including a couple of remixed versions and reinterpreted songs. In 2005, two sets of Parisian productions took place: four nights at the Bouffes du Nord in February, five nights at the Cabaret Sauvage in November, on the occasion of the release of the new album: Ces vagues que l’amour soulève (Naïve, October 2005). While the recording sessions of previous records were often the opportunity to invite many musicians with whom Titi Robin did not necessarily tour on stage, but were ideally suited to the interpretation of one or more songs. He invited this time a more limited group of musicians, who were largely similar to those around him during the shows. Foremost is the faithful trio (Francis Varis on accordion, Kalou Stalin on bass and Ze Luis Nascimento on percussion) that accompanies him all year in Jivula (The musical and choreographic creation of Titi Robin and Gulabi Sapera), the quintet and trio, he wished omnipresent in this disc. Cantaor flamenco singer Jose Montealegre, who sings in the quintet came to enrich a suite written around the oud. The Saadna brothers (Los Rumberos Catalans), with whom he played for many years, joined him to end the disc in Romani festivities. During the composing of the soundtrack of Manuel Boursinhac's film, for the first time, there was a string orchestra, mainly consisting of composed of violas, cellos and basses (based on the arrangements of Renaud Gabriel Pion). Titi Robin has extended this present experience thanks to arrangements of Francis Varis on three themes. That same year, the formation "En famille" appeared, gathering around Gulabi Sapera and Titi Robin a new generation: Maria, Colombe “La Coque” and Dino Banjara. Maria, singing, and La Coque, at the percussions, also joined in the studio for the recording of this album. In 2005, Titi Robin composed (assisted by Silvio Soave who is his sound engineer since the early 1990s) the soundtrack of Florence Quentin’s film OLE!(Naïve). Amongst the abundant tours of the artist in France and abroad, he was invited by Alain Bashung during his carte blanche at the Cité de la Musique in June. The two musicians met on several occasions in 2006, showing a great relationship and mutual respect.

=== Encounters ===
At the invitation of Philippe Conrath for the Africolor festival, Titi Robin and the Reunion poet-singer Danyèl Waro, emblematic figure of the Maloya, conceived a program reuniting their two artistic universes. This concert called Michto Maloya was to be unique but responding to many request from organizers, took the road from the winter of 2006 to the summer of 2007 for three big tours: Transmusicales of Rennes, Sakifo festival in Reunion through "Jazz sous les pommiers" in Coutances, theater Bouffes du Nord in Paris...

In June, Titi Robin participated in the Gnawa Festival in Essaouira (Morocco), with Kalou Stalin and Ze Luis Nascimento. They performed in trio and also presented a concert with Maâlem Abdenbi el Gadari. For the musician, this was an emotional homecoming, since Moroccan music and Gnawa music in particular existed in his debuts.

In August 2006, the first stage collaboration between Titi Robin and Faiz Ali Faiz took place at the Escales de Saint-Nazaire festival. The partnership later developed into a new musical creation presented at the Festival de Saint-Denis in 2009, accompanied by the release of the album Jaadu and a series of international concerts. For this project, Robin composed an original melodic repertoire inspired by the Sufi poetry of qawwali. The mystical tradition of qawwali, combining poetry, rhythm and devotional singing, was a major influence on Robin and was especially popular in Rajasthan, India, where he frequently performed alongside Gulabi Sapera

In March 2007, the new CD from the "La Reine des Gitans" Esma Redzepova, the voice of the Roma in the Balkans, comes out with the participation of Titi Robin (Accords Croisés). A series of concerts to celebrate the release of the album takes place in Paris (New Morning) and Arles (Suds Festival).

In December 2007, for the 800th anniversary of the birth of the Sufi poet Rumi, Titi Robin presents an original creation at the Theatre Gerard Philippe in Saint Denis, focusing on poetry, however leaving a large part to the daf, an Iranian frame-drum, used among others, in the Sufi rituals. The Iranian Kurdish musician Shadi Fathi counselled the musician on the adaptations in French poetry and wrote the parts for the daf sections, accompanied by Colombe Robin "La Coque". The reciters are Esmail (Persian) and Soeuf Elbadawi (French), and other musicians are Renaud Pion (wind) and Keyvan Chemirani (zarb).

=== Kali Sultana ===
Trio and quintet concerts (with either Pepito Montealegre or Maria Robin singing) continue to tour.

Titi Robin toured in India from north to south in October 2008 with his trio (he frequently tours on the sub-continent) and writes on this occasion, a daily blog at the request of the website of Radio France Internationale(RFI). This entire article is still available.

Kali Sultana, l’ombre du ghazal ("the shadow of the ghazal") is released in the fall 2008, a new project both discographic and scenic. A long suite arranged in two parts, seven movements and three interludes, this river of an album is a double-CD.

« It has the power and flow of a lyric and epic poem. Melodic and rhythmical motifs follow on from one another, answer each other and expound on each other, united by the free inspiration of music which abolishes any distance between improvisation and the written tradition, individual expression and collective dynamics, the fervour of dance and meditative introspection, a commitment to the real world and the aspiration of dreams. As ever in Titi Robin’s music, these motifs weave the outline of a story, in which it is Kali Sultana (the “Black Queen”), who this time takes the pride of place. She is the feminine incarnation of grace, an ideal of beauty that every artist pursues; she is the universal, imaginary and yet ubiquitous muse, whose indescribable and elusive splendour every artist dreams of embracing. » (Excerpt from the presentation of the album).

A tour in 2009 follows that includes a string section (two violas and cello), and the Renaud Pion returning to the winds. This concert takes over two hours all parts being linked without a break.

During 2009, Gitans is released in an English version in the United Kingdom.

During the summer, at the initiative of Brahim El Mazned and Patrice Bulting, he met Moroccan gumbri player, Majid Bekkas with whom he put on an original show for the two festivals of Agadir and Saint-Nazaire. Participants included percussionist Minino Garay and ribab player Foulane Bouhssine (Mazagan).

For his first concert in Mali in Bamako in May 2011, Titi Robin was welcomed on stage by great musical figures such as Toumani Diabate, Oumou Sangare and Bassekou Kouyaté who all came to welcome him publicly and interpret a few songs with him for the occasion. Cheick Tidiane Seck is also present in the room. The Malian style of string playing seems close to the musician's own universe (it still captures the musical continuity from the Arab Andalusia to Mauritania and Mali) and he had already composed for the album Kali Gadji a tribute to singer Oumou Sangare. He also invited her on stage at La Cigale in Paris in 2000. In return, she organized an evening in honor of Titi Robin and his band in Bamako.

=== Sur Les Rives ===
From late 2009 to 2011, Titi Robin worked on his triptych Les Rives, a long-term project that is close to his heart: producing a recording in each of these three countries, India, Turkey and Morocco, around his repertoire with local musicians. This local CD production destined for a local public was a way to repay the cultures that had influenced him, something he considered his duty. As a second step, the three CDs are grouped together for a European and international distribution.

In parallel with these record productions, Titi Robin has not stopped touring in France and internationally. Nominated for the "Victoires de la Musique" in 2012 in the category "World Music", he seized the opportunity to publish a very critical stand on such a media event:

«...In my career, I have carefully avoided any competition. First and foremost, in the act of creation, there is no price, no trade, no competition. The aesthetic quest is the only motive...»

The release of the compilation Les Rives at a concert at the Arab World Institute in Paris in November 2011, brought together a new formation with Murad Ali Khan (sarangi), Sinan Çelik (kaval), El Mehdi Nassouli (guembri, vocals), Ze Luis Nascimento (drums) and Francis Varis (accordion). The orchestra has performed regularly on stage since 2012 and 2013.

In July 2011, he presented in Mumbai, Bangalore, Chennai and New Delhi a quartet composed around him, Murad Ali Khan (sarangi), Vinay Mishra (harmonium) and Ninayat Netke (tabla) for the release of his Indian record Laal Asmaan.

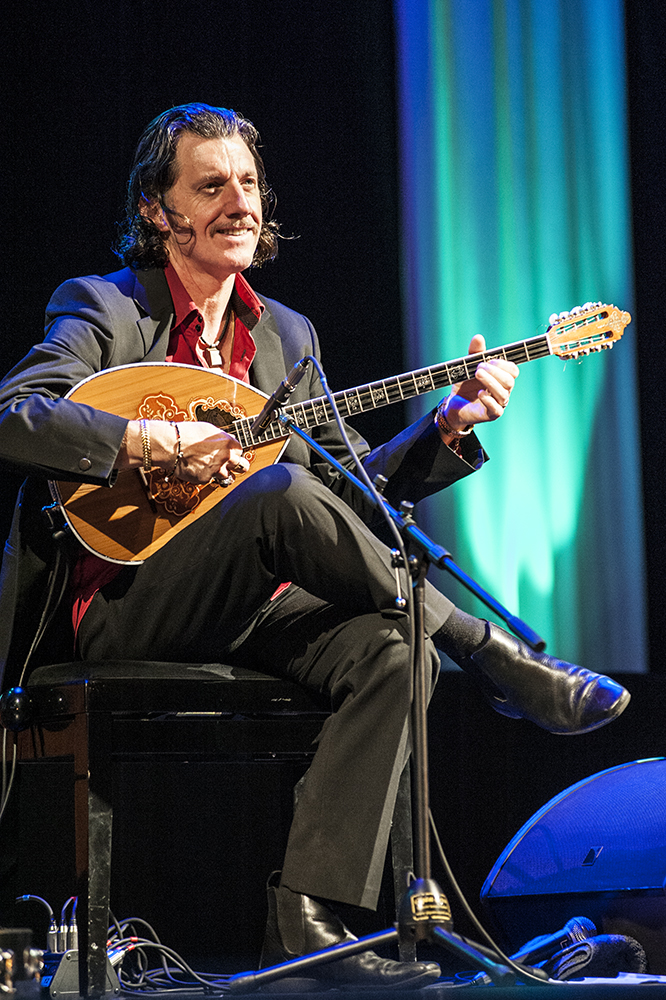
Project Les Rives - The leader

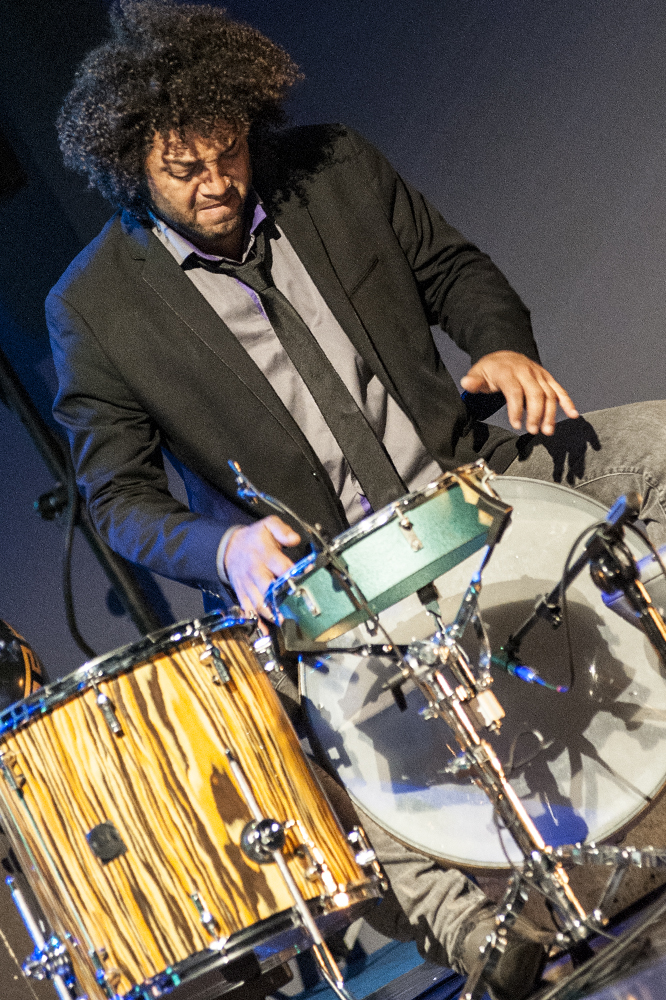
Project Les Rives - percussionist Ze-Luis Nascimiento

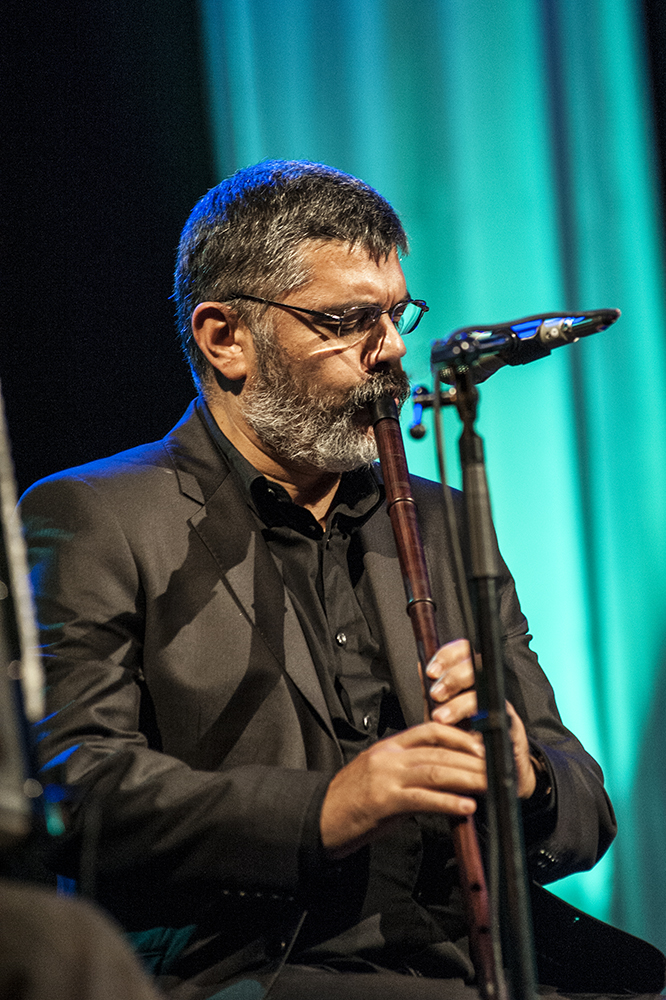
Project Les Rives - Sinan Çelik on kaval

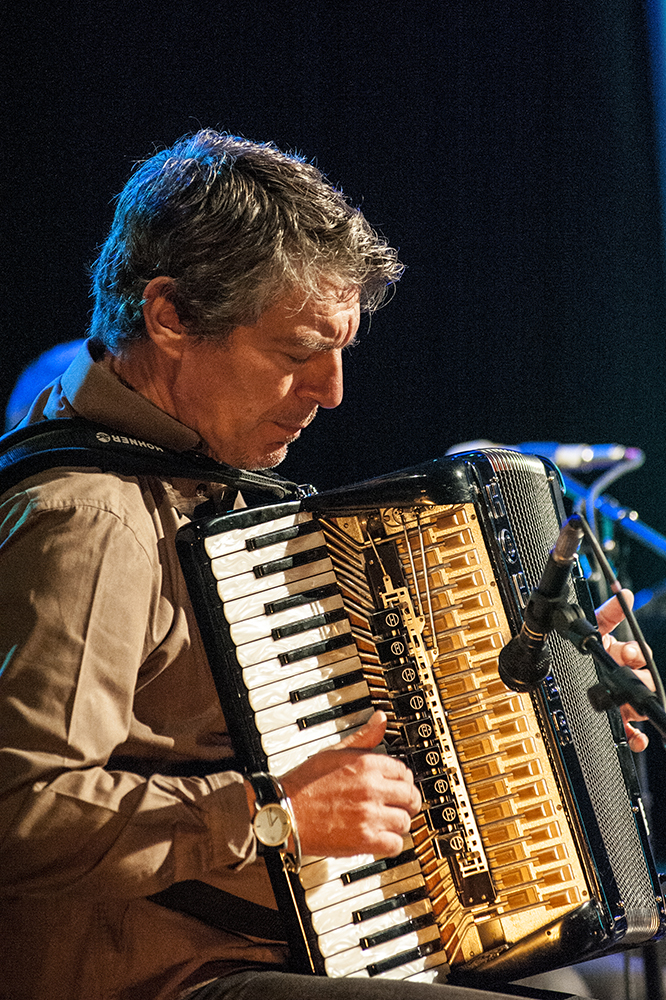
Project Les Rives - Francis Varis

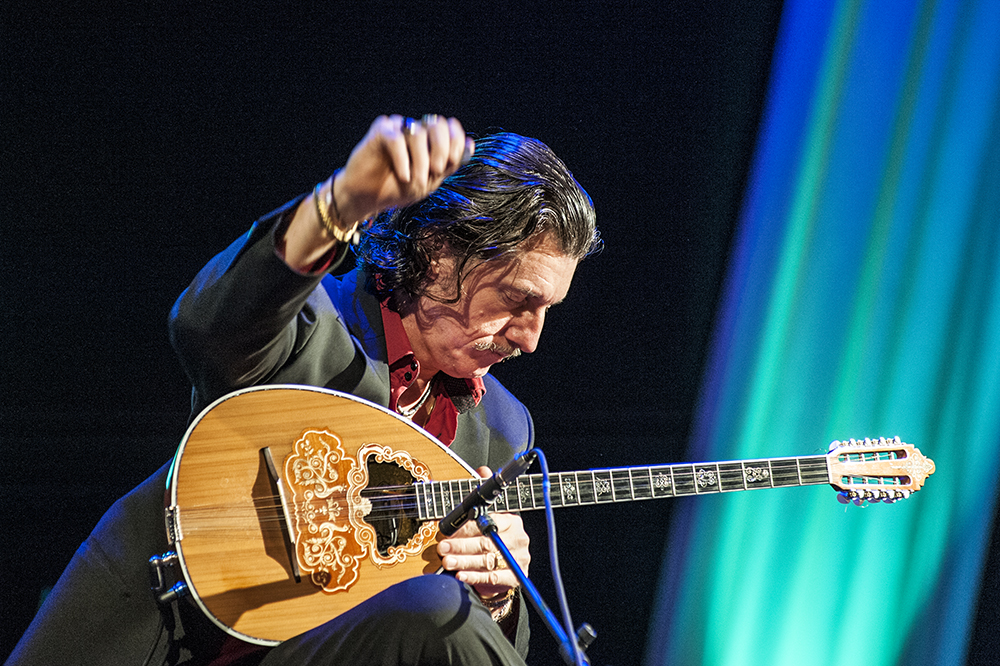
Project Les Rives - Titi Robin

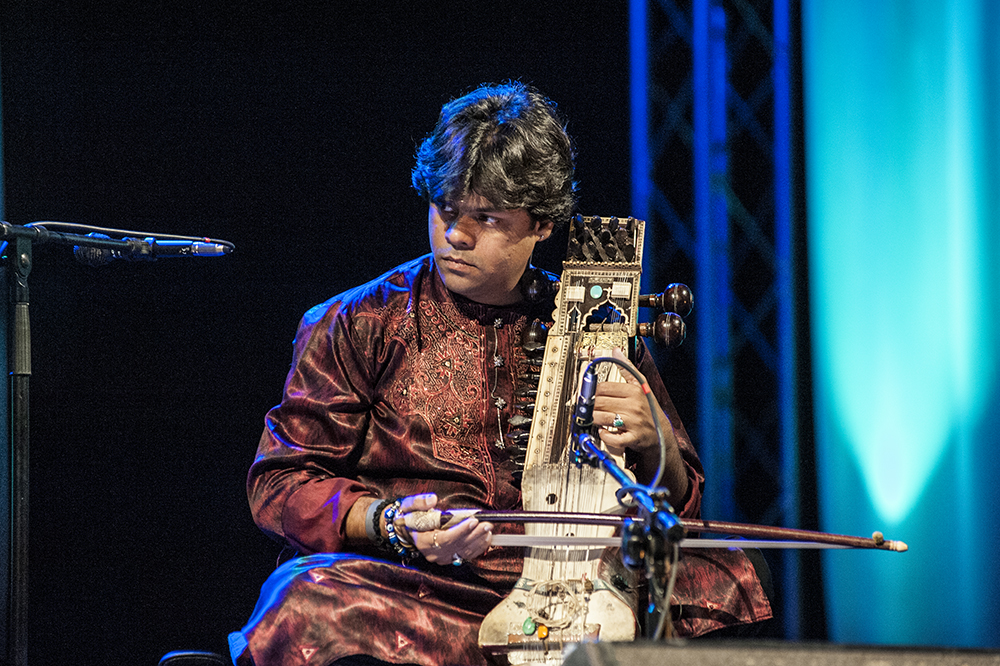
Project Les Rives - Murad Ali Khan - sarangi

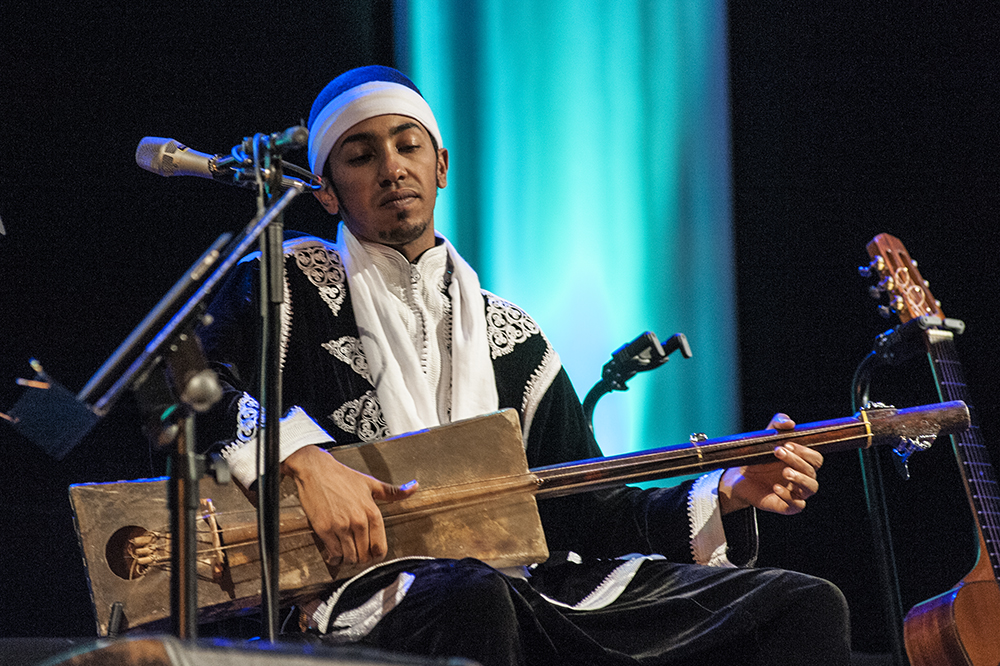
Project Les Rives - El Mehdi Nassouli - sintir

== Musical style ==
Robin builds his work through:

- compositions, which are spread over thirty years already (his style has not changed, so much so that he used for example, in 2008, among the compositions of Kali Sultana, two themes composed in the late 1970s, and it is difficult to detect any stylistic difference. "The truth is I do not know why this style has been given to me, but I work constantly to fit and polish it").
- interpretations and improvisations that evolve because, as in the compositions, his life and his heart are made of "experiences which are those of a man's life with all it includes: joys, suffering, broken dreams and sometimes fortunate discoveries." His mastery of instruments and orchestration is also enriched by experience.
- stage performances that take on, from different angles, always the same universe, making sure that these different lightings give a sense to his quest. The very different and complementary pleasures of solitude and solo playing, and society and festive improvisations form this orchestral approach.
- recordings, that he considers completely apart from concerts (live discs appear to be concessions to his friends), "like books or paintings, in which those that acquire them savor their way in ten years on either side of the earth, these recordings in the same way are appropriated as a book with the same degree of privacy. All these recordings will become part of an ensemble that, if God wishes, will take on a raison d’être".
- specific and fundamental steps as:
  - working with models, like a painter or a sculptor, (Le Regard Nu "The Naked Eye", the preparation work for La Mentale or Kali Sultana where he again invites models to revive his inspiration) or with dance as in a dialogue (with Gulabi Sapera).
  - To base his orchestrations with musical logic inherited from traditions (like polyrhythms of the Moroccan Chaabi in Lovari and Fandangos Moors themes) in order not to artificially graft a theme with a foreign orchestration that wouldn't "breathe" in the same way, very much done in "world music" (which is an approach, far from his personal philosophy).
  - The will that there is no perception in his work of junction points, the seams between the different influences, which can paradoxically make the music seem simple, but in this way proving to him the success of the endeavour (“It is what I also like in poetry: when the most profound idea is expressed with utmost simplicity, in all modesty, and this it is to my eyes the most difficult achievement because you can not cheat, you are naked.") It must be underlined that he attaches the greatest importance to giving credit to the traditions that inspire him.

== Discography ==
- Duo Luth et Tablâ (with Hameed Khan), Playasound, 1986
- An Henchou Treuz (with Érik Marchand), Ocora/Radio France, 1989
- An tri breur (Trio Érik Marchand), Silex, 1993
- Gitans, Silex/Naïve, 1993
- Le regard nu, Silex/Naïve, 1996
- Payo michto, Silex/Naïve, 1997
- Kali gadji, Silex/Naïve, 1998
- Un ciel de cuivre, Naïve, 2000
- Rakhi, Naïve, 2002
- Alezane, Naïve, 2004
- Ces vagues que l'amour soulève, Naïve, 2005
- Olé (Original soundtrack), Naïve, 2005
- La Mentale (Original soundtrack), Naïve, 2006
- Anita, Naïve, 2006
- Kali Sultana Naive, 2009
- Jaadu (with Faiz Ali Faiz), Accords Croisés, 2009
- Laal Asmaan, Blue Frog (Mumbai, Inde), 2011
- Gül Yapraklari, A.K. Müzik (Istanbul, Turquie), 2011
- Likaat, Ayouz Vision (Inezgan, Maroc), 2011
- Les Rives, three discs with a booklet and a DVD of the Indian filmmaker Renuka George, relating the recordings in the three countries, Naïve, 2011
- Taziri (with Mehdi Nassouli), 2015
- La musique des Gitans, Le Petit Cheval d’Étoiles, Book/CD, a story by Béatrice Fontanel illustrated by Charlotte Gastaut, narrated by Jean Diab and music composition by Titi Robin, Gallimard Jeunesse, 2008
- La P'tite Ourse, Disc/DVD, text by Laure Morali and animated movie by Fabienne Collet and music composed by Titi Robin, Naïve, 2008

=== Participation as a guest ===
- Sag An Tan El, Érik Marchand / Le Taraf De Caransebes, (on the tracks « Marv eo ma mestrez », « Madam la Frontière », « An danserien» et « Le libertin »), Silex, 1994
- Dor, Érik Marchand / Le Taraf De Caransebes, (on the tracks « Ton Moldav », « Gwellan Amzer », « Doina Haiducilor » and « Kannen ma mestrezed»), Sony Music / Rca Victor, 1998
- Identités, Idir, (on the track « Fable »), Sony/Saint Georges, 1999
- Djezaïr , Kadda Cherif Hadria, (on the tracks « Brit » and « Awiliya »), Naïve, 2001
- Somos Gitanos, Gipsy Kings, (on the track « Majiwi »), Columbia, 2001
- Mon Histoire, Esma, reine des Tsiganes, Esma Redzepova, (on the tracks « Mon histoire », « Aman Aman », and « Hommage à Esma »), Accords Croisés, 2007

== Filmography ==
- Famille Nombreuse, documentary shot between France (at Titi Robin's home, in the Roseraie quarter in Angers, the Romani neighborhood in Saint Jacques in Perpignan) and in India (Jaipur), directed by Hubert Budor, production: Vivement lundi!, 1999 (unreleased)
- Jivula, documentaries « Airs de voyage » and « la Danse du Serpent » (presenting Gulabi Sapera and her work with Titi Robin), live concerts, musical diaporama, photos of Louis Vincent and a live CD « Anita », film direction : Sergio Mondelo, DVD Naïve, 2006

== Bibliography ==
- Gulabi Sapera, Danseuse Gitane du Rajasthan, Naïve/Actes-Sud, 2000.
- Rajasthan, un voyage aux sources gitanes, by Éric Roux-Fontaine, Titi Robin and Sergio Mondelo, Éditions du Garde Temps, 2004.
