= Jean-Louis ar Rolland =

Jean-Louis ar Rolland (last name also Rolland or Le Rolland; 8 October 1904 - 9 July 1985) was a Breton writer, notable for having remembered, and then written down, the stories he had been told during his childhood and after, traditional oral tales in the poetic gwerz tradition. Two of his collections were published, in Breton; he is hailed as one of the last of the Breton singers of traditional poetry.

The impetus for publication came when Jef Philippe, a well-known collector of Breton literature, moved in nextdoor and became his friend. Rolland suffered from arthritis and could not use writing implements anymore, but had managed, over time, to type out 16 of the poems he remembered. Philippe was particularly interested in the matter of Merlin, and this led to the publication of War roudoù Merlin e Breizh ("Merlin's footsteps in Brittany"), a collection of tales involving Merlin (directly or indirectly), including Gwerz Skolan. Yann-Fañch Kemener recorded a version of Rolland's Gwerz Skolan in 1979; it was released on CD in 1996.

== Bibliography ==
- Margodig an dour eienenn (Brest, 1984) (with Mikael Madeg, and illustrations by Joël-Jim Sévellec) ISBN 2-86775-046-6
- War roudoù Merlin e Breizh (1986) (with Jef Philippe) ISBN 2-86863-012-X
- Kemener, Yann-Fañch (1996). Carnets de route de Yann-Fanch Kemener (in French). Morlaix: Skol Vreizh. (contains Rolland's Gwerz Skolan)
