= Marguerite Philippe =

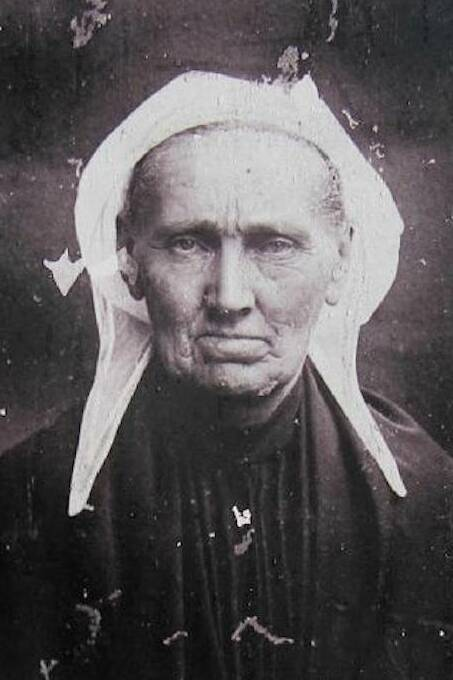
- Born: 12 August 1837; Pluzunet
- Died: 14 January 1909 (aged 71); Pluzunet

Marguerite Philippe (Breton Marc'harid Fulup 12 August 1837 Pluzunet - 14 January 1909), was a beggar, and a famous storyteller in the Breton language from the province of Trégor in Brittany.

== Life ==
Marguerite Philippe was born in 1837 in Pluzunet (northwestern France). She was the second-youngest of thirteen children. Her father was a tailor and her mother a spinner. Philippe was illiterate. However, she memorized about 150 songs ("gwerz") and a many tales and stories, which she had learned from her parents.

Philippe could not work with her hands due to a disability. She earned her living by attending pilgrimages to Léon and Cornouaille, and by making pilgrimages by proxy, notably to Sainte-Anne-d'Auray or the Tro Breizh, for those who paid her.

On 6 November 1875, she married René Salaün.

She regularly met with Perrine and François-Marie Luzel in Plouaret. They wrote down part of her repertoire. Many of the songs and tales she knew were collected by François-Marie Luzel, and published in his works.

Some authors took an interest in the process, how she collected by herself so many stories. Anatole Le Braz explained, she gathered stories from farmhands and maids at the farms where she spent the night, or by talking with pedestrians she met along the way.

== Legacy ==
Her tomb, in the cemetery of Pluzunet, was sculpted by Yves Hernot. In 1898, Ange M. Mosher, an American patron of Breton culture, commissioned a monument to her memory, in Pluzunet with Anatole Le Braz and other Breton regionalists.

Her statue, by Morley Troman, is located in the square of Pluzunet. Streets in both Quimper and in Lannion are named for her.

Henri Vincenot described Marguerite Philippe in his novel L'Œuvre de chair.

== See also ==
- Trégorrois Breton dialect
