= Gwerz Santes Enori =

Breton folk song

The Gwerz Santes Enori is a Breton gwerz, a type of folk song that combines literary with musical characteristics. The song, which is preserved in many versions and fragments, tells a story that resembles a saint's life, a 14th-century version of the hagiography of the Breton saint Budoc. Its general theme has been called that of "the girl with a golden breast", as told in stories throughout the Celtic world and surviving in oral form into the 20th century.

== Summary ==
The poem's story concerns the youngest of a king's three daughters (the king of Brest, or Brittany, or Spain, depending on the version), who sacrifices herself when her father is bitten by a snake. Only a virgin breast can save him, and Enori, the youngest, neglected daughter, offers herself up after her two sisters refuse. When she goes to help him a snake jumps onto one of her breasts, and her father cuts off the breast, after which he is miraculously cured (Mary-Ann Constantine identifies this as a "Celtic theme"); the daughter is rewarded by an angel who brings her a golden breast, and she gets a husband as well. Her mother-in-law, however, manages to convince her son that his wife is unfaithful; the punishment for adultery is death, and the king condemns the young woman to death, without knowing who she is, but then finds out that it is his daughter, now pregnant. Instead of putting her to death, he allows her to be put in a barrel and left at sea. After her husband regrets the matter, he searches for her and finds her and her child, in Ireland, now venerated by congregations of sailors; they are happily reunited.

== Theme and associated texts ==
The gwerz's theme is known as "the girl with a golden breast", and it was widespread across the Celtic world; a version of the story was still being sung in Scotland in the late 20th century, while a version with Gawain as the male protagonist was told in 19th-century Scotland. Constantine adds that the same story is found in a Welsh Triad, a Gaelic folk tale from Scotland, and a French medieval romance. A study of that theme was published in 1985 by Gwennole Le Menn (La femme au sein d'or, Skol-Dastum), which notes that it is related to the legend of Saint Gwen, the saint "of the three breasts". The theme is also found in a number of French lais, including the Lai du cor and the Lai du Mantel Mantaillé. It appears in the Livre de Caradoc, a biography of Caradoc which found its way into the 15th-century Perceval, the Story of the Grail.

In the hagiography of Saint Budoc, the female protagonist is called Azenor, who is identified with Saint Senara. Scholars confirm that the two stories must be closely related, to the point that neither one can be called the original version of the other.

== Editions and studies ==
- Le Menn, Gwennole. La Femme au sein d'or—des chants populaires bretons aux legendes celtiques. Dastum/Skol., "analyses extant versions of the gwerz of Sainte Enori whose themes are traced further in both Celtic and international mythology".
- The editors of Kan e Breizh list 17 different versions recorded in 39 "occurrences", including some with music, like the version published by Maurice Duhamel in Musiques bretonnes (1913, p. 20)
