= Magor =

Magor may refer to the following:

Places

- Magor, Monmouthshire, a village in Wales, United Kingdom
- Magor with Undy, a community in Wales, United Kingdom
- Magor Farm, a Romano-British villa near Illogan in Cornwall
- Breton name for Magoar
- Cornish name for Maker, Cornwall

People

- Liz Magor, a Canadian visual artist
- Ivan Martin Jirous, a Czech underground poet, known as Magor
- Magor, a legendary ancestor of the Hungarian people, see Hunor and Magor

Other

- HAT-P-2b, an exoplanet named Magor
