= Treujenn-gaol =

The treujenn-gaol (Breton: cabbage stalk) is the Breton term for the clarinet as used in Breton music. The term "treujenn gaol" was originally a pejorative term invented by bombard players who found the newer instrument encroaching on their livelihood.

== Origin and design ==
The clarinet arrived in Brittany in the 18th century. The most traditional Breton clarinet is an older type of instrument with 13 or even fewer keys, in contrast to the modern 'Boehm' instrument commonly used in contemporary music in France. Classical musicians in the 19th century discarded older instruments in favor of newer designs from makers such as Boehm, Albert, etc. replacing the formerly ubiquitous 13-key clarinet developed by Iwan Müller in the 19th century. These discarded instruments eventually found their way into the hands of folk musicians and the "treujenn gaol" was born.

After a decline in use in traditional music in the early 20th century, the instrument was revived in the 1970s for use in pairs of instruments (much like the bombard and biniou) and in the music of the bagad.

In Breton music, two clarinetists typically play together, or the clarinet plays with an accordion, though they also play in ensembles with other instruments. The clarinet is a common part of Breton jazz bands, along with saxophones and drums, playing both jazz and traditional songs.

== Play style ==
In the traditional pieces, only the clarion register is used (overblow flap open). The melodies generally use diatonic scales without changing the sign. Of the 13 keys, only those for the h (sounding a) and the c' (sounding b') as well as the overblow key are used. Other halftone keys or forked keys are not used. Accordingly, the unnecessary flaps can also be clamped or removed, in particular the movable rings are locked. Diatonic clarinets without or with few keys are also used. This results in two rows of notes:

From the fundamental note b: b, c', d', *es', f', g', a', b' (the notes marked with * are raised by a quarter tone compared to the equal temperament)

From the fundamental note c': c', d', *es', f', g', *as', *b', c"

These series largely correspond to the traditional tonality of central Brittany. These scales are more difficult to achieve on a 24-key clarinet.

== Players ==
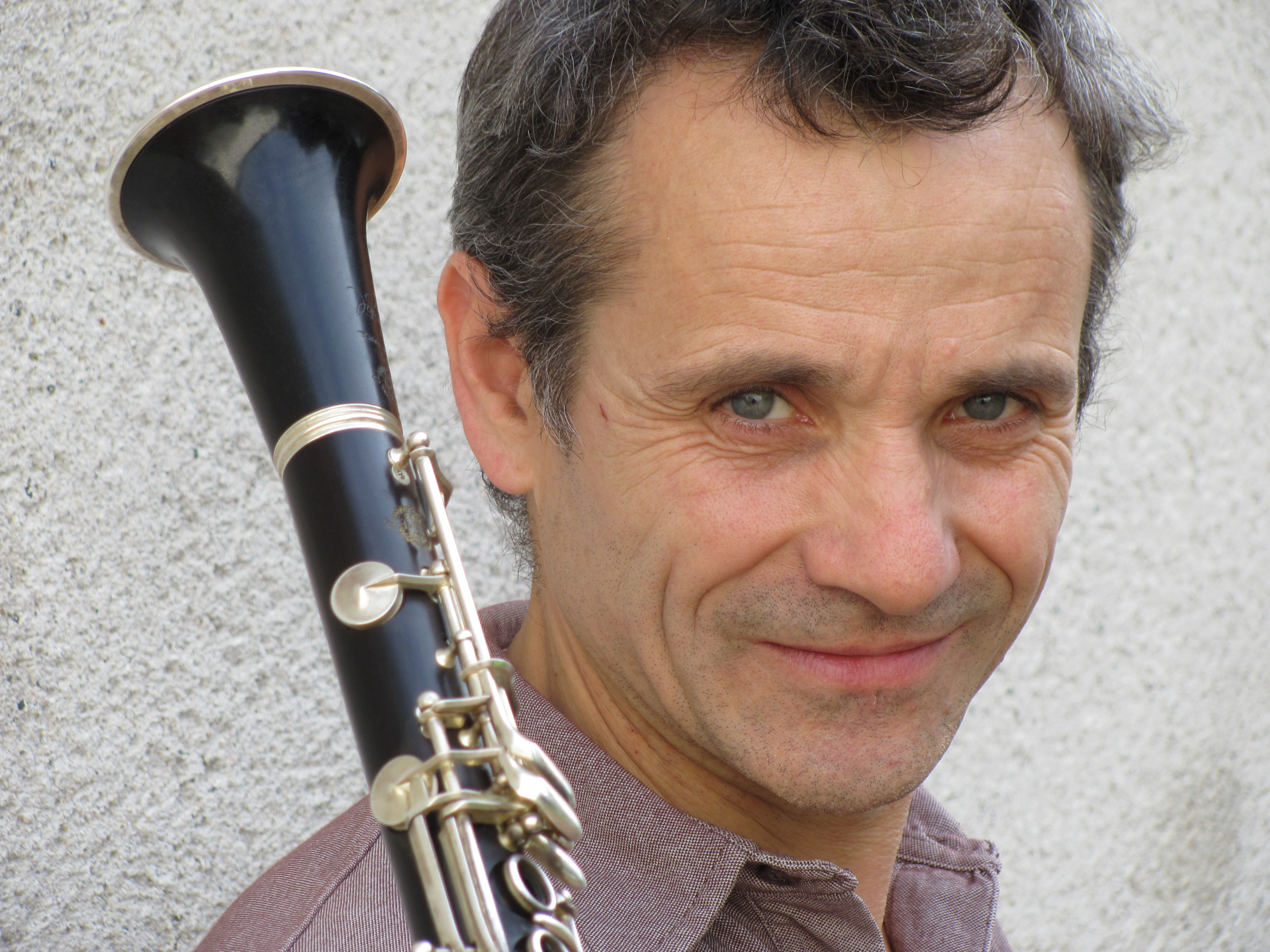
Michel Aumont

The best-known Breton clarinetists are probably Christian Duro and Érik Marchand, a former member of both Quintet Clarinettes and Gwerz. The bands Termajik, Kentan, Darhaou, Tonnerre de Brest, L'Echo, Cabestan and Strobinell also use clarinets.
