= Gwennole Le Menn =

French lexicographer (1938–2009)

Gwennole Le Menn (1938–2009) was a Breton writer, editor and lexicographer. He edited various Old and Middle Breton works. Le Menn edited the Catholicon, a trilingual Breton-French-Latin dictionary of 1499, and he compiled a bibliography of Breton literature printed before 1700.

== Bibliography ==
- La femme au sein d'or. Des chants populaires Bretons… aux légendes celtiques; Saint-Brieuc, Skol, 1985. (Breton folk songs and mythology)
- Grand choix de prénoms Bretons; Coop Breizh. (Breton given names)
- Les noms de famille les plus portés en Bretagne; Coop Breizh. (Breton surnames)
- Le vocabulaire Breton du Catholicon (1499), le premier dictionnaire Breton imprimé Breton-français-Latin de Jehan Lagadeuc; Saint-Brieuc, Skol, 2001
- "Le breton et son enseignement", Langue française, Armand Colin, no 25 « L'enseignement des "langues régionales" », 1975, p. 71-8
