= Saint-Servais, Côtes-d'Armor =

Saint-Servais Sant-Servez-Kallag
- Commune
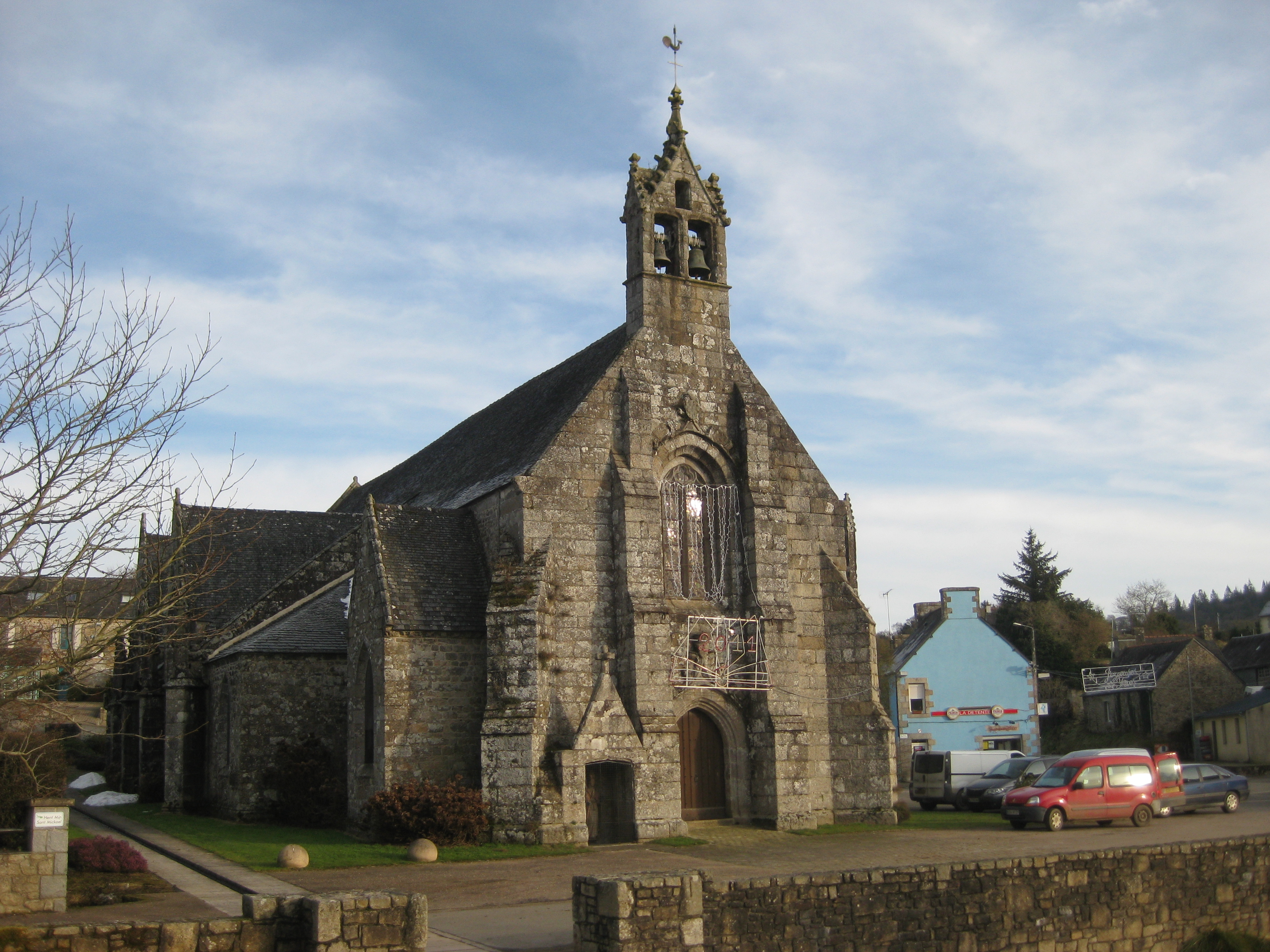
- The church of Saint-Servais
- Location of Saint-Servais
- Location within France Location within Brittany
- Coordinates: 48°23′16″N 3°23′12″W
- Country: France
- Region: Brittany
- Department: Côtes-d'Armor
- Arrondissement: Guingamp
- Canton: Callac
- Intercommunality: Guingamp-Paimpol Agglomération

Government
  - Mayor (2021–2026): Béatrice Billaux
- Area^{1}: 28.04 km^{2} (10.83 sq mi)
- Highest elevation: 292 m (958 ft)
- Lowest elevation: 130 m (430 ft)
- Population (2023): 435
  - Density: 15.5/km^{2} (40.2/sq mi)
- Time zone: UTC+01:00 (CET)
  - Summer (DST): UTC+02:00 (CEST)
- INSEE/Postal code: 22328 /22160
- ^{1} French Land Register data, which excludes lakes, ponds, glaciers > 1 km^{2} (0.386 sq mi or 247 acres) and river estuaries.

Saint-Servais (French pronunciation: [sɛ̃ sɛʁvɛ]; Breton: Sant-Servez-Kallag) is a commune in the Côtes-d'Armor department of Brittany in northwestern France.

== Burtulet ==
Since 1869, the hamlet of Burthulet or Burtulet is part of the Saint-Servais commune. Central in Burthulet is a 16th-c chapel, which once belonged to the Knights Hospitaller chapter of La Feuillée.

== Population ==
Historical population
Year	Pop.	±% p.a.
1968	657	—
1975	575	−1.89%
1982	481	−2.52%
1990	436	−1.22%
1999	390	−1.23%
2007	406	+0.50%
2012	415	+0.44%
2017	405	−0.49%
2023	435	+1.20%
Source: INSEE

== See also ==
- Communes of the Côtes-d'Armor department
