= Erik Marchand =

French musician (1955–2025)

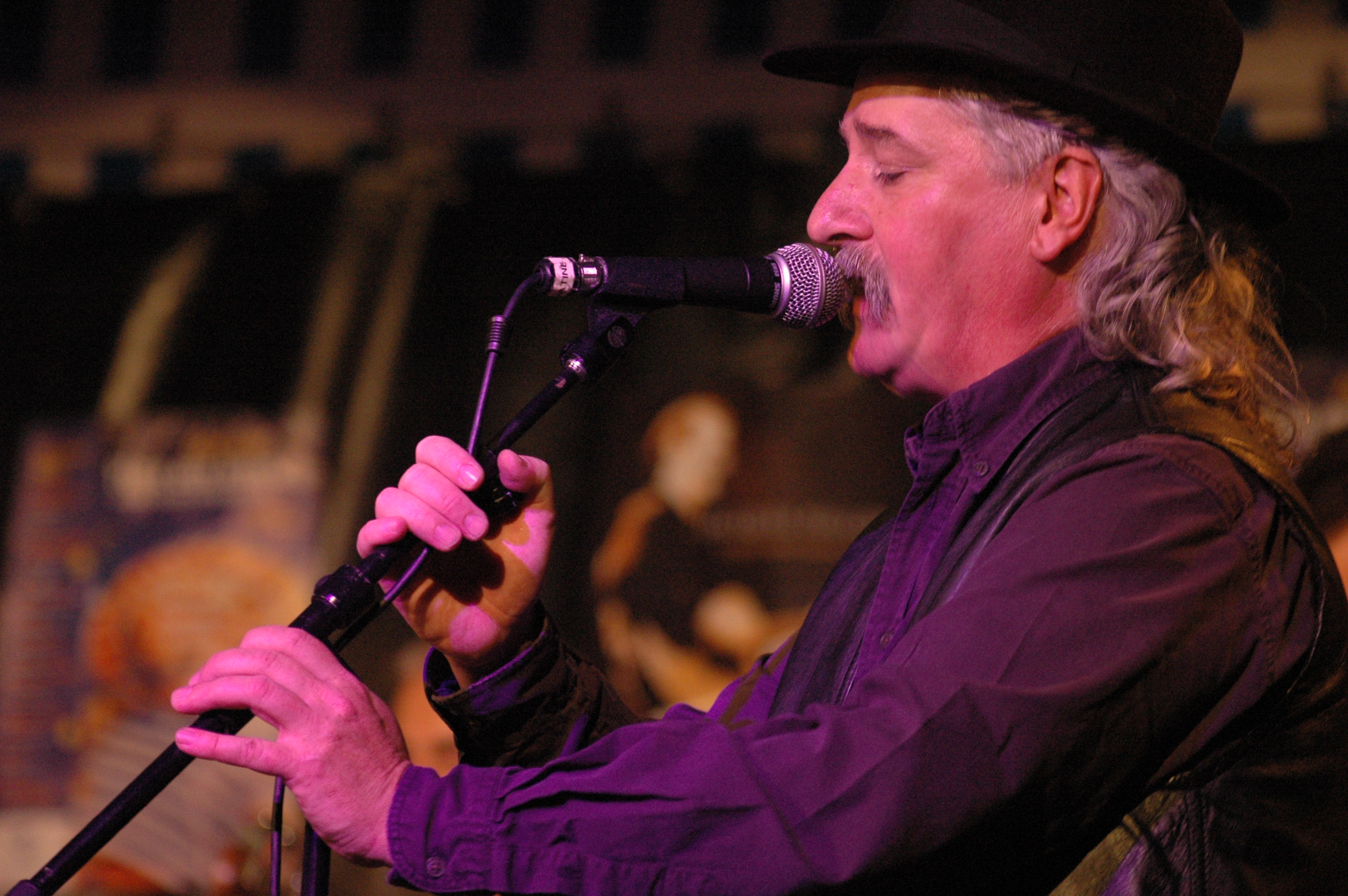
Marchand and the Celtic Procession of Jacques Pellen in 2007

Erik Marchand (2 October 1955 – 30 October 2025) was a French traditional singer and player of the treujenn-gaol (Breton clarinet). He was born in Paris while his family were of Breton origin, hailing from Quelneuc, Brittany.

Influenced by the music of Manuel Kerjean, Marchand moved to his family's homeland and studied traditional music and the Breton language. He became deeply involved with traditional Breton singing, including the gwerz, a traditional lament. In the 1980s he helped form a traditional music group called Gwerz which released three albums. In the 1980s he also began to collaborate with oudist Thierry Robin, producing a fusion of Celtic and Arabic motifs influenced by jazz.

Marchand died on 30 October 2025 at the age of 70.

== Discography ==
- 1982: Chants à danser de Haute-Bretagne, with Gilbert Bourdin ha Christian Dautel, Dastum
- 1985: Gwerz, nouvelle musique de Bretagne, Dastum/Gwerz
- 1985: Chants à répondre de Haute-Bretagne, with Gilbert Bourdin and Christian Dautel, Le Chasse-Marée
- 1988: Gwerz : Au-delà, Escalibur. Priz bras an Akademiezh Charles Cros 1988
- 1989: Gwerz Penmarc'h, with Cabestan, Le Chasse-Marée
- 1990: An henchoù treuz, chants du Centre-Bretagne, gant Thierry Robin, AMTA/Ocora, Priz bras an Akademiezh Charles Cros 1990
- 1991: Trio Erik Marchand : An tri Breur, Silex, ffff Télérama
- 1991: Musique têtue gant le Quintet de Clarinettes, Silex, ffff Télérama
- 1993: Gwerz live, Gwerz Pladenn
- 1993: Bazh du with le Quintet de Clarinettes, Silex. Diapason d'Or
- 1993: Erik Marchand et le Taraf de Caransebes : Sag an tan ell, Silex. Priz bras an Akademiezh Charles Cros 1995 ha ffff Télérama
- 1997: Fresu, Pellen, Marchand trio : Condaghes, Silex, Choc de la Musique
- 1998: Erik Marchand et le Taraf de Caransebes : Dor, BMG, ffff Télérama, Choc de la Musique, R 10 de Répertoires
- 2001: Kan, gant l'ensemble de Mallakaster d'Albanie, Le Tenore de Santu Predu (Sardaigne), Fransy Gonzales-Calvo (Galice) ha Bassey Koné (Mali), fff Télérama
- 2003: La Route de la Rose, Attitudes
- 2003: Le Requiem d'Anna Ac'hmatova
- 2003: Ephéméra Jacques Pellen Naïve
- 2004: PRUNA Erik Marchand et les Balkaniks Harmonia Mundi 2741260
- 2013: Ukronia

== Decorations ==
- Chevalier of the Order of Arts and Letters (2016)
