= Donatien Laurent =

French musicologist (1935–2020)

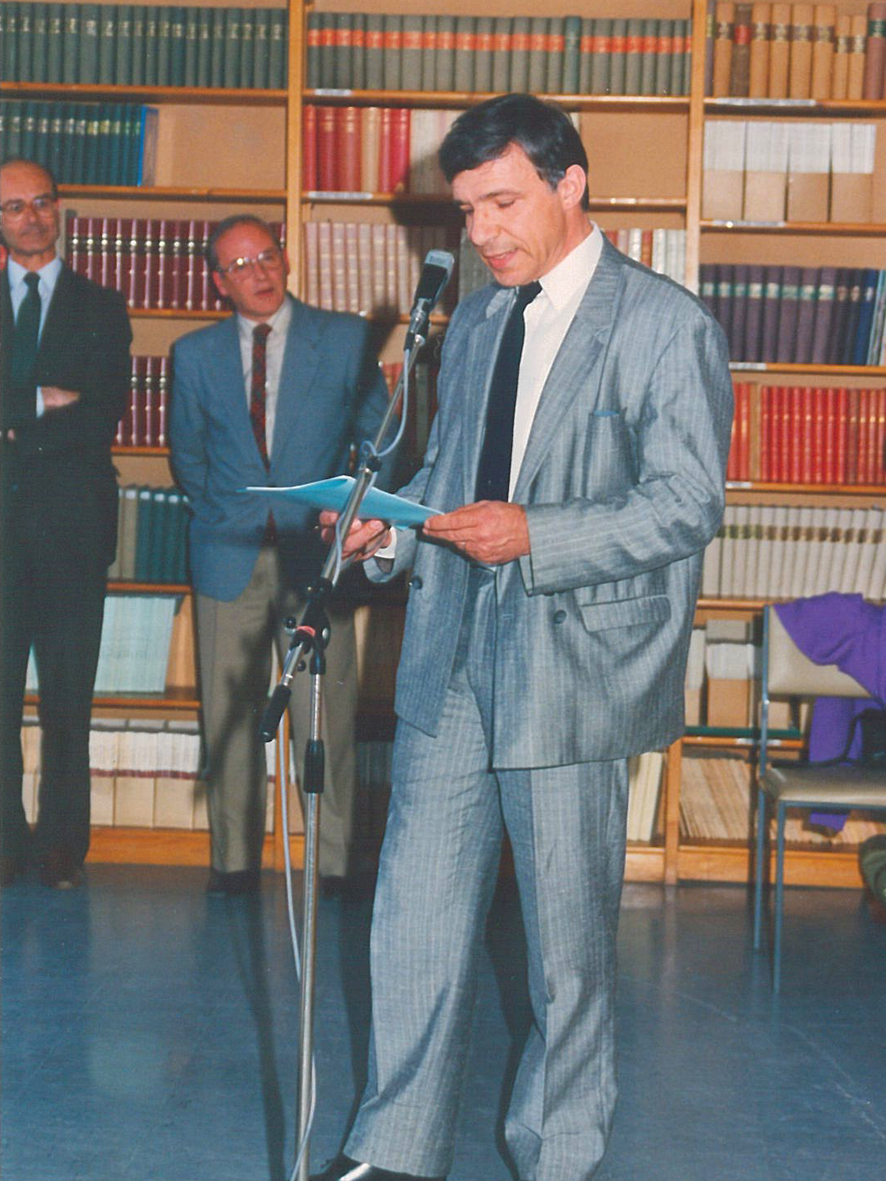
- Born: 27 September 1935; Belfort, France
- Died: 24 March 2020 (aged 84); Brest, France
- Occupations: Musicologist; Linguist

Donatien Laurent (27 September 1935 – 24 March 2020) was a French musicologist and linguist.

== Biography ==
Donatien was born in Belfort.

He is the son of the polytechnician Pierre Laurent and a musician mother from Nantes.

During his secondary education in Paris, he discovered Breton culture. He joined the Bleimor Scouts and became a bagpiper. He joined his friend Herri Léon in a program at the College of Piping. The two friends revolutionized the bagpipe in the bagadoù, which would create conflicts with Bodadeg ar Sonerion.

As part of his interest in Breton music, Laurent accompanied his friends as a teenager to Paris to make sound collections of music from Bro Gwened. His first solo recording came in the summer of 1956 in Le Conquet on his brother's tape recorder.

After a serious accident the following year which left him in a coma for 18 days, Laurent was declared by doctors unfit to continue studies. Therefore, he devoted himself to research on Breton culture. He was licensed to conduct research by Paris-Sorbonne University under the supervision of André Leroi-Gourhan. Later, Gourhan offered to help Laurent conduct research in Plozévet in 1964. During his time in Plozévet, Laurent met a descendant of Théodore Claude Henri, vicomte Hersart de la Villemarqué at the Manoir de Keransquer.

In 1965, Laurent met his eventual wife, Françoise Prigent. She actively supported him during his writing of Sources de Barz. With La Villemarqué's descendant, Laurent was able to obtain many original collections of notebooks which helped in the writing of Barzaz Breiz. Laurent used these works to aid his thesis, written in 1974.

Laurent directed the Center for Research on Breton and Celtic (CRBC) and the University of Western Brittany for twelve years. In 2015, Dastum, alongside the CRBC and Laurent, created an online platform for his works, including 136 surveys conducted between the 1950s and the 1970s.

Donatien Laurent died on 24 March 2020 in Brest at the age of 84.

== Books ==
- La Gwerz de Louis Le Ravallec (1967)
- La Gwerz de Skolvan et la légende de Merlin (1971)
- Berc'het, la déesse celtique du Menez Hom (1971)
- Aux origines du Barzaz-Breiz (1974)
- Autour du Barzaz-Breiz : Le Faucon (Ar Falc'hon) (1977)
- Aymar de Blois et les Premières Collectes de chants populaires bretons (1977)
- Récits et contes populaires de Bretagne, réunis dans le pays de Pontivy (1978)
- Aux sources du Barzaz-Breiz : la mémoire d’un peuple (1989)
- Chant historique français et tradition orale bretonne (1994)
- La Bretagne et la Littérature orale en Europe (1995)
- La Nuit celtique (1996)
- Herri Léon et le Scolaich beg an treis (2004)

== Distinctions ==
In 2010, Laurent was distinguished by the Cultural Institute of Brittany for his work, and received a medal from the Order of the Ermine.

In 2014, the Jardin Donatien-Laurent was established in Locronan.
