= Marie-Josèphe Bertrand =

Marie-Josèphe Bertrand, Joze 'r C'hoed in Breton (1886–1970), was a Breton singer of traditional songs. Some of the songs she sang were recorded in the late 1950s by Claudine Mazéas, and began circulating among lovers of Breton language and literature in the 1960s.
