= Dastum =

Dastum is a Breton cultural organization based in Rennes, the capital of the Ille-et-Vilaine department of France, in the region of Brittany. Founded in 1972, its mission is "to collect, protect and promote the cultural heritage of Brittany."

Dastum maintains a large archive containing recordings of traditional music, folk tales, oral histories, and photographs, which are cataloged for public use. It makes 130,000 of its recordings available on its database free of charge.

== Films ==
- Of Pipers and Wrens, produced and directed by Gei Zantzinger, in collaboration with Dastum; Lois V. Kuter, ethnomusicological consultant (Devault, Pennsylvania: Constant Spring Productions, 1997).
