= Pluzunet =

Pluzunet Plûned
- Commune
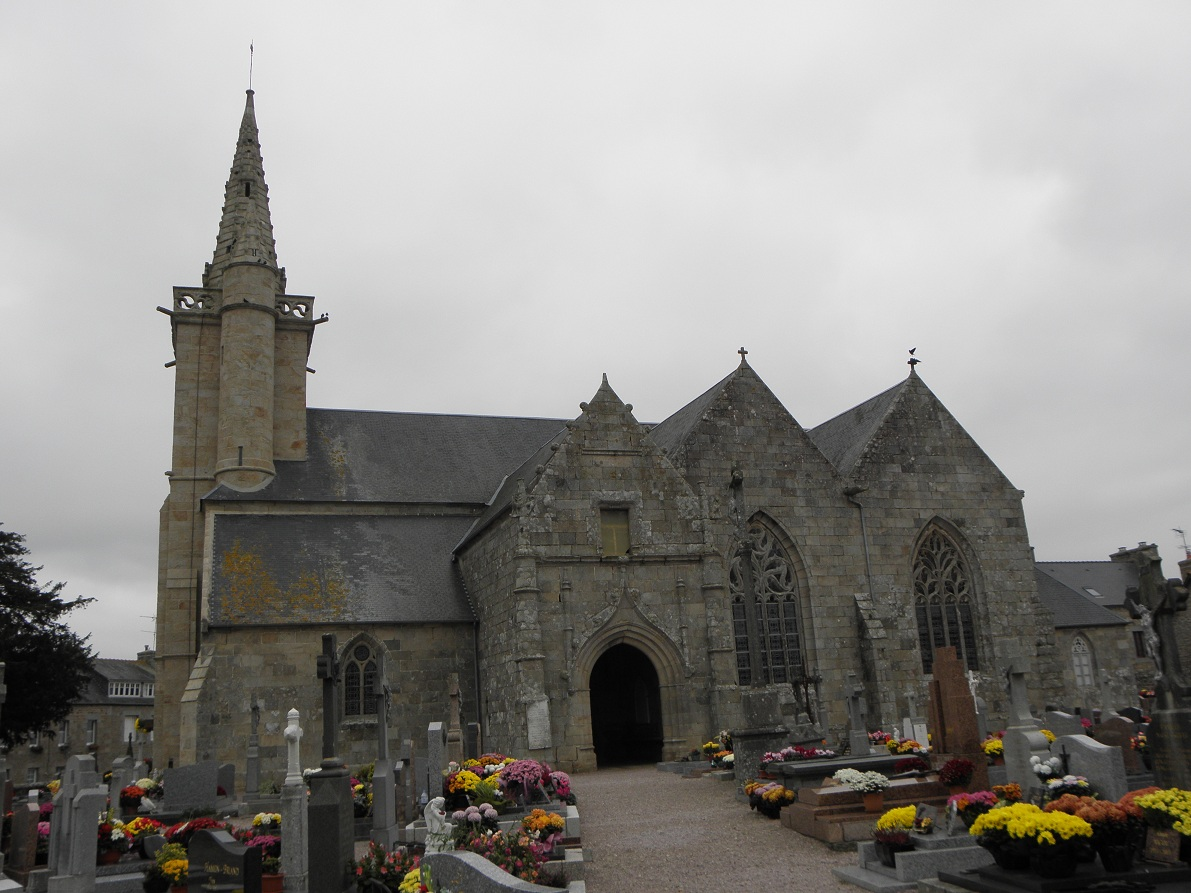
- The church of Saint-Pierre

- Coat of arms
- Location of Pluzunet
- Location within France Location within Brittany
- Coordinates: 48°38′32″N 3°22′06″W
- Country: France
- Region: Brittany
- Department: Côtes-d'Armor
- Arrondissement: Lannion
- Canton: Bégard
- Intercommunality: Lannion-Trégor Communauté

Government
  - Mayor (2020–2026): Romuald Cocadin
- Area^{1}: 22.87 km^{2} (8.83 sq mi)
- Highest elevation: 160 m (520 ft)
- Lowest elevation: 28 m (92 ft)
- Population (2023): 1,017
  - Density: 44.47/km^{2} (115.2/sq mi)
- Time zone: UTC+01:00 (CET)
  - Summer (DST): UTC+02:00 (CEST)
- INSEE/Postal code: 22245 /22140
- ^{1} French Land Register data, which excludes lakes, ponds, glaciers > 1 km^{2} (0.386 sq mi or 247 acres) and river estuaries.

Pluzunet (French pronunciation: [plyzynɛt]; Breton: Plûned) is a commune in the Côtes-d'Armor department of Brittany in northwestern France.

== Population ==
Historical population
Year	Pop.	±% p.a.
1968	1,149	—
1975	1,058	−1.17%
1982	1,036	−0.30%
1990	1,021	−0.18%
1999	986	−0.39%
2007	1,013	+0.34%
2012	1,016	+0.06%
2017	984	−0.64%
2023	1,017	+0.55%
Source: INSEE

Inhabitants of Pluzunet are called pluzunétois in French.

== See also ==
- Communes of the Côtes-d'Armor department
