= Magoar =

Magoar Magor
- Commune
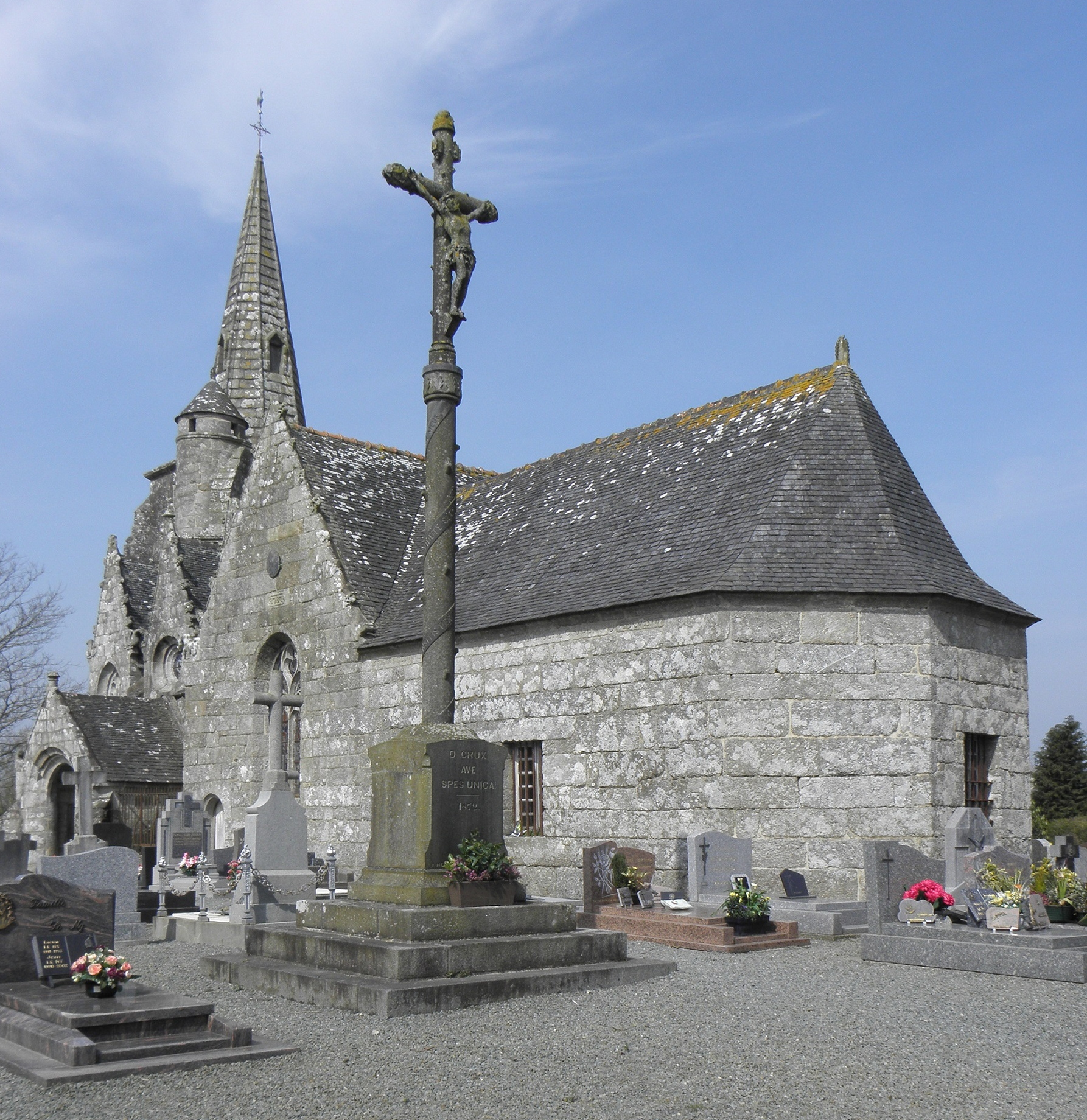
- The church of Saint-Gildas
- Location of Magoar
- Location within France Location within Brittany
- Coordinates: 48°23′51″N 3°11′09″W
- Country: France
- Region: Brittany
- Department: Côtes-d'Armor
- Arrondissement: Guingamp
- Canton: Callac
- Intercommunality: Guingamp-Paimpol Agglomération

Government
  - Mayor (2020–2026): Arnaud Gouriou
- Area^{1}: 7.79 km^{2} (3.01 sq mi)
- Highest elevation: 296 m (971 ft)
- Lowest elevation: 223 m (732 ft)
- Population (2023): 75
  - Density: 9.6/km^{2} (25/sq mi)
- Time zone: UTC+01:00 (CET)
  - Summer (DST): UTC+02:00 (CEST)
- INSEE/Postal code: 22139 /22480
- ^{1} French Land Register data, which excludes lakes, ponds, glaciers > 1 km^{2} (0.386 sq mi or 247 acres) and river estuaries.

Magoar (French pronunciation: [maɡwaʁ]; Breton: Magor) is a commune in the Côtes-d'Armor department of Brittany in northwestern France.

== Population ==
Historical population
| Year | Pop. | ±% p.a. |
|---|---|---|
| 1968 | 220 | — |
| 1975 | 172 | −3.46% |
| 1982 | 155 | −1.48% |
| 1990 | 114 | −3.77% |
| 1999 | 96 | −1.89% |
| 2007 | 90 | −0.80% |
| 2012 | 90 | +0.00% |
| 2017 | 86 | −0.91% |
| 2023 | 75 | −2.26% |
Source: INSEE

== See also ==
- Communes of the Côtes-d'Armor department
