= Barzaz Breiz =

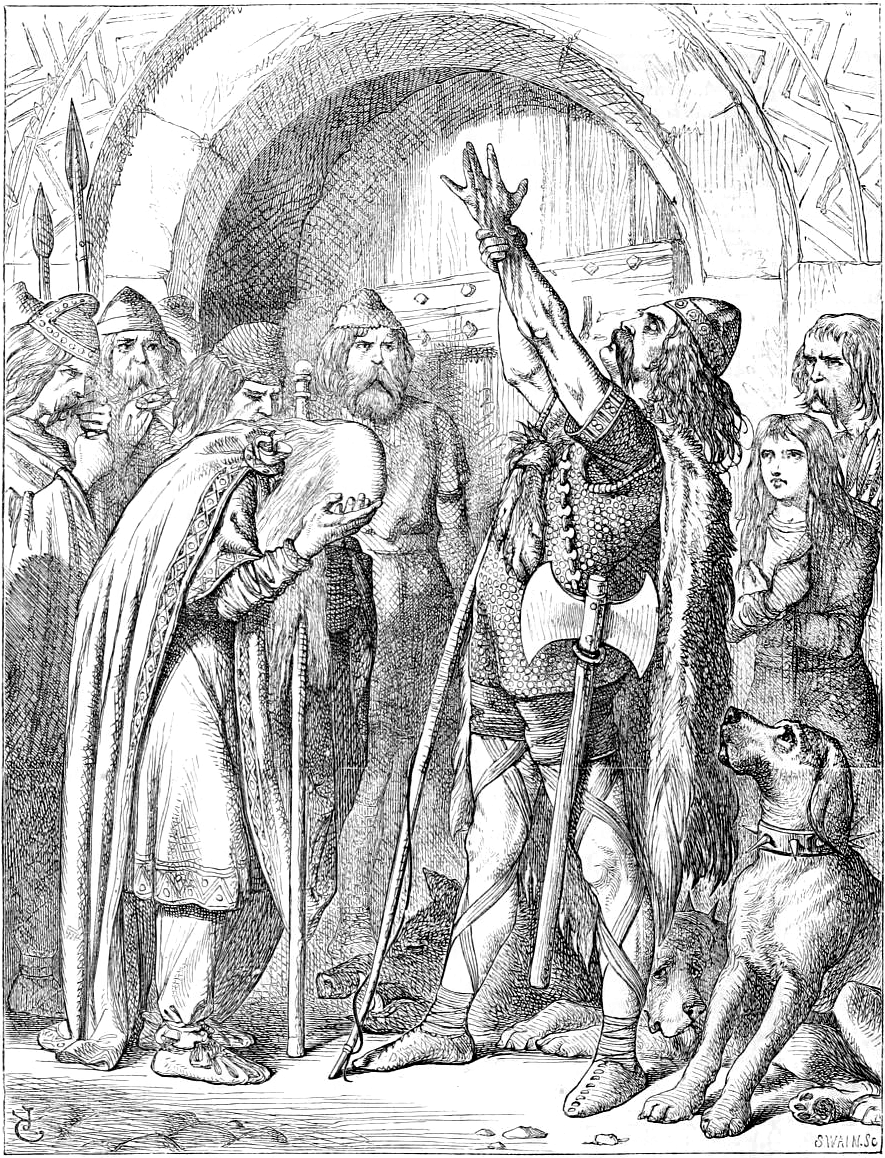
Nominoe's Vow, an illustration to the English translation of Barzaz Breiz, depicting the early Breton leader Nominoe vowing vengeance on the Franks for killing a Breton emissary

Barzaz Breiz (in modern spelling Barzhaz Breizh, meaning "Ballads of Brittany": barzh is the equivalent of "bard" and Breizh means "Brittany") is a collection of Breton popular songs collected by Théodore Hersart de la Villemarqué and published in 1839. It was compiled from oral tradition and preserves traditional folk tales, legends and music. Hersart de la Villemarqué grew up in the manor of Plessix in Nizon, near Pont-Aven, and was half Breton himself.

== Significance ==
The collection was published in the original Breton language with a French translation. It achieved a wide distribution, as the Romantic generation in France that "discovered" the Basque language was beginning to be curious about all the submerged cultures of Europe and the pagan survivals just under the surface of folk Catholicism. The Barzaz Breiz brought Breton folk culture for the first time into European awareness. One of the oldest of the collected songs was the legend of Ys. The book was also notable for the fact that La Villemarqué recorded the music of the ballads as well as the words. This was one of the first attempts to collect and print Breton traditional music, except hymns.

Until this publication the so-called Matter of Britain was known only from references to some legends in French language Romances of the 12th to 14th centuries, in which much of the culture was also transformed to suit Gallic hearers.

The book is divided into two parts. The first part collects ballads about historical legends and heroic deeds of Breton leaders, including Nominoe, Erispoe and the warriors of the Combat of the Thirty. The second part records local culture, concentrating on religious festivals and seasonal events.

== Authenticity ==
The publication of traditional folk literature was controversial at this time because of the dispute about the most famous of such collections, James Macpherson's The Poems of Ossian, which purported to be translated from ancient Celtic poetry, but was widely believed to have been largely written by MacPherson himself. After the publication of Barzaz Breiz, François-Marie Luzel criticised the work at a scholarly conference in 1868. At the 1872 Congress of the Breton Association at Saint-Brieuc, he argued that the songs had been completely manufactured in the manner of Macpherson, because, he said, he had never himself met with ballads in such elegant Breton and free of borrowed French words. The main problem raised by his opponents was that Villemarqué refused to show his notebooks to other scholars.

The dispute continued into the twentieth century. In 1907 La Villemarque's son, Pierre de la Villemarqué, published a defence of his father's work. However, in 1960 Francis Gourvil argued in a PhD thesis that the Barzaz Breiz was a forgery. In 1974 Donatien Laurent partially rejected these accusations by demonstrating the authenticity of the material of the book thanks to the discovery in 1964 of Villemarqué's notebooks. Laurent's research was published in 1989. Laurent concluded that Villemarqué had rearranged the material he had collected in order to enliven and clean up the texts and music, but that this was common practice at the time, comparable to work of the Brothers Grimm. An assessment of the dispute is given in the chapter "Collectors and Singers" of Mary-Ann Constantine's 1996 study Breton Ballads.

== Editions ==
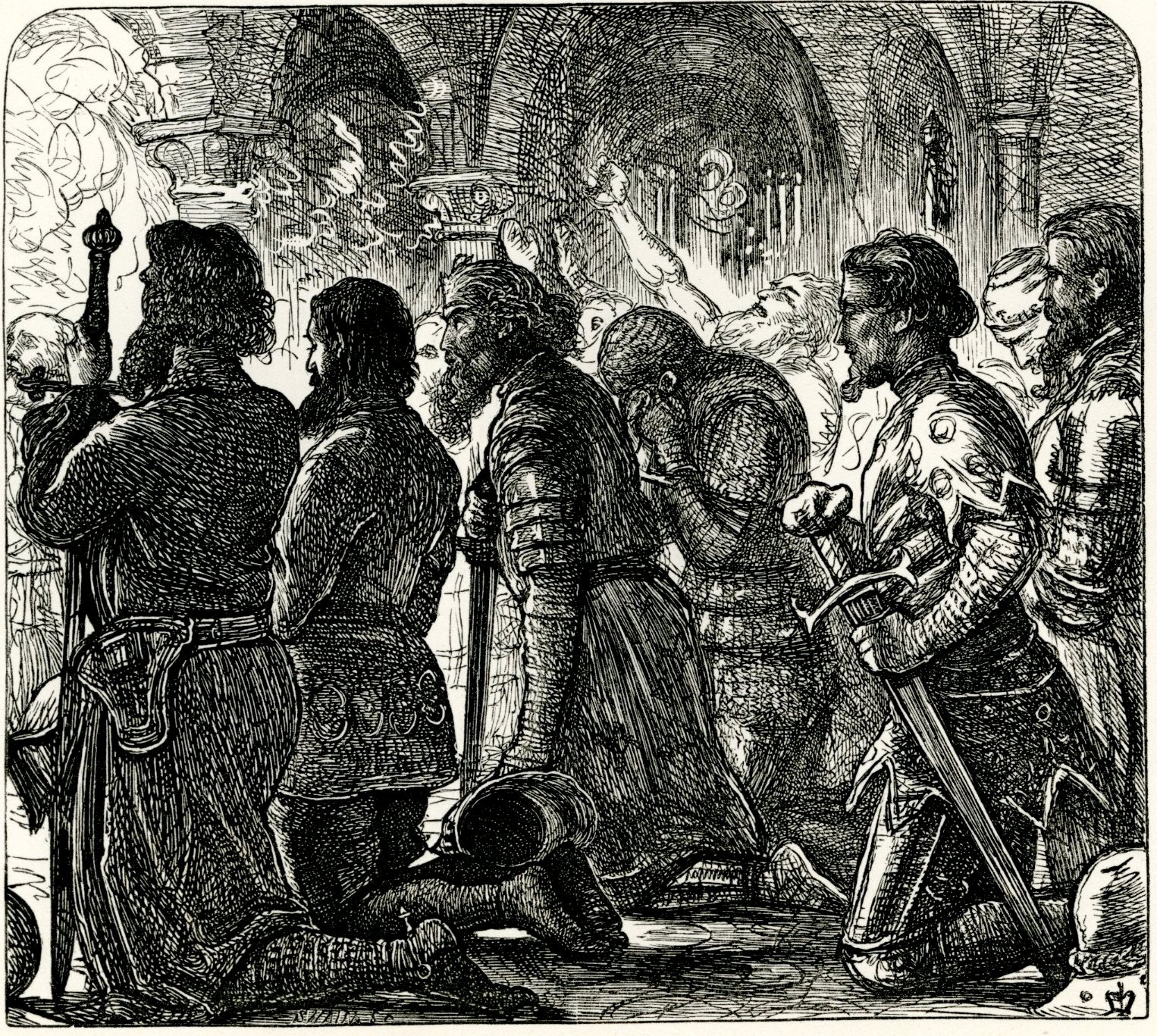
Jean de Beaumanoir's knights kneel in prayer before combat. Illustration by J.E. Millais to Tom Taylor's version of Barzaz Breiz

The first edition was published in 1839 in Paris by Éditions Delloye, in the form of books in 2 °-8. Reprinted in 1840, 1845 and, at Didier et Cie, 1846, the book was then published in 1867 in Paris.

In 1865 the standard English translation by Tom Taylor was published under the title Ballads and Songs of Brittany. The edition contained some of the original melodies "harmonized by Mrs. Tom Taylor", but omitted some of the ballads.

The 1867 edition was subsequently reprinted many times to the present day by the academic library Perrin, not counting the many English translations (Taylor, Fleay ... ), German (Keller-Seckendorf. ... ), Italian (Pascoli), Polish, and so on.

In 1981 a new edition appeared in pocket-sized format.

In 1989 Mouladurioù Hor Yezh issued a Barzhaz Breizh with only the Breton text, but changed into modern orthography and including the musical score.

In 1996, Coop Breizh published a pocket version of the book in French without the Breton text.

In 1999, Editions du Layeur issued a reprint of the 1867 edition, by Yann-Fañch Kemener, singer and collector, plus the foreword to the 1845 edition. The main merit is that he put Breton and French versions of each poem together ensuring a very high readability. A compact disc accompanies the book provides a performance of twelve of the songs by Yann Fanch Kemener and "Maîtrise de Bretagne", solo and duo.

== See also ==
- Folk music
- Music of Brittany
