= Yann-Fañch Kemener =

French traditional singer (1957–2019)

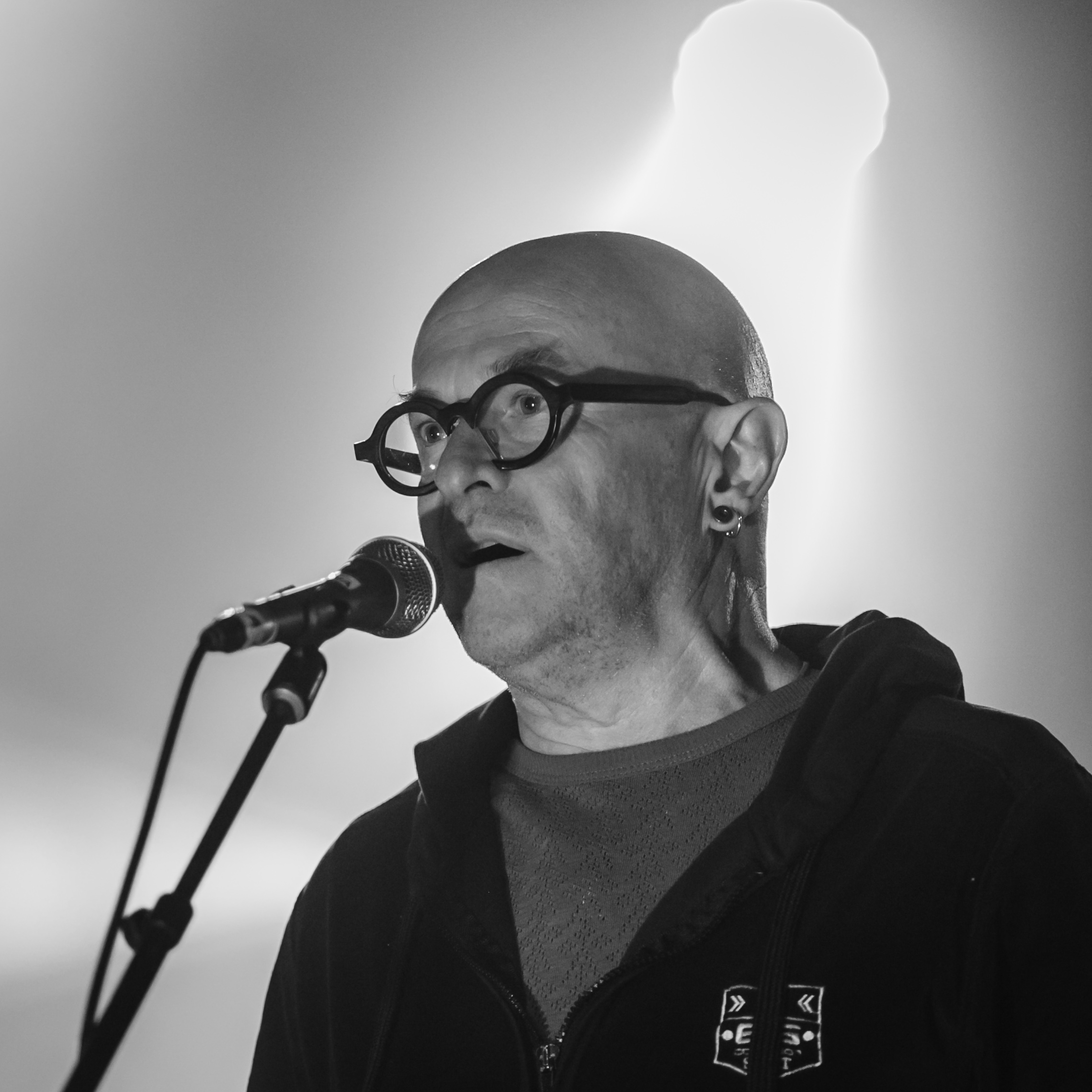
- Yann-Fañch Kemener performing in 2017
- Born: 7 April 1957; Sainte-Tréphine, Côtes-d'Armor, France
- Died: 16 March 2019 (aged 61); Tréméven, Finistère, France
- Other name: Jean-François Louis Quémener
- Occupations: Traditional singer; ethnomusicologist

Yann-Fañch Loeiz Kemener (French: Jean-François Louis Quémener; 7 April 1957 – 16 March 2019) was a traditional singer and ethnomusicologist from Brittany, born in Sainte-Tréphine, Côtes-d'Armor, France.

He took part in reviving the kan ha diskan form of traditional music in the 1970s and 1980s, especially with Erik Marchand. He collected songs from the oral tradition in the Breton language. He sang at numerous festoù noz (Breton festivals).

Kemener died in Tréméven on 16 March 2019 at age 61.

== Discography ==
- Chants profonds et sacrés de Bretagne, 1977
- Chants profonds et sacrés de Bretagne 2, 1978
- Chants profonds et sacrés de Bretagne 3, 1982
- Kan ha diskan, 1982, with Marcel Guilloux
- Chants profonds et sacrés de Bretagne 4, 1983
- Chants profonds de Bretagne, 1983
- Dibedibedañchaou, 1987, edited again by Dastum in 1999 (small songs for children in Breton language)
- Gwerziou et soniou, 1988
- Ec'honder, 1989, in Barzaz band
- Chants profonds de Bretagne, 1991
- Un den kozh dall, 1992, in Barzaz band
- Roue Gralon Ni Ho Salud, 1993, with Anne Auffret
- Chants profanes et sacrés de Bretagne - Roue Gralon ni ho salud, 1993
- Enez eusa, 1995, with Didier Squiban
- Ile-exil, 1996, with Didier Squiban
- Karnag / Pierre Lumière, 1996
- Carnet de route, 1996 (collected amongst old people)
- Kan ha diskan, 1997, with Valentine Collecter, Érik Marchand, Marcel Guilloux, Annie Ebrel, Claudine Floc'hig, Patrick Marie, Ifig Troadeg
- Kimiad, 1998, with Didier Squiban
- Barzaz Breiz, 1999, with La Maîtrise de Bretagne
- An Eur Glaz, 2000, with Aldo Ripoche
- An dorn, 2004, with Aldo Ripoche
- Dialogues, 2006, with Aldo Ripoche and Florence Pavie
- Si je savais voler, chants de Bretagne et d'Occitanie, 2010, avec Laurent Audemard, François Fava and Renat Sette
- Requiem d'Anne de Bretagne, 2011, on a cd with a recording of a Renaissance Requiem, with Ensemble Doulce Mémoire and Denis Raisin-Dadre
- YFK~2016, 2016, with Ba.fnu
