= François-Marie Luzel =

French writer (1821–1895)

François Marie Luzel
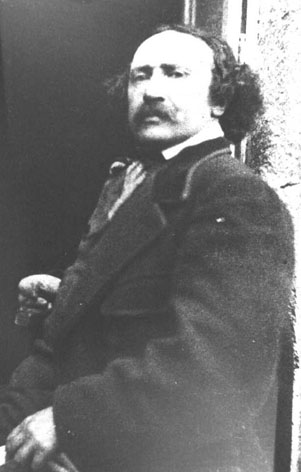
- Born: 6 June 1821; Plouaret, France
- Died: 26 February 1895 (aged 73); Quimper, France
- Occupations: ethnographer, poet, folklorist
- Writing career
- Pen name: Fanch ar Moal, Alan Bleung-Brug, Jean de Guernaham, Raoul Keramborgne, Jobik Berbiquet, Gabik Kergoz, Fanch Kerloho, Raoul Luzel.
- Genres: oral literature, folklore
- Notable works: Melodies and Songs from Low-Brittany

François-Marie Luzel (6 June 1821 – 26 February 1895), often known by his Breton name Fañch an Uhel, was a French folklorist and Breton-language poet.

== Biography ==
=== Early years ===
Luzel was born in the manor of Keramborgne, which then formed part of the commune of Plouaret (which, nowadays, is part of the commune of Le Vieux-Marché, Côtes-d'Armor. His father, François, and his mother, Rosalie le Gac, were peasants, but Luzel had a peaceful childhood in his home town, making friends (including the future painter Yan Dargent, and attending many veillées, which were traditional parties held after dark where the villagepeople would assemble and pass the long winter nights in one another's company, often listening to ancestral stories. Thanks to his uncle, Julien-Marie Huërou, he was able to go to the Royal College of Rennes, where Huërou taught.

=== School and a change of direction ===
There, he met the future historian Arthur de La Borderie, and Émile Grimaud, who became the sub-editor of the Revue de Bretagne et de Vendée. As a young man, he aspired to be a naval doctor, and went to study to such an end in Brest. Instead of becoming a naval doctor, he went down a different route towards being a professor, but could not find a fixed post, which made his life rather nomadic. An encounter with Adolphe Orain, a folklorist of Upper Brittany, gave him some direction, and, with the support of Ernest Renan, he managed to obtain from the Minister for State Education the means to go search for old literary texts in Basse-Bretagne. He succeeded in collecting a huge corpus of songs, tales, legends and plays, enough to make several books. The majority of the contents of this abundant collection came from Tréguier and the province of Brittany that surrounds it, Trégor. Marguerite Philippe (in Breton, Marc'harit Fulup) is amongst most known of the people whose folklore Luzel collected. After publishing a book including some of his own poetry in 1865, entitled Bepred Breizad, he published in 1868 a selection of the works that he collected, under the name Chants et chansons populaires de la Basse-Bretagne' (Melodies and Songs from Low-Brittany.) There were several volumes of this work, including a volume dedicated to Gwerziou (Laments) and Soniou (Songs.) A year later, a follow-up of sorts appeared, entitled Contes et Récits populaires des Bretons armoricains (Popular Tales and Stories of the Armorican Bretons).

=== Quarrel over Barzaz Breiz ===
At the 1872 Congress of the Breton Association at Saint-Brieuc, Luzel read a text that he had prepared, in which he raised suspicions about the authenticity of the songs included in the Barzaz Breiz, which was published by Théodore Hersart de la Villemarqué 33 years earlier. A public controversy ensued and his speech, which was rejected by the Breton Association, was heavily edited. The controversy surrounding Barzaz Breiz would last for more than a century. In 1960, the Breton scholar Francis Gourvil wrote a doctorate thesis in which he maintained that Luzel was right. In 1989, the musician and linguist Donatien Laurent demonstrated, in a thesis based on the manuscripts of La Villemarqué, that even if the author had revised the lyrics, he still nearly always relied upon the versions that he himself had collected or transcribed.

=== Journalist, justice, and archivist ===
Luzel's career trajectory changed yet again in 1874, when he started writing political editorials for the Republican newspaper, l'Avenir de Morlaix, where he would work until 1880. He was later made a justice of the peace in Daoulas.

In 1881, he found stable work as a curator of Quimper's Departmental Archives of Finistère. There, he encountered Anatole Le Braz, who would become his disciple of sorts and would continue his work in finding stories and making an inventory of pieces of Ancient Breton theatre.

Luzel was elected as a Republican to the municipal council of Quimper, and was later, in 1883, made Vice-President of the Archeological Society of Finistère, a group in which he participated for quite some time, and which La Villemarqué founded.

=== Defence of Breton ===
In 1888, Luzel asked Ernest Renan to intervene in the Ministry of Public Instruction, so that his friend, Anatole Le Braz, could teach Breton at the Quimper Lycée outside school hours, which Le Braz offered to do for free. In his letter to Renan, he stated that he 'would like that, in all our primary schools that Breton children attend, an hour or two were consecrated to teach them Breton by heart and to sing Breton songs and pieces of poetry to instill patriotism in them.' Later in the letter, he referred to the Breton language as being 'the national language.' This request would be flatly refused by the Ministry.

On 1 January 1890, Luzel was made knight of the Legion of Honour, an accolade that he received from the hands of his old rival, La Villemarqué, in a ceremony that took place on 30 January. Seemingly reconciled, the pair later died in the same year, 1895.

=== About the songs collected ===
Unlike La Villemarqué, Luzel did not collect or transcribe the arias of the songs he collected. It was Maurice Duhamel who undertook this task between 1909 and 1912, but with different singers. These arias, as well as those collected by François Vallée on wax rolls, were published in Musique bretonne by Maurice Duhamel in 1913.

== Bibliography ==
- Sainte-Tryphine et le roi Arthur, Quimperlé, Clairet (1863)
- Bepred Breizad. Toujours Breton, Poésies bretonnes, Morlaix, Haslé (1865).
- Chants et chansons populaires de la Basse-Bretagne, Soniou (2 volumes) et Gwerziou (2 volumes) (1868–1890). These 4 volumes were re-released in 1971 with an introduction by Donatien Laurent (mais sans aucun texte de D. Laurent à l'intérieur des volumes).
- Contes et Récits populaires des Bretons armoricains (1869), nouvelle édition : PUR, Terre de Brume (1996), text edited and introduced by Françoise Morvan, preface by Nicole Belmont,
- De l'authenticité des chants du Barzaz-Breiz de M. de La Villemarqué Saint-Brieuc, Guyon (1872)
- Chants et chansons populaires de la Basse-Bretagne, Gwerziou II (1874)
- Veillées bretonnes (1979) (new edition : PUR et Terre de Brume, 2002, texte edited and introduced by Françoise Morvan).
- Légendes chrétiennes de Basse-Bretagne Paris, Maisonneuve (1881) (nouvelle édition :PUR et Terre de Brume, 2001, texte présenté et établi par Françoise Morvan)
- Contes populaires de Basse-Bretagne Paris, Maisonneuve & Ch. Leclerc (1887) 3 Vol. with a preface and annotations by the author.
- La Vie de Saint Gwennolé, Quimper, Cotonnec (1889)
- Chants et chansons populaires de la Basse-Bretagne, Soniou (1890)

=== Posthumous works ===
- Kontadennou ar Bobl e Breiz-Izel Quimper, Le Goaziou (1939)
- Ma C'horn-Bro. Soniou ha gwerziou Quimper, Le Goaziou (1943).
- Gwerzioù kozh Breizh, col. “Studi ha dudi”, Al Liamm, 1970.
- Kontadennou ar Bobl (5 volumes), Al Liamm, (1984–1994)
- Contes traditionnels de Bretagne, 6 volumes (1994–1995), An Here-Hor Yezh-Mouladurioù Hor Yezh
- Journal de route et lettres de mission, Presses universitaires de Rennes et Terre de Brume, Rennes (1994)
- Contes bretons, PUR et Terre de Brume, Rennes (1994), texte établi et présenté par Françoise Morvan.
- Contes inédits Tome I, PUR et Terre de Brume, Rennes (1994), texts assembled and presented by Françoise Morvan
- Contes du boulanger, PUR et Terre de Brume, Rennes (1995), texts assembled and presented by Françoise Morvan
- Contes inédits Tome II, PUR et Terre de Brume, Rennes (1995), texts assembled and presented by Françoise Morvan
- Contes retrouvés Tome I, PUR et Terre de Brume, Rennes (1995), texts assembled and presented by Françoise Morvan
- Correspondance Luzel-Renan, PUR et Terre de Brume, Rennes (1995), texts assembled and presented by Françoise Morvan
- Nouvelles Veillées bretonnes, PUR et Terre de Brume, Rennes (1995) (Françoise Morvan edition)
- Contes inédits Tome III, Carnets de collectage, PUR et Terre de Brume, Rennes (1996), translation by Françoise Morvan by Marthe Vassallo, critical analysis by Françoise Morvan.
- En Basse-Bretagne (impressions et notes de voyage), Hor Yezh, 1996, ISBN 2-910699-17-X
- "Notes de voyage en Basse-Bretagne", PUR et Terre de Brume, Rennes (1997), texts assembled and presented by Françoise Morvan
- Contes retrouvés Tome II, PUR et Terre de Brume, Rennes (1999), texts assembled and presented by Françoise Morvan
- Sainte Tryphine et le roi Arthur , PUR et Terre de Brume (2002, preface by Françoise Morvan.
- Santez Trifin hag ar roue Arzur, Emgleo Breiz.
- Yezh ar vuhez. A selection of poems by Luzel, edited by Per Denez, extracts from the above works.
- Contes de Basse-Bretagne, selected by Françoise Morvan, Ouest-France (2007) ISBN 2-7373-4089-6

== See also ==
- P. Batany, Luzel, poète et folkloriste breton. 1821–1895. Rennes, Simon (1941)
- Joseph Ollivier, Les contes de Luzel (Preface by Per Denez, followed by a postface about “Breton Stories” Pur-Terre de Brume, 1994), Hor Yezh, 1995 ISBN 2-910699-11-0
- Françoise Morvan, François-Marie Luzel, biographie, Terre de Brume et PUR, Rennes (1999)
- (in French)
