= Théodore Claude Henri, vicomte Hersart de la Villemarqué =

French Breton writer (1815–1895)

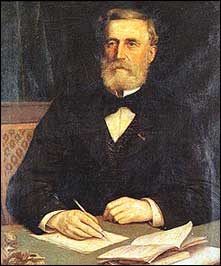
- Born: 6 July 1815; Quimperlé, Brittany
- Died: 8 December 1895 (aged 80); Quimperlé, Brittany
- Occupation: Philologist

Théodore Claude Henri, vicomte Hersart de la Villemarqué (6 July 1815 – 8 December 1895) was a Breton philologist and man of letters.

== Biography ==
La Villemarqué was born in Quimperlé, Finistère on 6 July 1815. He was descended from an old Breton family, which counted among its members an Hersart who had followed Saint Louis to the Crusades, and another who was a companion in arms of Bertrand du Guesclin. La Villemarqué devoted himself to the elucidation of the monuments of Breton literature. Introduced in 1851 by Jakob Grimm as correspondent to the Academy of Berlin, he became in 1858 a member of the Académie des Inscriptions et Belles-Lettres. He died at Castle Keransker near Quimperlé on 8 December 1895.

== Works ==
His works include: Contes populaires des anciens Bretons (1842), to which was prefixed an essay on the origin of the romances of the Round Table; Essai sur l'histoire de la langue bretonne (1837); Poèmes des bardes bretons du sixième siècle (1850); La Légende celtique en Irlande, en Cambrie et en Bretagne (1859). The popular Breton songs published by him in 1839 as Barzaz Breiz were considerably retouched. La Villemarqué's work has been superseded by the work of later scholars, but he has the merit of having done much to arouse popular interest in his subject.

== Literature ==
On the subject of the doubtful authenticity of Barzaz Breiz, see Luzel's Preface to his Chansons populaires de la Basse-Bretagne, and, for a list of works on the subject, the Revue Celtique (vol. V).
