= Gwerz =

Breton folk song

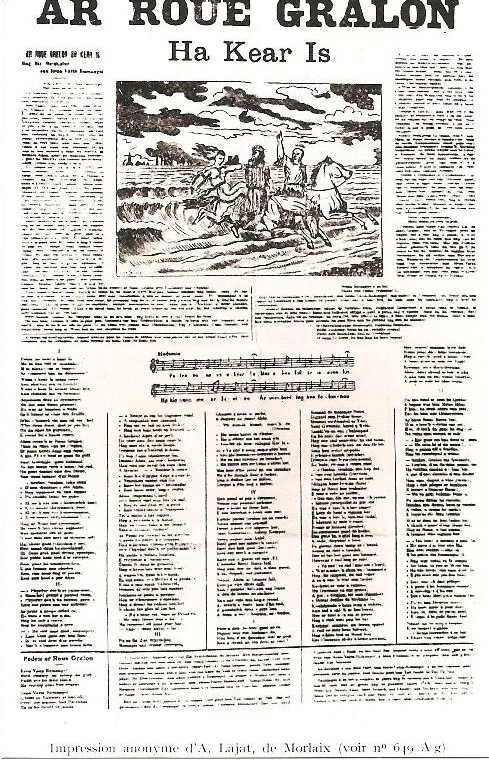
Lyrics and sheet music for the gwerz "Ar Roue Gralon Ha Kear Is" ("King Gradlon and the City of Ys", written by Olivier Souêtre in 1850)

Gwerz (Breton: [ɡʷɛ̞ʀz], "ballad", "lament", plural gwerzioù) is a type of folk song of Brittany. The word "gwerz" is related to the term versus in Latin, which means verse. This evokes the poetic nature of these songs. In Breton music, the gwerz tells a story which can be epic, historical, or mythological. The stories are usually of a tragic nature. The gwerz is characterised by an often monotonous melody and many couplets, all in the Breton language. Though historically sung unaccompanied, some modern musicians use limited instrumentation with the gwerz.

Famous performers in gwerzioù are Marc'harid Fulup, Erik Marchand, Yann-Fañch Kemener, and Denez Prigent.

== Notable gwerzioù ==
- An hini a garan
- Gwerz Skolan
- Gwerz Santes Enori
- Gwerz Kêr Is
- Gwerz ar vezhinerien
- Ar Roue Gralon ha Kear Is
- Marv Pontkalleg

== See also ==
- Gwerz (band)
