= Hôtel Gabriel =

Buildings in Lorient, France

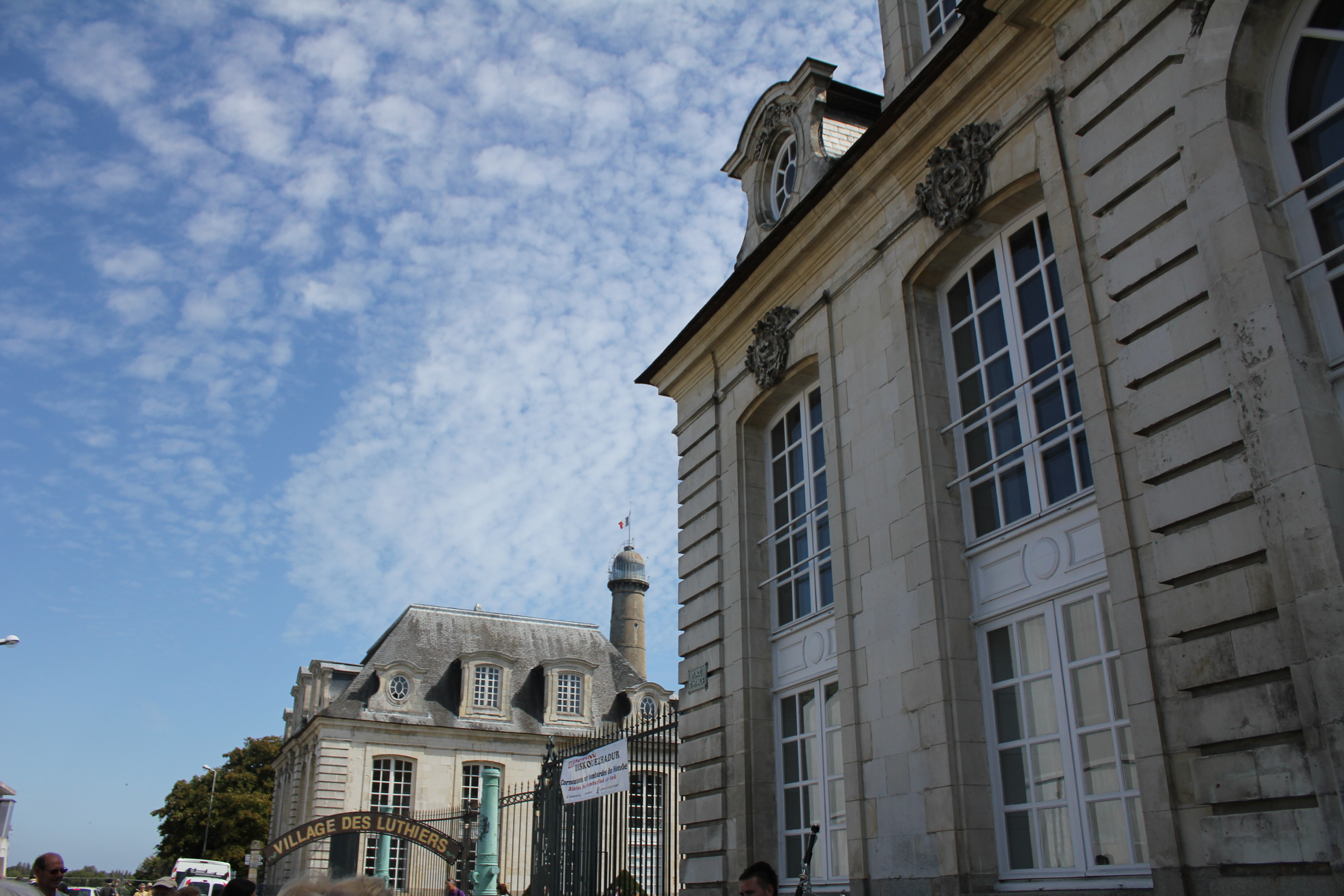
- Interactive map of the Hôtel Gabriel area

General information
- Location: Arsenal, Lorient commune, Bretagne region., France
- Coordinates: 47°44′44″N 3°21′19″W
- Owner: Lorient town

Design and construction
- Architect: Jacques Gabriel
- Awards: Listed historical monument (1930)
- Designations: Former Auction house. Nowadays a Municipality archive, city services, and exhibition rooms.

The Hôtel Gabriel (Note: In French, hôtel refers to hôtel particulier and not a place of lodging.) is a group of 18th-century buildings located in the Peristyle in Lorient, France. Designed by Jacques Gabriel, it was commissioned by the Compagnie Perpetuelle des Indes to build an auction house for its merchandise.

The two pavilions are built symmetrically and in a classical style. They are located on either side of a main courtyard, surrounded to the south by a two-hectare French garden, and to the north by a parade ground. Destroyed by Allied air action during World War II, it was rebuilt identically between 1956 and 1959.

Reclaimed by the Royal Navy in 1770 after the dissolution of the Compagnie perpétuelle des Indes, it was used by its staff for almost two centuries. In 2008, the municipality of Lorient bought the buildings and installed its archives and architecture and heritage services.

== History ==
=== Early plans for the Compagnie des Indes ===
The city of Lorient experienced a major boom in 1719, when John Law de Lauriston created the Compagnie perpétuelle des Indes by purchasing several other trading companies, and chose the city as his base of operations. The Royal Navy, which then occupied the city's maritime facilities, was reluctant to let the new company use the facilities in the harbor enclosure, but on June 28, 1719, the Conseil de la Marine ordered it to vacate the premises, which it did by the end of the same year. In 1732, the Compagnie perpétuelle des Indes decided to transfer the headquarters of all its sales from Nantes to Lorient, thus requiring the construction of new facilities to accommodate buyers.

The architect Jacques Gabriel (1667–1742) was contacted by the company long before the decision to move from Nantes to Lorient was taken, and sent Louis de Saint-Pierre, with whom he had worked on the Château de Versailles construction site, to scout the site. A first project for an auction house was drawn up in March 1732, and others followed in the following months, but proved too ambitious for the company's finances at the time. In May, a more sober project on the banks of the Scorff was selected, and Gabriel came to Lorient in July to sign the adjudication and mark out potable water points for future construction. The foundation stone was laid on September 1, 1733, but the slow pace of construction forced the architect to reduce the size of the building to keep it on schedule, as sales were due to start in autumn 1734.

=== Construction of the current hotel ===
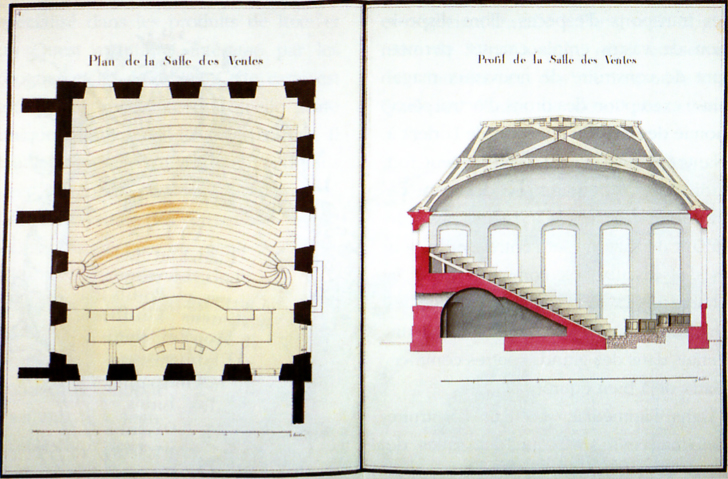
Period plan of the auction room.

From 1739 onwards, the business activities of the Compagnie perpétuelle des Indes were expanding, and the increase in sales led not only to a rise in the company's resources, but also to the need for larger facilities, as the first auction houses built were proving too small. An earlier project was revived, located near the entrance to the harbor enclosure, and featuring a structure "formed of three vaults", inspired by the spaces of the Grand Trianon. It also included a large central main building linking two pavilions, but only the latter two were built between 1740 and 1742.

Sales began immediately after completion in 1742, and up to twenty-five million livres tournois were traded here annually. The company's monopoly was abolished in 1769 under the pressure of the physiocrats, and the hotel ceased to be used for auctions.

=== Navy use ===
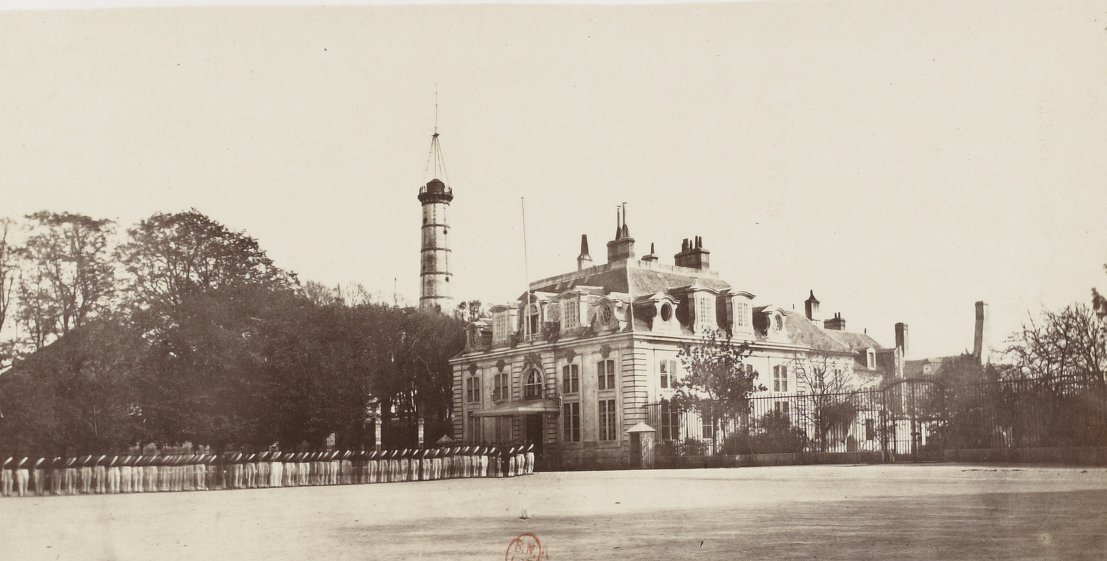
East wing of the Hôtel Gabriel circa 1866.

The two pavilions were transferred back to the Royal Navy on April 28, 1770. From 1783 to 1784, they were the site of the council of war following the defeat at the Battle of Les Saintes. The property was sold during the revolutionary period in 1790, and in 1808 the Maritime Prefecture established its headquarters here. The east wing was used for the maritime prefect's apartments and reception rooms, while the west wing was used by the maritime prefecture's staff and various departments.

During World War II, German troops occupied the premises, using them as a command post for the German Navy and port management, and building a cellar and blockhouse in the basement. The buildings burned down during the 1943 bombing raids that destroyed most of the town. (Note: The town, home to the Lorient Submarine Base, was razed to the ground by over 4,000 tonnes of bombs between January 14th and February 17th, 1943.)

Between 1956 and 1959, the building was restored to its original state but the interior fittings were altered to accommodate the French Navy. From 1959 to 2000, the building housed the headquarters and departments of the French Navy.

=== Acquisition by the city of Lorient ===
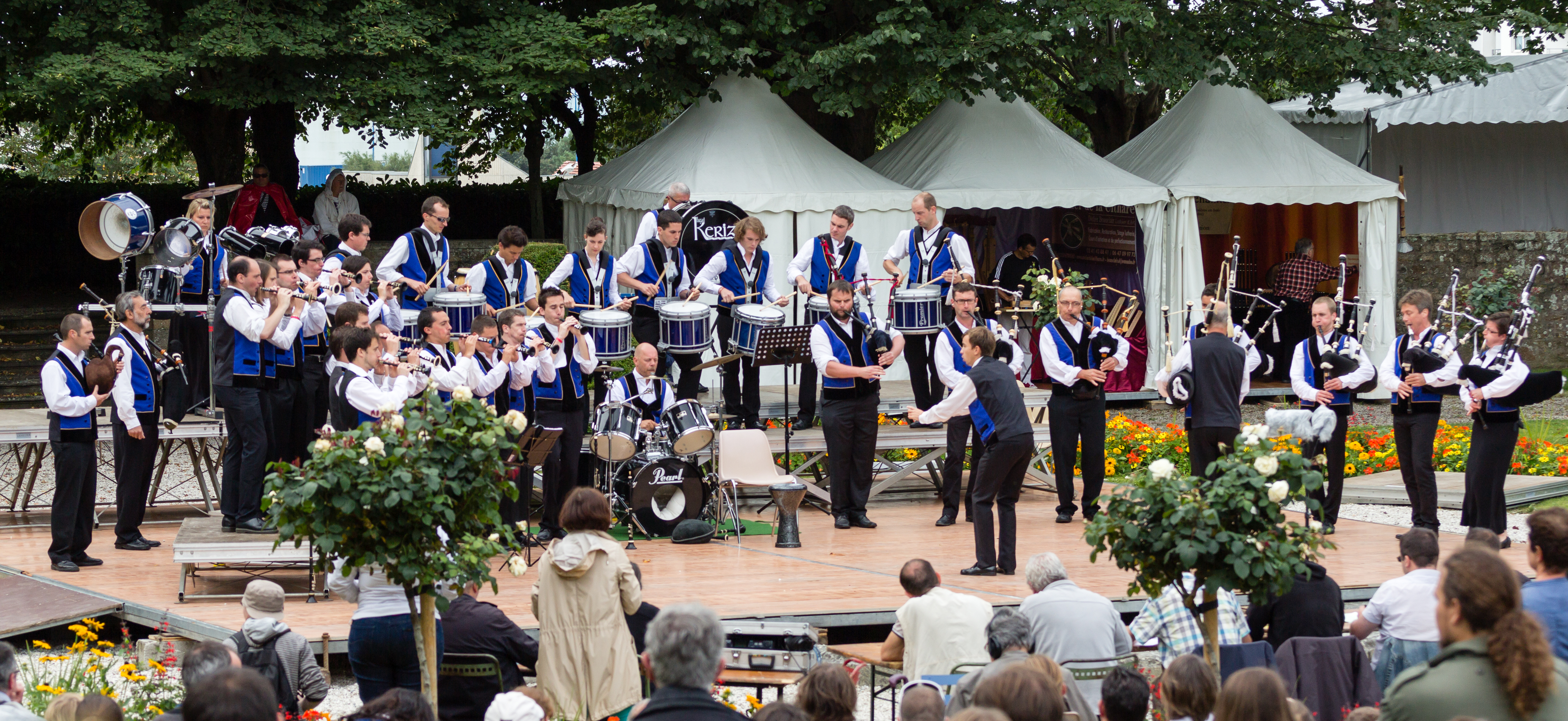
The 2012 National Bagadoù Championship takes place in the gardens of the Hôtel Gabriel.

In 2000, the city of Lorient acquired the Hôtel Gabriel. Since then, it has housed the city's Architecture and Heritage department since 2008. In 2010, the municipal archives moved to the second floor of its west wing, while the first floor opened its reception, documentation, studio, and exhibition rooms to the public. They were joined in 2014 by the "Le Lieu" exhibition gallery.

The site is also occasionally used for other events, such as the Festival Interceltique de Lorient and the National Bagadoù Championship.

=== Heritage protection ===
This complex of buildings has been listed as a historic monument since September 22, 1930. The roofs and façades of the two pavilions framing the entrance gate, as well as the Council Chamber, are listed as well.

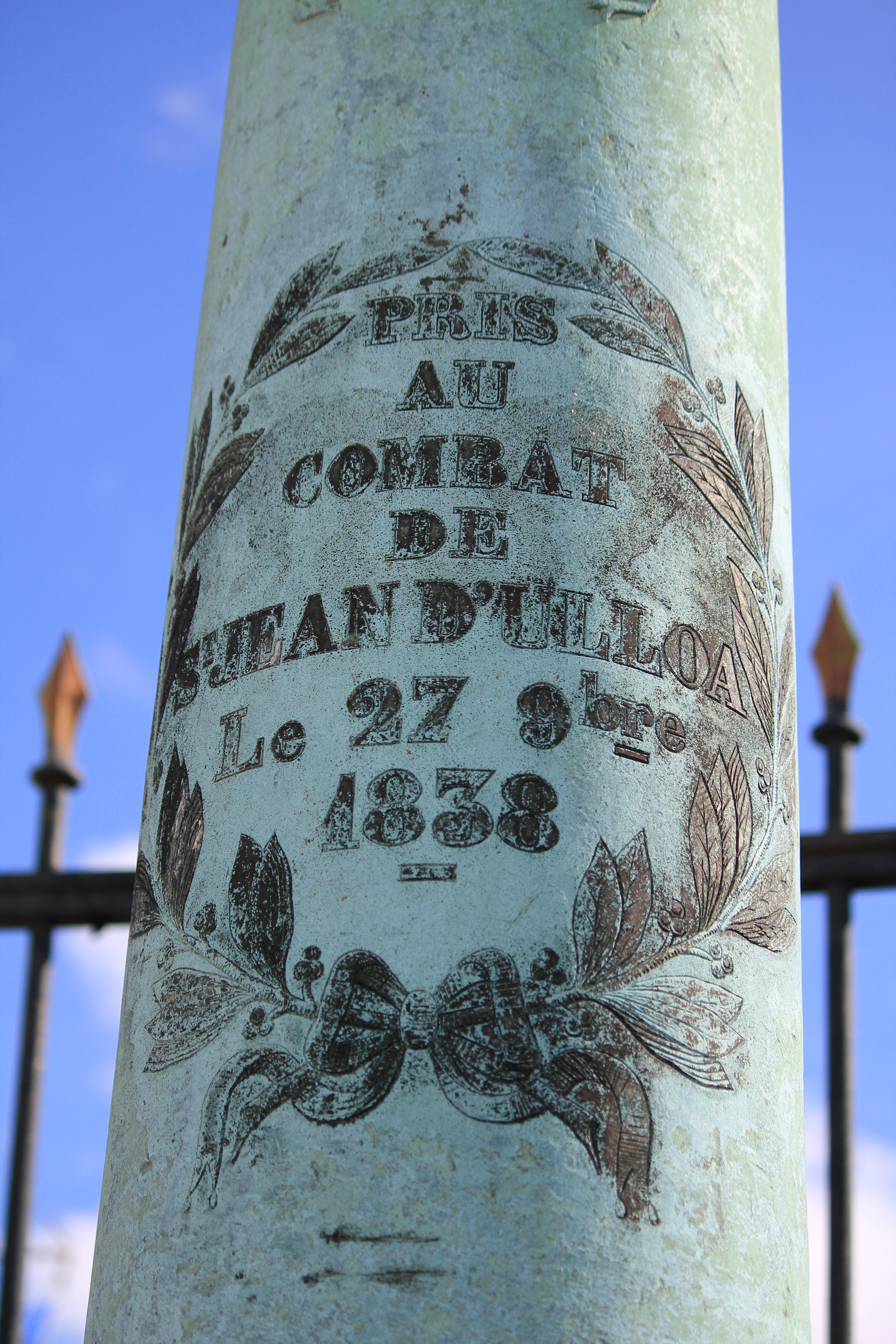
Detail of the cannon captured during the Pastry War.

== Location and outdoor features ==
The entrance to the complex consists of a gateway of iron lances linking the two pavilions and separating them from the main square to the north. A cannon is positioned on either side of the gate, one dating from the time of Louis XV (1751), cast at the Douai cannon foundry, the other being a war prize taken from San Juan de Ulúa in 1838 during the Pastry War.

A French garden of 2 hectares extends to the south. It is crossed in a north–south line by an axis providing perspective to the ensemble, and is composed of parterres in geometric shapes arranged around a circular water surface in the center of the garden. The whole is framed by avenues and rows of trees, and is bordered to the south by a raised terrace.

== Building details ==
The monumental ensemble comprises two symmetrical pavilions built in a classical style, each extended to the south by two lateral wings, and composed of granite ashlar on the lower section and limestone on the upper. The west pavilion originally housed the auction room. Originally, the corps de logis was to be set up between these two pavilions, but was never built.

Roof openings are identical in both wings. On the Place d'Armes side, to the north of the buildings, there are five bays whose upper sections are aligned at three heights; the central window is the highest, and the dormers at the ends are the lowest. These openings also feature plant and floral elements. Inside, on the courtyard and garden sides, the windows are the same height as those on the north side, but with simpler finishes and no ornamentation.

The north façades feature five rows of openings aligned with the roof bays, with the access doors located in the central rows. At the top of these two access openings stand mascarons, each depicting the face of a Greek divinity. In the west pavilion is the face of the war goddess Athena, also associated with craftsmanship and shipbuilding techniques. She is shown with many of her traditional attributes: warrior (helmet, armor, spear), naval (compass, square, spyglass), as well as an owl and a flute with sheet music. In the east pavilion stands Hermes, associated with trade and travelers. He is depicted wearing his customary winged petasos and surrounded by two caduceus (a staff with two wings, around which two snakes coil, facing each other at the top). The interior façades are simpler, with no particular decoration.

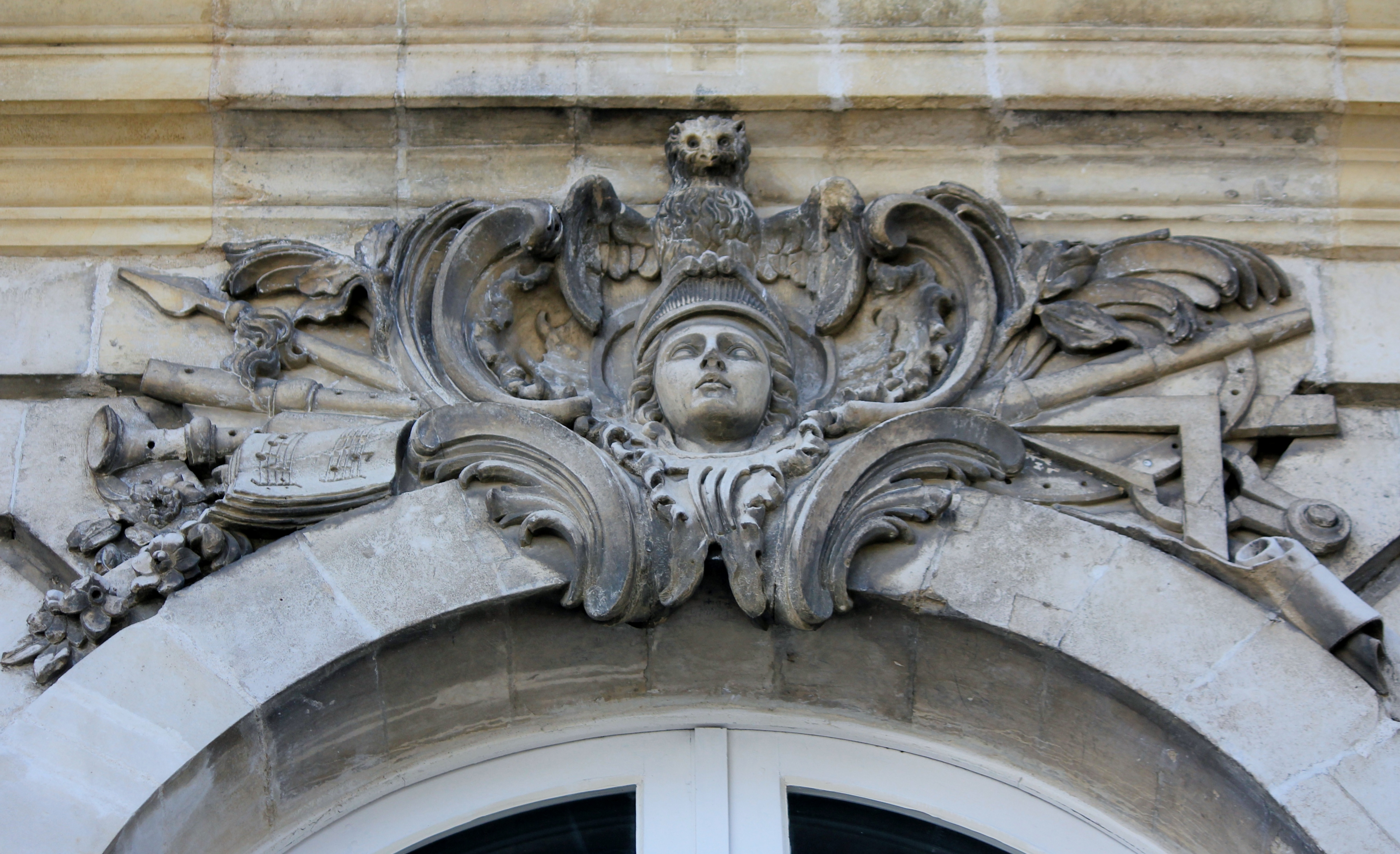
Athena on the west pavilion.

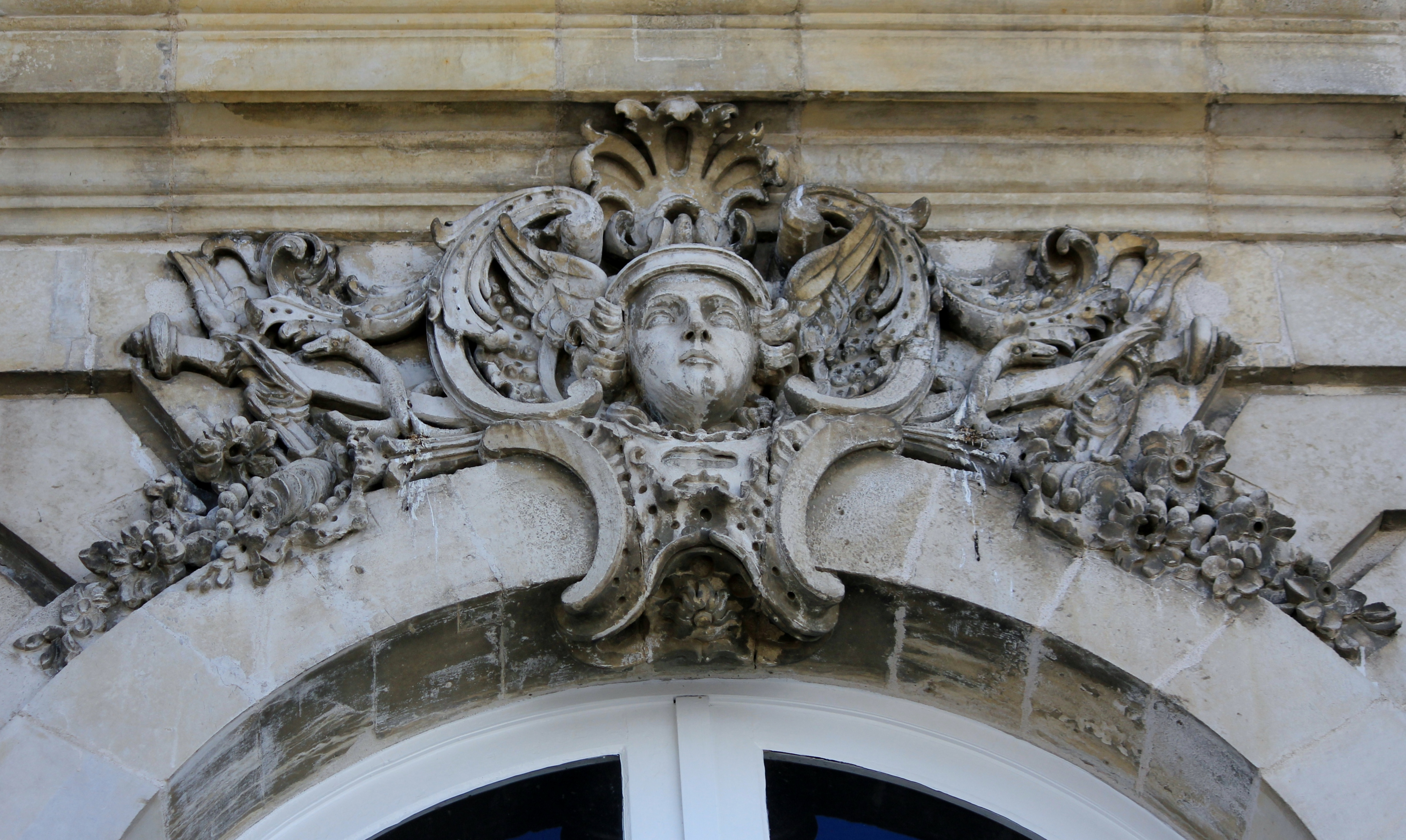
Hermès on the east pavilion.

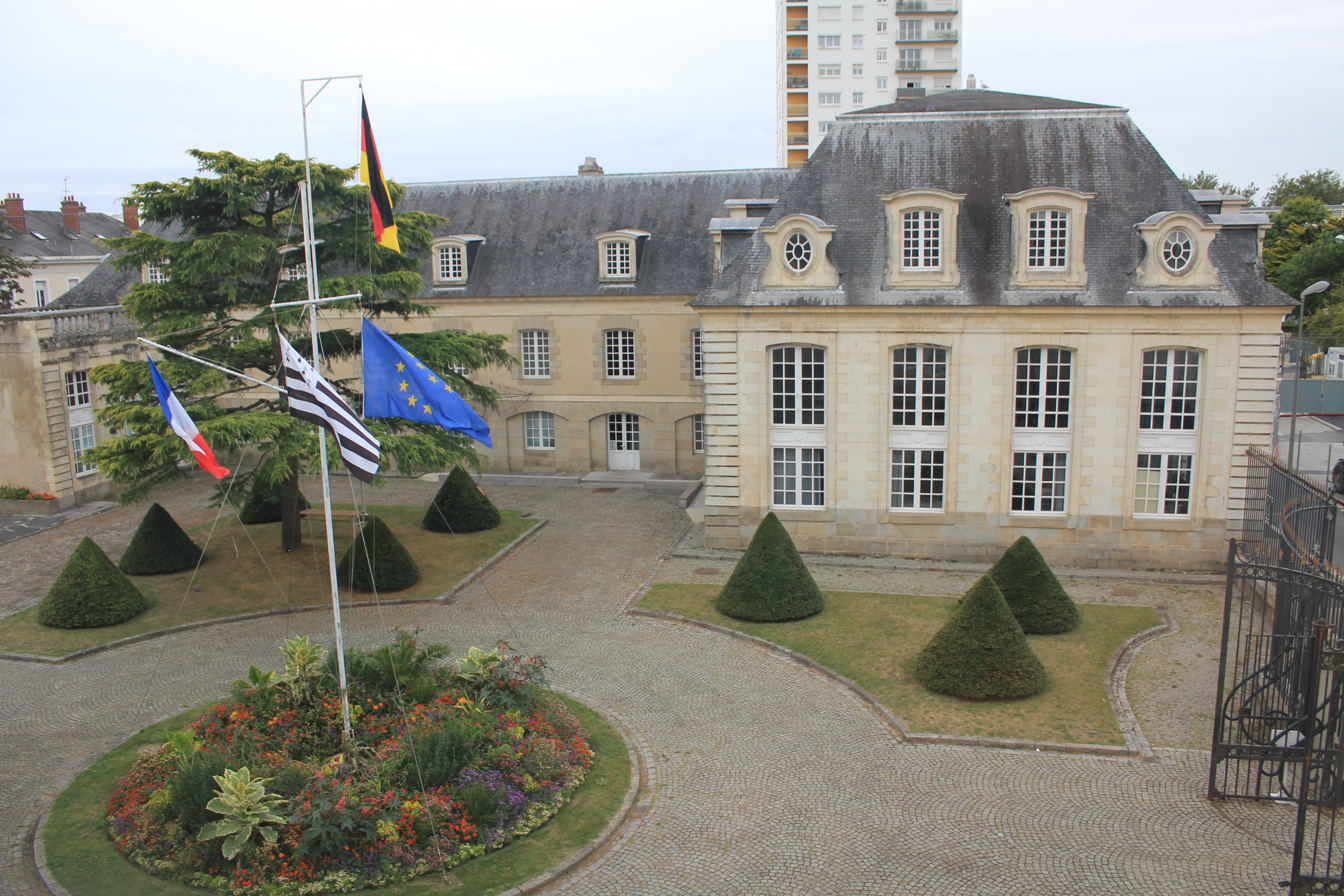
Simple façades and windows inside the complex.

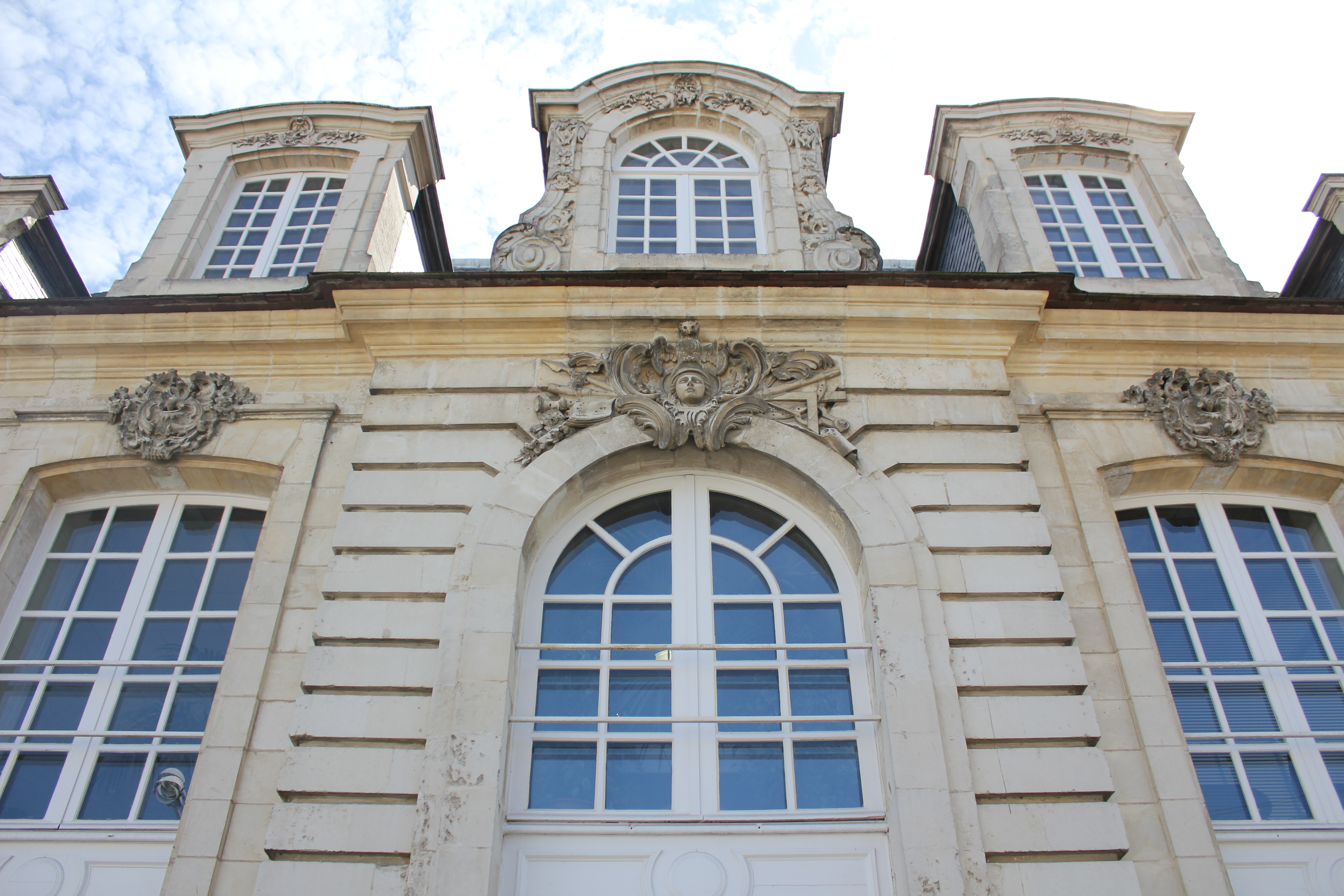
Ornamented openings on one of the two north façades.

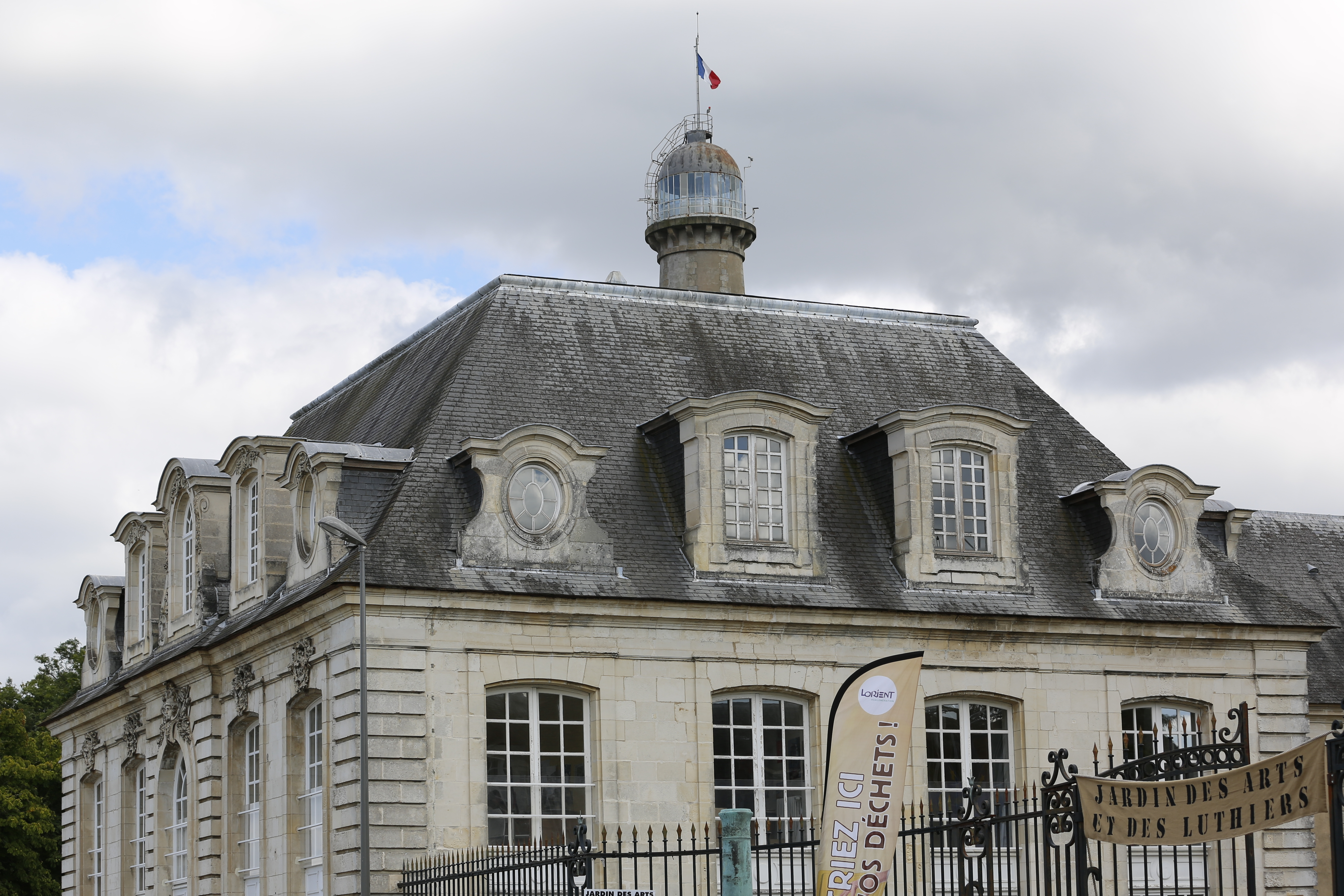
Roof view of the dormer windows.

== See also ==
- French Indies Company
- Jacques Gabriel
- Projects by Jacques Gabriel in the same region: fr:place du Parlement-de-Bretagne, Rennes City Hall, Hôtel de Blossac.
