= Kerlenn Pondi =

Musical group from Morbihan

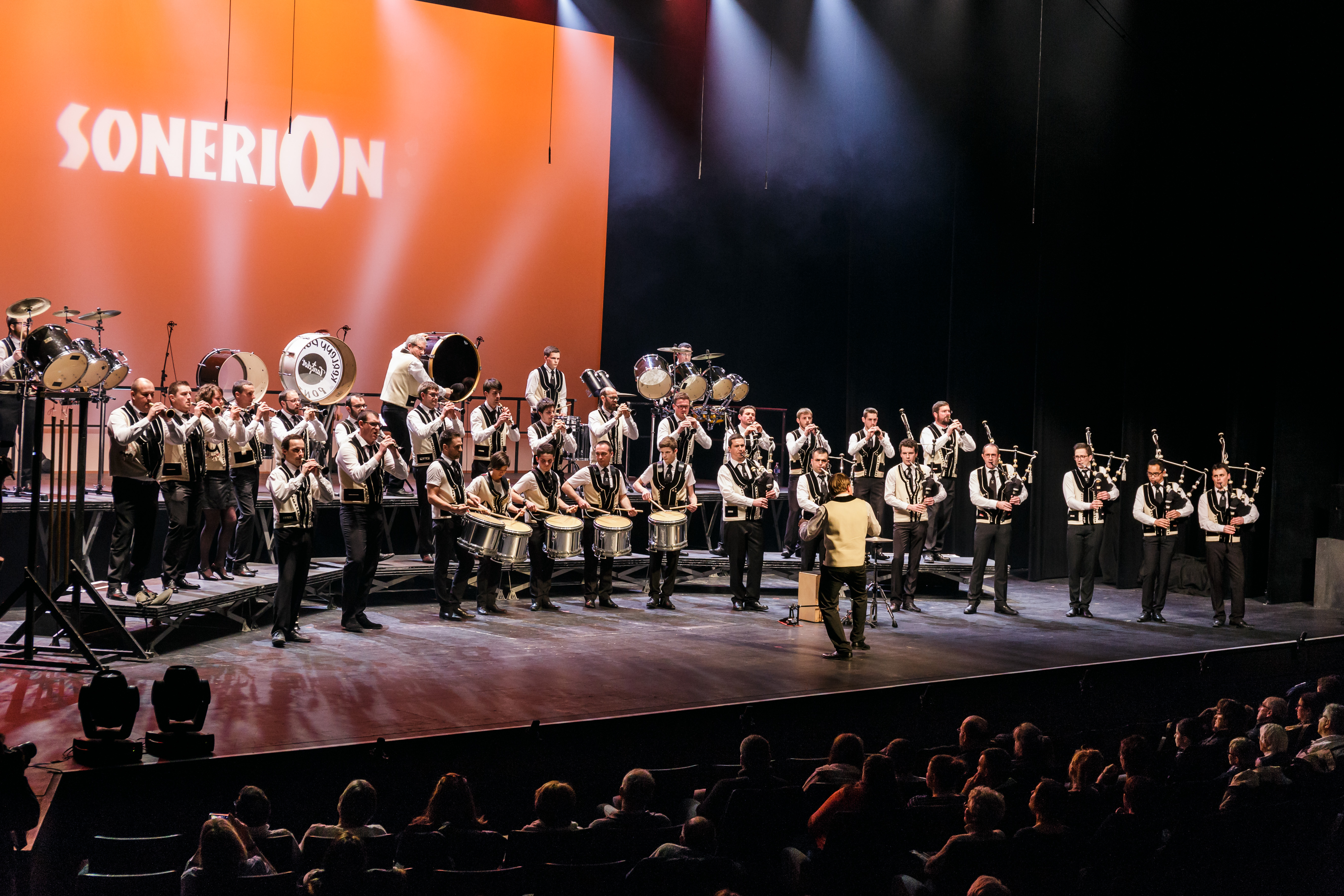
- The bagad at the 2017 national bagadoù championship in Brest.

Background information
- Origin: France
- Genres: Music of Brittany
- Instruments: Bombard, bagpipes, snare drum, percussion instrument

Kerlenn Pondi is a traditional Breton music group comprising a bagad and a Celtic circle. It was founded in Pontivy, Morbihan, in 1953 based on two older groups, the Garde Saint-Ivy and the "Moutons Blancs". It inherited the name of the latter association as its nickname, due to the woolly color and texture of the region's costumes.

In 2015 his bagad was ranked in the first category of the National Bagadoù Championship, having won it just once before, in 2001. It has also produced five albums since its creation. The Cercle Celtique is also in the top category of the Kendalc'h competitions, having won just once in 1966. These two groups frequently perform together and have been instrumental in preserving the music of Britanny and dance tunes such as the laridé-gavotte and gavotte Pourlet.

The association is also active in other areas of Breton culture, such as the Breton language and the organization of events like Kan ar Bobl.

== History ==
=== Les Moutons Blancs ===
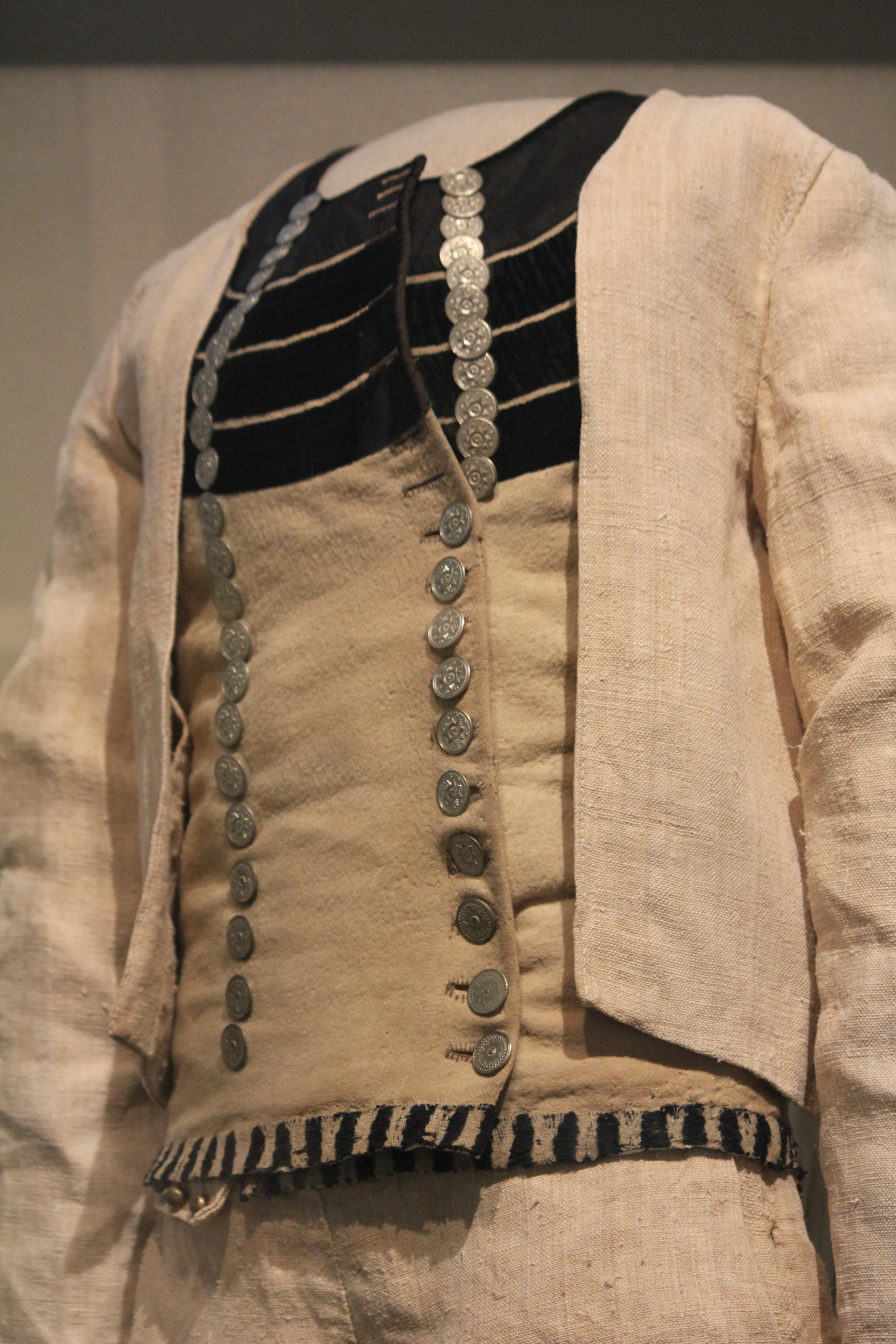
Costume from the Pontivy region, early 20th century.

Kerlenn Pondi was preceded by two other groups, several of whose members later joined the organization, bringing with them management skills and know-how. The "Moutons Blancs" ensemble was directed by Pierre Ropert from 1932 to 1939 and focused its activities on the conservation of traditional regional costumes and Breton dance. It performed throughout France, notably in Nice in 1939 and at the 1937 Universal Exhibition in Paris. However, the Second World War brought an end to the group's activities; its leader Pierre Ropert, a member of the Pat O'Leary resistance network, died in deportation, and the group was not revived after the war. The secular group, which was recruited from the city's bourgeois milieu, included shopkeepers, lawyers, and doctors. Some of its members were to join the Kerlenn Pondi after the war, forming its cadres.

A second group, the Garde Saint-Ivy clique, was a Catholic patronage clique whose membership was more popular and whose reputation was limited to Pontivy. Its demise in 1948 left a void in the town's musical life; several of its members joined and structured the Kerlenn in its early days.

=== Founded under the impetus of Abbé Le Teuf ===
Brittany experienced a revival in cultural expression from the late 1940s onwards, with the creation of the first bagadoù. This movement motivated a former leader of the Garde Saint-Ivy, Abbé Le Teuf, to create a similar group in Pontivy in 1953, as other musical groups of this type had already been created by ecclesiastics in previous years. With the help of Canon Guyonvarc'h, archpriest of Pontivy, who provided a parish hall at Vieux-Chemin for the group's activities, Le Teuf began recruiting musicians through the Café Autret, which was then frequented by many local ringers. The first rehearsal took place in October 1953, with three musicians and a singer, and the articles of association of "Kerlen Pondi" (with a single n) were filed on 1 June 1954. From the outset, the group was a member of Bodadeg ar Sonerion and Kendalc'h, the former association federating bagadoù, the latter dealing more broadly with Breton culture. Le Teuf's project was not limited to a musical aspect but was part of a broader cultural approach, including Breton dance.

The group's initial recruits include former Breton ringers, as well as young people from the working-class district of Tréleau. The group's priorities were to equip the young ringers with instruments and costumes; to this end, parades were organized every Sunday to raise money to buy instruments. The instruments were first ordered from Dorig Le Voyer, BAS's official supplier, then from another instrument maker, André Laurenceau from Nantes, and finally, for the bagpipes, from Scottish suppliers. Costumes were acquired from the musicians' families, from local elders, or through inheritance.

Instrumental learning is done by imitating older musicians, as instrumental methods were little or undeveloped at the time without solfeggio instruction. All learners began with the bombarde, before moving on to the biniou kozh, whose fingering was very similar; the first pieces learned most often included the Cadoudal march, or the Marche de Pontivy written by Jef Le Penven. The bagad's first official outing was in Pontivy in March 1954, when it was asked to accompany a soccer match between two of the town's guilds. The following month, it was invited to perform outside the city walls at a motocross race in Pluméliau, accompanied this time by three other Morbihan bagadoù from Gourin, Guémené, and Landaul. Their first participation in a competition was recorded in 1957, but the group failed to make it into the second category, at a time when Morbihan bagadoùs were outclassed by those from Finistère or Rennes and Nantes.

The Cercle Celtique developed along the same lines as the Bagad, recruiting members by word of mouth from working-class neighborhoods such as Château-Gaillard. On the other hand, some of the town's notables, including former members of Les Moutons Blancs, were part of the management team. Exchanges with the bagad were limited in the early years to the participation of a bombarde-biniou pair for musical accompaniment, as the two groups did not aim for the same type of artistic production. Competitions got off to a better start than those of the bagad, with the Cercle taking fifth place in the 1957 Brittany championship.

Other activities were organized in the early years of the Kerlenn, such as a choir and theatrical experiments, but their existence was shorter. Abbé Le Teuf was appointed to Pontivy in 1958, and management of the group fell to Abbé Corvec.

=== Dynamic Blanchard years ===
Abbé Blanchard took over from Abbé Péron as head of the group when he was appointed vicar in the Pontivy parish in 1966. Although Abbé Blanchard knew nothing of Breton music, he did have a technical background in music from his seminary studies, during which one of his teachers, Auguste Le Guennant, had introduced him to Béla Bartók's work on Hungarian music. He soon enlisted the help of Jean-Claude Jégat, head of the bombarde section, to modernize the band. As early as 1967, he made it compulsory for beginners to learn solfeggio, and brought them together in a specific group, prefiguring the bagadign 6.

Musically, the group underwent several changes. Blanchard took up the snare drum, an experience from which he drew one of the first learning methods, and introduced the use of harmony in the group's compositions, whereas previously the group had played in unison: this was an innovation in bagad music, introduced a few years earlier by ringers from Kevrenn Brest Sant Mark and Kevrenn de Rennes. This work enabled the bagad to reach the second category of the National Bagadoù Championship in 1967, and then the first category in 1970. Blanchard also began collecting local tunes, wrote a few for the Kerlenn, and took on a role comparable to that of a conductor during the group's performances, something then forbidden by BAS regulations. A second disc was released in 1972, following the first recording made in 1960.

The dance underwent several evolutions. The laridé-gavotte was enjoying renewed interest at the time and was integrated into the repertoire of both the cercle and the bagad. For the first time in 1968, the two groups performed together on stage at a festival in Combourg. Under the impetus of Raphaël Hellec, the teaching of the dances was reviewed, as were the costumes used during the dances, which were simplified with the abandonment of the hat and then the jacket, unsuited to dynamic dances. Choreography was also modernized. At the same time, the Cercle won its only title, the 1966 Brittany championship.

The group also experimented with the organ-bomb duet by Jégat and Louis Yhuel. Blanchard had to leave the Kerlenn in 1971 when he was appointed rector of Quistinic, but continued to follow and help the group regularly.

=== Reconstruction around 1980 ===
The departure of Abbé Blanchard weakened the group, and in 1976 the bagad was forced to drop down to the second category due to poor results in competitions, before stabilizing in the third category in the following years. The trend was reversed in 1982, when the group won the third category competition, enabling it to move up to the higher category. The improvement continued; a first place in 1983, a third place in 1986, and a first place in 1988 enabled them to return to the first category in 1993.

The structure of the ensemble evolved, and new articles of association were filed in 1978, qualifying Kerlenn as a "Breton cultural ensemble". Premises problems forced the group to move to the former Keropert school in 1984, then to the former Resto school in 1986. La Kerlenn saw the reopening of the bagadig in 1992 after several years of dormancy, followed by the creation of the White Sheep Pipe Band, the association's pipe band, in 1995.

The dance group achieved several good results during this period, including fourth place in the 1991 championship. Theatrical experiments were also produced during this period, based on the Camp de Conlie episode in 1978, on nuclear energy in 1979 at a time when the Plogoff affair was in the news, on the practice of soule in 19th-century Brittany in 1991, and the plague in 1995.

=== Established as a major player in Breton music ===
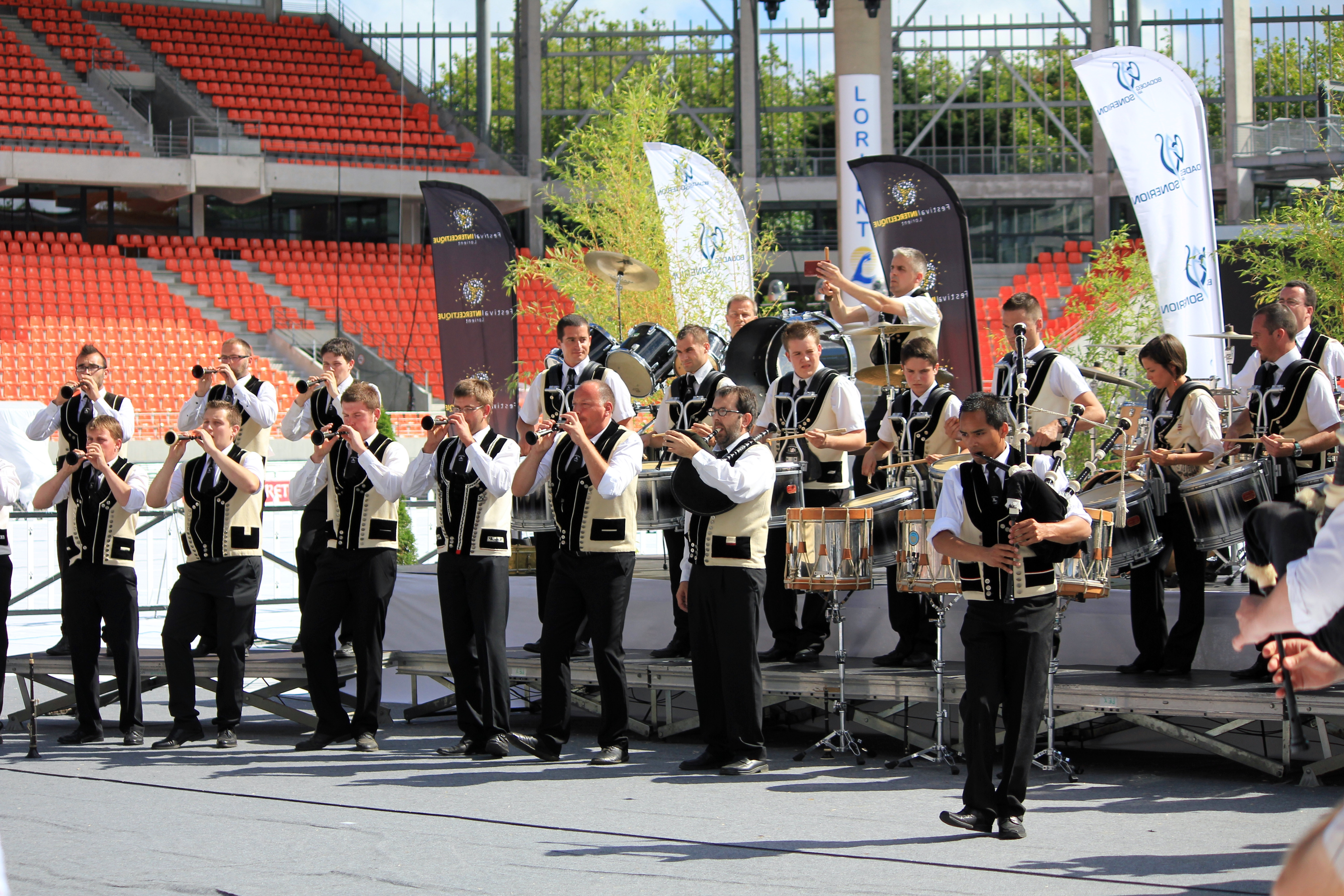
Performance at the 2013 National Bagadoù Championship in Lorient.

The bagad began to compete with the best groups in the late 1990s. After finishing runners-up in the National Bagadoù Championship in 1997 and 1999, the bagad went on to win the title in 2001. However, it failed to repeat this success in subsequent editions. In 2014, the cercle, in collaboration with the bagad, presented a choreographed suite evoking the Bonnets Rouges revolt, which enabled it to regain the championship's first category, which it had vacated four years earlier. The following year, he won the title of vice-champion of Brittany.

The number of musical creations and collaborations multiplied. After playing with Alan Stivell in 2001, the band accompanied Marc Steckar in 2003. Three albums were released during this period: Fest A Gren in 1997, then Kerlenn Pondi in 2001, and A-Gevet in 2011.

Several performances and trips are notable during this period. As part of the St. Patrick's Day celebrations, he performed at the Stade de France in 2002 and 2003 and at the Palais omnisports de Paris-Bercy in 2005, 2006, 2007 and 2008. In 2007, as part of the Breizh Touch event, he marched down the Champs-Élysées. Trips outside Europe were organized at the same time, to French Guiana in 1998, China in 2005, and Nepal in 2010.

== Structure ==
=== The association ===
Kerlenn Pondi is organized in the form of an association under the law of 1901, whose articles of association were filed with the prefecture on 1 June 1954. Since 2014, it has been led by Cyrille Berthou (from the bagad and former member of the bagadoùs of Le Havre and Cesson-Sévigné) and by a board of directors whose average age in 2012 was 27.

In 2013, the association counted 215 musicians and dancers, divided between the various groups for a total of around 250 members and an average age of between 35 and 40. At the same date, just over a thousand people had joined the association since it was founded.

In addition to its activities centered on the bagad and the Celtic circle, the association is also involved in Breton language courses and in helping to organize events such as the Kan ar Bobl.

List of presidents :
- 1953–1978: Joseph Le Tinier
- 1978–1983: Jean-Claude Jouanno
- 1983–1984: Alain Le Corronc
- 1984–1990: Alain Jégo
- 1990–1996: Dominique Mahé
- 1996–1998: Bernard Le Claire
- 1998–2003: Dominique Mahé
- 2003–2007: Céline Le Forestier
- 2007–2011: Julien Fleury
- 2011–2014: Benoît Le Ruyet
- since 2014: Cyrille Berthou

=== The bagad ===
The main bagad, which performs under the name "Kerlenn Pondi", comprised 40 musicians in 2013, divided into four sections, each of which featured players of the same instrument (bagpipes, bombarde, snare drum, and percussion). It competes in the first category of the National Bagadoù Championship. Since 2015, it has been led by Simon Lotout.

Musically, it stands out for its specialization in the repertoire of the Vannetais region, particularly in dances from the Pontivy region (Laridé-Gavotte) and the Pourlet region (Gavotte Pourlet). The costume worn by the ensemble is that of the late 19th century, consisting of a white jacket and black trousers.

List of penn-soner (head ringer):
- 1954–1958: Abbé Raymond Le Teuf
- 1958–1960: Abbé Le Corvec
- 1960–1966: Abbé Perron
- 1966–1971: Abbé Blanchard
- 1971–1979: Abbé Corlobé
- 1979–1982: Gilbert Tanguy
- 1982–1992: Alain Le Corronc
- 1992–1998: Yannig Audran
- 1998–2008: Mikaël Jouanno
- 2008–2012: Romain Sponnagel
- 2012–2014: Vincent Fleury
- since 2015: Simon Lotout

=== The Celtic Circle ===
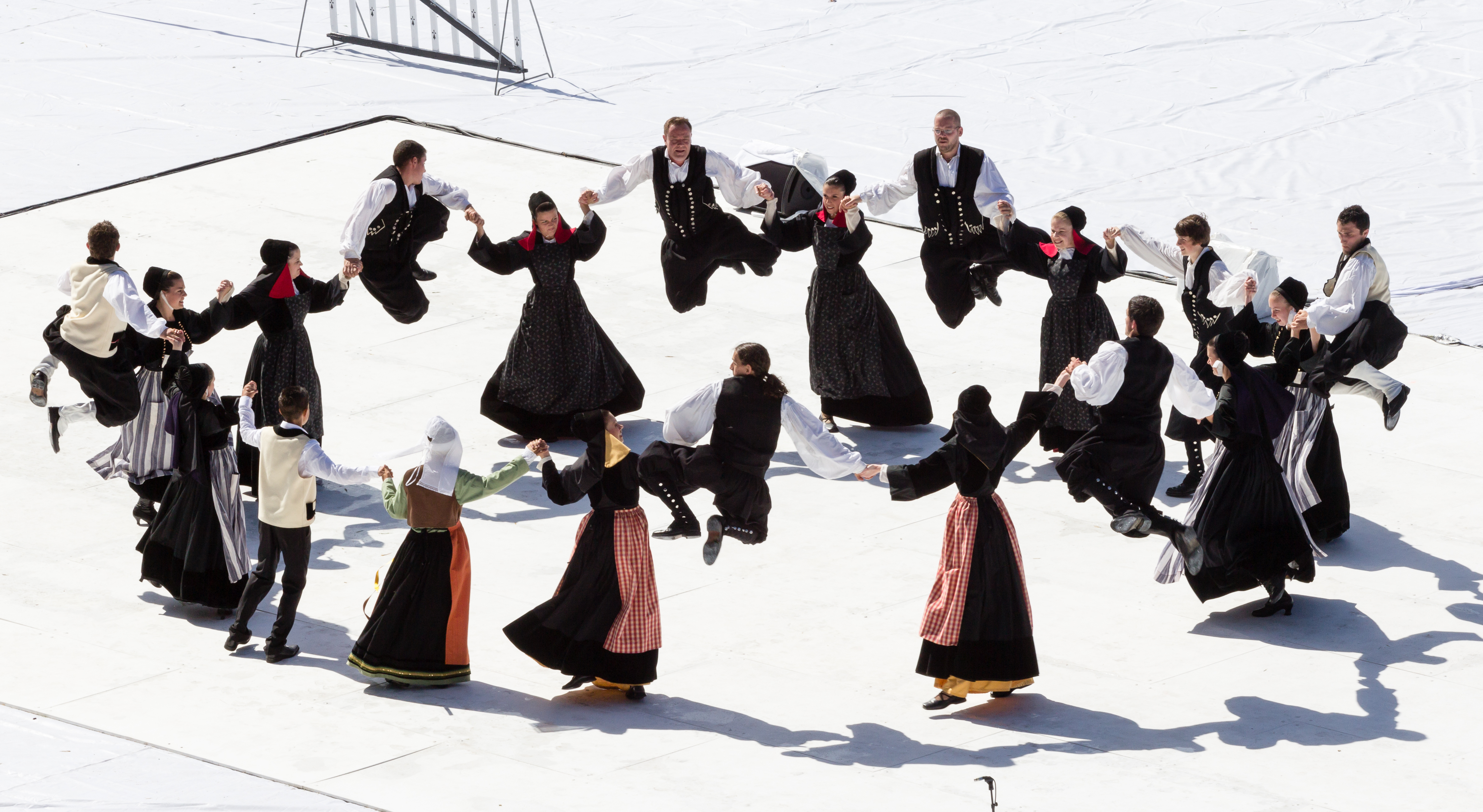
The group wearing different costumes.

The Cercle Celtique had 30 dancers in 2013 and in 2015 was in the second category of the competitions organized by Kendalc'h.

The Kerlenn dance group uses several types of costumes, all from the Pontivy region. There are two types of costumes for men. The oldest, worn in the 19th century, consists of an embroidered black jacket with numerous buttons, bragoù braz reaching below the knees, and a large hat. The second, dating from the late 19th century, is made up of a white jacket, pants, and a "guide" hat. Women's costumes follow the same chronology. The nineteenth-century costume consists of a brightly-colored dress (black towards the end of the century) with a long pleated skirt and two blouses. The headpiece is a long, winged cap or a black hood. The post-war costume features a shorter, lighter dress, trimmed with velvet bands and an embroidered apron with colorful accents. Headgear was either a cap covered with embroidery or a hood identical to that of the nineteenth century.

=== Other groups ===
In dance training, 30 children were enrolled in the Cercle Ecole and a further 80 in the Danse Loisir program in 2013.

Musical training is provided in partnership with the Conservatoire de Musique de Pontivy before musicians join the first bagad école, or bagadigan, and then the Bagadig, the antechamber to the main group. In 2013, the bagadig had 23 musicians, ranging in age from 11 to 60, and in 2014 was in the 3rd category of the National Bagadoù Championship.

A pipe band, the White Sheep Pipe Band, has also been maintained by the ensemble since 1995 and takes part in regional competitions such as the Lorient Interceltic Festival.

== Competition results ==
=== National Bagadoù Championships ===
Results at the National Bagadoù Championship
1969	1982	1983	1986	1988	1997	1999	2001	2005
1st (2nd cat)	1st (3rd cat)	1st (2nd cat)	3rd (1st cat)	1st (2nd cat)	2nd (1st cat)	2nd (1st cat)	Champion	6th (1st cat)

2006	2007	2008	2009	2010	2011	2012	2013	2014
5th (1st cat)	6th (1st cat)	5th (1st cat)	NC	9th (1st cat)	7th (1st cat)	7th (1st cat)	6th (1st cat)	7th (1st cat)

2015	2016	2017	2018	2019
6th (1st cat)	7th (1st cat)	9th (1st cat)	8th (1st cat)	3rd (1st cat)

=== Kendalc'h Dance Championship ===
1966	1991	1993	1997	2013	2014	2015	2016	2017	2018	2019
Champion	4th (1st cat)	2nd (1st cat)	2nd (1st cat)	NPP	1st (2nd)	2nd (1st cat)	1st (1st cat)	4th (Excel)	2nd (Excel)	2nd (Excel)

=== Awards ===
Kerlenn Pondi prize list
Bagadoù championship titles	Dance championship titles
National Bagadoù Championship – First category champion: 2001 – Second category champion: 1969, 1983, 1988	Kendalc'h dance championship: – First category champion: 1966

== Artistic productions ==
=== Discography ===
- 1960: Kerlenn Pondi (Mouez Breiz)
- 1972: Pontivy, musique, danse de Bretagne (MF Paris)
- 1997: Fest a gren (Coop Breizh)
- 2001: Kerlenn Pondi (Coop Breizh)
- 2011: A-gevret (Coop Breizh)

=== Filmography ===
- 2012: Safar eus Pondi da Zanzibar, documentary directed by Ronan Hirrien, about the encounter between the bagad and Safar, a taarab group, met in Cléguérec during the Bombardes & Compagnie festival.

== See also ==
- Pontivy
- Bagad
- Celtic circle
- National Bagadoù Championship

== Bibliography ==
- Morgant, Armel (2013). Kerlenn Pondi : Kalon ha begon. Coop Breizh. ISBN 978-2-84346-636-6.
- Morgant, Armel (2005). Bagad : vers une nouvelle tradition (in French). Coop Breizh. ISBN 2-84346-252-5.
