= National Bagadoù Championship =

Musical competition

Championnat National des Bagadoù
- Native name: Championnat National des Bagadoù
- English name: National Championship of Bagadoù
- Date: January 1 – December 31, 2024
- Venue: Various locations
- Location: Brittany, France; 48.1173°N 1.6778°W
- Also known as: Bagadoù Championship
- Type: Music competition
- Organised by: Sonerion
- Participants: 64 groups (1st to 4th categories)
- Awards: Best Bagad
- Website: sonerion.bzh
- Annual competition for Breton music groups.

The National Bagadoù Championship is a musical competition in which around a hundred bagadoù take part, divided into five categories. Held annually since 1949, it is divided into two rounds, at the end of which the groups are ranked and either promoted or relegated.

== Presentation ==
Since 1949, Bodadeg ar Sonerion has organized the national bagadoù championship. The championship divides the 150 bagadoùs in Brittany and elsewhere who are willing and able to participate into five categories. The categories are divided into levels, with changes of category taking place at the end of each edition. Historically, the championship is closely linked to towns like Brest and Lorient, where the first editions were held, and where the 1st category still competes. The various meetings have also been held in cities such as Quimper, Vannes, Pontivy, Concarneau, Plœmeur, Pont-l'Abbé, Carhaix, and Saint-Brieuc.

== History ==
=== Beginnings ===
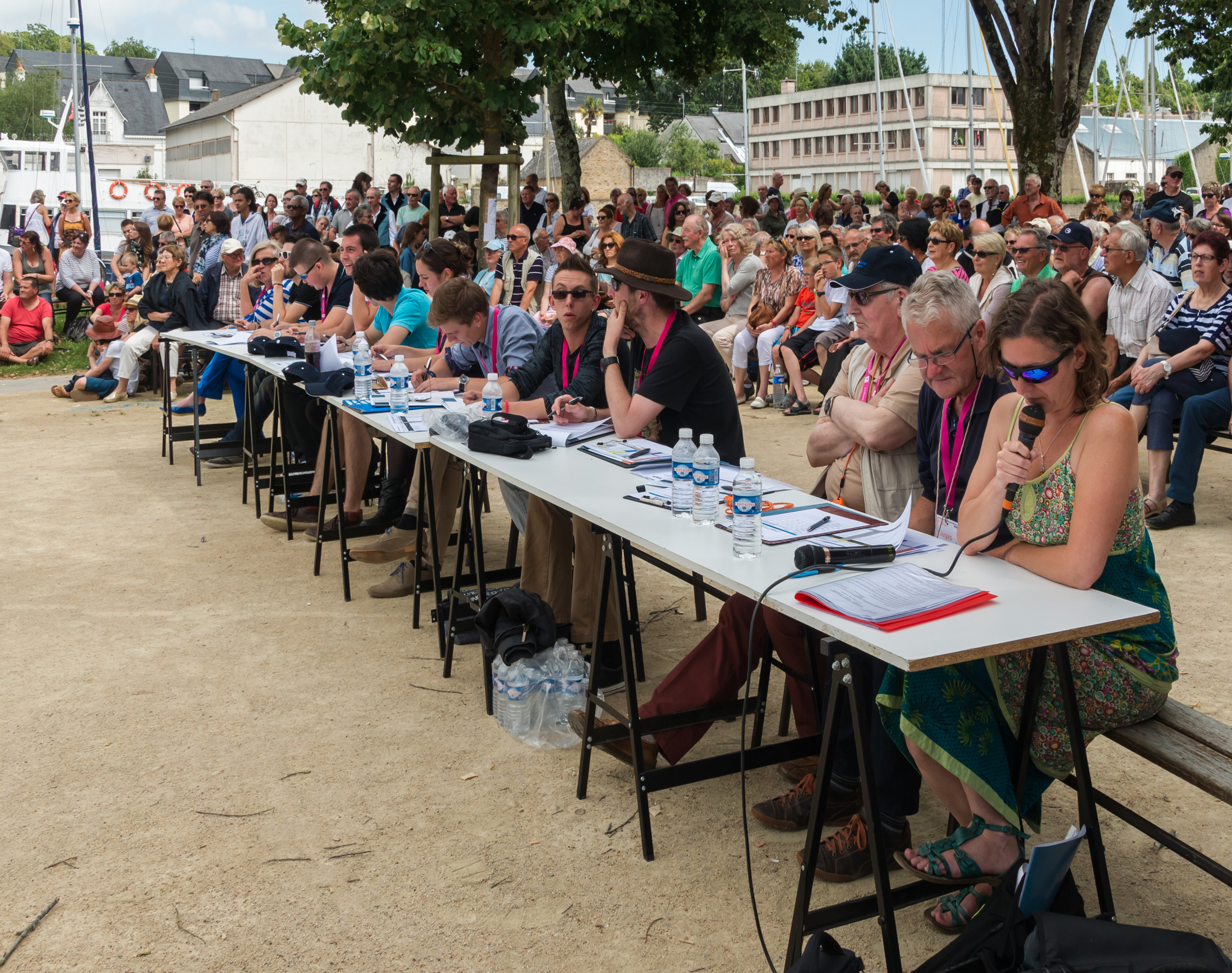
The jury, National Bagadoù Championship, 4th category A, July 12, 2014, Vannes, Morbihan.

At the end of the 1940s, following the creation of the first bagadoù, several groups were established in various Breton towns. In 1949, the first "competition for the best ringers" organized by Bodadeg ar Sonerien under the direction of Polig Monjarret included a "clique" category, which was then the name of the first bagadoùs, derived from musical cliques. Although Bodadeg ar Sonerion had 500 members at the time, only three groups took part in this first edition, where each group had to be made up of at least 6 binioù, 4 bombardes, and 2 drums.

The first championships, organized from 1949 onwards, brought together a small number of groups. Most of them were made up of traditional ringers, close to the rural culture of the time. This explains why the first groups to win titles came from small towns or rural areas. A group from Carhaix, the Kevrenn Paotred An Hent Houarn, won the first two editions in 1949 and 1950, and the Bagad Koad Serc'ho, from a village near Morlaix, won the 1953 and 1954 editions. Kevrenn de Kemperle and C'hlazig, who shared the titles in 1951 and 1952, came from larger towns but were still groups of ringing couples from the surrounding countryside.

=== The "Brest era", from 1953 to 1970 ===
During the "Brest era" of the competition, from 1953 to 1970, the dominant groups were Kevrenn de Rennes, the two Brest kevrenn (Ar Flamm and Brest Sant Mark), Bagad Boulvriag and Bagad Bleimor. The title was contested by these main groups for 17 years. The winning groups then came from larger urban centers, reflecting the changing composition of these groups; ringers followed their professional obligations and moved to bigger towns, and recruitment evolved. La Kevrenn de Rennes was the first to make its mark during this period, winning the 1955 and 1956 editions, and taking three more titles in 1963, 1967, and 1969. The group continued to make a lasting impression in the 1970s and 1980s, but was penalized by abandoning the percussion section, and subsequently failed to regain the title. Kevrenn Brest Sant Mark went on to dominate the next two decades, winning 11 titles between 1954 and 1974, including five between 1970 and 1974. The only groups to come between them were Kevrenn Brest Ar Flamm (in 1958 and 1962), Bagad Boulvriag (declared winner in 1962 before being downgraded for lack of a tenor), and Bagad Bleimor (in 1966, and sharing the title with Brest Sant Mark in 1973).

=== Quarter-century between Finistère and Morbihan ===
The following fifteen years, from 1975 to 1990, saw two new groups competing for the championship. Bagad Kemper, which moved up to the first category in 1969, won four consecutive titles from 1975 to 1979 but had to share the following titles with Kevrenn Alré, then led by an outstanding penn-sonner, Roland Becker, who won the title in 1979, 1981, 1983 and 1986. In the 1980s, however, other groups succeeded in beating this duo: Bleimor in 19807, and Bagad Bro Kemperle in 1989.

The 1990s saw the emergence of a third group, Bagad Roñsed-Mor from Locoal-Mendon, which managed to squeeze in between Kevrenn Alré and Bagad Kemper. This newcomer took the title in 1990, relegating Kemper to 2nd place Bagad Kemper only regained its title in 1991 against Kevrenn Alré, but lost the following year to Kevrenn Alré, and then again in 1993 to Roñsed-Mor, who took the title. Kemper regained the title in 1994 on points, while Roñsed-Mor won the spring event in Vannes and Kevrenn Alré the summer event in Lorient. The scenario was repeated the following year, with Roñsed-Mor winning the spring event, held for the first time at Le Quartz in Brest, and Kevrenn Alré winning the summer event, this year tied with Kemper. Kemper won the title twice during this decade in 1997 and 1998, Alré took the title in 1996 and Roñsed-Mor in 1999.

=== Recent history ===
From 2001 to 2007, the same groups shared the titles, except in 2001, when Kerlenn Pondi won, and 2007, when Bagad Brieg did likewise.

From 2008 onwards, Bagad Cap Caval dominates the championship with 7 titles (2008, 2009, 2010, 2015, 2016, 2017, 2019). The rules changed in 2003, with the introduction of a ranking system based on the "tuilage" principle: Bands in a given category with the highest scores in the winter event compete in the summer event with those in the higher category with the lowest scores. Scores from the previous six competitions are taken into account to determine whether a bagad moves up or down in another category, and the judges then score by rank. In the first category, only the top eight groups compete for the title in a category known as Maout. The system came under increasing criticism, however.

However, the system came under increasing criticism from the bands, prompting Bagad Kemper to boycott the summer event in 2009. An internal Bodadeg ar Sonerion music committee was already working on a reform of the scoring system at the time, which led to the introduction of a simplified scoring system for the 2010 edition. Each judge scores the various bagadoù between 11 and 18, and each bagad competes against the fourteen other groups in its division.

The 2020 championship was canceled due to the COVID-19 pandemic, as was the 2021 edition. In 2022, Sonerion revived the championship, which exceptionally crowned its champion over a single round, during the Festival Interceltique de Lorient. The 2023 championship returns to a two-round format.

== Media ==
Every year since 1999, Bodadeg ar Sonerion has published and sold CDs and DVDs of the 1st category competitions in Brest and Lorient.

Since 2010, these same two competitions have been broadcast live on the France 3 television channel with the help of the An Tour Tan association. Since 2017, a summary of the Brest 1st category competition has been broadcast on France 3 Bretagne as part of the Bali Breizh program.

== How it works ==
=== Rules ===
The competitions rank bagadoù in five categories, with the best groups in the 1st category. The championship is governed by a set of rules that are regularly updated by Sonerion; the following information is based on the latest revision, dated July 2010.

Map of Breton regions.

The first four categories compete twice a year:

- The first round takes place in different towns, depending on the category. The suites proposed by the bagadoù are based on geographical areas corresponding to the different countries of Brittany (also called "terroirs"), and the pieces must be taken from the musical heritage of these countries. The different terroirs are:
  - Bigouden, Bro C'hlazig, Aven, Rouzig;
  - Menezioù, Fisel, Kost ar C'hoad;
  - Pagan, Bro Leon, Plougastell, Kernevodez, Penn Sardin, Bro ar C'hap, Crozon;
  - Pourlet, Pontivy, Bro Wened
  - Trégor, Fañch, Goueloù
  - Vannetais Gallo, Mitau, Brière, Paludier
  - Loudéac, Méné, Penthièvre, Poudouvre, Clos Poulet, Coglais, Pays de Dol and bassin rennais;
  - Châteaubriant, La Mée, Sud Loire, Pays de Retz, Le Vignoble, Ancenis.
- For summer competitions, suites are free.
- For categories 1, 2, and 3, the group with the best average over the two contests is designated Brittany champion for the category. Despite this, the term champion de Bretagne is often used to designate the 1st category champion de Bretagne.
- For the 4th category, at the end of the spring competition, the groups are split into two categories (4eA and 4eB); the groups finishing first in the two summer competitions are designated champions of the categories thus created.
- Since 2010, the top two finishers in the annual rankings for the 2nd, 3rd, and 4th A categories have been promoted to higher categories, while the bottom two finishers in the 1st, 2nd, and 3rd categories have been promoted to lower categories.

In the 5th category, the groups meet once a year, and the day is divided into two parts if necessary: the qualifiers (two or three pools) and the final (the top finishers in each pool). The top two finishers in the final are eligible to compete in the 4th category the following year, but the jury may allow more groups if it wishes. The 5th category has no limit to the number of bagadoù registered and participating.

=== Performance venues ===
Cities hosting one or more events in 2024.

Venues and dates for spring competitions in 2024:

- 1st: Le Quartz (Brest), February 25, 2024.
- 2nd: L'Hermione (Saint-Brieuc), March 24, 2024.
- 3rd: Palais des Arts (Vannes), March 3, 2024.
- 4th: Palais des Congrès (Pontivy), February 11, 2024.

Places and dates of summer competitions in 2024:

- 1st, 2nd and 4th B: Festival interceltique de Lorient, August 10, 2024.
- 3rd: Festival de Cornouaille / Gouelioù Meur Kerne in Quimper, July 20, 2024.
- 4thA: Festival Folklores du monde in Saint-Malo, July 6, 2024.
- 5th category: Festival des Brodeuses in Pont-l'Abbé, July 6, 2024.

== Awards and rankings ==
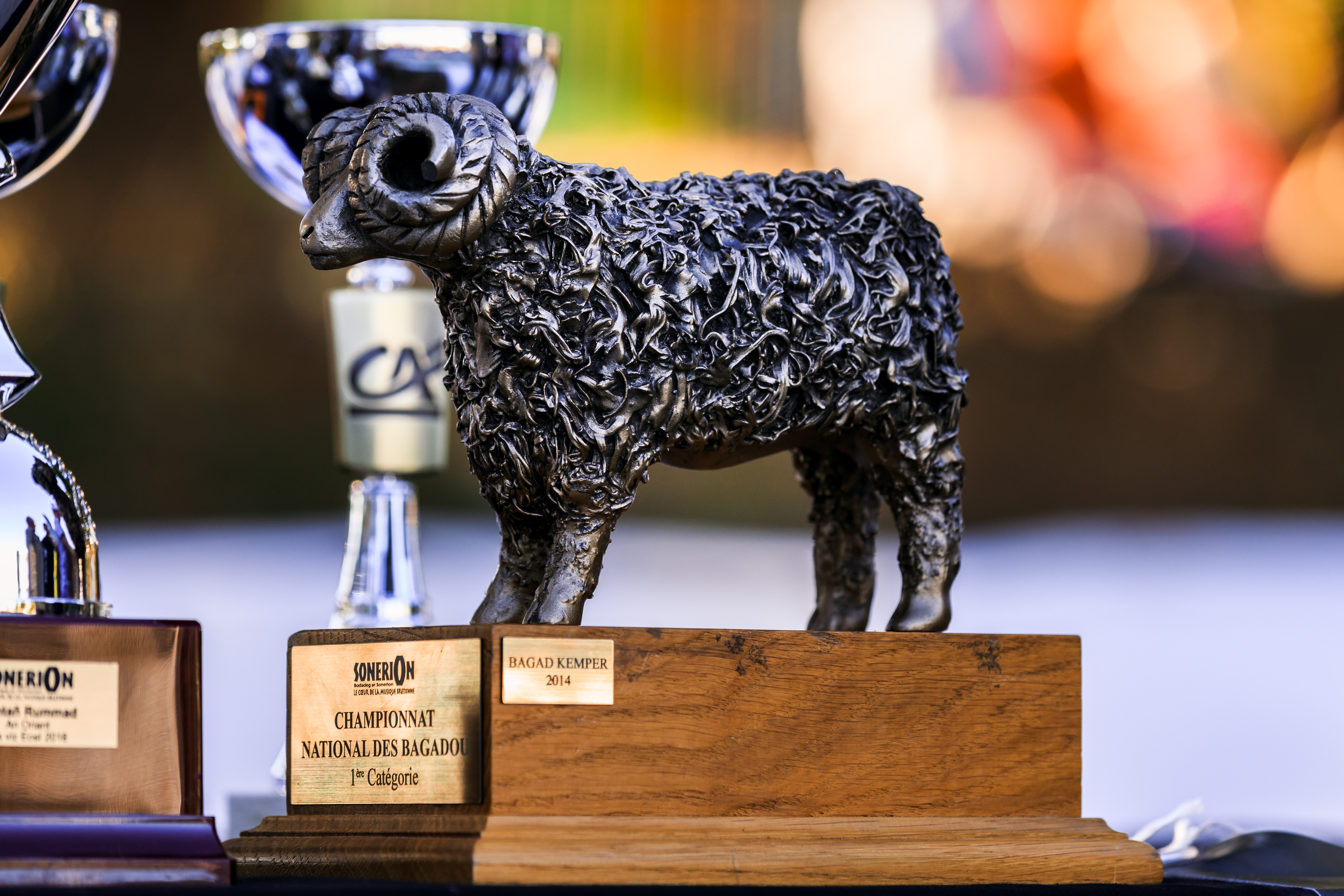
The maout offered to the 1st category champion.

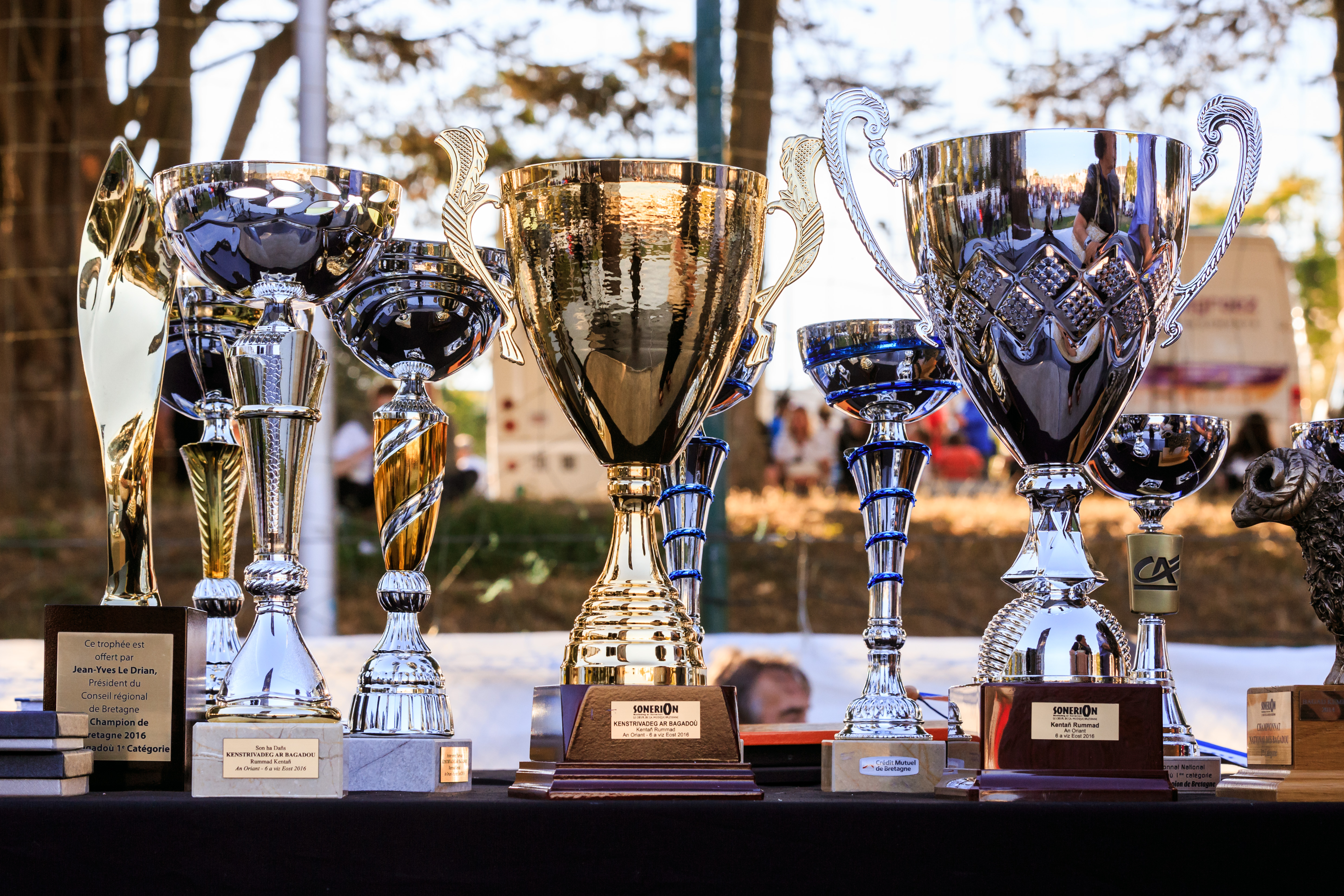
1st and 2nd category trophies.

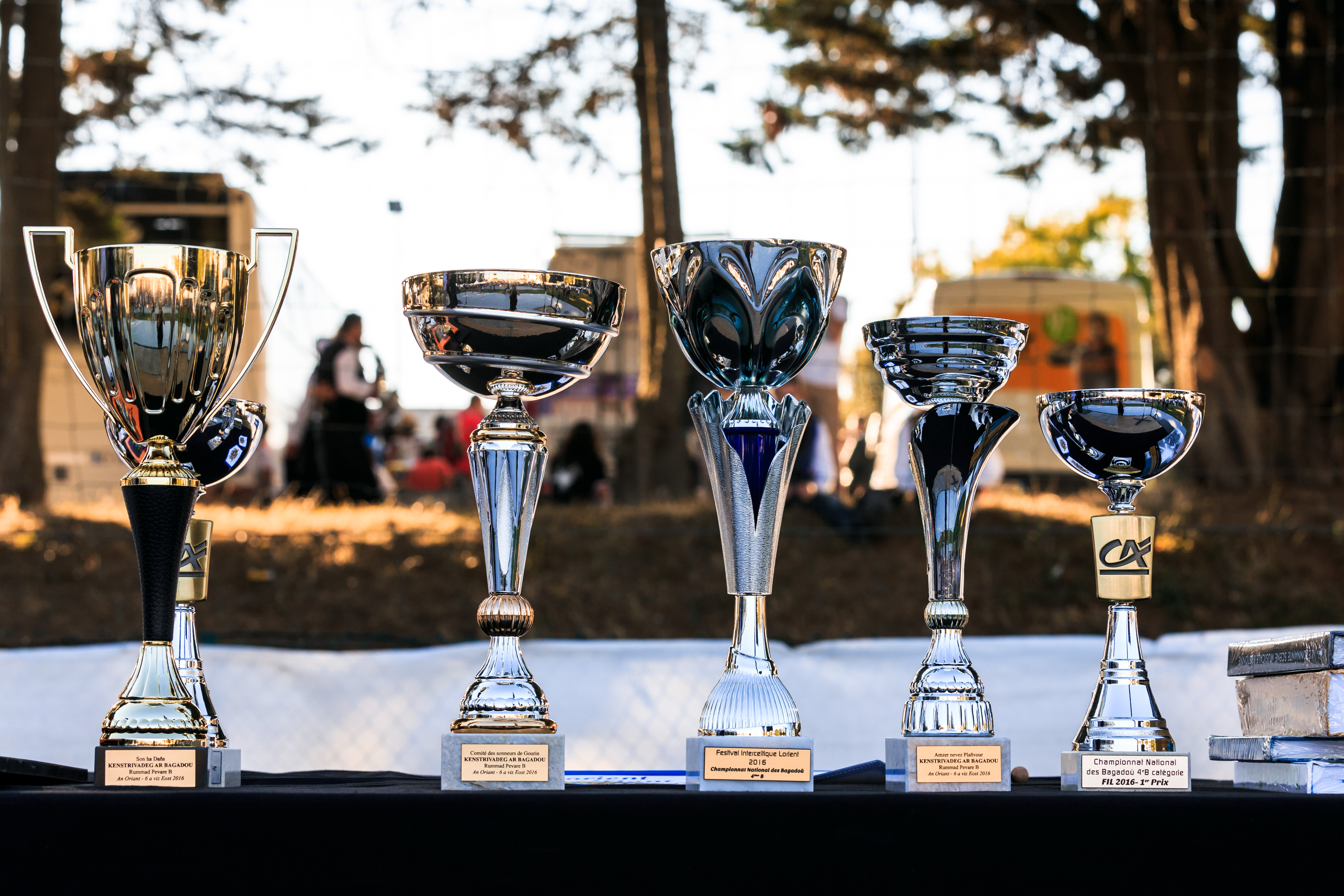
4th category trophies for group B.

=== Winning bands ===
Number of title(s)	Group
23	Kevrenn C'hlazig then Bagad Kemper (Quimper)
11	Kevrenn Brest Sant Mark (Brest)
10	Bagad Cap Caval (Plomeur)
8	Kevrenn Alre (Auray)
5	Kevrenn de Rennes (Rennes)
4	Bagad Roñsed-Mor (Locoal-Mendon); Bagad Bleimor (Paris, Lorient, Langonnet, Douarnenez)
2	Bagad Bro Kemperle (Quimperlé); Kevrenn Brest Ar Flamm (Brest); Bagad Koad Serc'ho (Morlaix); Kevrenn Paotred an Hent Houarn (Carhaix)
1	Kerlenn Pondi (Pontivy); Bagad Brieg (Briec); Bagad Boulvriag (Bourbriac - downgraded in 1962)

=== History ===
1st category champions since 1949
1949	1950	1951	1952	1953	1954
Kevrenn Paotred An Hent Houarn	Kevrenn Paotred An Hent Houarn	Kevrenn C'hlazig et Kevrenn Kemperle	Kevrenn C'hlazig	Bagad Koad Serc'ho	Bagad Koad Serc'ho

1955	1956	1957	1958	1959	1960
Kevrenn de Rennes	Kevrenn de Rennes	Kevrenn Brest Sant Mark	Bagad Brest Ar Flamm	Kevrenn Brest Sant Mark	Kevrenn Brest Sant Mark

1961	1962	1963	1964	1966	1967
Kevrenn Brest Sant Mark	Bagad Brest Ar Flamm (Bagad Boulvriag déclassé)	Kevrenn de Rennes	Kevrenn Brest Sant Mark	Bagad Bleimor	Bagad Kadoudal - Rennes

1968	1969	1970	1971	1972	1973
Kevrenn Brest Sant Mark	Bagad Kadoudal - Rennes	Kevrenn Brest Sant Mark	Kevrenn Brest Sant Mark	Kevrenn Brest Sant Mark	Kevrenn Brest Sant Mark et Bagad Bleimor

1974	1975	1976	1977	1978	1979
Kevrenn Brest Sant Mark	Bagad Kemper	Bagad Kemper	Bagad Kemper	Bagad Kemper	Kevrenn Alre

1980	1981	1982	1983	1984	1985
Bagad Bleimor	Kevrenn Alre	Bagad Kemper	Kevrenn Alre	Bagad Kemper	Bagad Kemper

1986	1987	1988	1989	1990	1991
Kevrenn Alre	Bagad Bleimor	Bagad Kemper	Bagad Bro Kemperlé	Bagad Roñsed-Mor	Bagad Kemper

1992	1993	1994	1995	1996	1997
Kevrenn Alre	Bagad Roñsed-Mor	Bagad Kemper	Bagad Kemper	Kevrenn Alre	Bagad Kemper

1998	1999	2000	2001	2002	2003
Bagad Kemper	Bagad Roñsed-Mor	Bagad Kemper	Kerlenn Pondi	Bagad Kemper	Bagad Roñsed-Mor

2004	2005	2006	2007	2008	2009
Bagad Kemper	Kevrenn Alre	Kevrenn Alre	Bagad Brieg	Bagad Cap Caval	Bagad Cap Caval

2010	2011	2012	2013	2014	2015
Bagad Cap Caval	Bagad Kemper	Bagad Kemper	Bagad Kemper	Bagad Kemper	Bagad Cap Caval

2016	2017	2018	2019	2020	2021
Bagad Cap Caval	Bagad Cap Caval	Bagad Cap Caval	Bagad Cap Caval	Canceled	Canceled

2022	2023	2024
Bagad Kemper	Bagad Cap Caval	Bagad Cap Caval

== See also ==
- Bagad
- Kerlenn Pondi

== Bibliography ==
- Morgant, Armel; Roignant, Jean-Michel (2005). "Le monde des concours : le championnat national des bagadoù" [The world of competitions: the national bagadoù championship]. Bagad : vers une nouvelle tradition [Bagad: towards a new tradition] (in French). Spézet: Coop Breizh. p. 61-89. ISBN 2-84346-252-5.
- Classe, Gérard (2000). Bagad Kemper, 50 ans sans relâche, hep diskrog [Bagad Kemper, 50 years without stopping, hep diskrog] (in French). Blanc Silex. ISBN 2-913969-10-0.
- "Les coulisses du championnat des bagadoù" [Behind the scenes of the bagadoù championship]. Bretons (in French). 97. 2014.
