= Jacques Gabriel =

French architect (1667–1742)

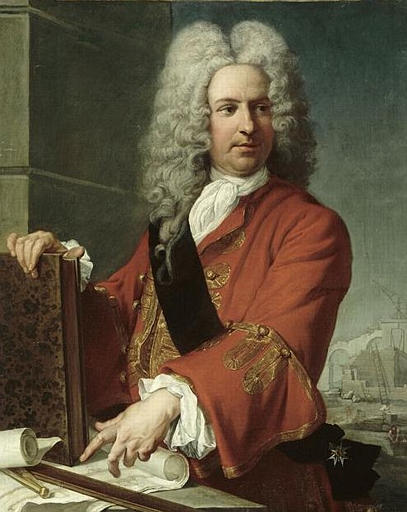
- Born: 1667
- Died: 23 April 1742 (aged 74–75)
- Occupation: Architect
- Children: Ange-Jacques Gabriel
- Parent: Jacques Gabriel

Jacques Gabriel (1667 – 23 April 1742) was a French architect, the father of the famous Ange-Jacques Gabriel. Jacques Gabriel was a designer, painter and architect of the 17th and 18th centuries and one of the most prominent designers of the Palace of Versailles in his lifetime. For his unique creativity and selflessness, he was always attended by Louis XIV and eventually became a trusted advisor to the monarch. He made important contributions to him during his years of service of which the construction of the Palace of Versailles was the most important.

He had a mission to build the palace throughout his life and was also the first designer of the bridges in Paris. Gabriel's son Ange-Jacques Gabriel continued his father's journey and in this regard, like his father, completed the Palace of Versailles in reign of Louis XV.

== Biography ==
His mother was a cousin of Jules Hardouin-Mansart and his father, also named Jacques Gabriel, was a masonry contractor for the Bâtiments du Roi, the French royal works, and the designer of the Château de Choisy for the king's cousin, Anne D'Orléans.

The younger Jacques Gabriel was appointed one of the controlleurs généraux at the Bâtiments du Roi in 1688, at the age of 21. Two years later he was sent to accompany Robert de Cotte on an eighteen-month sojourn in Italy, sharpening his eye, and on his return was made one of the Autres Architectes in the Bâtiments du Roi, where he proved an efficient administrator. He was made a member of the Académie royale d'architecture at Mansart's reorganization of that body in 1699.

Pierre-Jean Mariette, who knew him well says that he was "expert in the conduct of building, but he could not have drawn the least jot of ornament". ^{a} For designers of ornament, Gabriel relied on Pierre Lepautre and after Lepautre's death, on Jean Aubert, another designer trained in the Bâtiments du Roi.

Gabriel succeeded Robert de Cotte as Premier Architecte du Roi of de Cotte's retirement in December 1734 and held the post until he was succeeded by his "vastly more gifted" son, Ange-Jacques Gabriel in 1742.

Gabriel's work in Paris has been much remodelled. Pierre-Jean Mariette's Architecture françoise offers plates illustrating several hôtels particuliers by Gabriel. He completed the Palais Bourbon (begun by Giardini, continued by Pierre Cailleteau Lassurance). He completed the Hôtel de Lassay nearby. He was responsible for the Hôtel Peyrenc de Moras (de Biron), 1728–31.

== Notes ==
^a "Il étoit expert dans la conduite du bâtiment, mais il n'auroit pas pu dessiner le moindre bout d'ornement"; (in French).

== See also ==
- Gabriel Hotel
