= Kevrenn Alre =

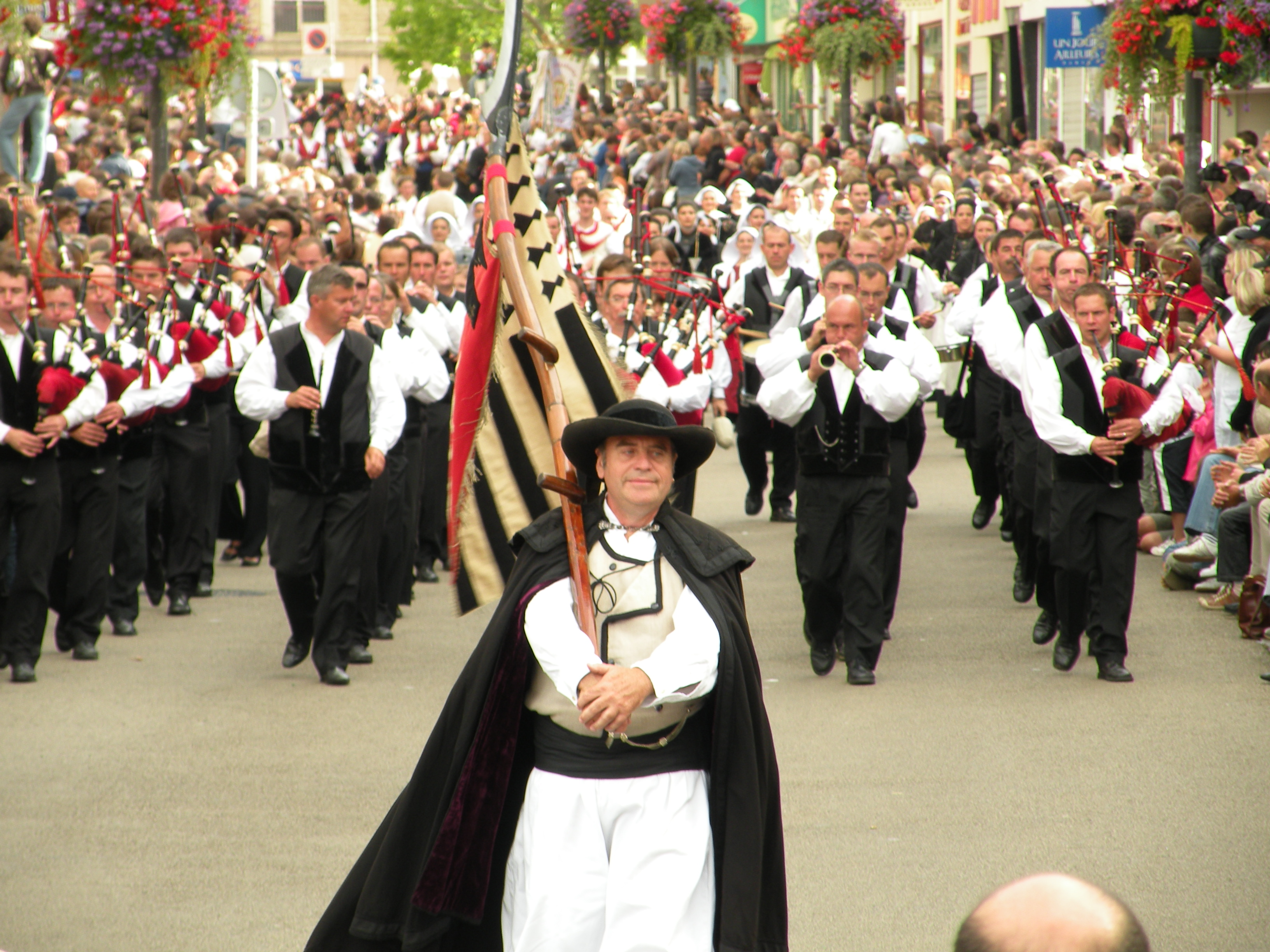
The Kevrenn Alre during the Festival interceltique de Lorient 2009

Kevrenn Alre ("Bagad and Celtic Circle of Auray" in Breton language) is a group of music and dance of Breton traditional inspiration, created in 1951, by railroad employees of the marshalling yard of Auray (Morbihan, Brittany).

Eight times national champion of bagadou and ten times national champion of Breton dance, Kevrenn Alre takes place in an avant-gardist position of a Breton cultural movement (Bagad, Celtic circle, show / concert) and scenic creations combining modernism, musical fusions and dances. The musicians, workers with a union which makes their strength, built up to themselves a style, a sonority jazz with the addition of a writing desk clarinet stemming from the music school, and the working habits, as the week of repetition before Lorient competition.

Training is since its inception in relation to Celtic nations, in his music and in his travels. It has also proven export opportunities abroad, becoming ambassador of music and culture in Europe and in the world, with trips to countries such have Yugoslavia in 1962, the United States in 1989 and 2007 (invited by the Irish band The Chieftains on stage at Carnegie Hall) and China in 2008.

== Honours ==
=== National Bagadoù Championship ===
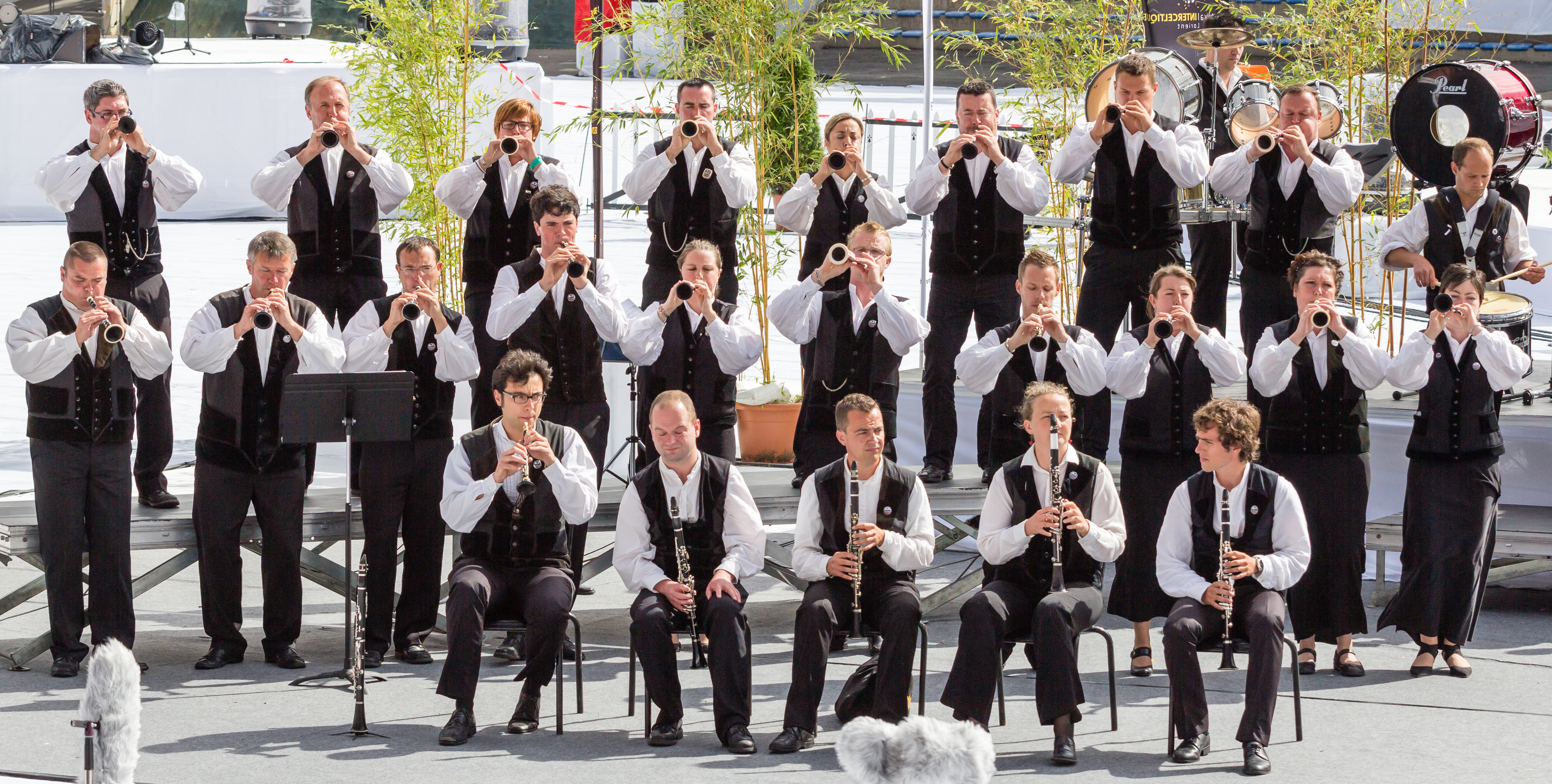
Bombards and clarinets in Lorient contest in 2012

Kevrenn Alre played in the first class. The third most successful training history, Kevrenn Alre was crowned eight-time champion of Brittany: 1979, 1981, 1983, 1986, 1992, 1996, 2005 and 2006. Kevrenn Alre is vice-champion in 2007, 2008 and 2009 and finished many years in third place (2011, 2012...).

=== National Breton dance Championship ===
Kevrenn Alré is classified as category "Excellence" by Kendalc'h confederation. It won ten league titles in Brittany Championship: from 1986 to 1992 and again in 1996, 1997 and 1999.

== Discography ==
- 1988 : Musique, chants et danses
- 1990 : Kevrenn Alré
- 1997 La.ri.don.gé!
- 2001 50 ans
- 2006 : Dañs Ar Bleiz (2CD)
- 2008 : Alre en Iliz (CD/DVD)

=== Participations ===
- 1984 : Bodadeg ar Sonerion : daou ugent vloaz e servij sonerezh Breizh ("Assembly of ringers: 40 years in the service of Breton music")
- 2003 : A toi et ceux – Dan Ar Braz
- 2006 : Bagad ! Une légende bretonne ("Bagad! A Breton legend" CD/DVD)
- 2006 : Phénomène Bagad – Barbara Froger (DVD)
- 2006 : Celtica (DVD) shows in Nantes
- 2007 : Nuit de la Saint Patrick in Paris-Bercy
- 2007 : Nuit Interceltique de Rennes (DVD)
