= Bagad Cap Caval =

French bagad

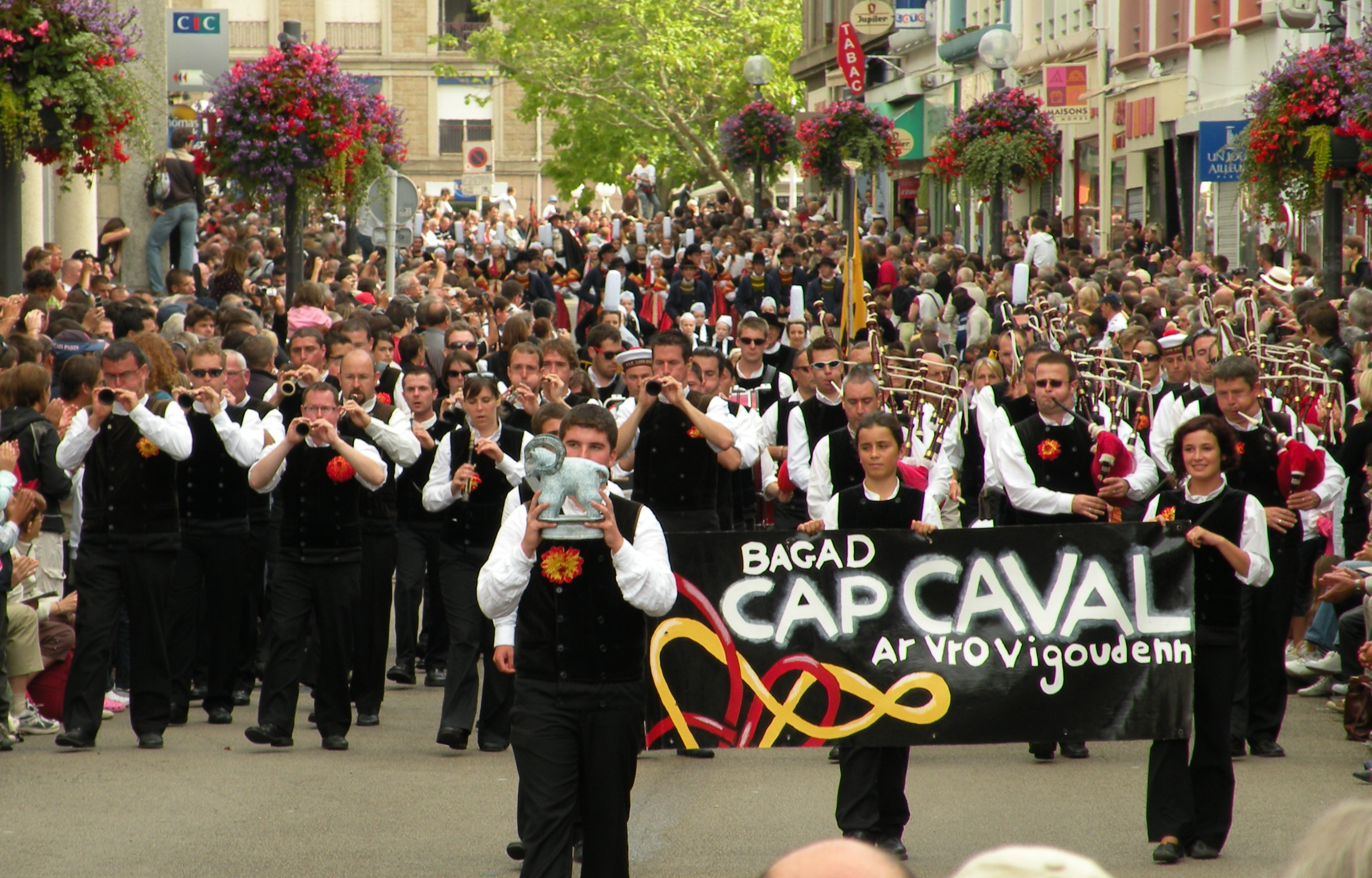
- Bagad Cap Caval in Festival interceltique de Lorient 2009
- Established: 1984
- Location: Plomeur, Brittany
- Grade: 2
- Website: capcaval.com

Bagad Cap Caval is a bagad located in the Bigouden area (which has historically been known as Cap Caval), started in Plomeur in 1984.

The association has two bagad schools and a pipe band. The band won the World Pipe Band Championships in Grade 2 in 2008.

Bagad Cap Caval was promoted to the first class of bagadoù championship in 1995. Since 2002, it is ranked in the top five in the first category and was champion of Brittany in 2008, 2009, 2010, 2015, 2016 and 2023.

== Productions ==
=== Stage creations ===
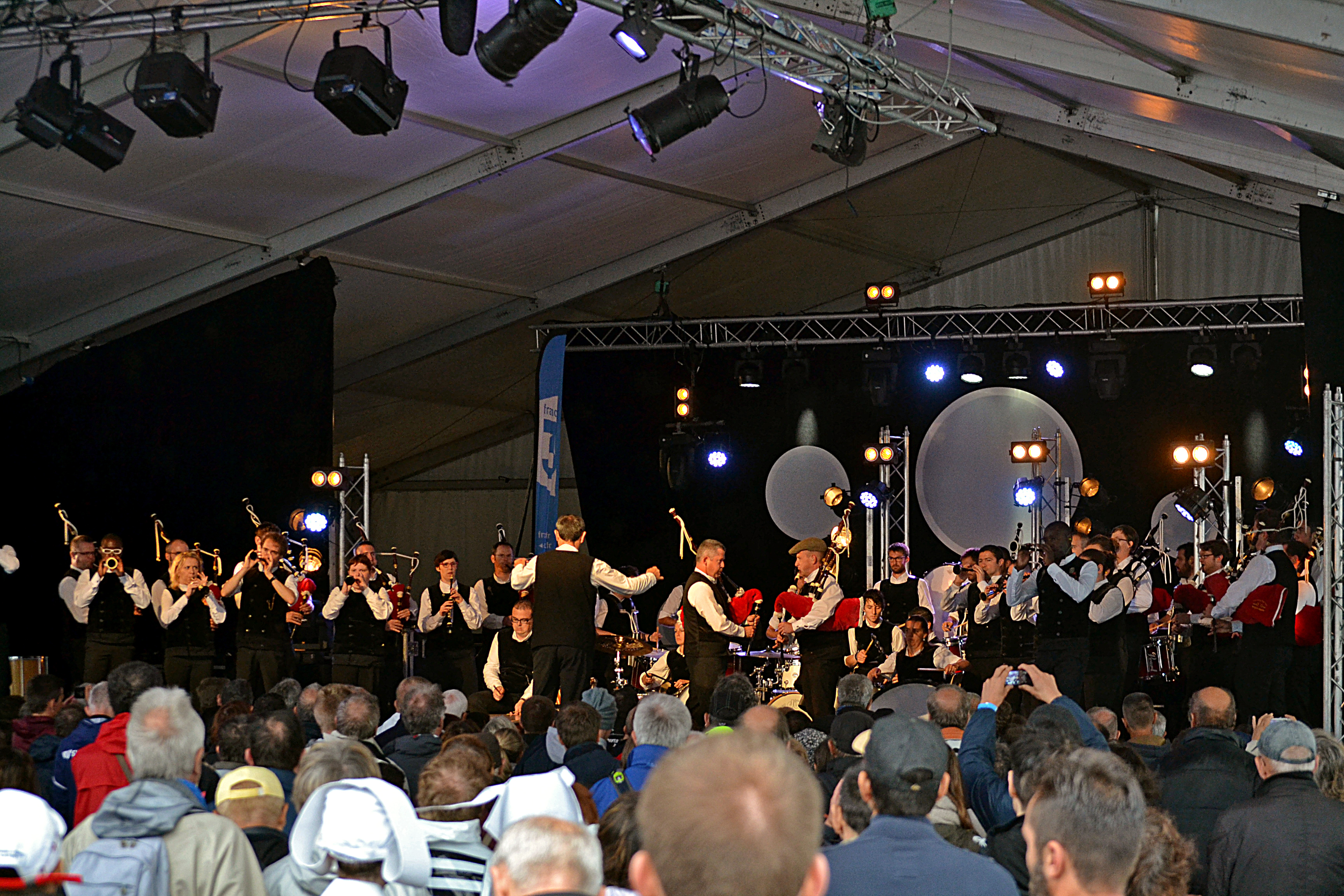
On stage in Festival de Cornouaille in 2015.

- Hepken (2003, nine performances)
- Héritage d’une culture (in Festival de Cornouaille, two performances)
- Spered (in Festival de Cornouaille)
- Ijin (Imagine, 2006-2008)
- Ololé (2009-2010)
- Lioù Tan (Fire Colors, 2011-2012)
- Beo (Living, 2013)
- Tan De'i (Let's Go!, 2014)

==== Performance venues ====
- Germany (1992), Hungary (1995), Canada (Prince Edward Island in 2011)
- United Kingdom: Isle of Man (1991), Wales (Saint-David in 2011)
- Scotland: Piping Live! Festival (Glasgow), Celtic Connections (Glasgow Royal Concert Hall en 2009)
- Republic of Ireland and Northern Ireland (crossing Roscoff-Cork), William Kennedy Piping Festival (Armagh in 2008)
- Italy: Festival Celtica (Val Veny), Busto Folk (Milan)
- Spain: Gijón (Galicia in 2011)
- France: les Polymusicales (Avignon), les Estivales (La Rochelle), opening 1998 FIFA World Cup (Saint-Denis), Saint Patrick's Day (in Clermont-Ferrand)
- Brittany: Festival Interceltique de Lorient, Festival de Cornouaille (Quimper), Douarnenez, Gourin, Fête des brodeuses (Pont-l’Abbé), Le Quartz (Brest), Festival Yaouank (Rennes)

=== Discography ===
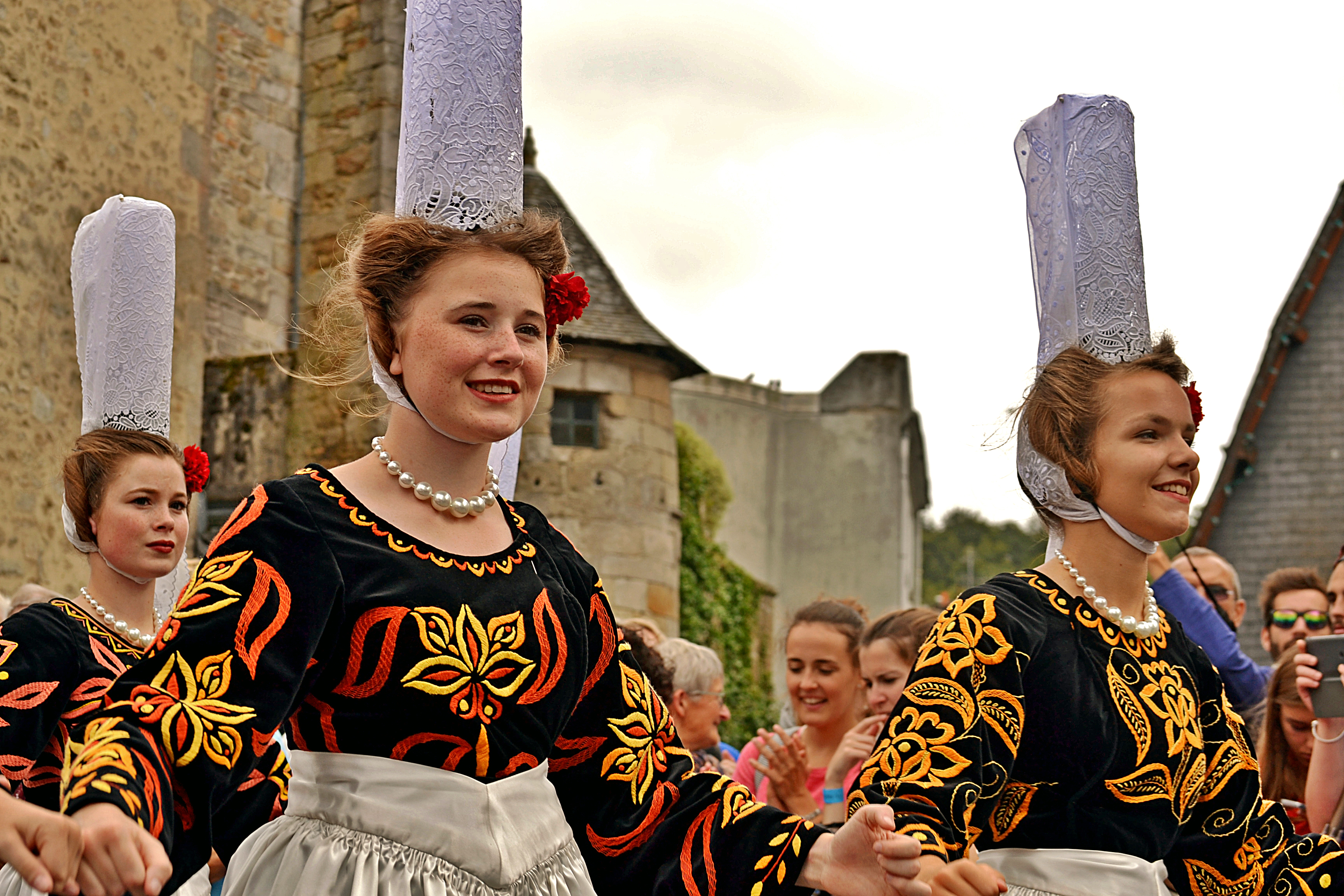
Celtic circle Ar Vro Vigoudenn

- 1996: Bagad Cap Caval (Declic Communication/Sony Music)
- 2002: Brezhoneg 'Raok (Coop Breizh)
- 2004: Hepken Live (Coop Breizh)
- 2006: Ijin (DVD, Coop Breizh) with Celtic circle dance group Ar Vro Vigoudenn
- 2008: Ololé! (CD/DVD, Coop Breizh)
- 2011: Lioù Tan (Coop Breizh)
- 2011: Enregistrement Live en Pays Bigouden with Taÿfa (Coop Breizh)
- 2014: Beo! (Coop Breizh)
- 2016: Tan De'i ! (Coop Breizh)
- 2020: Stil (Coop Breizh)
