= Culture of Brittany =

Cultural practices associated with Brittany, France

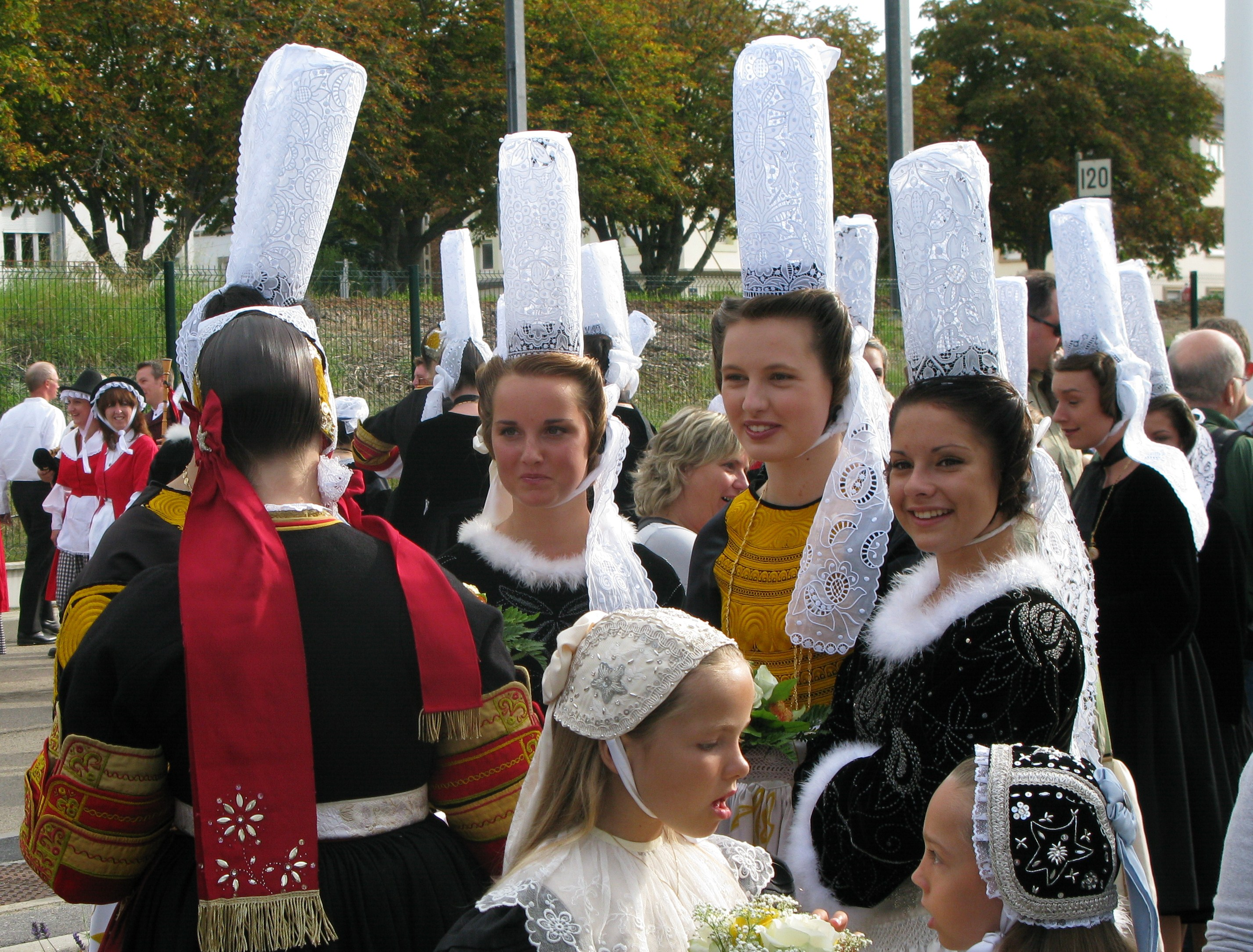
A group of bigoudènes wearing the distinctive Bigouden headdress.

The culture of Brittany encompasses the traditions, arts, languages, and values associated with the historical region of Brittany in northwestern France and the Breton people. Breton culture draws on a dual heritage: the Celtic Brittonic traditions brought by migrants from Britain during the Early Middle Ages, and the Romance-influenced culture of eastern Brittany. These influences have produced two distinct linguistic zones and a rich body of music, dance, visual art, and folklore that persists to the present day.

Modern Brittany is considered a historical region and includes the Loire-Atlantique department. Once independent as the Duchy of Brittany, with its capital in Nantes, it became a duchy within the Kingdom of France before being integrated into France in 1491. It should not be confused with the administrative region of Brittany, which reflects the boundaries imposed by France since 1941 and excludes Loire-Atlantique.

== Language ==
The two languages traditionally spoken in Brittany are Breton, a Celtic language, and Gallo, a Romance language of the Langues d'oïl group. Historically the region was divided by an imaginary linguistic boundary: Lower Brittany in the west, where Breton was dominant, and Upper Brittany in the east, where Gallo prevailed. This boundary has shifted westward over centuries under Romance influence and is generally considered to run near the commune of Ploërmel. Both languages have declined sharply since the French Revolution, when regional languages were discouraged; today French is the predominant language of the region.

=== Breton ===
Breton is a Brittonic Celtic language, brought to Armorica by migrants from Britain during the Early Middle Ages, making it most closely related to Cornish and Welsh. It is the only Celtic language still spoken on the European mainland, and the only living Celtic language not officially recognised by any national government.

Before the First World War, more than one million people in Lower Brittany spoke Breton daily, and for most it was their only language. The language suffered severe decline after World War II, partly due to its association with wartime collaboration by some Breton nationalist groups, and partly due to sustained promotion of French in education. A survey published in January 2025 estimated 107,000 remaining speakers — down from around 200,000 in 2018 — classified as "severely endangered" by the UNESCO Atlas of the World's Languages in Danger. The speaker base is increasingly younger, however: only 16% of current speakers learned Breton at home, while 78% learned it at school, reflecting the long-term impact of the Diwan schools immersion network, founded in 1977, and bilingual state and Catholic school programmes established in the late 1970s and 1990s.

=== Gallo ===
Gallo is a Romance language of the Langues d'oïl group, spoken primarily in Upper Brittany. A 2025 survey estimated approximately 132,000 speakers. In 2004 both Breton and Gallo were officially recognised as "languages of Brittany" by the Regional Council of Brittany. Like Breton, Gallo is considered endangered by UNESCO.

== Symbols and flag ==
=== Gwenn-ha-Du ===
Gwenn-ha-du

The Flag of Brittany, known as the Gwenn-ha-du (Breton for "White and black"), is the principal emblem of Brittany. It was designed in 1923 by Morvan Marchal, a Breton architect and nationalist activist, drawing inspiration from the flag of the United States as a symbol of freedom and self-determination. Its nine horizontal black and white stripes represent Brittany's nine traditional dioceses: the five black stripes correspond to the historically French/Gallo-speaking dioceses of Dol, Nantes, Rennes, Saint-Malo and Saint-Brieuc, and the four white stripes to the Breton-speaking dioceses of Léon, Cornouaille, Vannes and Trégor. The ermine canton in the upper left recalls the arms of the Duchy of Brittany.

The flag's association with Breton nationalist and collaborationist movements during World War II brought it into disrepute for several decades. It was revived in popular usage from the 1960s onwards, becoming a broadly recognised cultural symbol detached from political connotations.

== Music ==
Breton music encompasses a wide range of vocal and instrumental traditions rooted in the region's Celtic and maritime heritage. The main traditional instruments are the bombarde (a double-reed shawm) and the biniou kozh (a small Breton bagpipe), which are typically played as a pair. Other traditional instruments include the Celtic harp, diatonic accordion, and fiddle. The bagad (pipe band), a more recently established ensemble inspired partly by Scottish pipe bands, combines the Great Highland bagpipe (binioù bras), bombarde, and drums; the bagad format was developed after Breton soldiers encountered Scottish pipe bands during World War II.

A major form of Breton vocal music is kan ha diskan ("call and response singing"), typically performed without accompaniment to drive chain dances at fest-noz gatherings.

The modern Breton music revival was sparked in large part by Alan Stivell, a Celtic harpist and singer who from the early 1970s blended traditional Breton and Celtic music with rock, folk and world music influences. His 1972 live album À l'Olympia sold over 1.5 million copies and brought Breton music to international attention. The concert was broadcast live on Europe 1 radio to an audience of seven million listeners. Other prominent artists include Tri Yann, Gilles Servat, Dan Ar Braz, and Denez Prigent, as well as contemporary bands such as Matmatah and Manau who have fused Breton themes with rock and hip-hop.

=== Fest-noz ===
The fest noz (Breton: "night festival") is a communal gathering built around the collective practice of traditional Breton dances accompanied by live singing or instrumental music. On 5 December 2012, the fest-noz was inscribed on UNESCO's Representative List of the Intangible Cultural Heritage of Humanity, recognising it as a living practice characterised by intergenerational participation, musical diversity and social cohesion. Around a thousand fest-noz events take place every year across Brittany, drawing audiences of hundreds to several thousand people. Common dances include the an dro, hanter dro, gavotte and plinn, most performed in chains or circles with participants linking hands.

=== Festival Interceltique de Lorient ===
Founded in 1971 by Polig Monjarret, the Festival Interceltique de Lorient is an annual ten-day event held each August in Lorient, dedicated to the cultural traditions of the Celtic nations. Participants come from Brittany, Ireland, Wales, Scotland, Cornwall, Galicia, Asturias, and the broader Celtic diaspora. It has grown into one of the largest Celtic festivals in the world, attracting nearly 950,000 visitors in 2023 across around 300 shows on 12 stages, with over 4,500 artists.

== Costume and traditional dress ==
Traditional Breton dress varies by locality and historically represented regional or parish identity. Costumes are today worn primarily at festivals, pardons and cultural events rather than in daily life. Among the most recognisable features are the bigouden headdresses of the Pays Bigouden in southern Finistère, tall lace coiffes worn by women that evolved in height dramatically during the 19th and early 20th centuries.

== Traditions ==
=== Pardons ===
Pardons are religious pilgrimages and processions, held in honour of local patron saints, during which participants seek absolution. They represent one of the most distinctive traditions of Breton Catholicism and continue to be observed across the region, combining religious ceremony with the wearing of traditional costumes.

== Festivals ==
- Fest noz
- Festival Interceltique de Lorient
- Kalan Goañv (the Breton equivalent of Halloween)

== See also ==
- Brittany
- Breton people
- Breton nationalism
- Breton Americans
- Reunification of Brittany
- Celtic Nations
- Modern Celtic cultures
- Culture of Cornwall
- Culture of Wales
- Culture of France
- Music of Brittany
- Breton language
