= Bagad =

Type of musical group in Brittany

- Stylistic origins: Music of Brittany; Pipe band
- Cultural origins: Brittany

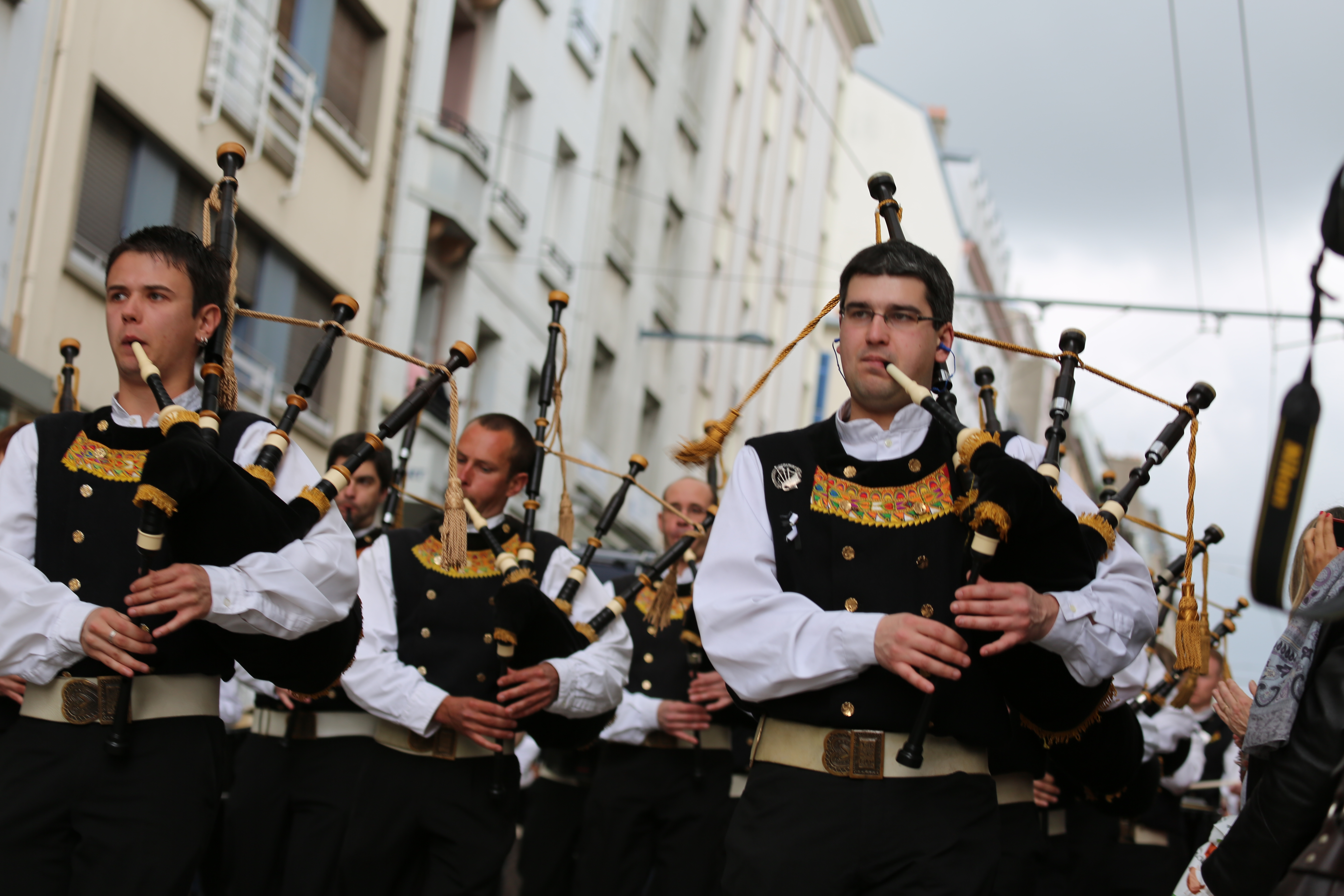
Bagad ar Meilhoù Glaz from Quimper.

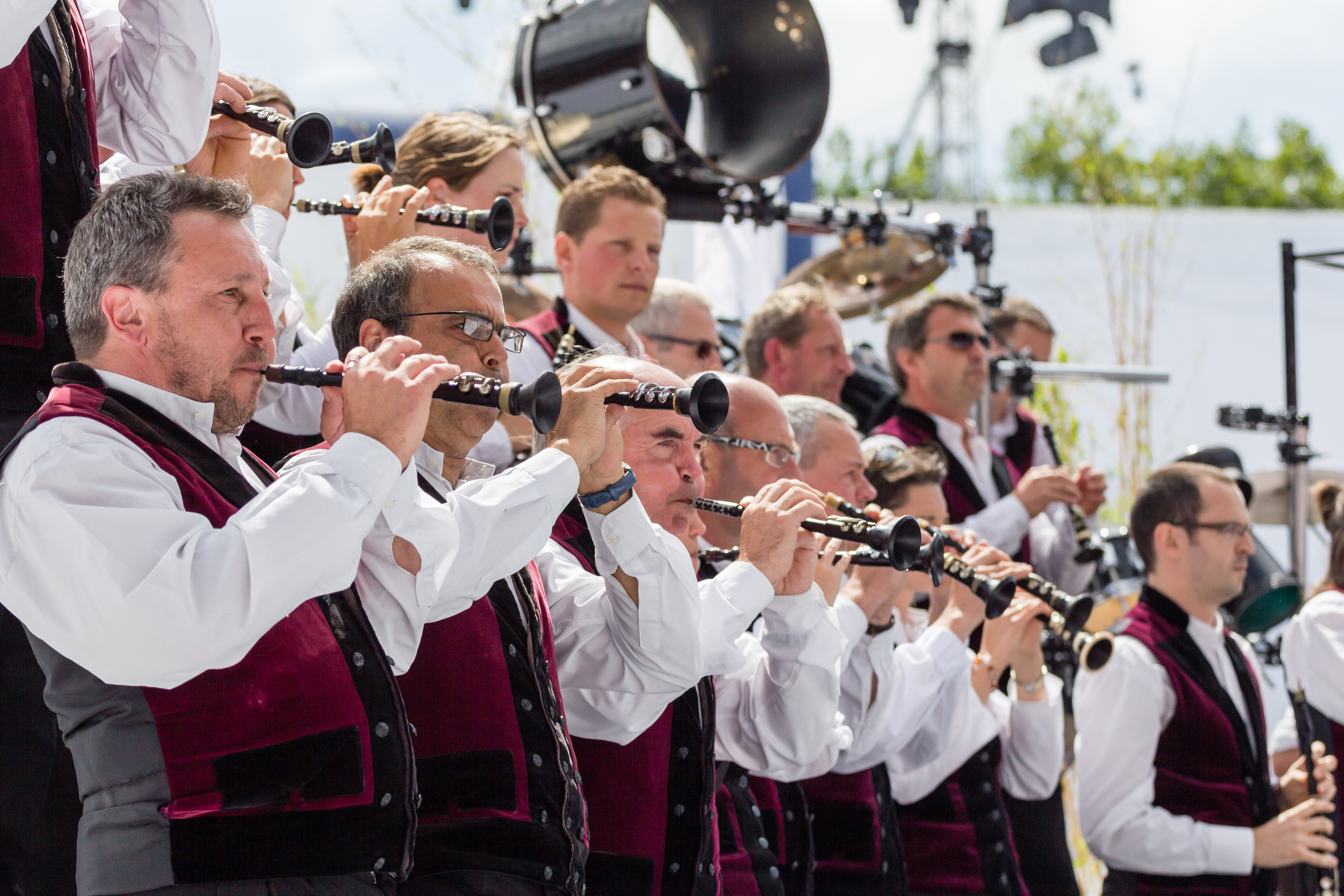
Bombard players from Bagad Ronsed-Mor.

A bagad (Breton pronunciation: [ˈbɑːɡat], French: [baɡad]) is a Breton band, composed of bagpipes (Breton: binioù, French: cornemuse), bombards and drums (including snare, tenor and bass drums). The pipe band tradition in Brittany was inspired by the Scottish example and has developed since the mid-20th century. A bagad plays mainly Breton music, but a bagad's music is evolutionary: new forms and musical ideas are experimented with at each annual national competition.

The plural for bagad is unusual in that many are referred to as bagadoù but for two, three or any other specified number they are simply referred to as bagad (following the rules of Breton grammar).

Every major town and city in Brittany has at least one bagad and there are over eighty in total. There are also many bagadoù outside Brittany, owing to large-scale Breton emigration throughout France. Bagad Lann Bihoue is well known to belong to the French Navy.

For competition purposes the bagadoù are ranked into five categories. Major competitions take place annually in Brest and in Lorient, where the National Championship takes place during the Interceltic Festival in August.

== Premier Category 2008 ==
Festival des filets bleus in 2015

The most successful bagadoù compete in the 'Premier Category'.

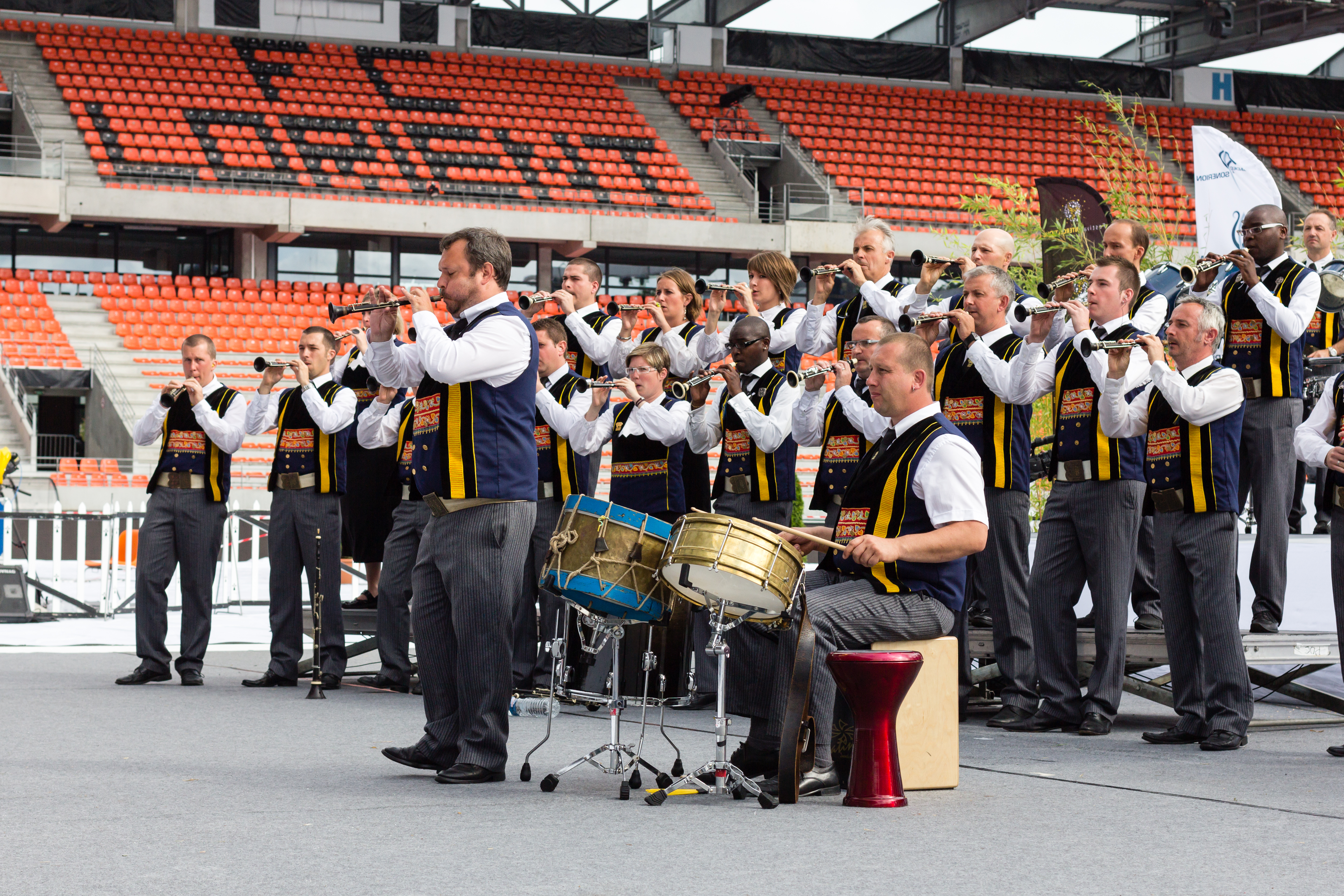
Bagad Kemper, 21 times winner of the National Bagadoù Championship during the summer competition in the Stade du Moustoir in Lorient.

- Bagad Brieg, Briec – Bagad Brieg
- Kevrenn Alre, Auray – Kevrenn Alre
- Bagad Roñsed-Mor, Locoal-Mendon – Bagad Roñsed-Mor
- Bagad Kemper, Quimper – Bagad Kemper
- Bagad Cap Caval, Plomeur – Bagad Cap Caval
- Kerlenn Pondi, Pontivy – Bagad Kerlenn Pondi
- Bagad Bro Kemperle, Quimperlé – Bagad Bro Kemperle
- Bagad Quic-en-groigne, Saint-Malo – Bagad Quic-en-Groigne
- Bagad Gwengamp, Guingamp – Bagad Gwengamp
- Bagad Sant-Nazer, Saint-Nazaire – Bagad Saint-Nazaire
- Bagad Er Melinerion, Vannes – Bagad er Melinerion
- Bagad Beuzeg ar C'hab, Beuzec-Cap-Sizun – Bagad Beuzeg ar C'hab
- Bagad Penhars, Quimper – Bagad Penhars
- Bagad Ar Meilhoù-Glaz, Quimper – Bagad Ar Meilhoù-Glaz
- Bagad Sonerien Bro Dreger, Perros-Guirec – Bagad Sonerien Bro Dreger

== National Champions ==
- 2023 Bagad Cap Caval
- 2022 Bagad Kemper
- 2021 Canceled
- 2020 Canceled
- 2019 Bagad Cap Caval
- 2018 Bagad Cap Caval
- 2017 Bagad Cap Caval
- 2016 Bagad Cap Caval
- 2015 Bagad Cap Caval
- 2014 Bagad Kemper
- 2013 Bagad Kemper
- 2012 Bagad Kemper
- 2011 Bagad Kemper
- 2010 Bagad Cap Caval
- 2009 Bagad Cap Caval
- 2008 Bagad Cap Caval
- 2007 Bagad Brieg
- 2006 Bagad Kevrenn Alré
- 2005 Bagad Kevrenn Alré
- 2004 Bagad Kemper
- 2003 Bagad Ronsed Mor
- 2002 Bagad Kemper

== See also ==
- Kerlenn Pondi
- National Bagadoù Championship
