= Wickham Festival =

Multi-day performance event in England

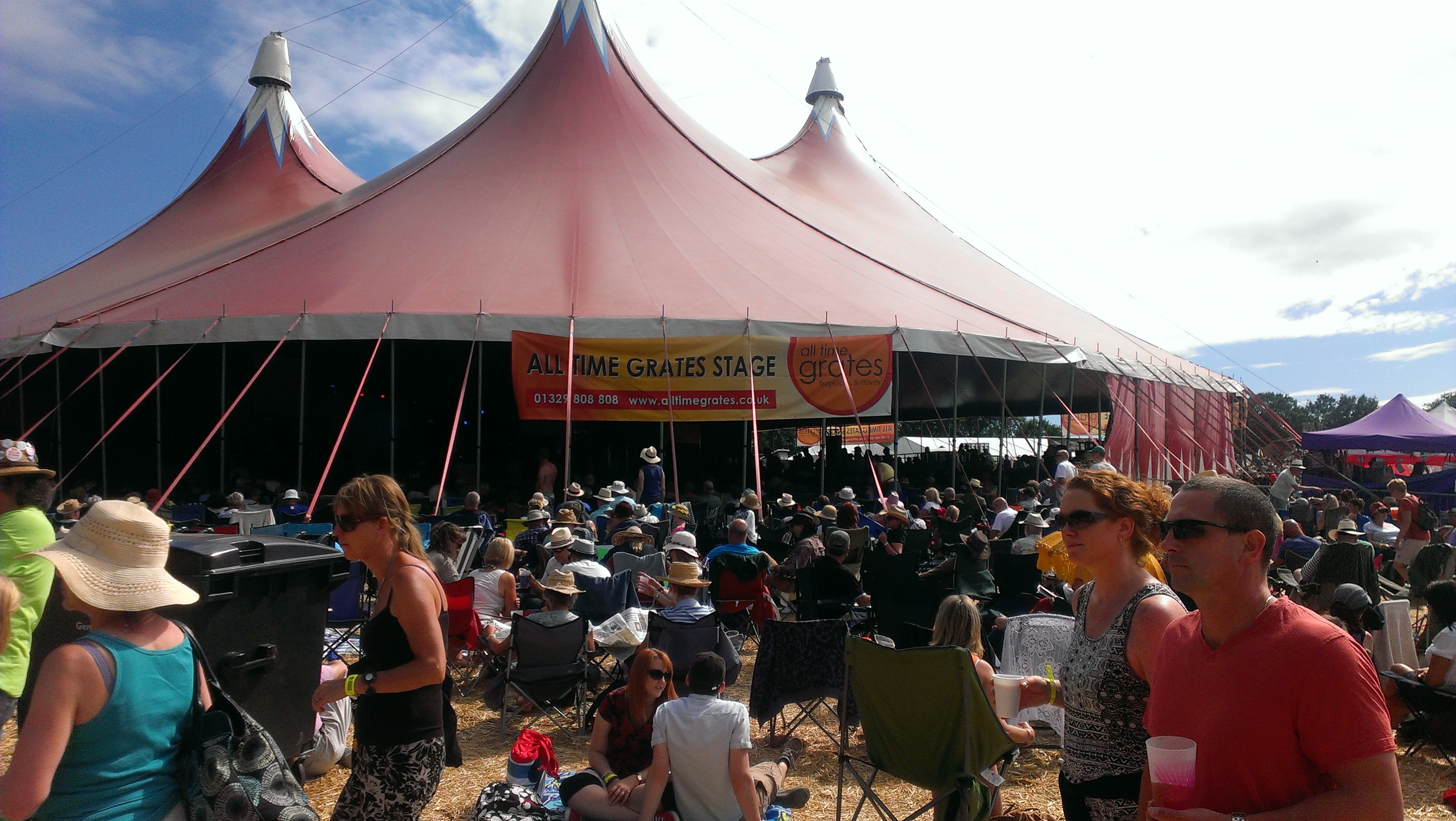
- All Time Grate Main Stage at Wickham Festival All Time Grate Main Stage, 2015
- Status: Active
- Genre: Folk, world, traditional, rock, pop, comedy
- Locations: Hampshire: Eastleigh (2003–2005); Stokes Bay (2008–2009); Wickham (2006–2007, 2010–present)
- Country: United Kingdom
- Years active: 2003–present
- Next event: 29 July 2027 – 1 September 2027
- Participants: See Lineups
- Capacity: 7,000
- Website: wickhamfestival.co.uk

Wickham Festival is a four-day music event that takes place in the village of Wickham, Hampshire, England. Wickham hosts live music and comedy across four stages, as well as food stalls, craft stalls, real ale and cider bars and children's entertainers. It has been listed by The Guardian as a top 'Family Friendly Boutique Festival'. The 2015 Wickham Festival was named Best Festival (under 15,000 capacity) at the Live UK Music Business Awards, and the 2018 event won Best Festival at The Guide Awards, with the 2019 event taking the title of Best Live Event.

Although the history of the festival can be traced to the 2003 Eastleigh Festival, the first Wickham Festival was held from 3–6 August 2006 in and around the village community centre, with a line-up rooted in folk and traditional music. Since then the festival has expanded (moving to its current site in 2013) to become a venue for both well established artists and those just breaking through, across many musical genres, and has previously hosted talks from Tony Benn and Bill Oddie. Recent years have seen high-profile performances from rock and pop artists, including Van Morrison, James Blunt, Kiefer Sutherland, Frank Turner, Wilko Johnson and Lightning Seeds. The festival has not lost touch with its roots, continuing to promote folk music, world music and such festival stalwarts as Richard Thompson, Bellowhead and Steve Earle. Wickham Festival has also introduced British audiences to international musicians, including Carlos Núñez Muñoz, The Spooky Men's Chorale and Le Vent du Nord.

== History ==
The origins of Wickham Festival can be found in the original Gosport Festival of the early 1990s, and the Eastleigh Music Festival. Both these events were organised by local councillor and music promoter Peter Chegwyn.

=== Gosport Festival ===
The original Gosport Festival organised by Chegwyn, Robin Fegan & Pam Pullen ran from 1991 to 1995 on Walpole Park, Gosport, Hampshire. Concerts were held in a 1000 capacity 'Big Top' and an Open Stage. Artists to perform at the festival included Roger Taylor of Queen, B. B. King, The Saw Doctors, The Manfreds and The Bootleg Beatles. The Gosport Festival also saw one of the first shows from the supergroup SAS Band.

=== Gosport and Fareham Easter Festival ===
Mr Chegwyn also organised the popular Gosport & Fareham Easter Folk Festival, which ran from 2001 to 2011, Based out of Fernham Hall, Fareham (the festival also utilised the Ashcroft Arts Centre and Wallington Village Hall), attendees would be treated to four days of folk music, workshops, dance displays, craft fairs, and a Cèilidh.

The festival was set to move to Wickham in 2012, however it was decided to incorporate it into Wickham Festival instead.

=== Eastleigh 'Big Top' Music Festival ===
The current festival began as the Eastleigh 'Big Top' Music festival in 2003:

The history of Eastleigh’s Music Festival can be traced back to 2002 with the involvement of Keith House, Eastleigh’s council leader with his fellow Liberal Democrat and county council colleague Peter Chegwyn who was also a music promoter. Mr Chegwyn had been organising a highly successful music festival in Gosport which had featured artistes like the international blues superstar and guitar legend B. B. King. The intention was to try and replicate the success in Eastleigh.

== Location(s) ==
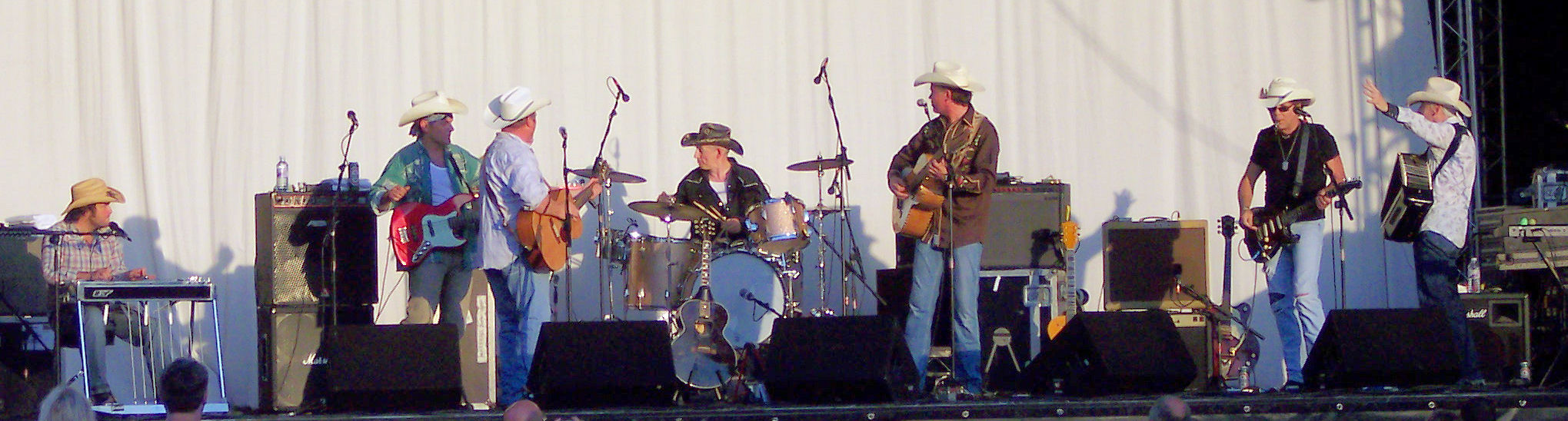
Los Pacaminos at the 2006 Wickham Festival.

=== Previous locations ===
Since the first Eastleigh Music Festival in 2003, the site changed a number of times before settling in its current location.

==== Eastleigh ====
Between 2003 and 2005, the festival took place at Eastleigh Park, Eastleigh. The Eastleigh Music Festival was a six-day event featuring live music and entertainment, with free lunchtime world music concerts, free family entertainment every afternoon and ticketed evening concerts.

==== Stokes Bay ====
The festival moved to Wickham in 2006, however due to issues with Winchester Council, it was relocated for 2008 and 2009. For these two years, Wickham was incorporated in to the Stokes Bay Festival at Stokes Bay, Gosport. The festival returned to Wickham in 2010.

=== Wickham ===
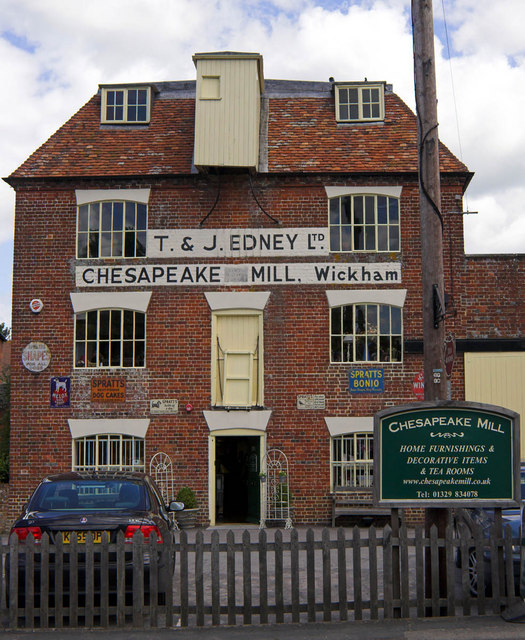
Chesapeake Mill.

Wickham is a village located in Hampshire, just north of Fareham. The historic village square is home to a number of bars, restaurants, boutique shops and hotels. Wickham is also home to the historic Chesapeake Mill, built from the timbers of HMS Chesapeake.

Apart from 2008/2009, the festival has taken place in Wickham since 2006. The first Wickham Festival included performances from Daby Blade from Senegal, Spiers and Boden, Los Pacaminos, Richard Thompson, Shooglenifty, Sparks, Oysterband, Fiddlers' Bid, Osibisa, Flook, Steeleye Span and The Larry Love Showband. These shows primarily took place in and around the Village community centre.

In the years since 2006 the festival site has moved slightly to the fields either side of Blind Lane, north of the village square, steadily expanding to include multiple stages, food and craft fayres, real ale and cider bars, and family entertainment. Camping facilities have also grown to include glamping fields and spaces for motorhomes. In 2024 Wickham Festival moved across the A334 to a new, flatter, grassed site with better access and drainage.

== Present day ==
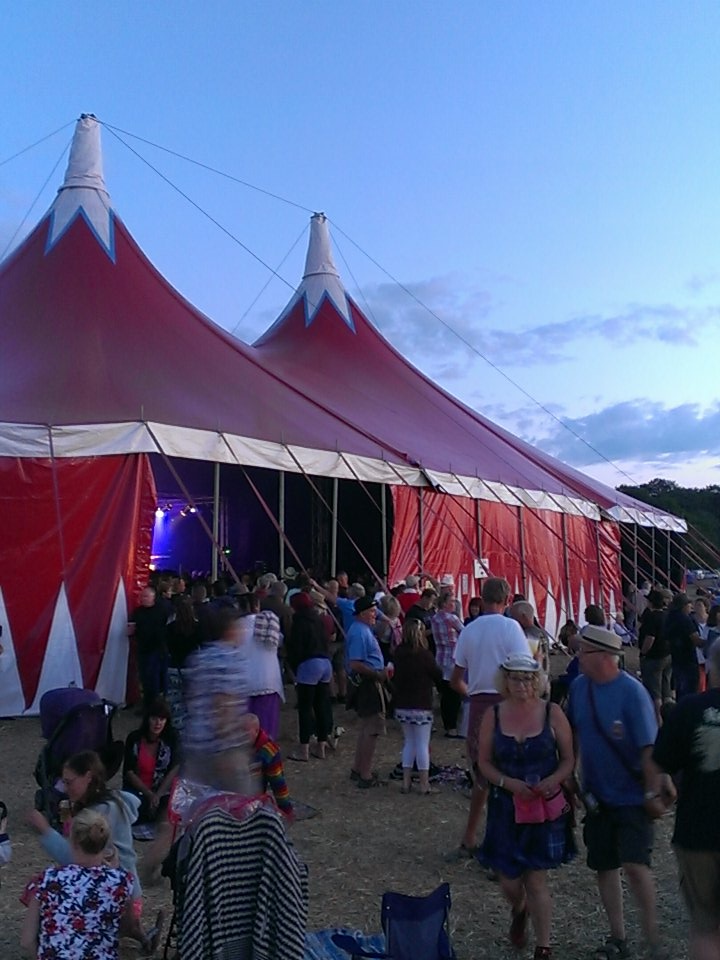
The Second Stage at Wickham Festival 2015

=== 2010s ===
The 2014 festival started with one of Wickham's biggest audiences, when 7,000 people saw James Blunt perform in the Big Top. Other acts to appear that year included Lightning Seeds, Bellowhead, The Ukulele Orchestra of Great Britain and Hugh Cornwell. The festival was also treated to a rare UK appearance from Steve Earle & the Dukes.

2014 also saw the introduction of the Acoustic Stage, and the first editions of the Wickham Festival podcast.

The 2015 festival saw the introduction of an open mic stage and a late night Festival Club, a new viewing platform for the use of disabled festival-goers, and other improved facilities.

Artists appearing at the festival included: Billy Bragg, Seth Lakeman, Eliza Carthy Big Band, 10cc, The Proclaimers, Moulettes, Show of Hands, Martin Carthy, Wilko Johnson, Andy Fairweather-Low, Tom Robinson, De Temps Antan, The Spooky Men's Chorale, Askew Sisters, The South, Lisbee Stainton, Luka Bloom, Tankus the Henge, Les Barker and Roy Bailey.

Wickham Festival 2015 was awarded the 'Best Festival (Cap. under 15,000)' at the 2015 Live Music Awards, and was shortlisted for 'Best Event' at the Portsmouth WOW247 Awards.

The number of stages at the Festival increased for 2016. The site included three covered stages and one open air stage, as well as a performance stage for dancers. All Time Grates sponsored the main stage at the festival, with Sam FM and The Breeze joining the festival to support the second stage.

In 2017 the camping capacity was increased with three added fields, and a free concert at Wickham Community Centre was scheduled to entertain early arrivals on the Wednesday evening.

After its successful launch at the 2017 festival, it was announced that Jonathan Pie would be returning in 2018 to headline the comedy stage. The festival ultimately included five fully programmed stages of music, as well as the late night comedy and the return of a free concert in the Wickham Centre.

Wickham Festival 2018 won the 'Best Festival' award at The News Guide Awards 2019.

=== 2019 ===
Following the conclusion of the 2018 festival, early bird tickets were made available for 2019. The dates for the festival are 1–4 August 2019. A strong line up was put together, featuring Graham Nash, local boy Frank Turner, Hollywood star Kiefer Sutherland and Barnsley comedy-folk stalwarts The Bar-Steward Sons of Val Doonican. The second stage (Village Stage) has been expanded to give it equal billing with the bigtop (Valley Stage).

The 2019 Wickham Festival won the award for 'Outstanding Street Food at a Music Festival' at the Hampshire Street Food Awards.

=== 2020/21 ===
The dates for the 2020 Wickham Festival have been announce as 6-9 August. In September 2019 it was announced The Young'uns will be playing Wickham Festival 2020. Stanley Jordan will be returning to the festival, playing a set of Jimi Hendrix music inspired by his iconic Isle of Wight Festival appearance. Van Morrison was announced as the Saturday night headliner.

On 1 July 2020 it was announced that due to the COVID-19 pandemic Wickham Festival 2020 was being postponed.

Within the announcement it was revealed that the festival would return in 2021, with all 2020 tickets still valid and all booked artists returning.

Following the postponement, a special 'drive-in' concert was arranged with Show of Hands.

The 2021 festival took place on 5–8 August, with a majority of artists that were booked to appear at the postponed 2020 festival agreeing to appear in 2021. Deacon Blue, Fairport Convention and Moya Brennan among those acts added to the line-up.

=== 2022 ===
At the conclusion of the 2021 event, the dates for Wickham Festival 2022 were announced as being 4 to 7 August. Having had to withdraw from the previous festival Waterboys were the first act confirmed for 2022. Saw Doctors will headline in a UK festival exclusive, with Martha Wainwright, Rumer, 10cc and Gilbert O'Sullivan among the many other confirmed acts.

=== 2023 ===
Midge Ure made his first appearance at Wickham Festival, which ran from 3rd-6th August 2024. Toyah Willcox returned to the festival with her husband Robert Fripp, and there were show from Eliza Carthy, Barbara Dickson, Eric Bibb, The Zombies and many others. The weather in 2023 proved a challenge for the festival, prompting a review in to the best use of the site.

=== 2024 ===
Following a review in 2023, Wickham Festival announced a change to the festival site for 2024. Moving across the road to a flatter, grass field with improved access and drainage, Wickham Festival 2024 will bring a newly designed arena for attendees to explore. Rock legend Suzi Quatro was announced as one of the festival's headliners, as well as Curtis Stigers and festival stalwarts Levellers. Icon Tony Christie is also on the bill, and 14 time Grammy winner Jerry Douglas will also be appearing.

== Lineups ==
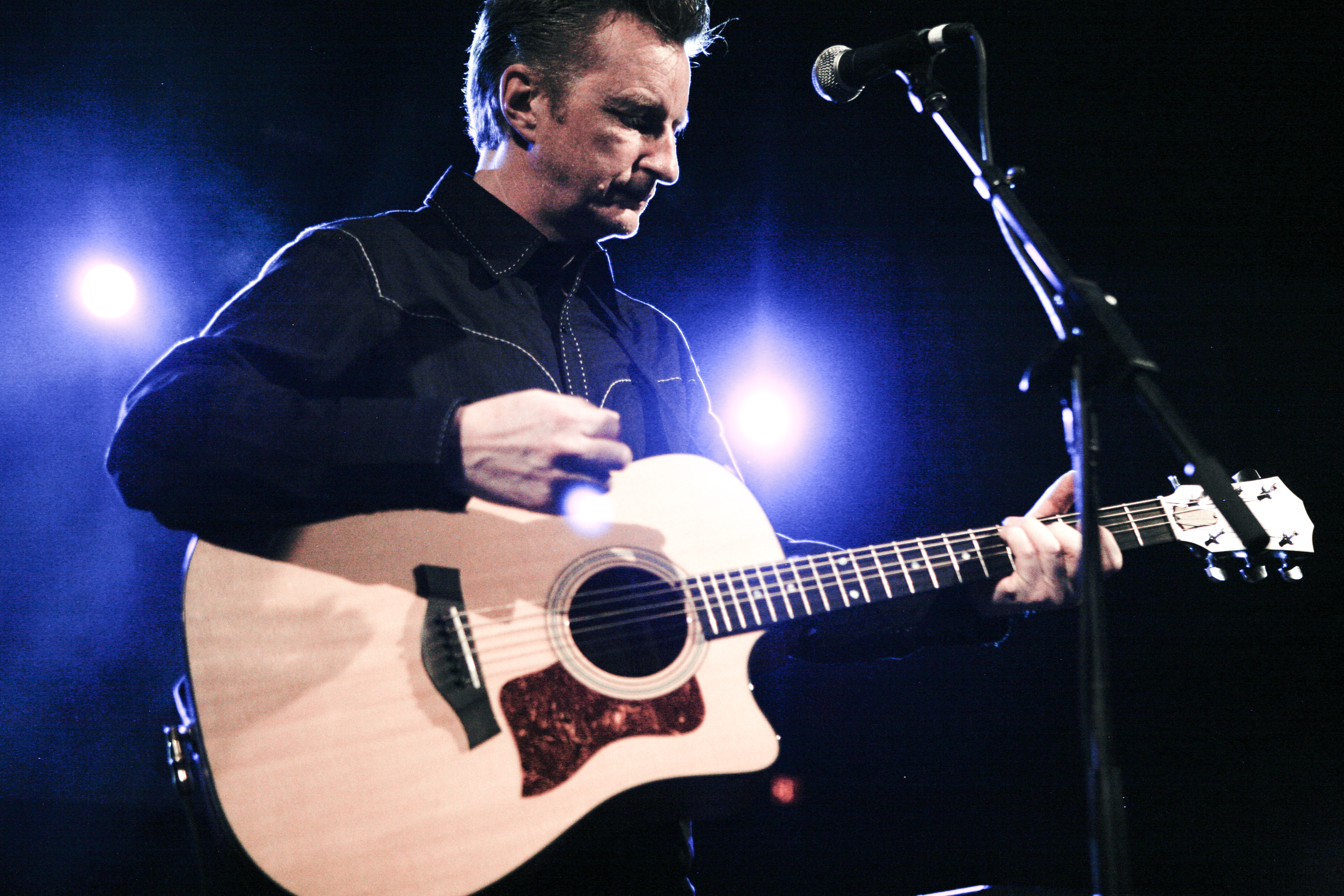
Billy Bragg (seen here performing at South by Southwest) made his first Wickham appearance in 2015

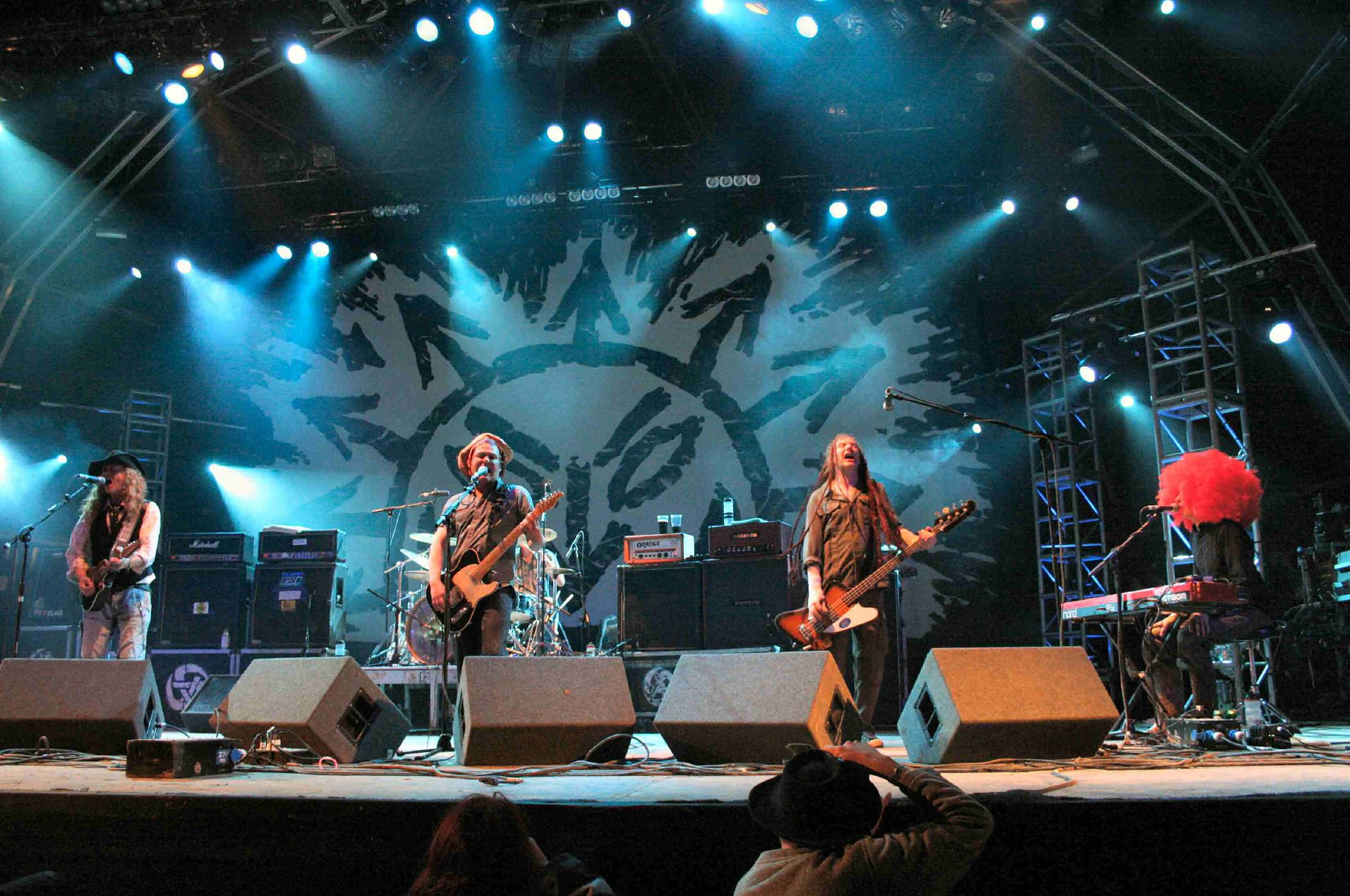
Levellers have played at all three festival sites

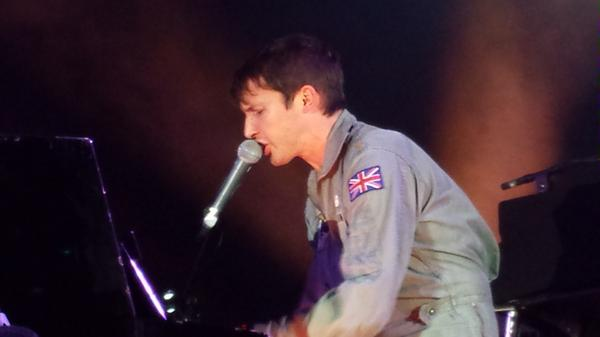
James Blunt drew one of the biggest crowds to Wickham Festival in 2014

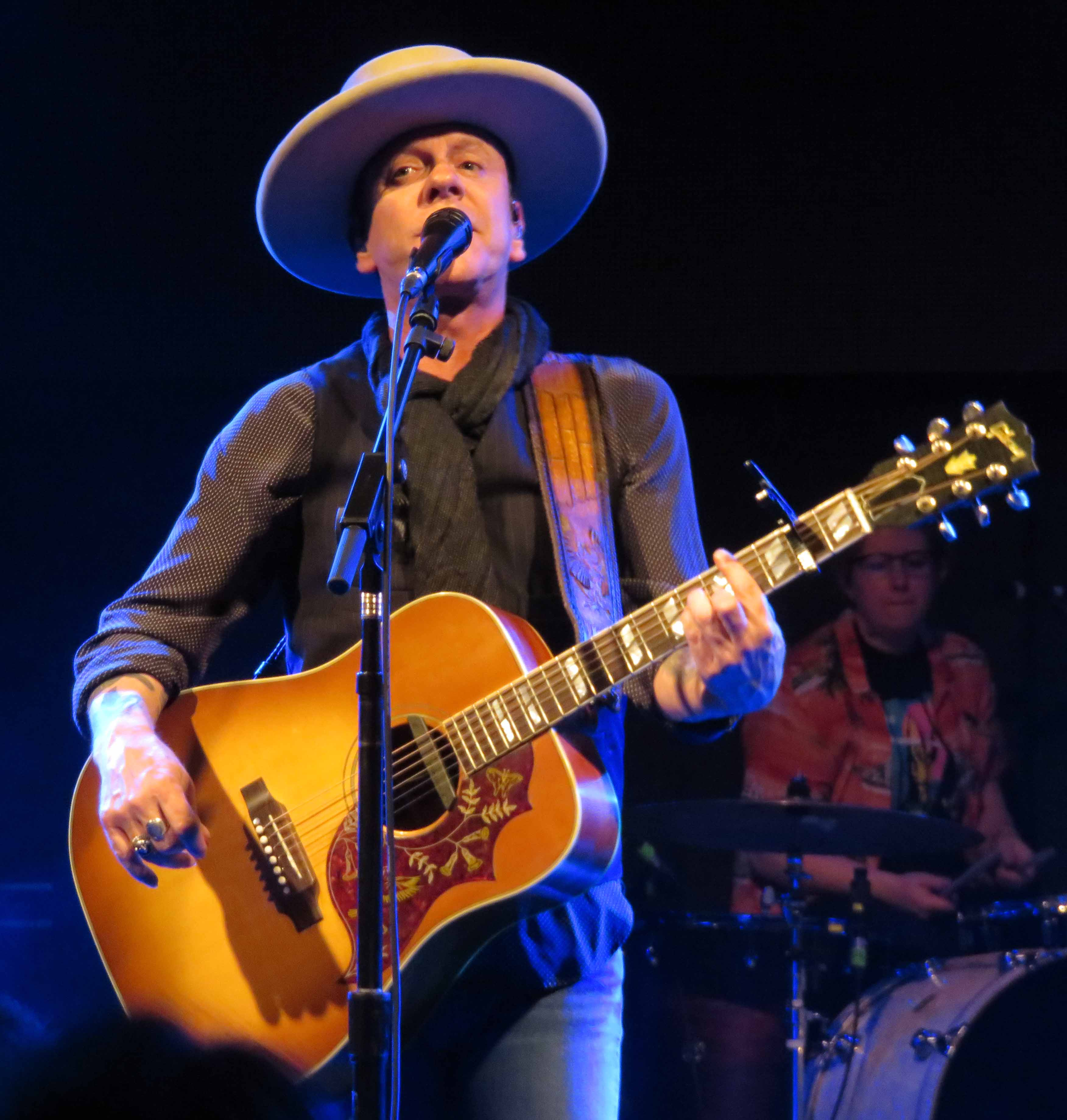
Kiefer Sutherland bought his band to Wickham Festival in 2019

This table shows the 'Main Stage' headliners and other notable performers from the all stages at Wickham Festival.

Year	Location	Dates	Headliners	Notable performers	Comedy (since 2017)
2003	Eastleigh	29 July – 3 August	Bob Geldof · The Drifters · Levellers · SAS Band	The Saw Doctors	
2004		23 July – 1 August	Bill Wyman · Will Young · Steve Harley	Dionne Warwick · Shane MacGowan · Aled Jones	
2005		4–7 August	The Proclaimers · The Saw Doctors · The Undertones	Hayseed Dixie · Beth Nielsen Chapman	
2006	Wickham	3–6 August	Sparks · Spiers and Boden · Richard Thompson · Steeleye Span	Alabama 3 · Seth Lakeman · King Creosote	
2007		2–5 August	Jethro Tull · Eddi Reader · The Saw Doctors	Hazel O'Connor · Shooglenifty · Luka Bloom	
2008	Stokes Bay	31 July – 3 August	Show of Hands · The UOGB · Levellers	Michael McGoldrick · Chumbawamba · The Blockheads	
2009		29 July – 2 August	The Zutons · SAS Band · The Proclaimers	Edward II · Le Vent du Nord · The Spooky Men's Chorale	
2010	Wickham	5–8 August	Eliza Carthy · Shooglenifty · Kid Creole and the Coconuts · Show of Hands	The Undertones · Peatbog Faeries · The Mighty Zulu Nation	
2011		4–7 August	Jools Holland · Richard Thompson · Bellowhead · The Men They Couldn't Hang	Toyah · Kathryn Tickell · Tony Benn	
2012		2–5 August	The Proclaimers · Bellowhead · Levellers	KT Tunstall · The Wurzels · Blair Dunlop	
2013		1–4 August	Dexys · The Waterboys · Seth Lakeman · The Blockheads	Wilko Johnson · 10cc · Moulettes · The South · Public Service Broadcasting	
2014		14–17 August	James Blunt · Lightning Seeds · Steve Earle · Bellowhead	Hugh Cornwell · Oysterband · Dreadzone · The Poozies	
2015		6–9 August	Wilko Johnson · Billy Bragg · The Proclaimers · 10cc	Andy Fairweather-Low · Martin Carthy · Dhol Foundation · Tom Robinson	
2016		4–7 August	Tony Hadley · The Stranglers · SAS Band · Lindisfarne	Trevor Horn · Gretchen Peters · Steeleye Span · Hayseed Dixie · Chas & Dave	
2017		3–6 August	10cc · Show of Hands · Levellers · Peatbog Faeries	KT Tunstall · John Otway · Seth Lakeman · Eliza Carthy	Jonathan Pie · Zoe Lyons · James Veitch · Tom Deacon · Raymond & Mr Timpkins
2018		2–5 August	Steve Harley · Squeeze · Jon Boden & The Remnant Kings	Kate Rusby · The Undertones · John Illsley · Roger Chapman · Richard Thompson · Ferocious Dog	Paul McCaffrey · Jonathan Pie · Tanyalee Davis · Marlon Davis
2019		1–4 August	Judy Collins · Level 42 · Frank Turner · Gilbert O'Sullivan	Kiefer Sutherland · Graham Nash · Alabama 3 · Ralph McTell · The Bar-Steward Sons of Val Doonican	Fin Taylor · Alistair Barrie · Ninia Benjamin · Dave Johns · Ben Norris · Clinton Baptiste
2020		6–9 August	Postponed due to COVID Pandemic		
2021		5–8 August	SAS Band · Show of Hands · Van Morrison · Fairport Convention	Deacon Blue · Eddi Reader · Edward II · Moya Brennan · Nick Lowe · The Dhol Foundation · Capercaillie	Keith Farnan · Sally-Anne Hayward · Steve Bugeja · Raymond & Mr Timpkins · Paul Sinha · Rich Wilson
2022		4–7 August	Saw Doctors · The Waterboys · Levellers · 10cc · Gilbert O'Sullivan	Martha Wainwright · Oysterband · Rumer · The Sharon Shannon Trio · Los Pacaminos · The Undertones	Nathan Caton · Mike Cox · James Dowdeswell · Fiona Ridgewell · Tom Deacon · Matt Bragg · Scott Bennett · Eshaan Akbar
2023		3–6 August	Show of Hands · The Proclaimers · Saw Doctors · Midge Ure	The South · Mary Black · Barbara Dickson · The Zombies · Afro Celt Sound System · the olllam	Mike Cox · Paul McCaffrey · Joe Wells · Dan Evans · Karen Bayley · Paul Cox · Raymond & Mr Timpkins
2024		1–4 August	Suzi Quatro · The Men They Couldn't Hang · Levellers · Tony Christie	Curtis Stigers · Jerry Douglas · Tankus the Henge · Skipinnish · Seth Lakeman	Julian Deane · Stefano Paolini · Jenny Collier · Jarred Christmas · Andrew White · Max Fulham · Mike Cox · Tom Deacon
2025		31 July – 3 August	Lindisfarne · Fisherman's Friends · Richard Thompson · Oysterband	Newton Faulkner · Leo Sayer · Kate Rusby · Lucy Spraggan · Judie Tzuke	Mike Cox · Tom Deacon · Raymond & Mr Timpkins · Ben Van der Velde · Cerys Nelmes · Mary Bourke · Steve Day
2026		30 July – 2 August	Red Hot Chilli Pipers · The Dhol Foundation · Saw Doctors · The Proclaimers	Tommy Emmanuel · Kathryn Tickell · Ferocious Dog · Curtis Stigers · Dervish	Tom Deacon · Charmian Hughes · Jimmy McGhie · Alistair Barrie · Paul McCaffrey · Marcus Birdman
2027		29 July - 1 August	Richard Thompson & Zara Phillips	The Undertones · Eliza Carthy & The Restitution · Martyn Joseph	

== Charity ==
Wickham Festival has worked closely with a number of charities. The festival worked closely with Two Saints, a Fareham-based charity that supports homeless and vulnerable young people across south Hampshire. Thousands of pounds was raised for the charity over a number of years.

The 2016 festival ran in partnership with The League Against Cruel Sports. The League was established in 1924 and campaigns to end cruelty to animals in sport. The charity hosted a sanctuary tent at the Festival, where attendees could learn more about their campaigns and 'enjoy some tranquillity'.

Starting in 2021 a guitar signed by artists appearing at the festival has been raffled, to raise money for the music therapy charity George's Rockstars. The raffles have raised thousands of pounds for the charity.
