= William Cocks =

William Cocks may refer to:

- William W. Cocks (1861–1932), American politician
- William Alfred Cocks (1892–1971), English clockmaker and Northumbrian pipemaker
- William Pennington Cocks (1791–1878), English surgeon naturalist
- Bill Cocks (1936–2011), Australian footballer

== See also ==
- William Cox (disambiguation)
- William Coxe (disambiguation)
