= William Coxon =

William Coxon may refer to:

- William Coxon, American politician, see 8th Arizona State Legislature
- Billy Coxon (1933-2018), English footballer, see List of AFC Bournemouth players

== See also ==
- William Cox (disambiguation)
- William Coxen
