= Capture of USS Chesapeake =

1813 naval battle of the War of 1812

- Part of the War of 1812
- Print of the engagement
| Date | 1 June 1813 |
| Location | Off Boston, Atlantic Ocean 42°39′2″N 70°33′56″W |
| Result | British victory |

Belligerents
| United Kingdom | United States |

Commanders and leaders
| Philip Broke (WIA) | James Lawrence † |

Strength
| Frigate Shannon | Frigate Chesapeake |

Casualties and losses
| 23 killed; 56 wounded | 48 killed; 99 wounded; 232 captured; Chesapeake captured |

The capture of USS Chesapeake, also known as the Battle of Boston Harbor, was fought on 1 June 1813, between the Royal Navy frigate HMS Shannon and the United States Navy frigate USS Chesapeake, as part of the War of 1812 between the United States and the United Kingdom. The Chesapeake was captured in a brief but intense action in which 71 men were killed. This was the only frigate action of the war in which there was no preponderance of force on either side.

At Boston, Captain James Lawrence took command of Chesapeake on 20 May 1813, and on 1 June, put to sea to meet the waiting HMS Shannon, commanded by Captain Philip Broke. Broke had issued a written challenge to Chesapeake's commander, but Chesapeake had sailed before it was delivered.

Chesapeake suffered heavily in the exchange of gunfire, having her wheel and fore topsail halyard shot away, rendering her unmanoeuvrable. Lawrence himself was mortally wounded and was carried below. The American crew struggled to carry out their captain's last order, "Don't give up the ship!", with the British boarding party quickly overwhelming them. The battle was notably intense but of short duration, lasting ten to fifteen minutes, in which time 226 men were killed or wounded. Shannon's captain was severely injured in fighting on the forecastle, but survived his wounds.

Chesapeake and her crew were taken to Halifax, Nova Scotia, where the sailors were taken to prisoner-of-war camps; the ship was repaired and taken into service by the Royal Navy. She was sold at Portsmouth, England, in 1819 and broken up. Surviving timbers were used to build the nearby Chesapeake Mill in Wickham and can be seen and visited to this day. Shannon survived longer, being broken up in 1859.

== Prelude ==
=== Philip Broke and his naval gunnery ===
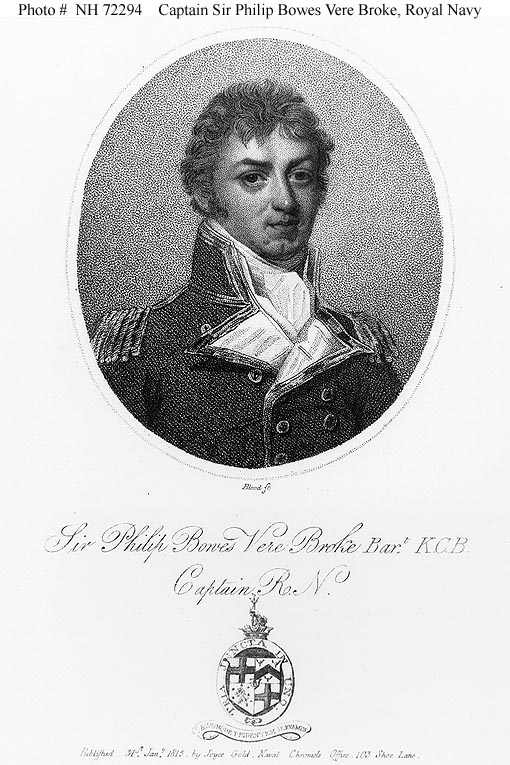
Captain Philip Broke

During his long period in command of Shannon, Captain Philip Broke (pronounced 'Brook') of the Royal Navy introduced many practical refinements to his 'great guns', which were virtually unheard of elsewhere in contemporary naval gunnery. He had 'dispart sights' fitted to his 18-pounder long guns, which improved aiming as they compensated for the external narrowing of the barrels from the breech to the muzzle. He had adjustable tangent sights that would give accuracy at different ranges. He had the elevating 'quoins' (wedge-shaped pieces of wood placed under the breech) of his long guns grooved to mark various degrees of elevation so that his guns could be reliably levelled to fire horizontally in any state of heeling of the ship under a press of sail. The carronades were similarly treated, but the elevating screws on these cannon were marked in paint. As the decks of contemporary ships curved upwards towards the stern and bows, he cut down the wheels on the "up-slope" side of each cannon's carriage in order that all guns were level with the horizon. He also introduced a system where bearings were incised into the deck next to each gun; fire could then be directed to any bearing independent of the ability of any particular gun crew to see the target. Fire from the whole battery could also be focused on any part of an enemy ship.

Broke drilled his crew to an extremely high standard of naval gunnery; he regularly had them fire at targets, such as floating barrels. Often these drills would be made into competitions to see which gun crew could hit the target first and how fast they could do so. He even had his gun crews fire at targets 'blindfold' to good effect; they were only given the bearing to lay their gun on without being allowed to sight the gun on the target themselves. This constituted a very early example of 'director firing'.

In addition to these gunnery drills, Broke was fond of preparing hypothetical scenarios to test his crew. For example, after all hands had been drummed to quarters, he would inform them of a theoretical attack and see how they would act to defend the ship. Though the use of cutlasses in training was avoided, a method of swordsmanship training called 'singlestick' was regularly practiced. This was a game employing roughly similar cuts, thrusts and parries as were used with the cutlass, but as it was played with wooden sticks with wicker hand guards; hits, although painful, were not often dangerous. It soon developed quickness of eye and wrist. Many of the crew became very expert.

=== James Lawrence ===
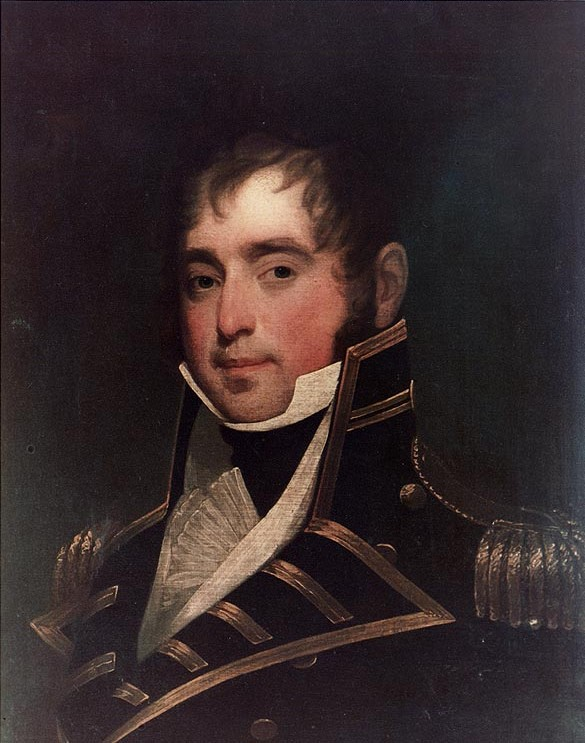
Captain James Lawrence

Commander Lawrence of the United States Navy returned from a successful war cruise having defeated the sloop HMS Peacock. He was promoted to captain for his victory, and received orders to take command of USS Chesapeake. It was not a command that he particularly wanted, as he had hoped for the larger frigate USS Constitution instead. Lawrence travelled to Boston, where he found that most of the former crew of Chesapeake had left over a dispute over prize money, and had been replaced. Lawrence's prior experience of the Royal Navy worked against him: in his earlier battle with HMS Peacock, the warship had been bravely fought, but the British gunnery had been nothing less than atrocious. His crew was laden with good seamen; however, they lacked the time working together that was needed to change a collection of good seamen into an efficient fighting crew. Lawrence's assumptions concerning the poor quality of the opposition made him over-confident in facing the adversary he was about to encounter.

=== Issuing a challenge ===
Eager to engage and defeat one of the American frigates that had already scored a number of victories over the Royal Navy in single-ship confrontations, Broke prepared a challenge. USS President had already slipped out of the harbour under the cover of fog and had evaded the British. Constitution was undergoing extensive repairs and alterations and would not be ready for sea in the foreseeable future. However, Chesapeake appeared to be ready to put to sea. Consequently, Broke decided to challenge Chesapeake, which had been refitting in Boston harbour under the command of Captain James Lawrence, offering single ship-to-ship combat. Whilst patrolling offshore, Shannon had intercepted and captured a number of American ships attempting to reach the harbour. After sending two of them off to Halifax, he found that his crew was being dangerously reduced. Broke therefore resorted to burning the rest of the prizes in order to conserve his highly trained crew in anticipation of the battle with Chesapeake. The boats from the burnt prizes were sent into Boston, carrying Broke's oral invitation to Lawrence to come out and engage him. Broke had already sent Tenedos away in the hope that the more favourable odds would entice the Americans out, but eventually began to despair that Chesapeake would ever come out of the harbour. He finally decided to send a written challenge. In this he was copying his adversary. Lawrence had earlier in the war, when captain of the sloop of war Hornet, sent a written invitation to the captain of the British sloop of war Bonne Citoyenne to a single-ship contest. Lawrence's offer had been declined.

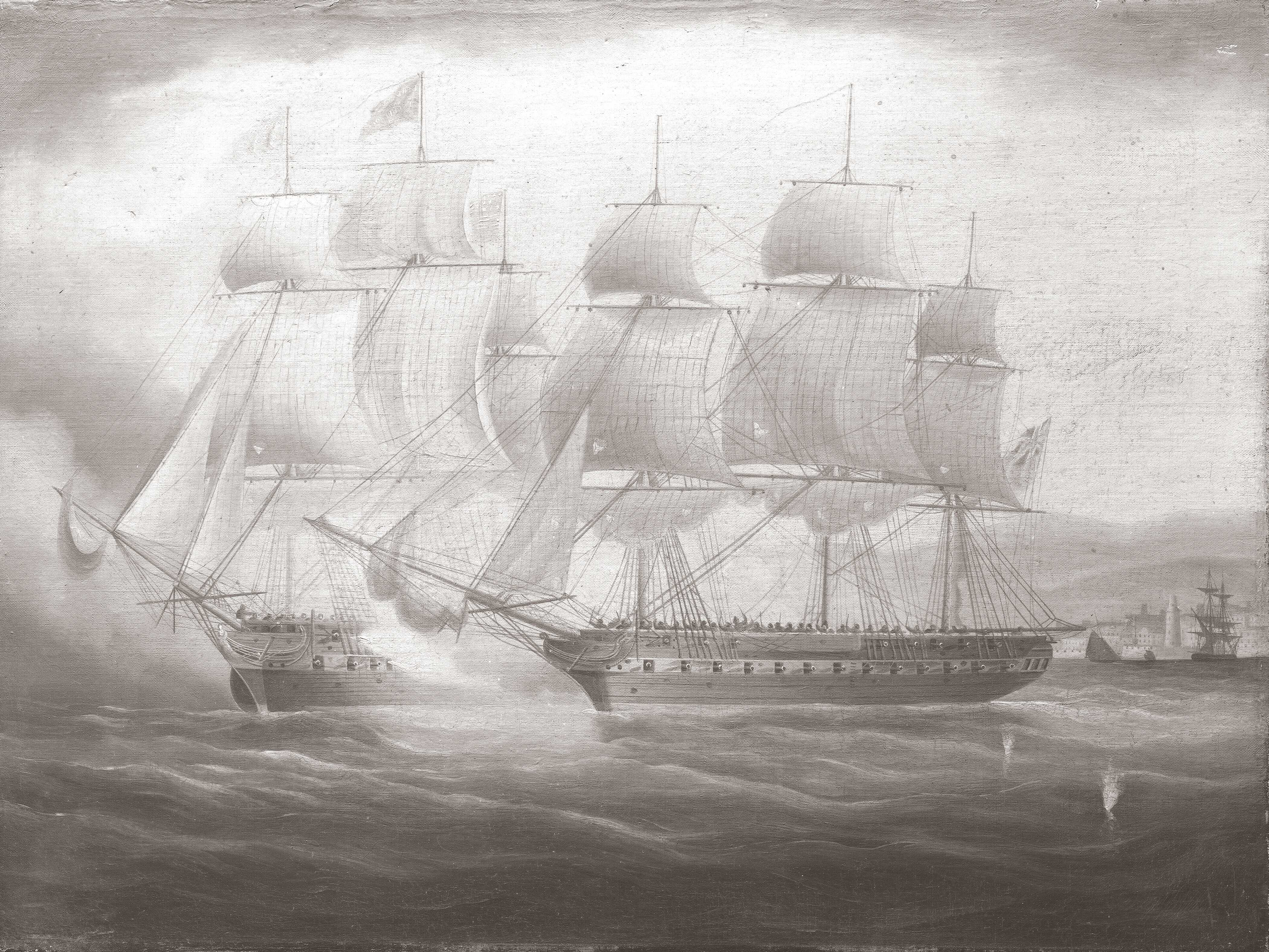
HMS Shannon, foreground, in action with USS Chesapeake, from a painting by Thomas Buttersworth

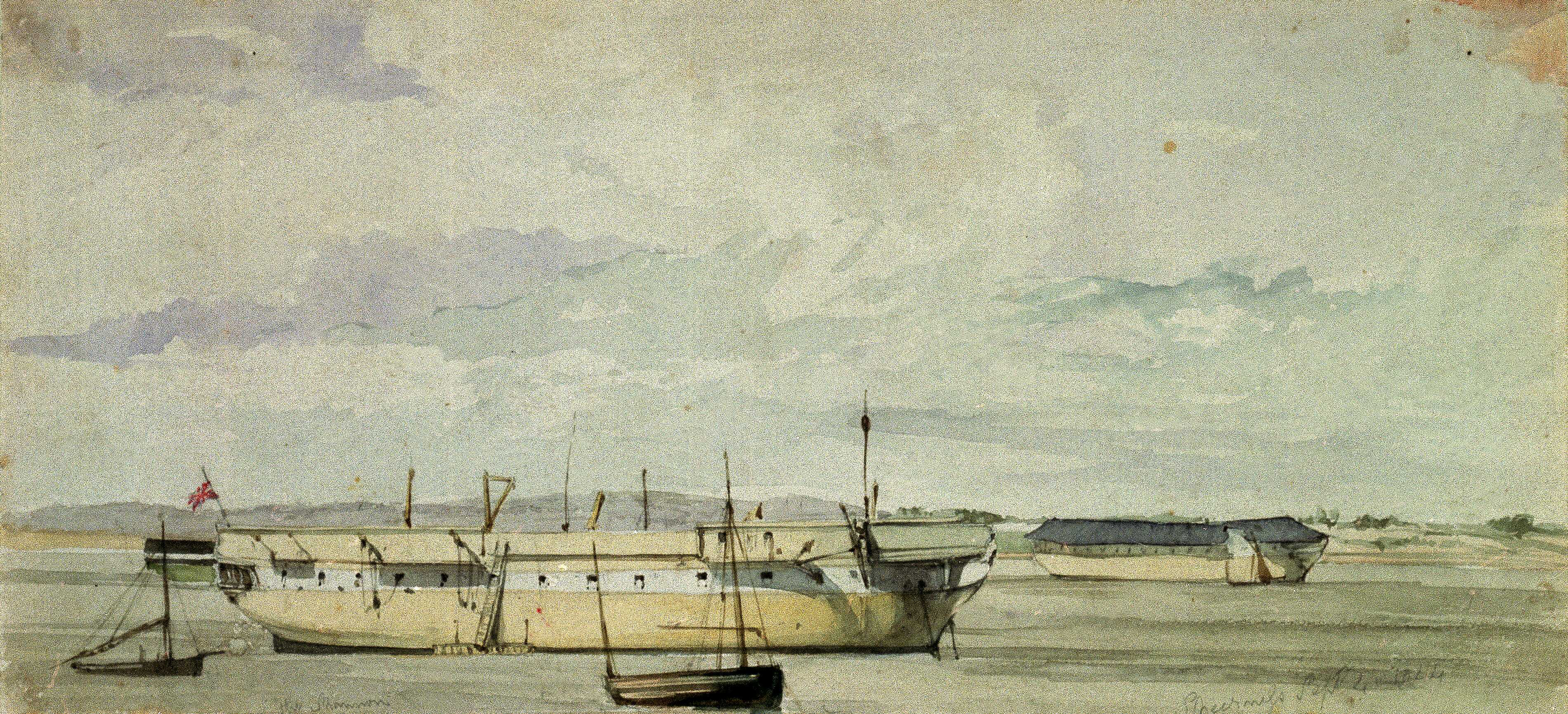
HMS Shannon, depicted in 1844, de-masted and roofed over as a receiving ship near the end of her working life. Ink and wash drawing by Captain George Pechell Mends

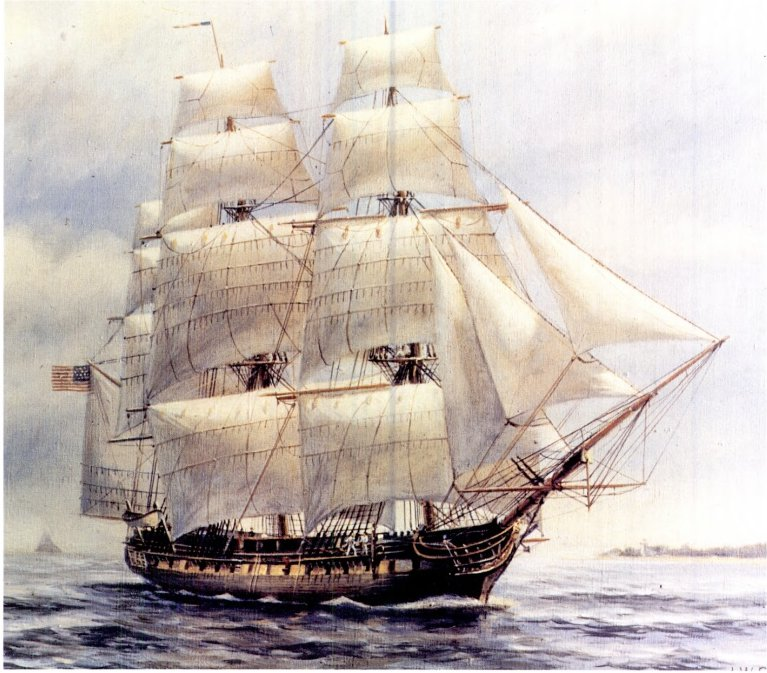
USS Chesapeake, modern painting by F. Muller.

As the Chesapeake appears now ready for sea, I request you will do me the favour to meet the Shannon with her, ship to ship, to try the fortune of our respective flags. The Shannon mounts twenty-four guns upon her broadside and one light boat-gun; 18 pounders upon her maindeck, and 32-pounder carronades upon her quarterdeck and forecastle; and is manned with a complement of 300 men and boys, beside thirty seamen, boys, and passengers, who were taken out of recaptured vessels lately. I entreat you, sir, not to imagine that I am urged by mere personal vanity to the wish of meeting the Chesapeake, or that I depend only upon your personal ambition for your acceding to this invitation. We have both noble motives. You will feel it as a compliment if I say that the result of our meeting may be the most grateful service I can render to my country; and I doubt not that you, equally confident of success, will feel convinced that it is only by repeated triumphs in even combats that your little navy can now hope to console your country for the loss of that trade it can no longer protect. Favour me with a speedy reply. We are short of provisions and water, and cannot stay long here.

— Philip Broke, challenge as condensed by James and Chamier 1837 (Note: This is a shortened version, the original ran to six paragraphs in length. The full message can be found in Padfield, pp. 144–146.)

Captain Lawrence did not receive Broke's letter. According to Ian W. Toll, he had already decided to leave harbour at the first favourable weather. The fact that it was not in his nation's interests at this point in the war to be challenging British frigates seems to have not entered into his reasoning. When USS President had slipped out of harbor, it was to embark on a commerce-raiding mission, which was deemed in the U.S. national interest. Half of the officers and up to one quarter of the crew were new to the ship. In the short time he was in command of the Chesapeake, Lawrence had twice exercised his crew at the great guns, walking the decks and personally supervising the drill. He also instigated a signal, a bugle call, to call on his crew to board an enemy vessel. Unfortunately the only crew member able to produce a note on the bugle was a "dull-witted" 'loblolly boy' (surgeon's assistant) called William Brown. Lawrence believed that he would win the battle and wrote two quick notes, one to the Secretary of the Navy pronouncing his intentions, and another to his brother in-law asking him to look after Lawrence's wife and children in event of his death.

Bostonians and their neighbours anticipated great results from the celebrated Lawrence and his crew. Local authorities reserved a space at the docks in expectation of accommodating the captured British man-of-war. Also plans were set in motion for a gala victory banquet. As the American warship moved down the harbour, citizens raced to vantage points to witness the fight. Crowds gathered on available heights from Lynn to Malden and from Cohasset to Scituate. A diarist likened the Salem crowds to swarms of bees. The more daring took to boats to follow the Chesapeake. A Boston newspaper reported the bay being covered with civilian craft of all kinds.

HMS Shannon had been off Boston for 56 days and was running short of provisions, whilst the extended period at sea was wearing the ship down. She would be at a disadvantage facing USS Chesapeake, fresh from harbour and a refit. A boat was despatched carrying the invitation, manned by a Mr Slocum, a discharged American prisoner. The boat had not reached the shore when Chesapeake was seen underway, sailing out of the harbour. She was flying three American ensigns and a large white flag at the foremast inscribed 'Free Trade and Sailor's Rights'. Shannon carried 276 officers, seamen and marines of her proper complement, eight recaptured seamen, 22 Irish labourers who had been 48 hours in the ship, of whom only four could speak English, and 24 boys, of whom about 13 were under 12 years of age. Broke had trained his gun crews to fire accurate broadsides into the hulls of enemy vessels, with the aim of killing their gun crews, rather than attempting to disable the enemy ship by firing at the masts and rigging. This was, however, the standard Royal Navy practice of the time, only Broke's efficiency in gunnery training distinguished him in this regard. Lawrence, meanwhile, was confident in his ship, especially since she carried a substantially larger crew. Previous American victories over Royal Navy ships left him expectant of success. Just before the engagement, the American crew gave three cheers.

The two ships were about as close a match in size and force as was possible, given the variations in ship design and armament existing between contemporary navies. USS Chesapeake's (rated at 38 guns) armament of 28 18-pounder long guns was an exact match for HMS Shannon. Measurements proved the ships to be about the same deck length, the only major difference being the ships' complements: Chesapeake's 379 against the Shannon's 330.

Comparison of the combatant vessels
| | HMS Shannon | USS Chesapeake |
|---|---|---|
| Length (gundeck) | 150 ft 2 in (45.77 m) | 151 ft 0 in (46.02 m) |
| Beam | 39 ft 11 in (12.17 m) | 40 ft 11 in (12.47 m) |
| Tonnage | 1065 tons | 1135 tons |
| Complement | 330 men | 379 men |
| Armament | 28 × 18-pounder long guns 16 × 32-pounder carronades 2 × 9-pounder dismantling guns 1 × 6-pounder long gun* 1 × 12-pounder boat carronade* | 28 × 18-pounder long guns 20 × 32-pounder carronades 1 × 18-pounder chase gun |

* Broke shipped the smaller calibre guns (6-pounder, and 12-pounder carronade) in order that the younger midshipmen and ship's boys had light-weight ordnance that they could practise all aspects of gun laying and firing with.

== Battle ==
=== Gunnery duel ===
Chesapeake (left) shortening sail as she bears down on Shannon, who has backed her main topsail to await the American ship

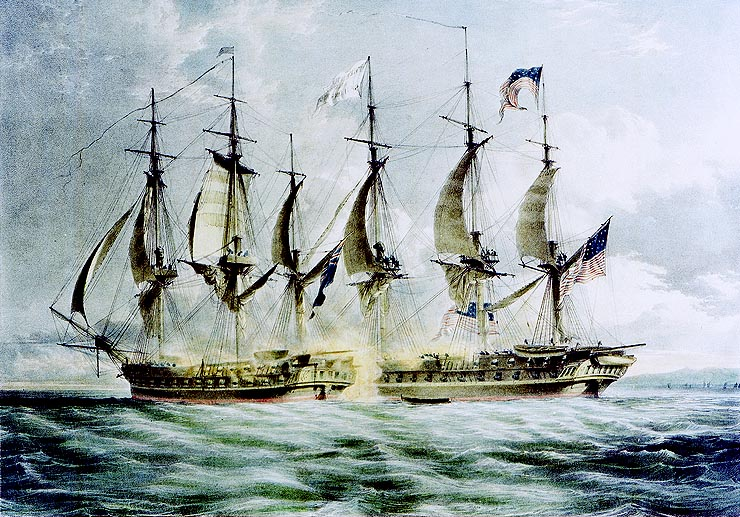
The commencement of the action, with the two frigates exchanging gunfire at close range

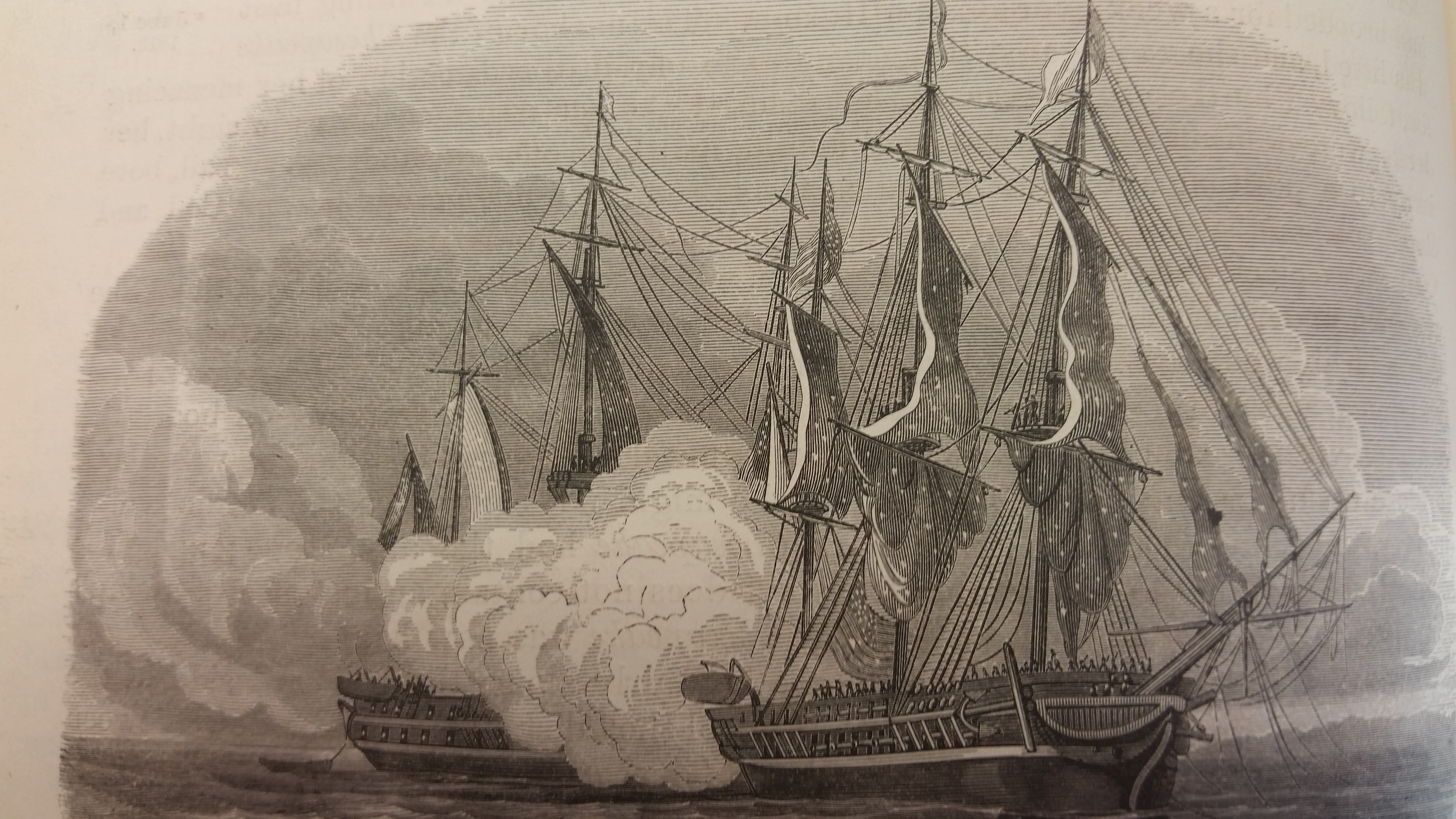
The crisis-point of the engagement – Chesapeake (right) has run ahead of Shannon and is 'luffing up' out of control, and presenting her stern quarter to Shannon's broadside. If the image is entirely accurate it must represent the moment after Chesapeake's helm had been destroyed, but before her fore-topsail halyard was shot away.

As the American ship approached, Broke spoke to his crew, ending with a description of his philosophy of gunnery, "Throw no shot away. Aim every one. Keep cool. Work steadily. Fire into her quarters – maindeck to maindeck, quarterdeck to quarterdeck. Don't try to dismast her. Kill the men and the ship is yours."

The two ships met at half past five in the afternoon, 20 nautical miles (37 km) east of the Boston Light, between Cape Ann and Cape Cod. Shannon was flying a weather-worn blue ensign, and her dilapidated outside appearance after a long period at sea suggested that she would be an easy opponent. Observing the Chesapeake's many flags, a sailor had questioned Broke: "Mayn't we have three ensigns, sir, like she has?" "No," said Broke, "we've always been an unassuming ship." HMS Shannon refused to fire upon USS Chesapeake as she bore down, nor did USS Chesapeake attempt to rake HMS Shannon, despite having the weather gage. Lawrence's behaviour that day earned him praise from the British officers for gallantry.

The two ships opened fire just before 18:00 at a range of about 35 metres (115 ft), with Shannon scoring the first hit, striking Chesapeake on one of her forward gunports with two round shot and a bag of musket balls fired by William Mindham, the gun captain of the aftmost of Shannon's starboard 18-pounders. Chesapeake was moving faster than Shannon, and as she ranged down the side of the British ship, the destruction inflicted by the precise and methodical gunnery of the British crew moved aft with the American's forward gun crews suffering the heaviest losses. However, the American crew were well drilled and, despite their losses, returned fire briskly. As Chesapeake was heeling, many of their shots struck the water or waterline of Shannon causing little damage, but American carronade fire caused serious damage to Shannon's rigging. In particular, a 32-pound carronade ball struck the piled shot for the Shannon's 12-pounder gun that was stowed in the main chains; the shot was propelled through the timbers to scatter like hail across the gundeck.

As the distance closed, the Shannon's gun crews and topmen kept up a relentless fire, and the unprotected quarter-deck became as uninhabitable as the surface of the moon.

— Ian W. Toll

Captain Lawrence realised that his ship's speed would take it past Shannon and ordered a 'pilot's luff'. This was a small and brief turn to windward which would make the sails shiver and reduce the ship's speed. Just after Chesapeake began this limited turn away from Shannon, she had her means of manoeuvring entirely disabled as a second round of accurate British fire caused more losses, most critically to the men and officers manning Chesapeake's quarterdeck. Here the helmsmen were killed by a 9-pounder gun that Broke had ordered installed on the quarterdeck for that very purpose, and the same gun shortly afterwards shot away the wheel itself. Surviving American gun crews did land hits on Shannon in their second round of fire, especially American carronade fire which swept Shannon's forecastle, killing three men, wounding others and disabling Shannon's forward 9-pounder gun while one round shot demolished Shannon's ship's bell.

At almost the same time as Chesapeake lost control of her helm, her fore-topsail halyard was shot away, her fore-topsail yard then dropped, and she 'luffed up'. Losing her forward momentum, she yawed further into the wind until she was 'in irons', her sails were pressed back against her masts and she then made sternway (went backwards). Her port stern quarter (rear left corner) made contact with Shannon's starboard side, level with the fifth gunport from the bow, and Chesapeake was caught by the projecting fluke of one of Shannon's anchors, which had been stowed on the gangway. Chesapeake's spanker boom then swung over the deck of the British ship. Mr Stevens, Shannon's boatswain, lashed the boom inboard to keep the two ships together, and lost an arm as he did so.

Trapped against Shannon at an angle in which few of her guns could fire on the British ship, and unable to manoeuvre away, Chesapeake's stern now became exposed and was swept by raking fire. Earlier in the action Shannon's gunnery had devastated Chesapeake's forward gun crews; this destruction was now inflicted on the gun crews in the aft part of the ship. The American ship's situation worsened when a small open cask of musket cartridges abaft the mizzen-mast blew up. When the smoke cleared, Broke judged the time was right and gave the order to board. Captain Lawrence also gave the order to board, but the frightened bugler aboard Chesapeake, William Brown, failed to sound the call, and only those near Lawrence heard his command. By this time Lawrence was the only officer left on the upper deck, as Lieutenants Ludlow and Ballard had been wounded. Lieutenant Cox, who had brought up men from the lower deck to form a boarding party, reached the quarterdeck only to find that his captain had been badly, indeed mortally, wounded by musket fire. Lawrence was clinging to the binnacle in order to stay upright; Cox, who had served all his sea life with Lawrence, carried him down to the cockpit with the help of two sailors. As he was being taken down Lawrence called out "Tell the men to fire faster! Don't give up the ship!" D R Hickey, in a book under that title about myths from the war, reports this but notes that others quoted his words as, "Don't surrender the ship!", "Never give up the ship.", or "Never strike the flag of my ship."

=== The British board ===
Contrasting impressions of the taking of the Chesapeake

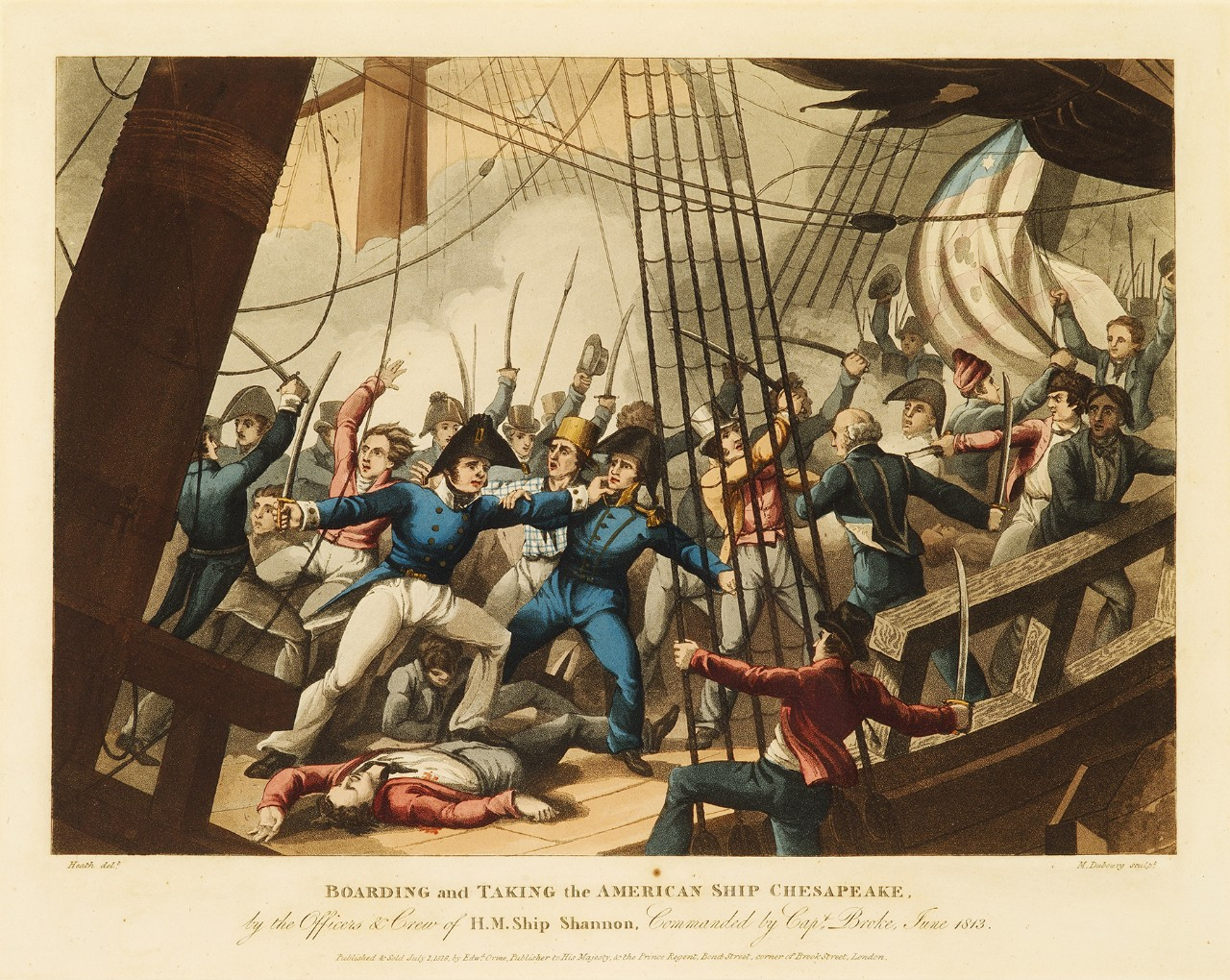
Broke leads the boarding party aboard Chesapeake. In reality Broke wore a round hat when boarding instead of a bicorne.

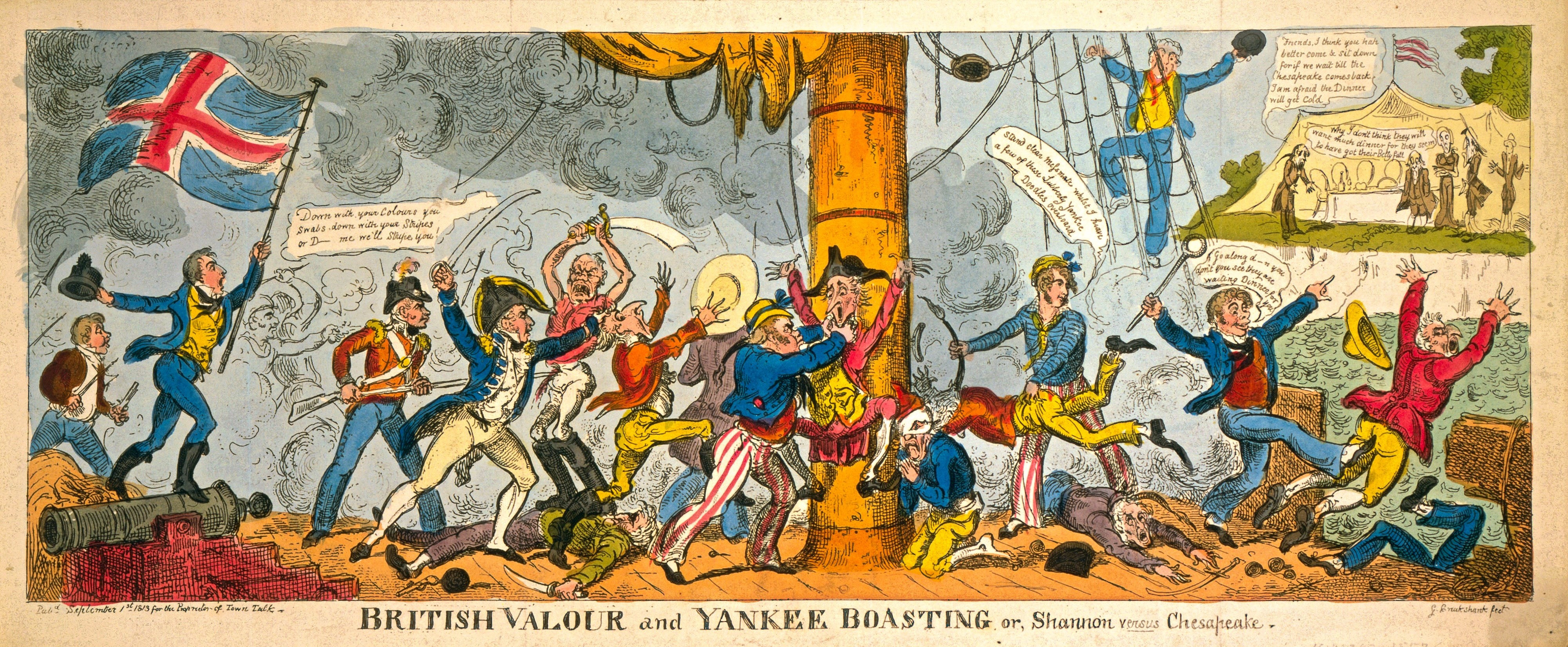
George Cruikshank portrayed the Americans as hapless and cowardly.

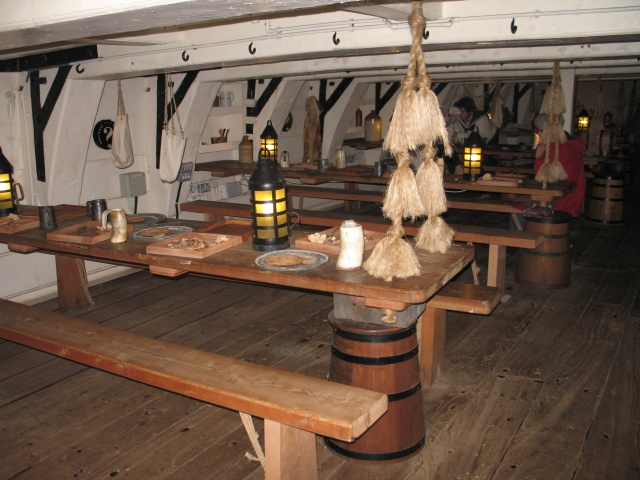
The berth deck of a 38-gun frigate, HMS Trincomalee.

In contrast to the confusion and loss of leadership aboard the American vessel, the British boarding party was being effectively organised. A number of small-arms men rushed aboard Chesapeake, led by Broke, including the purser, Mr G. Aldham, and the clerk, Mr John Dunn. Aldham and Dunn were killed as they crossed the gangway, but the rest of the party made it onto Chesapeake. Captain Broke, at the head of not more than twenty men, stepped from the rail of the hammock netting onto the muzzle of the port-side carronade of Chesapeake closest to the stern, and from there he jumped down to her quarterdeck. As the British boarded there were no American officers left on the quarterdeck to organise resistance.

The maindeck of Chesapeake was almost deserted, having been swept by Shannon's gunfire; the surviving gun crews had either responded to the call for boarders or had taken refuge below. Two American officers, Lieutenant Cox (who had returned from carrying Captain Lawrence down to the surgeon) and Midshipman Russell saw that the aftmost 18-pounders on the port side still bore on Shannon. Working between them, they managed to fire both.

Lieutenant Ludlow, who had been slightly wounded and had gone down to Chesapeake's cockpit for treatment, now returned to the upper decks, rallying some of the American crew as he did so. Lieutenant Budd joined him with a band of men he had led up the fore-hatch. Ludlow led them in a counter-attack which pushed the British back as far as the binnacle. However, a wave of British reinforcements arrived, Ludlow received a mortal wound from a cutlass, and the Americans were again thrown back. James Bulger, one of Shannon's Irishmen, charged into the Americans wielding a boarding pike and shouting Gaelic curses – "And then did I not spit them, beJaysus!" Lacking officers to lead them (Lieutenant Budd had also been wounded by a cutlass) and lacking support from below, the Americans were driven back by the boarders. American resistance then fell apart, with the exception of a band of men on the forecastle and those in the tops. A number of the Americans driven from the upper decks jostled each other to get down the main hatchway to the comparative safety of the berth deck. Seeing this, Lt. Cox called to them, "You damned cowardly sons of bitches! What are you jumping below for?" When asked by a nearby midshipman if he should stop them by cutting a few down, Cox replied, "No sir, it is of no use."

Fighting had also been ongoing between the tops (platforms at the junction of mast and topmast) of the ships, as rival sharpshooters fired upon their opponents and upon sailors on the exposed decks below. While the ships were locked together, the British marksmen, led by midshipman William Smith, commander of the fore-top, stormed Chesapeake's fore-top over the yard-arm and killed all the Americans there. Following this, the wind tore the two ships apart, and Chesapeake was blown around the bows of Shannon. This left the British boarders, about fifty-strong, stranded. However, organised resistance aboard the American ship had almost ceased by this time.

Broke himself led a charge against a number of the Americans who had managed to rally on the forecastle. Three American sailors, probably from the rigging, descended and attacked him. Taken by surprise, he killed the first, but the second hit him with a musket which stunned him, whilst the third sliced open his skull with a sabre or cutlass, knocking him to the deck. Before the sailor could finish Broke off, the American was bayoneted by a British Marine named John Hill. Shannon's crew rallied to the defence of their captain and carried the forecastle, killing the remaining Americans. Broke sat, dizzied and weak, on a carronade slide, and his head was bound up by William Mindham, who used his own neckerchief. One of Shannon's lieutenants, Provo Wallis, believed that Broke's three assailants were probably British deserters. The desperate and violent attempt on Broke's life made by these men may have been motivated by the fact that they faced the death penalty under the Royal Navy's Articles of War as deserters. Meanwhile, Shannon's First Lieutenant, Mr George T. L. Watt, had attempted to hoist the British colours over Chesapeake's, but this was misinterpreted aboard Shannon, and he was hit in the forehead by grapeshot and killed as he did so.

=== Chesapeake is taken ===
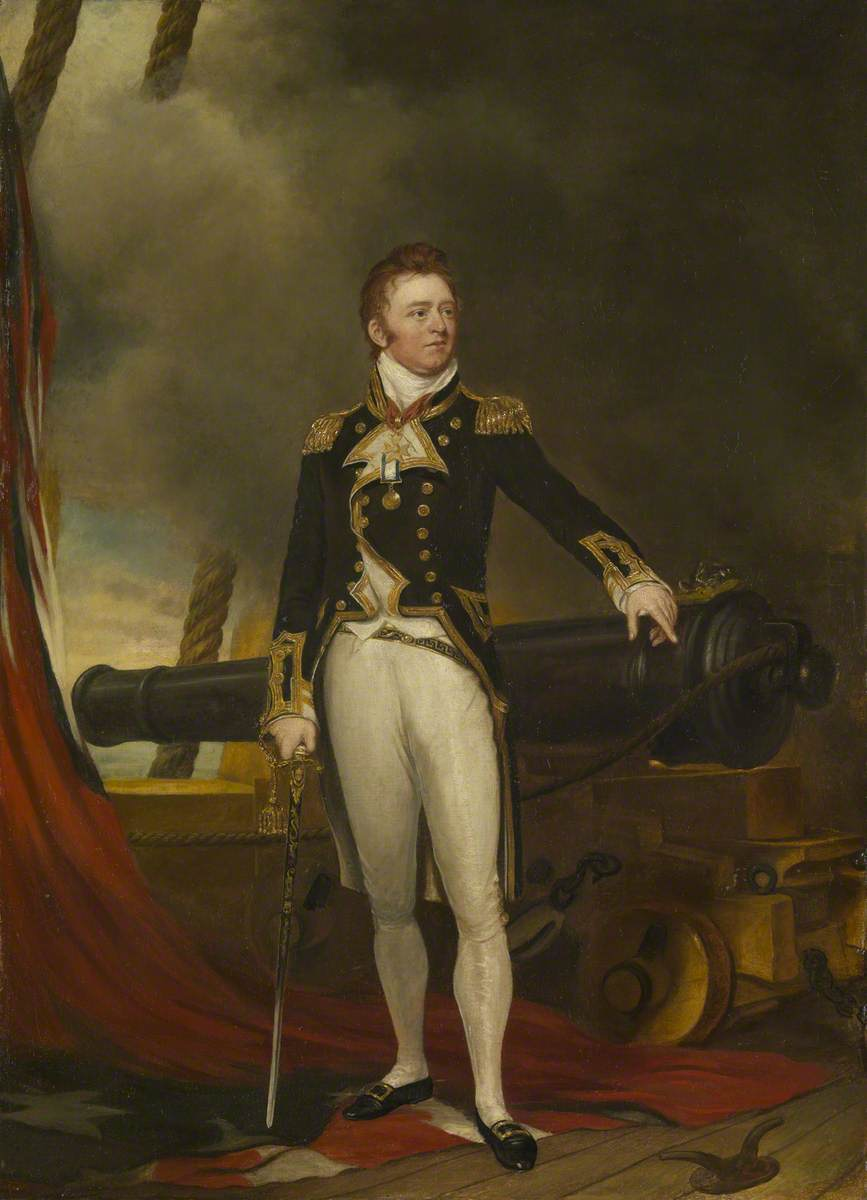
Sir Philip Broke, portrait in full-dress uniform. He is shown standing on the ensign of USS Chesapeake, in token of his victory.

The British had cleared the upper decks of American resistance, and most of Chesapeake's crew had taken refuge on the berth deck. A musket or pistol shot from the berth deck killed a British marine, William Young, who was guarding the main hatchway. The furious British crewmen then began firing through the hatchway at the Americans crowded below. Lieutenant Charles Leslie Falkiner of Shannon, the leader of the boarders who had rushed the maindeck, restored order by threatening to blow out the brains of the next person to fire. He then demanded that the Americans send up the man who had killed Young, adding that Chesapeake was taken and "We have three hundred men aboard. If there is another act of hostility you will be called up on deck one by one – and shot." Falkiner was given command of Chesapeake as a British prize-vessel.

Shannon's midshipmen during the action were Messers, Smith, Leake, Clavering, Raymond, Littlejohn and Samwell. Samwell was the only British officer other than Broke to be wounded in the action; he was to die from an infection of his wounds some weeks later. Mr Etough was the acting master, and conned the ship into the action. Shortly after Chesapeake had been secured, Broke fainted from loss of blood and was rowed back to Shannon to be attended to by the ship's surgeon.

The engagement had lasted just ten minutes according to Shannon's log, or eleven minutes by Lieutenant Wallis' watch. Broke more modestly claimed fifteen minutes in his official despatch. Shannon had lost 23 men killed, and had 56 wounded. Chesapeake had about 48 killed, including four lieutenants, the master and many other of her officers, and 99 wounded. Shannon had been hit by a total of 158 projectiles, Chesapeake by 362 (these figures include grapeshot). In the time the batteries of both ships were firing, the Americans had been exposed to 44 roundshot, whilst the British had received 10 or 11 in reply (these are figures for shot which would have produced casualties or material damage; some of Chesapeake's shot was fired low, bouncing off Shannon's side at waterline level). Even before being boarded, Chesapeake had lost the gunnery duel by a considerable margin.

A large cask of un-slaked lime was found open on Chesapeake's forecastle, and another bag of lime was discovered in the fore-top. Some British sailors alleged the intention was to throw handfuls into the eyes of Shannon's men in an unfair and dishonourable manner as they attempted to board, though that was never done by Chesapeake's crew. Albert Gleaves, historian and biographer of Lawrence, called the allegation "absurd," noting, "Lime is always carried in ship's stores as a disinfectant, and the fact that it was left on the deck after the ship was cleared for action was probably due to the neglect of a junior, or petty, officer." Gleaves, who was a decorated officer of the United States Navy, ignored the presence of a bag of lime at the top of the foremast. Martin Bibbings wrote "The presence of the lime was never fully explained by the American prisoners. Quicklime had been used up to the middle ages to blind opponents."

== Aftermath ==
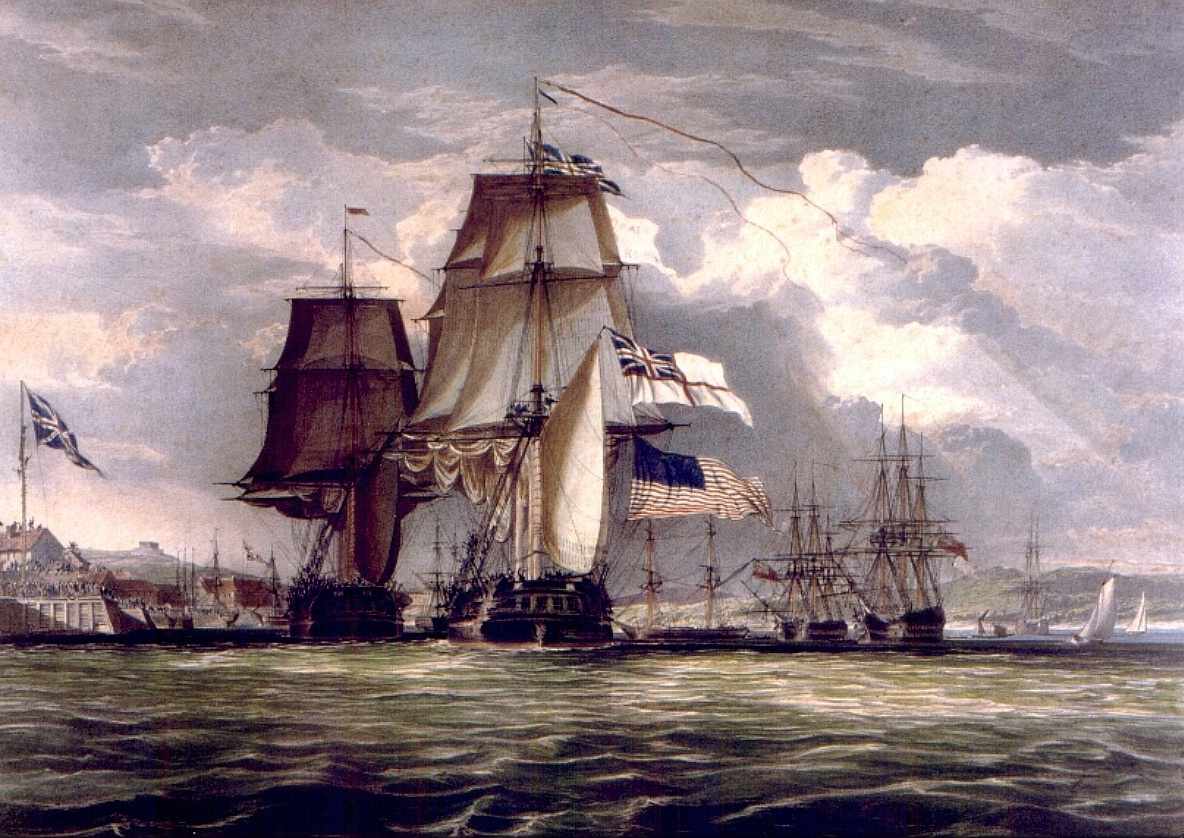
Shannon leading the captured Chesapeake into Halifax

After the victory, a prize crew was put aboard Chesapeake. The commander of the prize, Lieutenant Falkiner, had a good deal of trouble from the restive Americans, who outnumbered his own men. He had some of the leaders of the unrest transferred to Shannon in the leg-irons that had, ironically, been shipped aboard Chesapeake to deal with expected British prisoners. The rest of the American crew were rendered docile by the expedient of a carpenter cutting scuttles (holes) in the maindeck through which two 18-pounder cannon, loaded with grapeshot, were pointed at them.

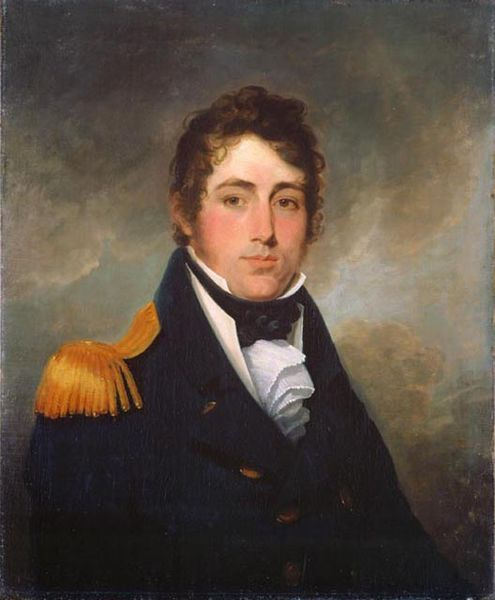
Provo Wallis commanded Shannon back to Halifax. Depicted as a commander in 1813, he later became Admiral of the Fleet.

Lieutenant Provo Wallis commanded Shannon as she escorted her prize into Halifax, arriving there on 6 June. On the entry of the two frigates into the harbour, the naval ships already at anchor manned their yards, bands played martial music and each ship Shannon passed greeted her with cheers. The 320 American survivors of the battle were interned on Melville Island in Halifax harbour. Their ship, repaired and taken into British service as HMS Chesapeake, was later used to ferry prisoners from Melville Island to England's Dartmoor Prison. Many officers were paroled to Halifax, but some began a riot at a performance of a patriotic song about Chesapeake's defeat. Parole restrictions were tightened: beginning in 1814, paroled officers were required to attend a monthly muster on Melville Island, and those who violated their parole were confined to the prison.

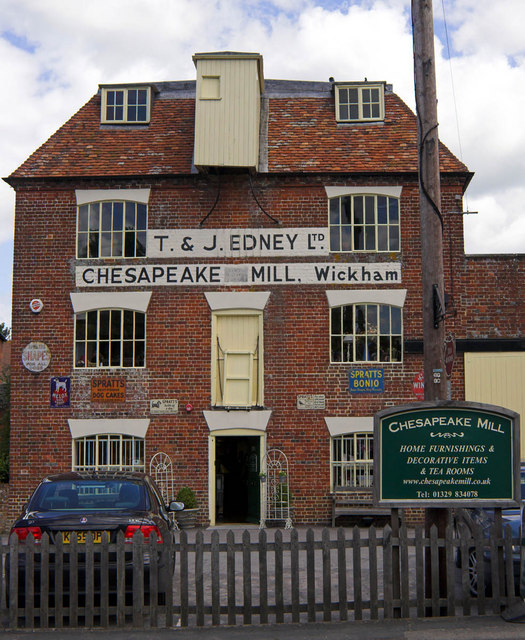
Chesapeake Mill

As the first major naval victory in the war of 1812 for the British, the capture raised the morale of the Royal Navy. After setting out on 5 September for a brief cruise under a Captain Teahouse, Shannon departed for England on 4 October, carrying the recovering Broke. They arrived at Portsmouth on 2 November. After the successful action, Lieutenants Wallis and Falkiner were promoted to the rank of commander, and Messrs. Etough and Smith were made lieutenants. Broke was made a Baronet that September. The Court of Common Council of London awarded him the freedom of the city and a sword worth 100 guineas. He also received a piece of plate worth 750 pounds and a cup worth 100 guineas. Captain Lawrence was buried in Halifax with full military honours; six British naval officers served as pallbearers. Chesapeake, after active service in the Royal Navy, was eventually sold at Portsmouth, England, for £500 in 1819 and broken up. Some of the timbers of Chesapeake were used in the construction of the Chesapeake Mill in Wickham, Hampshire. Shannon was reduced to a receiving ship in 1831, and broken up in 1859.

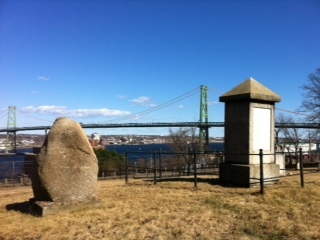
Gravestones for the casualties of Chesapeake (left) and Shannon (right), CFB Halifax, Halifax, Nova Scotia.

In the US, the capture was seen as a humiliation, and contributed to popular sentiment against the war. Many New Englanders, now calling the conflict "Madison's war" after James Madison, demanded that he resign the presidency. But while the Chesapeake was captured, Lawrence's admonition to his crew has inspired American sailors ever since.

Accounts of Shannon's victory were ascribed to many reasons. Very few of these took into account that Lawrence had rushed into a fight with an untrained and unprepared crew for what awaited him. Theodore Roosevelt would later state this plainly, lambasting former American "history writers" while doing so. In less than two minutes, Shannon's crew had taken horrible losses and did not break, while Chesapeake's crew did. Unfortunately for Lawrence, he did not meet an average British frigate of this point in the long wars, undermanned and with many men aboard who were not real seamen, but a frigate with a crew at the highest pitch of training, led by an expert in naval gunnery. Author Peter Padfield said of Shannon, that "a more destructive vessel of her force had probably never existed in the history of naval warfare".

Broke never again commanded a ship. The head wound from a cutlass blow, which had exposed the brain, had been very severe accompanied by great blood loss. Therapeutic bleeding, routinely employed at the time, was not performed by Shannon's surgeon Mr Alexander Jack, which was to Broke's advantage. The report of the surgeon described the wound as "a deep cut on the parietal bone, extending from the top of the head ... towards the left ear, [the bone] penetrated for at least three inches in length". Broke survived the wound into moderate old age (64 years), though he was debilitated. He suffered, to a greater or lesser extent, from headaches and other neurological problems for the rest of his life. The casualties were heavy: the British lost 23 killed and 56 wounded in the fighting, and the Americans lost 48 killed and 99 wounded. Twenty-three of the wounded of both sides died of their wounds in the two weeks following the action. The total 'butcher's bill' was high for an action between two frigates, but the ferocity of the fighting is emphasised by all the casualties occurring within 11 minutes. The casualty rate was an unprecedented 20 men killed or wounded every minute. As a comparison, in the action between the USS United States and HMS Macedonian the casualty rate was two per minute.

== Commemorations ==
Graves of those who died of their wounds after the battle are marked in the cemetery of the Royal Naval Dockyard, Halifax and at St. Paul's Church in Halifax. Lawrence's coffin was later reinterred from Halifax to Trinity Church Cemetery in New York City. A plaque was erected to commemorate the battle in Halifax in 1927 and may be seen at Point Pleasant Park. Shannon's bell is displayed at the Maritime Museum of the Atlantic in Halifax in an exhibit about the battle which includes a surgeon's chest and mess kettle from Chesapeake. Cannons believed to be from Shannon and Chesapeake are displayed either side of Province House, Nova Scotia's legislature.

A sister ship of HMS Shannon has been restored and preserved, HMS Trincomalee of the Leda class; she can be seen in a dock at Hartlepool in the North East of England and is the oldest British warship afloat.

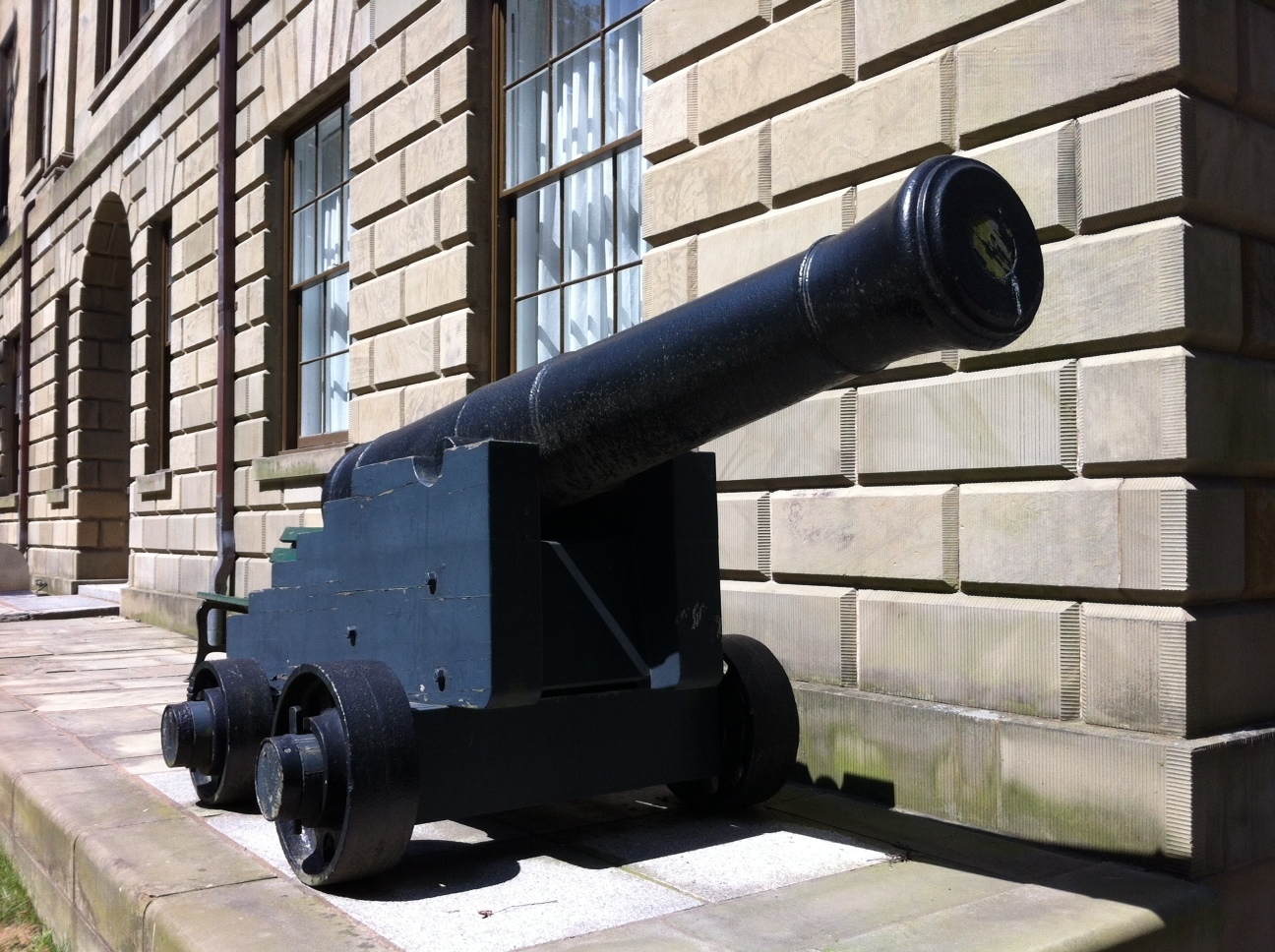
Cannon from USS Chesapeake (Province House, Nova Scotia).

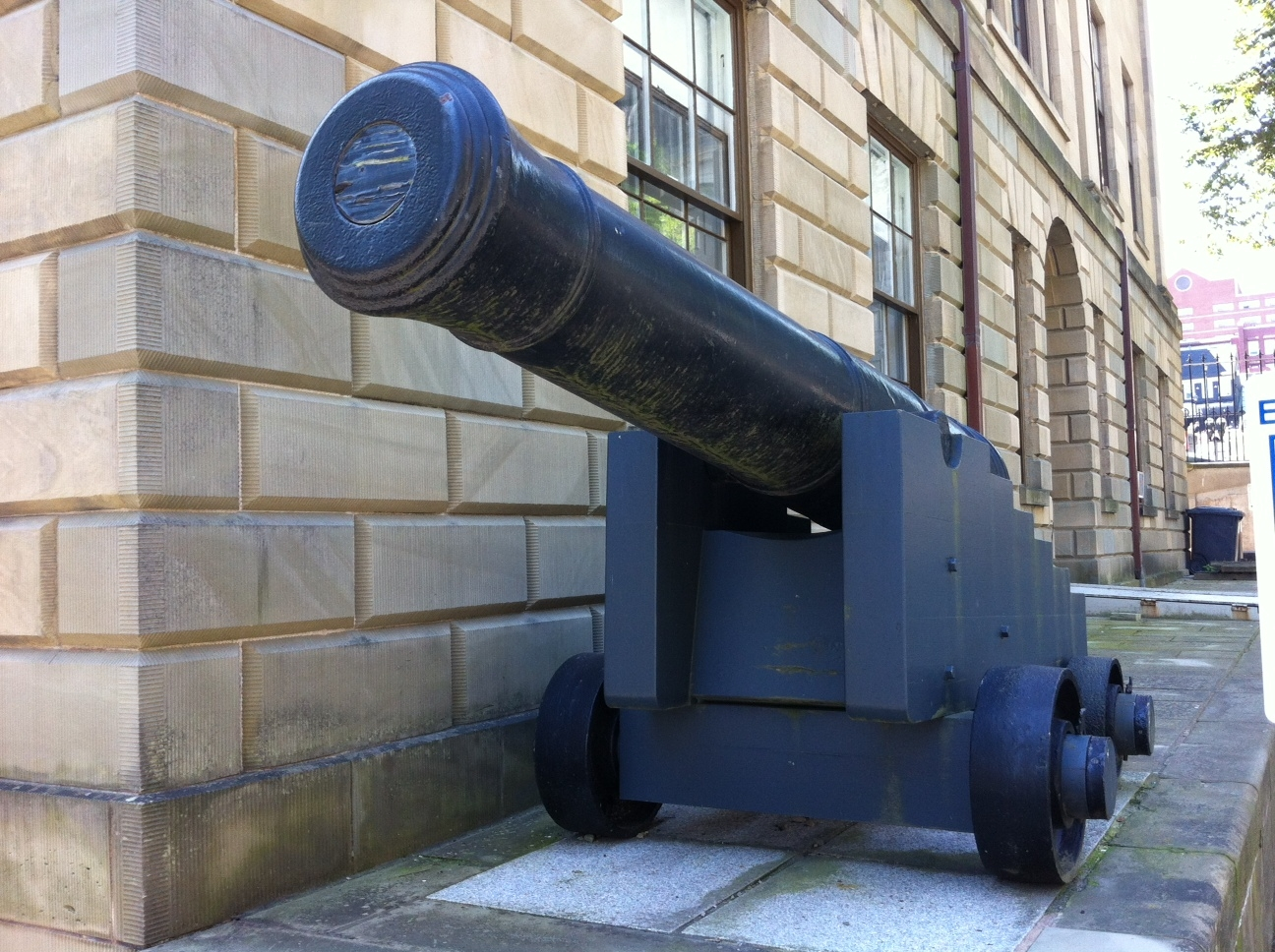
Cannon from HMS Shannon (Province House, Nova Scotia).

== In fiction ==
The capture of USS Chesapeake by HMS Shannon features prominently in The Fortune of War, the sixth book in the Aubrey–Maturin series of historical fiction novels by Patrick O'Brian, and first published in 1979. The main characters, having escaped Boston, where they were being held as prisoners of war, are on board the Shannon during the engagement. The battle is described with considerable accuracy by O'Brian, with his fictional characters playing minor roles in the action.

In the novel Anne of the Island, Canadian author Lucy Maud Montgomery illustrates the significance of the battle in Nova Scotia history when the title character finds the grave of a midshipman killed in the battle. She reflects on the excitement of the 1813 arrival of Shannon flying the "meteor flag of England” with the defeated Chesapeake carrying Lawrence's body in her wake.

== See also ==
- USRC Surveyor, captured on the same day

== Bibliography ==
- Allen, Joseph (1852). Battles of the British Navy. Vol. 2. London: Henry G. Bohn. OCLC 5852951.
- Bibbings, Martin (2013). "Chapter 10, The Battle". In Voelcker, Tim (ed.). Broke of the Shannon and the War of 1812. Barnsley: Seaforth Publishing. p. 141.
- Brighton, J. G. (1866). Admiral Sir P.B.V. Broke, Bart.: A Memoir. London: Sampson Low, Son and Marston.
- Borneman, Walter R. (2005). 1812: The War That Forged A Nation. New York: Harper Collins. ISBN 0-06-053113-4.
- Brown, Anthony G., and White, Colin (2006) The Patrick O'Brian Muster book: persons, animals, ships and cannon in the Aubrey-Maturin sea novels. McFarland & Co.
- Cray, Robert E. "Remembering the USS Chesapeake: The politics of maritime death and impressment." Journal of the Early Republic (2005) 25#3 pp: 445–474. online
- Ellis, James H. (2009). A Ruinous and Unhappy War: New England and the War of 1812. New York: Algora Publishing. ISBN 978-0-87586-690-1.
- Fowler, William M. (1984). Jack Tars and Commodores: The American Navy, 1783–1815. Boston: Houghton Mifflin. ISBN 0-395-35314-9. OCLC 10277756.
- Gardiner, Robert, ed. (1998). The Naval War of 1812. London: Chatham Publishing. ISBN 1-86176-063-9.
- Gardiner, Robert (2006). Frigates of the Napoleonic Wars. London: Chatham Publishing. ISBN 978-1-86176-292-4.
- Gleaves, Albert (1904). James Lawrence, Captain, United States Navy, Commander of the "Chesapeake". New York: G.P. Putnam's Sons. OCLC 526283.
- Hickey, Donald R (2006). Don't Give Up the Ship! Myths of the War of 1812. Montreal: Robin Brass Studio Inc. ISBN 978 0 252 03179 3.
- James, William, and Chamier, Frederick (1837) The Naval History of Great Britain, from the Declaration of War by France in 1793, to the Accession of George IV, Vol VI. Richard Bentley, London.
- Lambert, Andrew (2012) The Challenge: Britain Against America in the Naval War of 1812, Faber and Faber, London.
- Ludlow, J.M. (1862) A Sketch of the History of the United States from Independence to Secession, Macmillan and Co., London.
- Murdoch, Beamish (1867). A History of Nova Scotia. Vol. 3. Halifax: J. Barnes. OCLC 11506476.
- Padfield, Peter (1968). Broke and the Shannon. London: Hodder and Stoughton. ISBN 0-340-02511-5.
- Poolman, Kenneth (1962). Guns Off Cape Ann: The Story of the Shannon and the Chesapeake. Chicago: Rand McNally. OCLC 1384754.
- Pullen, Hugh Francis. The Shannon and the Chesapeake (Toronto: McClelland and Stewart, 1970)
- Roosevelt, Theodore (1882). The Naval War of 1812 or The History of the United States Navy during the Last War with Great Britain. New York: G.P. Putnam's Sons. OCLC 133902576.
- Shea, Iris V.; Watts, Heather (2005). Deadman's: Melville Island & Its Burial Ground. Tantallon Nova Scotia: Glen Margaret Publishers. ISBN 978-0-393-05847-5.
- Toll, Ian (2006). Six Frigates:The Epic History of the U.S. Navy. New York: Norton. ISBN 978-0-920427-68-2.
- Unger, Harlow Giles (2012). John Quincy Adams. Da Capo Press. ISBN 978-0-306-82129-5.
- Voelcker, Tim (2013) Broke of the Shannon: and the War of 1812, Seaforth Publishing ISBN 978-1473831322
- Winfield, Rif (2007). British Warships in the Age of Sail 1793–1817: Design, Construction, Careers and Fates. London: Seaforth. ISBN 978-1-86176-246-7. OCLC 181927614.
