= Churcher =

Churcher is a surname. Notable people with the surname include:

- Arthur Churcher (1871–1951), British Army officer
- Betty Churcher (1931–2015), Australian arts administrator
- Christine Churcher (born 1954), Ghanaian politician
- Harry Churcher (1910–1972), British racewalker
- John Churcher (1905–1997), British Army officer
- Peter Churcher (born 1964), Australian artist
- Richard Churcher (1659–1723), English businessman and philanthropist
- Teresa Churcher, English actress

== See also ==
- Church (disambiguation)
