= William Cox =

William Cox, Will Cox, Bill Cox, or Billy Cox may refer to:

== Arts and entertainment ==
- Bill Cox (folk musician) (1897–1968), American country and folk musician
- Billy Cox (born 1941), American bassist best known for playing with guitarist Jimi Hendrix
- Will Cox (actor), Australian actor associated with Independent Theatre, an Adelaide theatre company
- William R. Cox (1901–1988), writer of short stories and Western and mystery novels
- William Trevor (1928–2016), born William Trevor Cox, Irish novelist

== Military ==
- William Cox (British general) (1776–1864), British general of the peninsular war, in Siege of Almeida
- William Ruffin Cox (1832–1919), Confederate general in the United States Civil War, later Secretary of the United States
  - SS William R. Cox, one of three American Liberty ships
- William Reginald Cox (1905–1988), British Army officer
- William Sitgreaves Cox (1790–1874), court-martialled acting third lieutenant of the USS Chesapeake

== Law ==
- William Cox (Nova Scotia lawyer) (1921–2008), president of the Canadian Bar Association
- William Harold Cox (1901–1988), U.S. federal judge
- William John Cox (born 1941), American public interest lawyer, prosecutor, author and political activist

== Politicians ==
- William Cox (British politician) (1817–1889), member of parliament for Finsbury 1857–1859, 1861–1865
- William Cox (governor) (born 1936), known as Bill Cox, governor of the state of Tasmania, Australia
- William E. Cox (1861–1942), U.S. representative from Indiana
- William H. Cox Jr. (born 1942), American politician from Maryland
- William Hopkinson Cox (1856–1950), American politician; Lieutenant Governor of Kentucky
- William Thomas Cox (1808/1809–1877), British politician
- William Wesley Cox (1865–1948), presidential, vice presidential, and perennial U.S. Senate candidate of the Socialist Labor Party

== Sports ==
- William Samuel Cox (1831–1895), Australian racecourse owner, namesake of the Cox Plate
- Bill Cox (footballer) (1880–1915), English football centre forward
- William Cox (wrestler) (1884-1975), British Olympic wrestler
- Bill Cox (runner) (1904–1996), United States Olympic medallist
- William D. Cox (1909–1989), American businessman and sports executive
- Bill Cox (golfer) (1910–1985), author and professional golfer at Fulwell Golf Club from 1946 to 1975
- Bill Cox (baseball) (1913–1988), American Major League Baseball pitcher and Illinois state legislator
- Billy Cox (baseball) (1919–1978), American Major League Baseball middle infielder
- Bill Cox (American football) (1929–2017), former American football end
- Bill Cox (speed skater) (born 1947), American Olympic speed skater

== Others ==
- William Cox (pioneer) (1764–1837), constructor of the road across the Blue Mountains in New South Wales, Australia
- William Cox (1848–1907), engineer and inventor of the duplex slide rule (see Slide rule)
- William Denton Cox (1883–1912), heroic steward aboard RMS Titanic
- William George Cox (c. 1821–1878), Gold Commissioner for the Cariboo and Boundary Districts in the Colony of British Columbia, Canada
- William M. Cox (1942–2017), American highways administrator
- William Sands Cox (1802–1875), surgeon in Birmingham, England
- William Cox (bishop) (1921–2025), American Episcopalian bishop
- William T. L. Cox (born 1984), American social psychologist
- William T. Cox (1878–1961), American forester

== See also ==
- William Cox Ellis (1787–1871), member of the United States House of Representatives from Pennsylvania
- George William Cox (1827–1902), British historian
- William Coxe (disambiguation)
- William Cocks (disambiguation)
- William Cocke (1748–1828), American lawyer
