= Arthur Churcher =

British Army officer (1871–1951)

- Born: Arthur Ernest Churcher; 5 July 1871; Wickham, Hampshire, England
- Died: 15 February 1951 (aged 79); Windsor, Berkshire, England
- Military career
- Allegiance: United Kingdom
- Branch: British Army
- Service years: 1890–1920
- Rank: Lieutenant-Colonel
- Conflicts: Second Boer War; First World War; Kamerun campaign
- Other work: Mayor of Windsor

Lieutenant-Colonel Sir Arthur Ernest Churcher (5 July 1871 – 15 February 1951) was a British Army officer, political officer and Mayor of Windsor.

== Early life ==
Churcher was born in 1871 in Wickham, Hampshire, the son of Henry and Jeanetta Churcher and he was educated at Newbury and Crediton.

== Military life ==
Churcher joined the British Army in 1890 and served in the Second Boer War as a Quartermaster with the Imperial Yeomanry where he was wounded and returned to England in April 1902. Churcher joined the Royal West African Frontier Force as a captain and later transferred to the political department. Still in Nigeria at the start of the First World War, Churcher led a small police force to collect information about the German troop movements in neighbouring Cameroon. The small force repelled an attack by the Germans but he was wounded and returned to England. Churcher served in France until the end of the war followed by some time in Ireland before he retired in 1920.

== Political life ==
Churcher became the welfare officer of the Slough Trading Estate and was elected in 1924 to the Windsor Town Council. He also held the post of Secretary of the King Edward VII Hospital in Windsor from 1924 until 1939. Perhaps most significantly he served as Mayor of Windsor in 1935, 1936 and 1937. During 1937 on the day of the coronation of George VI Churcher was knighted as the King and Queen made a state entry into Windsor.

== Family life ==
Churcher married Edith Wyatt in 1902, and they had a son Henry Arthur (known as AJ) and daughter Phyllis. Churcher died on 15 February 1951 aged 79, his wife and daughter having pre-deceased him in 1947 and 1943 respectively.
