= SS William R. Cox =

SS William R. Cox may refer to one of three American Liberty ships named in honor of Civil War General William Ruffin Cox:

- SS William R. Cox (November 1943), United States Maritime Commission (USMC) hull number 1852 launched November 1943; transferred to the Ministry of War Transport as SS Samtweed; sold private and known as City of Newport (1947) and Istrios II (1961); scrapped in 1967
- SS William R. Cox (December 1943), USMC hull number 2406 launched December 1943; transferred to the United States Navy as USS Tuscana (AKN-3) in 1943; laid up in 1946 under William R. Cox; scrapped, 1967
- SS William Cox (December 1944), USMC hull number 2394 launched 1945; scrapped 1967
