= Wickham, Hampshire =

Village and parish in Hampshire, England

Coordinates: 50.90°N 1.19°W

Wickham
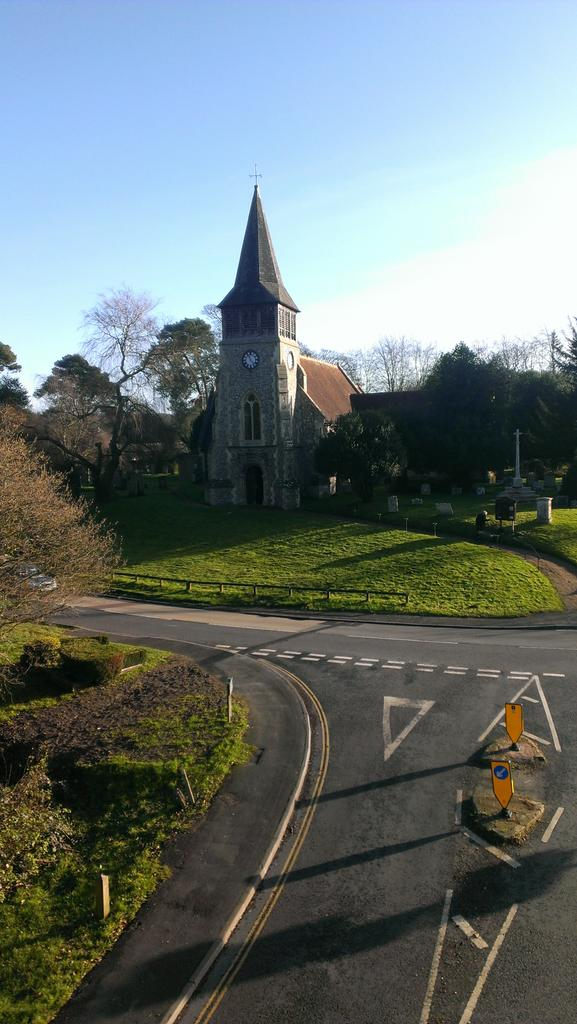
- St Nicholas’s Church in Wickham

- Location within Hampshire
- Area: 1.188 km^{2} (0.459 sq mi)
- Population: 2,173 (2021 census)
  - Density: 1,829/km^{2} (4,740/sq mi)
- OS grid reference: SU572115
- Civil parish: Wickham and Knowle
- District: Winchester
- Shire county: Hampshire
- Region: South East
- Country: England
- Sovereign state: United Kingdom
- Post town: FAREHAM
- Postcode district: PO17
- Dialling code: 01329
- Police: Hampshire and Isle of Wight
- Fire: Hampshire and Isle of Wight
- Ambulance: South Central
- UK Parliament: Fareham and Waterlooville

Wickham (/ˈwɪkəm/) is a village in the civil parish of Wickham and Knowle, in the Winchester district, in the county of Hampshire, England. It is about 3 miles north of Fareham. In 2021 it had a population of 2,173. At the 2001 census, the parish had a population of 4,816, falling to 4,299 at the 2011 Census.

Wickham has one of the oldest continuous historic market squares lined with historic buildings and is designated a conservation area. Most of the square is taken by parking spaces.

It was the fording place of the River Meon on the Roman road between Noviomagus Regnorum (Chichester) and Venta Belgarum (Winchester), and the inferred divergent point of the route to Clausentum (Bitterne). The Roman road from Wickham to Chichester is still followed today by local roads, passing behind Portsdown Hill to the north of Portsmouth Harbour and then onwards via Havant. In contrast, the route to Winchester is mostly likely lost through neglect in the Dark Ages, before present field patterns emerged.

Nearby sites have been connected to Romano-British industry, mainly pottery kilns focused around the limit of navigation of the River Hamble, near Botley, and a ford on the Clausentum road.

Wickham has been suggested as an alternative to Nursling (on the River Test) or Neatham (near Alton) for the Roman station Onna listed in the Antonine Itinerary. However, no definite location for Onna has been determined.

It was the birthplace of William of Wykeham, founder of Winchester College and New College, Oxford.

The Admiralty Shutter Telegraph Line had a station at Wickham.

The village was an intermediate station on the Meon Valley Railway, a late Victorian route, until the line closed in 1955. At one time this railway was conceived as a direct route from London to the Isle of Wight. The closed line is now established as a cycle path and bridleway along the valley of the River Meon.

A traditional gypsy horse fair is held annually every 20 May, or another day if a Sunday, in the village square.

== History ==
=== Early settlements ===
The Romans established a settlement at Wickham, on the road from the Roman centres of Chichester and Winchester. Iron works have been found northeast of the village, and various Roman finds to the southwest.

It was in Saxon Britain that the first written mention of the village appears, in a Royal Charter document dated 826. Recent excavation (1965–70) at the Manor House showed its grounds had dwellings and huts, evidence of Saxon settlement.

=== Post-Norman Conquest ===
After the Norman Conquest, King William granted the Manor of Wickham to Hugo de Port, and the village appeared in the Domesday Book of 1086, as part of the Titchfield Hundred. The present church of St Nicholas dates from 1126 and was run by the Canons of Titchfield. In 1269, King Henry III granted a charter to Roger de Scures, the Lord of The Manor at the time, for markets to be held on a Thursday. It is from this time that the layout of the village as we now know it began to emerge. Wickham also had a fair which attracted buyers and sellers from a wide area. Wickham fair (often referred to Wickham Horse Fair) is still held each year on 20 May. The Church of St Nicholas in Wickham was built in the early 12th century (although there has probably been a church on the site since the 7th century when the people of Hampshire were first converted to Christianity), however the church was largely rebuilt in the 19th century.

=== Industrialisation and Victorian Wickham ===
In the 18th century, there was a tanning industry in Wickham and in the 18th and 19th centuries a brewing industry. Both needed a supply of fresh water, which was readily available from the River Meon. In 1801, Wickham had a population of 901 and compared to most of the villages in Hampshire it was a large community. In 1820, Chesapeake Mill was built with timber taken from an American ship USS Chesapeake, which was captured in the War of 1812. Sir Richard Grindall who commanded HMS Prince at the Battle of Trafalgar is buried in Wickham churchyard.

In 1903, a branch railway was built from Fareham through Wickham, to Droxford and Alton. It was closed to passengers in 1955 and the line converted to a footpath. The original station platforms can still be found.

In 1978, Wickham was twinned with the French village of Villers-sur-Mer. Wickham Vineyard opened in 1984.

In 1990, an old brewery and village hall in Wickham were converted into flats called Riverside Mews. The brewery had shut in 1910 and the buildings were given to Wickham Parish Council to use as a village hall.

== Culture and events ==
=== Wickham Festival ===
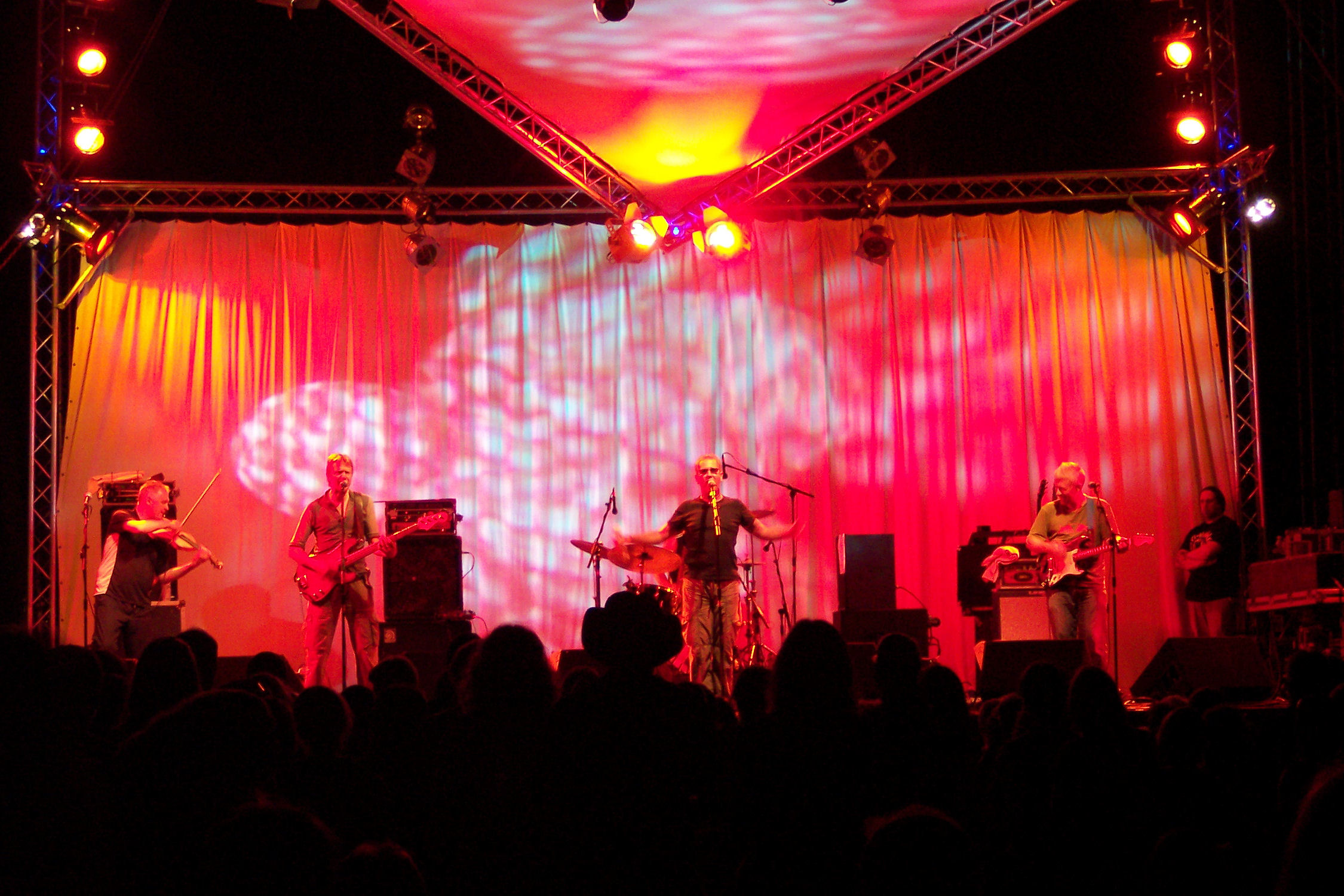
The Oysterband headlining the first Wickham Festival in 2006

Farmland north of Wickham serves as the venue for the award-winning Wickham Festival, which is an annual four-day music event. The first Wickham Festival was held from 3 to 6 August 2006 in the Community Centre and environs. Artists performing included Daby Blade from Senegal, Spiers and Boden, Los Pacaminos, Richard Thompson, Shooglenifty, Sparks, Oysterband, Fiddlers' Bid, Osibisa, Flook, Steeleye Span and The Larry Love Showband.

After briefly moving to Stokes Bay in 2008 and 2009, the festival returned to Wickham in 2010, where it has remained ever since. Wickham Festival has expanded over the years, and has featured performances from such artists as James Blunt, 10cc, Wilko Johnson, The Proclaimers, KT Tunstall, Hugh Cornwell and Lightning Seeds.

=== Taste of Wickham ===
Taste of Wickham is a food festival, first held in Wickham's medieval square in 2014. The festival offers local produce, barbecues, tasters and cookery demonstrations, and has attracted crowds of over 4,000 people to the village. Taste of Wickham returned in 2015, with increased numbers of stalls, crafts and musical displays.

=== Wickham horse fair ===
England's biggest and oldest horse fair takes place in Wickham on 20 May every year. It is one of just two major horse-trading events in the country and can trace its history back to the year 1269, making it one of the oldest fairs of this type in the UK. Ever since, crowds have gathered annually in the village to trade secrets, meet with friends and parade their stock. The fair includes bareback parades with ponies decorated with ribbons.

== Shopping ==
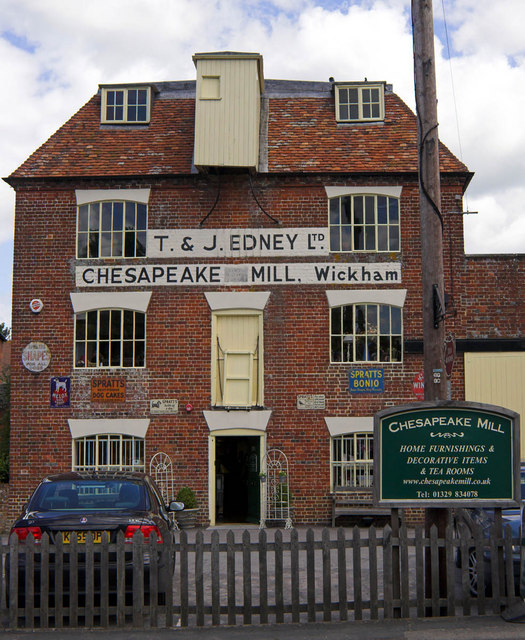
Chesapeake Mill

Wickham's village square has bars, restaurants, shops and hotels. Bay Tree Walk is a shopping walk. The Chesapeake Mill and is a former water mill built using the timbers of the USS Chesapeake, captured during the war of 1812, which is now a retail centre.

== Sport and leisure ==
Wickham has a community centre "Wickham Community Centre".

Wickham has a tennis club. The village has a public skatepark and a floodlit astroturf pitch located behind the Community Centre.

The Meon Valley Railway Line is a 17.5 km (11 mi) recreational bridleway that runs through the village. The trail follows part of the bed of the former Meon Valley Railway (Alton to Fareham), which closed in 1968. It ends at West Meon due to removal of the former viaduct across the Meon Valley, and the presence of tunnels further north.

== Wickham and Knowle civil parish ==
Known as Wickham civil parish until its name was changed in 2022 to Wickham and Knowle.

Wickham Common is an area of common land a mile south-east of Wickham village. It is a mix of grassland and woodland. Wickham Common is also the name of a hamlet on Forest Lane, south of the common.

Main roads running through the parish are the A32, the A334 and the B2177 (former A333).

== Notable people ==
- Arthur Churcher (1871–1951), British Army officer and Mayor of Windsor
- Mary Donaldson, Baroness Donaldson of Lymington – first female Lord Mayor of London.
- Amelia King, initially banned from joining the Women's Land Army because she was black, was eventually allowed to join in October 1943, and worked at Frith Farm in Wickham until 1944, living in accommodation in the village.
- Vice Admiral Thomas Revell Shivers (1751–1827)
