= William Sitgreaves Cox =

American sailor court-martialed during the War of 1812

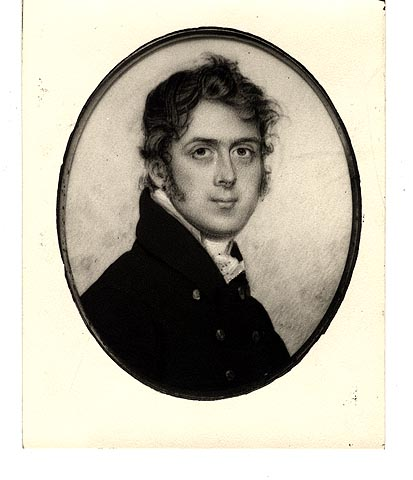
- Born: 1790; Philadelphia, Pennsylvania, U.S.
- Died: October 19, 1874 (aged 83–84)
- Allegiance: United States Navy
- Service years: 1809–1814
- Rank: Third Lieutenant
- Conflicts: War of 1812

William Sitgreaves Cox (1790–1874) was an American sailor during the War of 1812. He was serving as acting lieutenant aboard the USS Chesapeake at the time of its capture by HMS Shannon. Cox was subsequently court-martialed for his actions during that engagement and discharged from the Navy. After advocacy from his descendants, his rank was restored by President Harry S Truman.

== Early life ==
Cox was born in Philadelphia in 1790. He attended Princeton, convocating in 1808.

== Naval career ==
He joined the United States Navy in January 1809, with the rank of midshipman and was assigned to the President. Shortly thereafter he went on furlough in the East Indies, returning in 1811 with an assignment to the Argus. After the War of 1812 began, he and his commanding officer were assigned to the Hornet; when they transferred to the USS Chesapeake in 1813, Cox was named acting lieutenant.

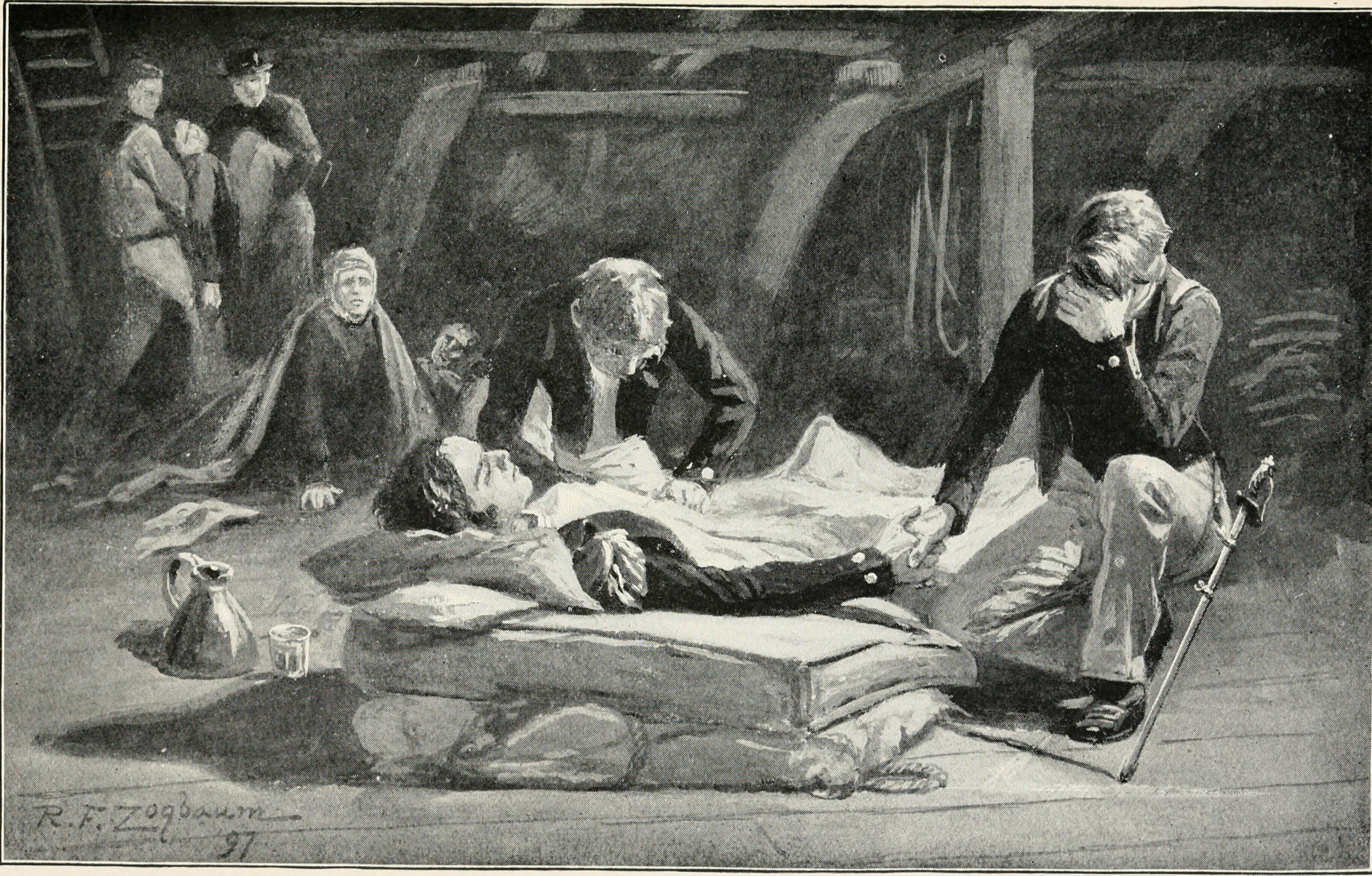
"Stay here no longer - though I would have you stay with me", Captain James Lawrence fatally injured, Cox holds his hand

During the battle with HMS Shannon in June 1813, Cox served in charge of gun crews. Captain James Lawrence was wounded, and Lt. Cox took him below deck. However, all other officers had been seriously wounded or killed, so Lawrence's incapacitation left Cox, the senior non-wounded officer, the ship's commanding officer. It is unclear whether he realized that he was now the acting commanding officer. While he was below the ship was boarded. Returning from below, Cox and Midshipman Russell saw that two 18-pounder cannon, right aft on the port side, still bore on the enemy ship. Working between them, they managed to fire both. While he was working the guns there was a rush of American seamen bent on escaping the British boarders by going down the main hatch to the safety of the berth deck. Seeing this, Lt. Cox called to them, "You damned cowardly sons of bitches! What are you jumping below for?" When asked by a nearby midshipman if he should stop them by cutting a few down, Cox replied, "No sir, it is of no use." On the Chesapeake being taken by the British he was made prisoner. After being exchanged he was promoted to third lieutenant.

He was convicted in 1814 by court-martial of dereliction of duty and unofficer-like conduct for abandoning his watch station while under fire. He was discharged from the Navy in disgrace.

== Later life ==
After his discharge, Cox briefly served as a private in the militia. He later worked as a pharmacist and a real estate broker. He and his wife, the former Elizabeth Banks, had at least two daughters and one son. Cox died on October 19, 1874.

== Legacy ==
Cox's role on the Chesapeake was mentioned by Theodore Roosevelt in his book The Naval War of 1812. In this work, Roosevelt initially stated that Cox had acted "basely"; however, he received such pushback from Cox's relatives that he removed this statement in later editions of the book and apologized.

Cox's great-grandson, the New York architect Electus D. Litchfield, campaigned for nearly 20 years to have the conviction overturned. In 1952, after passage of a resolution of Congress in support of Cox, President Harry S Truman cleared Cox's name and restored his rank.
