= Alistair Barrie =

British actor, writer and stand-up comedian

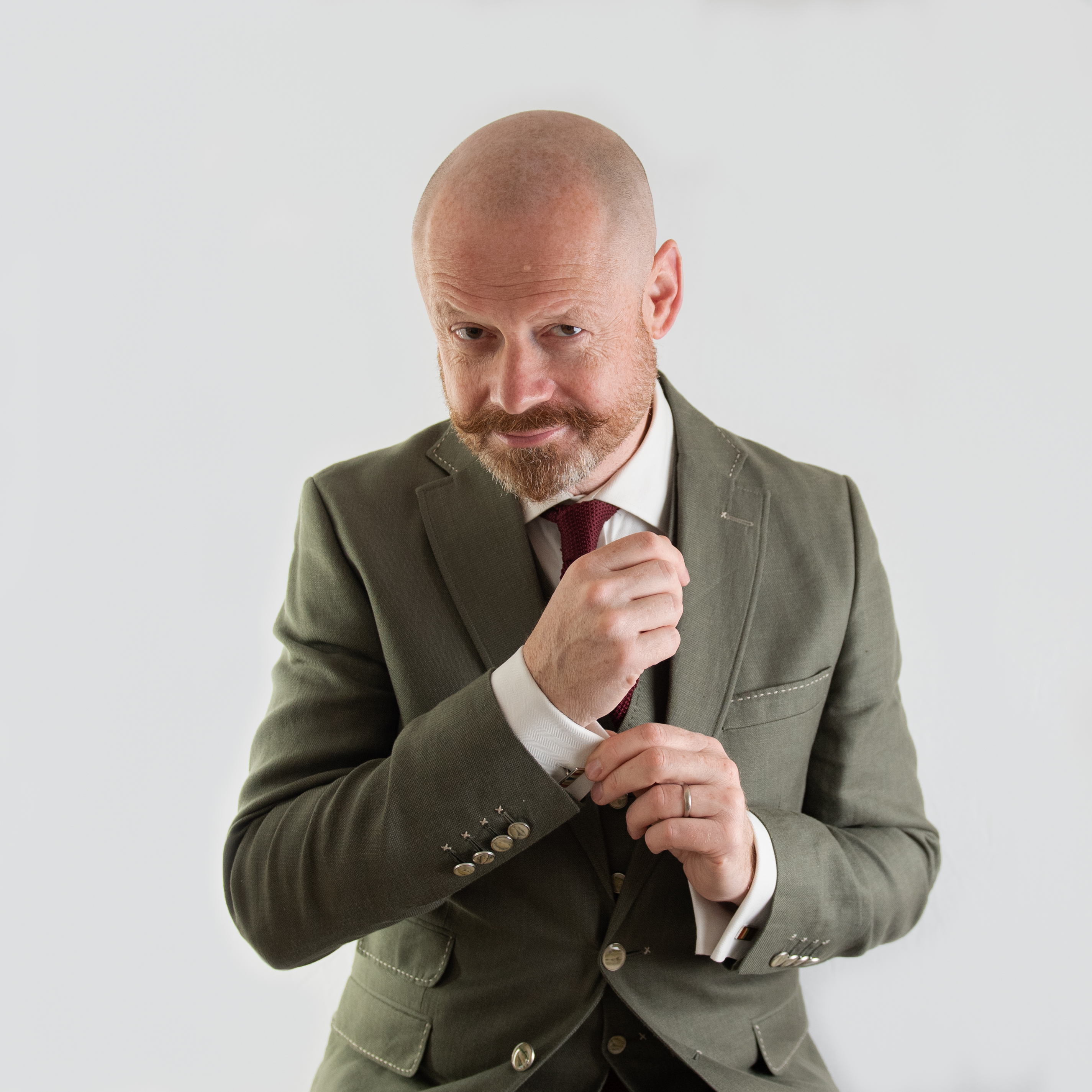
Barrie in 2022

Alistair Barrie is a British comedian, writer and actor.

Barrie is a regular performer at London's Comedy Store, located in Soho, London. Additionally, he has performed in over 40 countries, including shows in Australia, Cape Town, Mumbai, New Zealand and the Comedy Cellar in New York. Barrie has performed for international troops in Afghanistan, Cyprus and the UAE.

Barrie has performed comedy in most major UK music festivals including Glastonbury, Latitude, Bestival, and Green Man and taken several solo shows to The Edinburgh Festival. Two of his shows have been nominated for Best Show at The Fringe (Edinburgh); once in 2013 and again in 2015. Barrie's 2015 show was transferred to London for a full run at the Soho Theatre; he was also third in the Comedy Store's 2015 English Comedian of the Year competition. His 2018 show, 'The InternationAL' premiered at the 2018 Melbourne Festival and went on to Edinburgh, before selling out its entire run at the 2019 New Zealand International Comedy Festival. After a limited run sold out in 2021, Barrie returned to Edinburgh in 2022 with a new show, 'Alistaircratic'. His latest show 'Woke in Progress' premiered at the 2023 Fringe.

He is a frequent panelist on BBC Scotland’s Breaking the News and a regular pundit on Times Radio, Radio 4, and 5Live. He has appeared on numerous international radio and television shows, including Celebrity Deal or No Deal and BBC Breakfast in the UK, Good Morning South Africa in South Africa, and The Blame Game in Northern Ireland.

He has also written for various major TV and radio networks and a number of other comedians, as well as keeping a regular blog, Food Ponce, about the restaurants he visits on his travels for work.
