= William Coxe =

William Coxe is the name of:

- William Coxe (historian) (1747–1828), English historian
- William Coxe Jr. (1762–1831), U.S. Representative from New Jersey
- William Coxe (MP) for Southwark (UK Parliament constituency)

== See also ==
- William Cox (disambiguation)
