= Chesapeake Mill =

Watermill in Wickham, Hampshire, England

Coordinates: 50°54′1.1″N 1°11′5.6″W

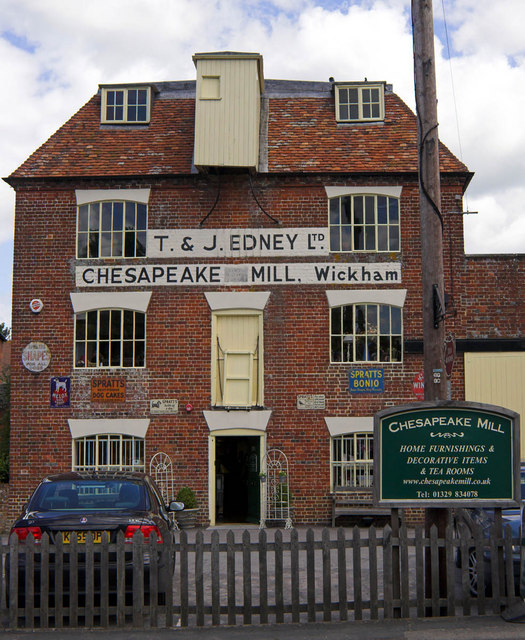
Chesapeake Mill

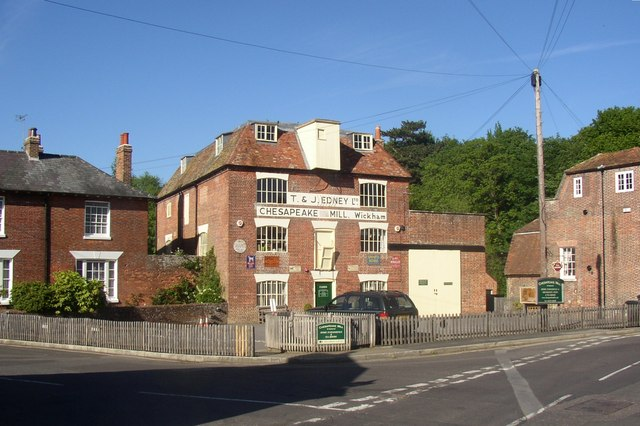
Bridge Street, Wickham, Hampshire

The Chesapeake Mill is a watermill in Wickham, Hampshire, England. The flour mill was constructed in 1820 using the timbers of HMS Chesapeake, which had previously been the United States Navy frigate USS Chesapeake. The Chesapeake was attacked and boarded by HMS Leopard on 22 June 1807. She was released but the event caused an uproar among Americans (see Chesapeake–Leopard affair). She was captured on 1 June 1813 by the Royal Navy frigate HMS Shannon during War of 1812.

In July 1819 the Commissioners of the Royal Navy put her up for sale at Plymouth. Joshua Holmes, a ship breaker in Portsmouth, purchased her for £500; he dismantled the ship and sold her timbers for £3,450. Eventually her timbers became part of the mill. Timbers from the Chesapeake were bought by John Prior, who was preparing to build a new mill at Wickham. The five main spine beams to each floor, the floor joists, the roof timbers and most of the window lintels are of American longleaf pine from the ship.

The mill remained in operation until 1976 and now serves as a retail centre for antique and gift sellers. It is a Grade II* listed building.

In 1996 a timber fragment from the Chesapeake Mill was returned to the United States; it is on display at the Hampton Roads Naval Museum in Norfolk, Virginia.

In late 2020 another piece of the original frigate was returned to the United States. It was given to the U.S. Navy's Secretary of the Navy, during his visit to England.
