= Mais qui est la belette? =

Single by Manau

from the album Panique celtique
- B-side: "Le chien du forgeron"
- Released: December 1998
- Genre: Pop rap
- Length: 3:55
- Label: Polydor
- Songwriters: Hervé Lardic; Cédric Soubiron; Martial Tricoche
- Producer: Martial Tricoche

Manau singles chronology
"Panique celtique" (1998)	"Mais qui est la belette?" (1998)	"La Confession" (1999)

"Mais qui est la belette?" is a 1998 song recorded by French hip hop act Manau. It was the third single from its album Panique celtique and was released in December 1998. It achieved success, becoming a number-one hit in France and Belgium (Wallonia), although its sales were not as high as the first single of the album, "La Tribu de Dana".

== Background and writing ==
"Mais qui est la belette?" ("But who is the weasel?") is an adaptation of a popular song from Brittany named "La Jument de Michao", covered in a rap Celtic version. The refrain is the same as that of the original song, namely the lyrics 'J'entends le loup, le renard et la belette' ('I hear the wolf, the fox and the weasel'), but the verses and the title are changed.

== Chart performance ==
In France, "Mais qui est la bellette?" debuted at number six on 19 December 1998 and peaked at number one four weeks later. It remained for 12 weeks in the top ten, 19 weeks in the top 50 and 23 weeks on the chart (top 100). In Belgium (Wallonia), the song charted for 22 weeks in the top 40, ten of them in the top five. It started at number 34 on 26 December 1998, entered the top ten the week after, and topped the chart from the fifth to the eighth week. Thereafter, it did not stop to drop on the chart.

Manau performed the song live on the French TV show Sol en Cirque, aired on France 2, on 24 December 2005.

== Track listings ==
- CD single
1. "Mais qui est la belette ?" (remix) — 3:55
2. "Le Chien du forgeron" — 4:23
- 12" maxi
1. "Mais qui est la belette ?" (remix) — 3:55
2. "Mais qui est la belette ?" (original version) — 3:58

== Charts ==
=== Weekly charts ===
Chart (1999)	Peak position
Belgium (Ultratop 50 Wallonia)	1
France (SNEP)	1

=== Year-end charts ===
Chart (1999)	Position
Belgium (Ultratop 50 Wallonia)	24
Europe (Eurochart Hot 100)	55
France (SNEP)	24

== Certifications ==
Region	Certification	Certified units/sales
Belgium (BRMA)	Platinum	30,000^{*}
France (SNEP)	Gold	250,000^{*}
^{*} Sales figures based on certification alone.
