= List of number-one singles of 1998 (France) =

This is a list of the French SNEP Top 100 Singles & Top 75 Albums number-ones of 1998.

== Number-ones by week ==
=== Singles Chart ===
Week	Issue Date	Artist	Single
1	January 3	Andrea Bocelli and Hélène Ségara	"Vivo per lei"
2	January 10	Andrea Bocelli and Hélène Ségara	"Vivo per lei"
3	January 17	Andrea Bocelli and Hélène Ségara	"Vivo per lei"
4	January 24	Andrea Bocelli and Hélène Ségara	"Vivo per lei"
5	January 31	Andrea Bocelli and Hélène Ségara	"Vivo per lei"
6	February 7	Céline Dion	"The Reason"/"My Heart Will Go On"
7	February 14	Céline Dion	"The Reason"/"My Heart Will Go On"
8	February 21	Céline Dion	"The Reason"/"My Heart Will Go On"
9	February 28	Céline Dion	"The Reason"/"My Heart Will Go On"
10	March 7	Céline Dion	"The Reason"/"My Heart Will Go On"
11	March 14	Céline Dion	"The Reason"/"My Heart Will Go On"
12	March 21	Céline Dion	"The Reason"/"My Heart Will Go On"
13	March 28	Céline Dion	"The Reason"/"My Heart Will Go On"
14	April 4	Céline Dion	"The Reason"/"My Heart Will Go On"
15	April 11	Céline Dion	"The Reason"/"My Heart Will Go On"
16	April 18	Céline Dion	"The Reason"/"My Heart Will Go On"
17	April 25	Céline Dion	"The Reason"/"My Heart Will Go On"
18	May 2	Céline Dion	"The Reason"/"My Heart Will Go On"
19	May 9	Ricky Martin	"La Copa de la Vida"
20	May 16	Ricky Martin	"La Copa de la Vida"
21	May 23	Ricky Martin	"La Copa de la Vida"
22	May 30	Ricky Martin	"La Copa de la Vida"
23	June 6	Ricky Martin	"La Copa de la Vida"
24	June 13	Ricky Martin	"La Copa de la Vida"
25	June 20	Manau	"La Tribu de Dana"
26	June 27	Manau	"La Tribu de Dana"
27	July 4	Manau	"La Tribu de Dana"
28	July 11	Manau	"La Tribu de Dana"
29	July 18	Manau	"La Tribu de Dana"
30	July 25	Manau	"La Tribu de Dana"
31	August 1	Manau	"La Tribu de Dana"
32	August 8	Manau	"La Tribu de Dana"
33	August 15	Manau	"La Tribu de Dana"
34	August 22	Manau	"La Tribu de Dana"
35	August 29	Manau	"La Tribu de Dana"
36	September 5	Manau	"La Tribu de Dana"
37	September 12	Daniel Lavoie, Patrick Fiori & Garou	"Belle"
38	September 19	Daniel Lavoie, Patrick Fiori & Garou	"Belle"
39	September 26	Daniel Lavoie, Patrick Fiori & Garou	"Belle"
40	October 3	Daniel Lavoie, Patrick Fiori & Garou	"Belle"
41	October 10	Daniel Lavoie, Patrick Fiori & Garou	"Belle"
42	October 17	Daniel Lavoie, Patrick Fiori & Garou	"Belle"
43	October 24	Daniel Lavoie, Patrick Fiori & Garou	"Belle"
44	October 31	Daniel Lavoie, Patrick Fiori & Garou	"Belle"
45	November 7	Daniel Lavoie, Patrick Fiori & Garou	"Belle"
46	November 14	Daniel Lavoie, Patrick Fiori & Garou	"Belle"
47	November 21	Daniel Lavoie, Patrick Fiori & Garou	"Belle"
48	November 28	Daniel Lavoie, Patrick Fiori & Garou	"Belle"
49	December 5	Daniel Lavoie, Patrick Fiori & Garou	"Belle"
50	December 12	Daniel Lavoie, Patrick Fiori & Garou	"Belle"
51	December 19	Daniel Lavoie, Patrick Fiori & Garou	"Belle"
52	December 26	Daniel Lavoie, Patrick Fiori & Garou	"Belle"

=== Albums Chart ===
Week	Issue Date	Artist	Title
1	3 January	Céline Dion	Let's Talk About Love
2	10 January	Alain Bashung	Fantaisie militaire
3	17 January	Titanic	La bande originale
4	24 January	Titanic	La bande originale
5	31 January	Titanic	La bande originale
6	7 February	Titanic	La bande originale
7	14 February	Titanic	La bande originale
8	21 February	Titanic	La bande originale
9	28 February	Titanic	La bande originale
10	7 March	Titanic	La bande originale
11	14 March	Titanic	La bande originale
12	21 March	Titanic	La bande originale
13	28 March	Titanic	La bande originale
14	4 April	Titanic	La bande originale
15	11 April	Titanic	La bande originale
16	18 April	Titanic	La bande originale
17	25 April	Suprême NTM	Suprême NTM
18	2 May	Suprême NTM	Suprême NTM
19	9 May	Pascal Obispo	Live 98
20	16 May	Garbage	Version 2.0
21	23 May	Louise Attaque	Louise Attaque
22	30 May	Shurik'n	Où je vis
23	6 June	The Smashing Pumpkins	Adore
24	13 June	Louise Attaque	Louise Attaque
25	20 June	Louise Attaque	Louise Attaque
26	27 June	Louise Attaque	Louise Attaque
27	4 July	Louise Attaque	Louise Attaque
28	11 July	Louise Attaque	Louise Attaque
29	18 July	Louise Attaque	Louise Attaque
30	25 July	Manau	Panique celtique
31	1 August	Manau	Panique celtique
32	8 August	Manau	Panique celtique
33	15 August	Louise Attaque	Louise Attaque
34	22 August	Louise Attaque	Louise Attaque
35	29 August	Louise Attaque	Louise Attaque
36	5 September	Céline Dion	S'il suffisait d'aimer
37	12 September	Céline Dion	S'il suffisait d'aimer
38	19 September	Céline Dion	S'il suffisait d'aimer
39	26 September	Céline Dion	S'il suffisait d'aimer
40	3 October	Notre Dame de Paris	Notre Dame de Paris
41	10 October	Notre Dame de Paris	Notre Dame de Paris
42	17 October	Notre Dame de Paris	Notre Dame de Paris
43	24 October	Notre Dame de Paris	Notre Dame de Paris
44	31 October	Notre Dame de Paris	Notre Dame de Paris
45	7 November	Notre Dame de Paris	Notre Dame de Paris
46	14 November	Notre Dame de Paris	Notre Dame de Paris
47	21 November	Notre Dame de Paris	Notre Dame de Paris
48	28 November	Sidaction	Ensemble 98
49	5 December	Sidaction	Ensemble 98
50	12 December	Notre Dame de Paris	Notre Dame de Paris
51	19 December	Notre Dame de Paris	Notre Dame de Paris
52	26 December	Notre Dame de Paris	Notre Dame de Paris

== Top Ten Best Sales ==
This is the ten best-selling singles and albums in 1998.

=== Singles ===
Pos.	Artist	Title
1	Daniel Lavoie, Patrick Fiori & Garou	"Belle"
2	Manau	"La Tribu de Dana"
3	Céline Dion	"My Heart Will Go On"
4	Lââm	"Chanter pour ceux qui sont loin de chez eux"
5	Nomads	"Yakalelo"
6	Hermes House Band	"I Will Survive"
7	Brandy & Monica	"The Boy Is Mine"
8	Ménélik & Imane D	"Bye bye"
9	Ricky Martin	"La Copa De La Vida"
10	Des'ree	"Life"

=== Albums ===
Pos.	Artist	Title
1	Louise Attaque	Louise Attaque
2	Notre Dame de Paris	Notre Dame de Paris
3	Manu Chao	Clandestino
4	Céline Dion	S'il suffisait d'aimer
5	Titanic	La bande originale
6	Manau	Panique celtique
7	Madonna	Ray of Light
8	Zebda	Essence ordinaire
9	Lauryn Hill	The Miseducation of Lauryn Hill
10	Suprême NTM	Suprême NTM

== See also ==
- 1998 in music
- List of number-one singles in France
- List of artists who reached number one on the French Singles Chart
