= Tri Martolod =

Traditional Breton song

Song
- Published: 1700s
- Genre: traditional Breton

Tri Martolod ("Three sailors" in Breton) or Tri Martolod Yaouank ("Three young sailors"), is a traditional Breton song which dates to the 18th century in Lower Brittany. It was made famous by the interpretation, the arrangement and the recordings made by the Breton harpist Alan Stivell, in the 1970s.

The lyrics tell the story of three young sailors who embark for Newfoundland and the history quickly settles into a romantic dialogue. The music is a round in three steps typical of the South Cornouaille and common in the Breton coastal areas.

== Performers ==
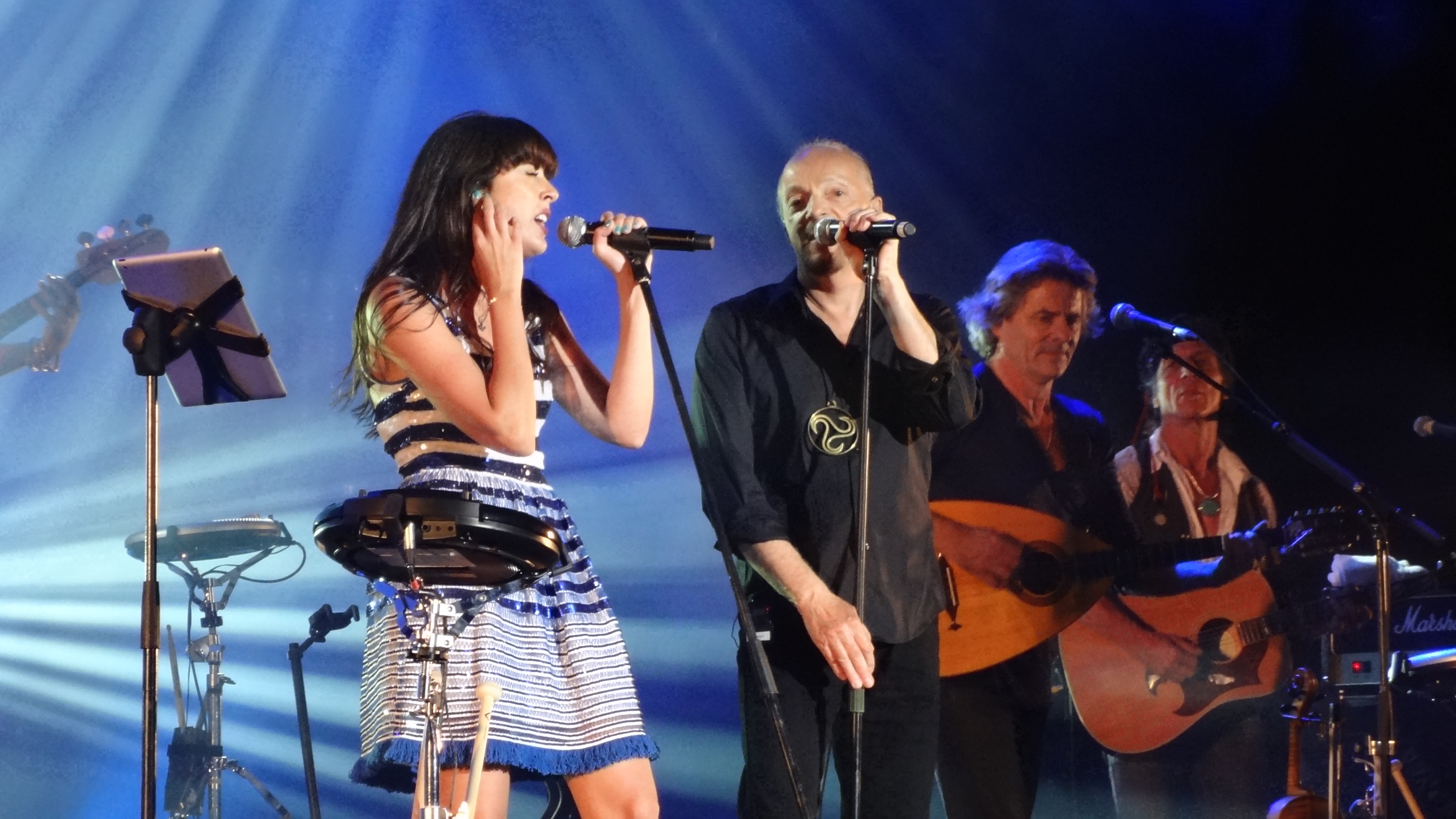
Nolwenn Leroy and Alan Stivell duo in 2012.

- Zaïg Monjarret (An tri-ugent martolod)
- Alan Stivell (live À l'Olympia in 1972, single, Again in 1993)
- Tri Yann (Tri Yann an Naoned, 1972)
- Deep Forest (Dao Dezi, 1994)
- Yann-Fañch Kemener (with Didier Squiban, 1995)
- Micamac (Breton folk band, album Froggy Dew, 1999)
- Shannon (Polish band, 2000)
- Gérard Jaffrès (Belgian singer, album Viens dans ma maison, 2003)
- Claire Pelletier (Quebec singer, En concert au St-Denis, 2003)
- Arany Zoltán (2009)
- Nolwenn Leroy (album Bretonne, 2010)
- Les Marins d'Iroise (2011)
- Santiano (German band, 2011)
- Dunkelschön (German band, album Zauberwort, 2011)
- Alexandrov Ensemble (2012)
- Restless feet, Almost Irish (2013)
- Faitissa (album Terra aviatica, 2014)
- MystTerra (Russian metal band)(2015)
- Annwn (album Enaid, 2016)
- Metal Cambra, 10th Anniversari Album, 2019 (Band from the Catalan Countries)
- Kick Your Heart (metal band from Hungary)(2019)
- Dr Peacock - Tri Martolod (Frenchcore Hardstyle Genre - 2020)
- The Longest Johns, Contre vents et marées (Between Wind and Water re-release with additional French shanties, 2021)
- Joshua Burnell (album Songs From The Seasons II, 2022)
- The London Sea Shanty Collective (in translation as Three Breton Mariners)

=== Other songs ===
Other songs on the same musical air:

- Danish band Lars Lilholt Band "Et folk, Et menneske" ("One People, One man") Danish lyrics by Lars Lilholt (2012)
- French band Manau, La Tribu de Dana ("Tuatha Dé Danann", about a Celtic warrior tribe, 1998)
- Polish band Ryczące Shannon (album Ryczące Shannon Project, 2005)
- Russian band Nachalo Veka (НАЧАЛО ВЕКА) feat. harpist Hellavis (Хелависа), "I Waited You" ("Тебя Ждала") (single "Tebya Jdala" 2008, album "Formy Vremeny" 2010)
- Irish singer Méav Ní Mhaolchatha sings this song in English as titled "Once You Were My Lover". (album The Calling, 2013)
- Olli & the Bollywood Orchestra, Teen Aazaad Naavik (album Olli goes to Bollywood, 2013)
- Swiss band Eluveitie, Inis Mona (album Slania, about the Gallish Wars and related to De Bello Gallico by Julius Caesar, 2008) Additionally, Celtos (album Origins, focusing on Gaulish folklore, 2014) and Ogmios (album Evocation II: Pantheon, 2017)
- Brazilian band Terra Celta, "O Quadrado" (album Folkatrua, 2010)
- Montenegrin song Ovo je naša zemlja, Sergej Ćetković & Danijel Popović (2009)
- Dutch hardstyle DJ and producer Adaro, "Flame Up High" (2018)
- Dutch frenchcore DJ and producer Dr. Peacock, "Tri Martolod" (2020)
- DJ Bens, Dadinho, Kofs and RK, "Dans la cité" (2022)
- Michael Patrick Kelly, "K.H.A." (from album "Traces", 2025)

== Lyrics ==
Breton

Tri martolod yaouank... la la la... Tri martolod yaouank i vonet da veajiñ

E vonet da veajiñ, gê! E vonet da veajiñ

Gant 'n avel bet kaset... la la la... Gant 'n avel bet kaset betek an Douar Nevez

Beteg an Douar Nevez, gê! Beteg an Douar Nevez

E-kichen mein ar veilh... la la la... E-kichen mein ar veilh o deus mouilhet o eorioù

O deus mouilhet o eorioù, gê! O deus mouilhet o eorioù

Hag e-barzh ar veilh-se... la la la... Hag e-barzh ar veilh-se e oa ur servijourez

E oa ur servijourez, gê! E oa ur servijourez

Hag e c'houlenn ganin... la la la... Hag e c'houlenn ganin pelec'h 'n eus graet konesañs

Pelec'h 'n eus graet konesañs, gê! Pelec'h 'n eus graet konesañs

E Naoned er marc'had... la la la... E Naoned er marc'had hor boa choazet ur walenn

English

Three young sailors... la la la… Three young sailors went traveling

Went traveling! Went traveling

And the wind pushed them… la la la... The wind pushed them to Newfoundland

All the way to Newfoundland! All the way to Newfoundland

Next to the windmill stone… la la la... Next to the windmill stone, they dropped anchor

They dropped anchor! They dropped anchor

And in that windmill… la la la... And in that windmill was a servant girl

There was a servant girl! There was a servant girl

And she asked me… la la la... And she asked me where we met

Where have we met before? Where have we met before

In Nantes at the market… la la la... In Nantes at the market, we chose a ring

== Links ==
- Alan Stivell, live 2000, live Olympia 2012
- Nolwenn Leroy, live 2011
