= La Jument de Michao =

Breton adaptation of a French folk song

La Jument de Michao ("Michao's mare" in French) or Le Loup, le Renard et la Belette ("The Wolf, the Fox and the Weasel") is a recent (1973) Breton adaptation of two different Western French traditional songs, also found in Brittany, the original one may be a medieval French song of Burgundy origin: J'ai vu le loup, le renard, le lièvre. The integration in the Breton patrimony was made under the shape of a song deduct (ten to one couplet) typical of Upper Brittany (in Gallo language), but in other French regions too. The music dances on the rhythm of the An dro (Gwened), one of the most known Breton round dances.

It is about a parody of liturgical Dies Irae, with origins in the fifteenth century in the country of Beaune and of which there are numerous variants in the French regions.

The lyrics talk about the mare of Michao (Gallo for Michael) who ate all the hay and will not pass winter; they are blended with references to other animals (wolf, fox and weasel).

== Lyrics ==
French

C'est dans dix ans je m'en irai
J'entends le loup et le renard chanter

J'entends le loup, le renard et la belette
J'entends le loup et le renard chanter

C'est dans neuf ans je m'en irai
La jument de Michao a passé dans le pré

La jument de Michao et son petit poulain
A passé dans le pré et mangé tout le foin

L'hiver viendra les gars, l'hiver viendra
La jument de Michao, elle s'en repentira

...

English

In ten years, I'll go away
I hear the wolf and the fox singing

I hear the wolf, the fox and the weasel
I hear the wolf and the fox singing

In nine years, I'll go away
Michao's mare went through the meadow

Michao's mare and its little foal
Went through the meadow and ate up all the hay

Winter will come, guys, winter will come
Michao's mare will regret it

...

== Records ==
- Kouerien (1973)
- Tri Yann (1976, La Découverte ou l'Ignorance)
- Dao Dezi (1994)
- Gérard Jaffrès (2003, Viens dans ma maison)
- Saltatio Mortis (2009, Wer Wind sät)
- Les Ramoneurs de Menhirs (2010, Amzer An Dispac'h)
- Nolwenn Leroy (2010, Bretonne)
- Eluveitie (2012, Luxtos, album Helvetios)
- Laïs (2002, "Le renard et la belette", album "Dorothea")
- Omnia (2016, Wolf An Dro , album Prayer)
- dArtagnan (2024, album Herzblut)

=== Adaptations ===
- Manau (1998, Mais qui est la belette ?)
- Gilles Servat (2011, La Manju de Chomi, album Ailes et îles)
- Les Enfoirés (2012, Le Bal des Enfoirés)
- Eluveitie (2012, Luxtos, Helvetios album)
- dArtagnan (2024, König der Korsaren, album Herzblut)

== See also ==
- J'ai vu le loup

== Links ==
- Tri Yann, Live La jument de Michao, 1999
- Nolwenn Leroy, Clip La jument de Michao, 2010
