= The Leaving of Liverpool =

Traditional song

"(The) Leaving of Liverpool" (Roud 9435), also known as "Fare Thee Well, My Own True Love", is a folk song. Folklorists classify it as a lyrical lament and it was also used as a sea shanty, especially at the capstan. It is very well known in Britain, Ireland, and America, despite the fact that it was collected only twice, from the Americans Richard Maitland and Captain Patrick Tayluer. It was collected from both singers by William Main Doerflinger, an American folk song collector particularly associated with sea songs in New York. The song's narrator laments his long sailing trip to California and the thought of leaving his loved ones (especially his "own true love"), pledging to return to her one day.

"The Leaving of Liverpool" has been recorded by many popular folk singers and groups since the 1950s. The Clancy Brothers and Tommy Makem had a top 10 hit with the song in Ireland in 1964. The song has also been adapted by several artists, most notably The Dubliners and The Pogues.

== History ==
=== Origins ===
According to Library of Congress editor Stephen Winick, "The Leaving of Liverpool" was first collected by Doerflinger from Maitland, whose repertoire he recorded at Sailors' Snug Harbor in Staten Island from 1938 to 1940. At the time, Doerflinger was an independent collector, recording the songs of sailors and lumbermen out of personal interest. In early 1942, Doerflinger found another version sung by a retired sailor named Patrick Tayluer, who was living at the Seamen's Church Institute at the South Street Seaport in Manhattan. This time, he borrowed equipment and blank discs from the Library of Congress with the understanding that he would deposit the recordings there.

The two versions are quite different, and the singers gave different accounts of the song. Maitland said he learned "The Leaving of Liverpool" from a Liverpudlian on board the General Knox around 1885. His version has the narrator leave Liverpool to be a professional sailor aboard a historical clipper ship, the David Crockett, under a real-life captain, Captain Burgess. This would date his version to between 1863, when John A. Burgess first sailed the David Crockett out of Liverpool, and 1874, when Burgess died at sea. He also told Doerflinger that on his voyages it was sung as an off-watch song, or forebitter, rather than a sea shanty.

Tayluer did not say exactly when he learned the song, but he was at sea by 1870, and Doerflinger generally thought his songs were older than Maitland's. Tayluer did say that he believed the song originated during the Gold Rush, in 1849, and that it concerned a person leaving Liverpool to strike it rich in California and then return. Tayluer's version mentions neither the David Crockett nor Captain Burgess. Finally, Tayluer is quite explicit in describing the work that was done by the men as they sang the song, making it unmistakably a sea shanty sung at the capstan, and this was duly noted by Doerflinger, who wrote "The Leaving of Liverpool (Capstan Shanty Version)" in his notes on the recording.

Liverpool was a natural point of embarkation for such a song because it had the necessary shipping lines and a choice of destinations and infrastructure, including special emigration trains directly to The Prince's Landing Stage (which is mentioned in the song's first line). Whether intending to go as a professional sailor (as in Maitland's song) or a migrant worker (as in Tayluer's), Liverpool was a common port from which to leave England.

=== Field recordings ===
After recording Tayluer, Doerflinger duly shipped the recordings and the recording machine back to the Library of Congress, but several discs were broken or lost, including the one that contained "The Leaving of Liverpool." He made it clear in his correspondence that he considered it one of the most important songs in the collection. Therefore, he collected it from Tayluer a second time, this time on a dictaphone cylinder, the only technology he could borrow at short notice. The Library of Congress's recording of this song is therefore on a cylinder rather than a disc. It resides in the archive of the American Folklife Center, where it can be heard by the general public during reading room hours.

Doerflinger's disc recordings of Maitland were made without the help of the Library of Congress and therefore remained in his personal collection. Although he later loaned his recordings of Maitland to the Library of Congress for duplication, for some reason he held back "The Leaving of Liverpool", so it remained in his private possession and passed to his family on his death. No copies have emerged, and no one has heard the recording since Doerflinger himself transcribed it.

=== Folk revival ===
After recording Tayluer, Doerflinger served for several years in World War II. On his return, he ordered copies of his discs from the Library of Congress, but forgot that some of Tayluer's songs were on cylinders. Therefore, he did not have these recordings available in preparing his book, Shantymen and Shantyboys, which was published in 1951. The book consequently presents only Maitland's version of the song, which became the origin of all folk revival versions.

The song was first brought into the folk revival by Ewan MacColl, who learned it from Doerflinger's book and recorded it on the album A Sailor's Garland, produced by American folklorist Kenny Goldstein for the Prestige International label in 1962. That album featured Louis Killen as an accompanist and backup singer, so he learned the song for the album. Killen soon decided to perform it himself, and recorded it in 1963. He also taught it to his friend Luke Kelly. Kelly in turn taught it to the folk group The Dubliners and the singer Liam Clancy of The Clancy Brothers, who were then living and working in America. In 1964, both The Dubliners and The Clancy Brothers (with Tommy Makem) recorded their versions, making it very popular in the Irish music scene in both Ireland and the United States. The Clancy Brothers version reached #6 on the Irish singles chart. In 1966, the Liverpool group The Spinners recorded it, making it a revival standard in England as well. It has since become one of the most popular songs in the revival, and has been performed and recorded by dozens of artists.

== Recordings ==
It has been recorded by:

- Fiddler's Green (2016)
- The Corries
- Ewan MacColl
- Roger Whittaker 1989
- Steve Tilston (2005) on the album Of Many Hands - From The Tradition
- Louis Killen
- The Spinners (1966)
- The Dubliners
- The Clancy Brothers and Tommy Makem, 1964 single and on their album, The First Hurrah!
- The Seekers, 1965 single and on their 1965 album, A World of Our Own
- The Pogues
- Emscherkurve 77 as "Komma hier bei uns im Ruhrpott hin" in German on their 2003 Split Album with the Hudson Falcons
- Tommy Fleming,
- Gaelic Storm, on their self-titled album from 1998
- Young Dubliners on the 2007 album With All Due Respect - The Irish Sessions
- Patrick Clifford, on American Wake
- The High Kings, on the 2010 album Memory Lane
- Marc Gunn & Jamie Haeuser on How America Saved Irish Music
- Billy Brown (1974)
- Scaffold (1975)
- Pat Nelson
- The Roadrunners (1965)
- The Bill Rayner Four (1975)
- Dan Zanes on Sea Music (2003)
- Bounding Main on their 2008 album Going Overboard (2008).
- Shane MacGowan on Son of Rogues Gallery: Pirate Ballads, Sea Songs & Chanteys (2013)
- Johnny McEvoy on The Basement Sessions (2014)
- The Fisherman's Friends on Sole Mates (2018)
- Nelson's Shantymen on Land and Sea (2020)
- The Longest Johns on Voyage.

== Adaptations ==
The tune was adapted by Bob Dylan in January 1963, retitled simply as "Farewell", a variation which was finally released on The Bootleg Series Vol. 9 – The Witmark Demos: 1962–1964 in October 2010. Anita Carter recorded her version of the Dylan arrangement for her 1964 album Anita of the Carter Family. Tom Paxton used the tune as a basis for "The Last Thing on My Mind", recorded by many artists.

The tune was adapted by the Breton folk band Tri Yann for the song "Je m'en vas" on Le Pélégrin in 2001.

"Leaving of Liverpool" inspired cowboy music. Ed Stabler wrote a cowboy's version called "The Leavin' of Texas".

The tune is used in the 1997 film Titanic, as the ship departs from Ireland. The name of this piece is "Take Her to Sea, Mr. Murdoch", and it is written by James Horner.

Fran O'Toole and Des Lee of The Miami Showband adapted this tune for the 1976 album Reflections of Fran O'Toole

Another version of the tune (entitled "Fare Thee Well") was recorded by Tony Rice on his 1983 album Cold on the Shoulder.
