= Medieval Classic Rock =

Studio album by Stary Olsa
- Released: 15 August 2016
- Recorded: 2016
- Genre: Medieval folk rock
- Length: 35:14
- Label: Cool Hat Records

Stary Olsa chronology
Kola rycerska (2016)	Medieval Classic Rock (2016)	Water, Hops and Malt (2017)

Professional ratings
Review scores
Source	Rating
Experty.by	6.5/10 stars

Medieval Classic Rock is the thirteenth studio album of the Belarusian band Stary Olsa playing medieval folk. The album contains cover versions of rock hits of the second half of the 20th century played on medieval instruments. The album was released on August 15, 2016 through the American label Cool Hat Records. It was created under the influence of YouTube users’ feedback who admitted that the band's cover version video of "One" by Metallica was a success.

The band Stary Olsa plays Eastern European medieval songs, mostly of the Grand Duchy of Lithuania time. This is the only album of the band where they perform songs of the 20th century.

== Background ==
The leader of Stary Olsa band, Zmicier Sasnoŭski, said in one of his interviews that modern music and music of the Middle Ages are surprisingly good combined. Reefs of guitar rock music can be easily and successfully played on ancient medieval instruments. Sasnoŭski also said that they play modern songs on old instruments at the rehearsals from time to time but just for entertainment and treat this more like a joke and never play these songs at the concerts. In October 2014 the band Stary Olsa took part in the show "Legends.Live" ("Легенды.Live") on ONT channel, that was dedicated to Metallica band performance, where they sang the song "One". The video of this performance aroused interest among YouTube viewers. Notes about this video appeared on American metal sites. Then the band recorded several more cover versions for the same show. At first it was "Child in Time" song by Deep Purple, later "Californication" by Red Hot Chili Peppers. Then they played the songs "Ob-La-Di, Ob-La-Da" and "Yellow Submarine" at the festival dedicated to the Beatles.

== Kickstarter campaign ==
According to the band members all this time they were written by people from all over the world who admitted the new and fresh sound of the famous hits and also asked about the possibility to buy the album. The group also began to receive invitations to come with tours to the United States. At the end of February 2016 the musicians went to the Kickstarter website trying to raise money for the recording of a full-length album, which would include cover versions of rock hits played on medieval instruments. The initial amount of $7,000 was collected within a week and the musicians slightly increased it to record some more tracks. New tracks could be chosen by the Kickstarter backers themselves from the proposed ones through voting. As there was much more money collected to record the album than it was needed the band members started to plan tours in to the USA. The required sum was increased once again and this time to cover the costs of visas, flights across the Atlantic and the rental of a minibus. In total $29,890 was collected.

== Release and US tour ==
The album Medieval Classic Rock was recorded in Minsk and released in a small edition in the USA through the label Cool Hat Records in mid-August. The presentation took place on August 19 in San Francisco. From this moment and until early October Stary Olsa traveled with tours around the USA. The musicians visited 21 states and played 58 concerts in total. In Minsk the presentation of the album took place on November 20.

According to the band members, their concerts were visited mostly by Americans and most Slavs attended only the concerts in San Francisco and New York City. The musicians noted that Renaissance festivals are held in America as well, no matter that they had no Middle Ages, however Americans have their own idea of these times. You can meet Vikings, musketeers as well as soldiers of World War II at their festivals. Zmicier Sasnoŭski also told about the event that happened while performing in a Lutheran church in Maryland when a local pastor himself asked them to play "Highway to Hell", that would be completely impossible in Belarus.

== Critical reception ==
On the Belarusian site Experty.by devoted to music the average expert rating of the album is 6.5 out of 10. Nikolai Yankoyt noted that this record is very qualitative and competent, but it's only a cover album and nothing more. In his opinion there are not enough of crossovers like the last song. Yegor Tsyvilko also noted that the band’s problems with originality are seen in this album: "Still, Stary Olsa is more exciting in playing medieval music with rock drive than in inscribing the modern rock in antiquity." According to Conrad Erofeev: "The jokes taken out of the context stop being funny, the material hasn’t received any new musical dimension and as a result here we have at best a fan service, at worst - a banal kitsch."

== Track listing ==
No.	Title	Writer(s)	Performer	Length
1.	"Highway to Hell"	Angus Young, Ronald Scott and Malcolm Young	AC/DC	3:21
2.	"Another Brick in the Wall, Part II"	Roger Waters	Pink Floyd	4:08
3.	"Californication"	Michael Balzary, John Frusciante, Chad Smith and Anthony Kiedis	Red Hot Chili Peppers	4:11
4.	"A Hard Day's Night"	John Lennon and Paul McCartney	The Beatles	2:32
5.	"One"	James Hetfield and Lars Ulrich	Metallica	3:30
6.	"Child in Time"	Roger Glover, Ian Paice, Ian Gillan, Jon Lord and Ritchie Blackmore	Deep Purple	6:22
7.	"Ob-La-Di, Ob-La-Da" (Instrumental)	John Lennon and Paul McCartney	The Beatles	2:10
8.	"Iron Man"	Anthony Iommi, John Osbourne, Terence Butler and William Ward	Black Sabbath	4:30
9.	"Ai Vis Lo Lop / Smells Like Teen Spirit" (Instrumental)	Kurt Cobain, David Grohl and Krist Novoselic	traditional song / Nirvana	4:30
Total length:				35:14

- Instrumental composition "Smells Like Teen Spirit" was mixed with Occitan folk song "Ai Vis Lo Lop" (English: I saw the wolf).

== Personnel ==
Credits for Medieval Classic Rock adapted from Bandcamp.

- Illia Kublicki – lute, cisters
- Alieś Čumakoŭ – vocal, gusli, cister, rebec, shawms, hurdy-gurdy, tromba marina
- Maryja Šaryj – flutes, shawms
- Zmicier Sasnoŭski – bagpipes
- Siarhiej Tapčeŭski – drums, percussion, tromba marina, back vocals
- Aliaksiej Vojciech – drums, percussion
- Back vocals: Andrej Apanovič, Vitaĺ Kulieŭski
- Recording: Sunflowers studio, Vitaĺ Kulieŭski
- Mixing and mastering: Juryj Haračka
- Cover design: Dzianis Likhalap
- Photography: Nikolay Maminov (Nikolodion), Vitali Frozen, Zaryna Kandraćjeva
