= Bretonne (album) =

Studio album by Nolwenn Leroy
- Released: December 2010
- Recorded: 2010
- Genre: Pop, Celtic, Breton, world
- Length: 44:53 / 69:17 (deluxe ed.)
- Label: Universal International; Mercury France
- Producer: Jon Kelly

Nolwenn Leroy chronology
Le Cheshire Cat et moi (2009)	Bretonne (2010)	Ô filles de l'eau (2012)

Bretonne is the fourth studio album by French singer Nolwenn Leroy, with arrangements by Jon Kelly. The album was released December 6, 2010 and has a reissue with 7 additional tracks 28 November 2011. It is a homage to her native Brittany. This is an album dedicated to Breton and Celtic music which marked Nolwenn, mixing traditional songs, modern pop in connection with standards of Celtic music. It includes traditional Breton tunes, more recent songs and an original song signed by the Breton singer Miossec.

The album was a certified double diamond disc in France, a double platinum disc in Belgium and a gold disc in Switzerland. After its successful release in Germany it was released internationally in July 2012 (UK, Canada, Japan). Its release in the United States was accompanied by a concert in New York City, January 8, 2013.

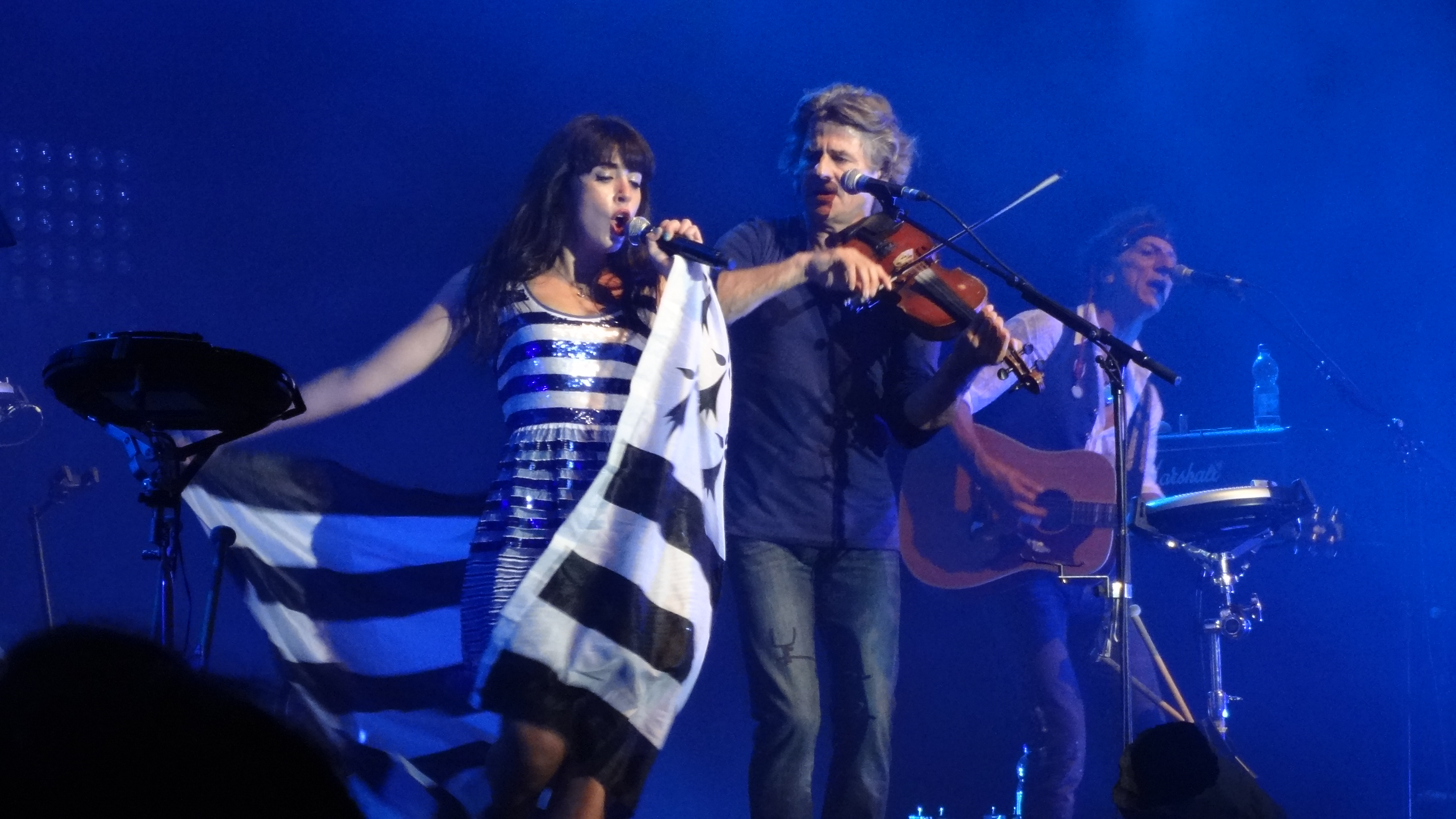
Nolwenn Leroy and the flag of Brittany

== Track listing ==
=== French edition ===
Original edition (2010):

1. "Tri Martolod"
2. "La Jument de Michao"
3. "Suite Sudarmoricaine"
4. "Greensleeves"
5. "Brest"
6. "Bro Gozh ma Zadoù"
7. "Mná na hÉireann"
8. "Ma Bretagne quand elle pleut"
9. "Je ne serai jamais ta Parisienne"
10. "Karantez Vro"
11. "Le Bagad de Lann-Bihoué"
12. "Dans les prisons de Nantes"
13. "Rentrer en Bretagne"
14. "Sunday Bloody Sunday" (iTunes exclusive)

Unreleased tracks from the Deluxe Edition (2011):

1. "Moonlight Shadow"
2. "Scarborough Fair"
3. "Whiskey in the Jar"
4. "Siúil A Rúin"
5. "To France"
6. "Amazing Grace"
7. "Dirty Old Town"

=== US edition ===
Nolwenn (2013):

1. "Moonlight Shadow"
2. "Scarborough Fair"
3. "Dirty Old Town"
4. "Amazing Grace"
5. "Tri Martolod"
6. "Whiskey in the Jar"
7. "Siúil A Rúin"
8. "Greensleeves"
9. "Suite Sudarmoricaine"
10. "To France"
11. "Mná na h-Éireann"
12. "Karantez Vro"

== Singles ==
- Suite Sudarmoricaine
- Mná na h-Éireann
- La Jument de Michao
- Tri Martolod
- Brest
- Moonlight Shadow

== Charts ==
=== Weekly charts ===
Chart (2010–2013)	Peak position
Belgian Albums (Ultratop Wallonia)	1
French Albums (SNEP)	1
French Albums Digital (SNEP)	1
German Albums (Offizielle Top 100)	13
Quebec Francophone Albums (ADISQ)	9
South Korean Albums (Gaon)	34
South Korean Albums International (Gaon)	9
Swiss Albums (Schweizer Hitparade)	20
Swiss Albums (Schweizer Hitparade Romandy)	1
US Billboard World Albums	10

=== Year-end charts ===
Chart (2010)	Position
French Albums (SNEP)	24
Chart (2011)	Position
Belgian Albums (Ultratop Wallonia)	3
French Albums (SNEP)	2
Swiss Albums (Schweizer Hitparade)	85
