= Jean-Paul Corbineau =

French singer-songwriter (1948–2022)

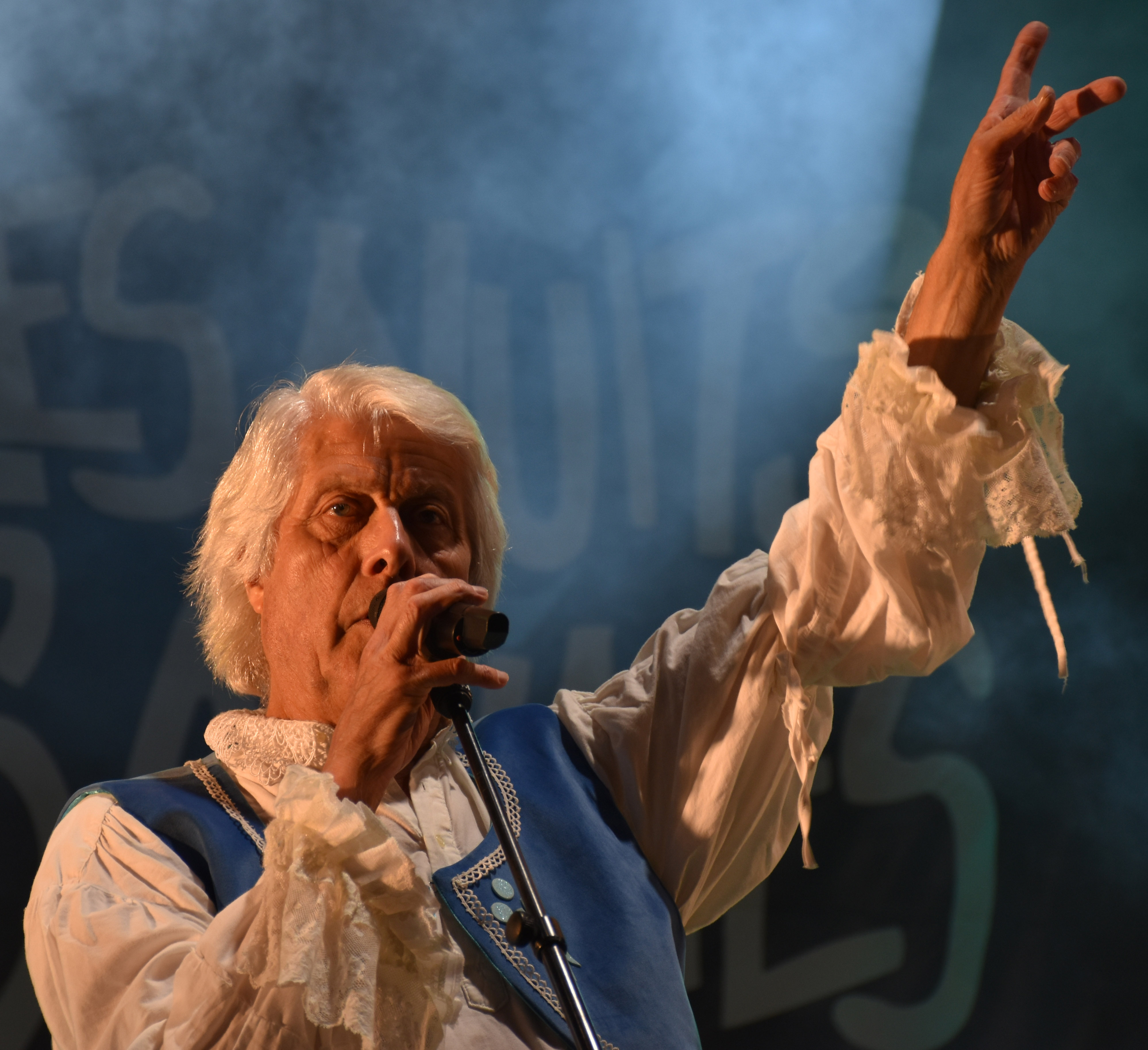
- Corbineau in 2019
- Born: 26 August 1948; Nantes, French Fourth Republic
- Died: 16 December 2022 (aged 74); Nantes, French Fifth Republic
- Occupation: Singer-songwriter

Jean-Paul Corbineau (26 August 1948 – 16 December 2022) was a French singer-songwriter. He was a founding member of the band Tri Yann.

== Biography ==
Corbineau was dedicated to preserving the Breton identity and supported the merger of Loire-Atlantique into Brittany. In 1966, he performed in Brittany with Jean Chocun under the name "Les Classic's" and singing folk songs by the likes of Graeme Allwright and Hugues Aufray.

In 1970, Jean-Louis Jossic joined Chocun and Corbineau and the group Tri Yann was formed. They called themselves "trois Jean de Nantes". Their first performance came in December 1970 with Corbineau playing the acoustic guitar, percussion, harmonica, and spoons.

Prior to becoming a professional musician, Corbineau worked as a produce grocer at hypermarket chain Record in Saint-Herblain. In December 1972, when Tri Yann performed at the Olympia in an opening act for Juliette Gréco, he was still working at the store.

In January 2000, the three members of Tri Yann were named Knights of the Ordre des Arts et des Lettres.

Corbineau died of leukemia in Nantes, on 16 December 2022, at the age of 74.

== Discography ==
- La Chanson de Lola (1984)
- La Muraille (1984)
