= Cassé =

2003 single by Nolwenn Leroy

Single by Nolwenn Leroy

from the album Nolwenn
- Released: 23 March 2003
- Recorded: France, 2003
- Genre: Pop, World
- Length: 4:32
- Label: Universal International; Mercury France
- Songwriter(s): Lionel Florence; Francis Maggiulli
- Producer(s): Pascal Obispo; David Gategno

Nolwenn Leroy singles chronology
"Cassé" (2003)	"Une Femme cachée" (2003)

"Cassé" is Nolwenn Leroy's debut single from her album Nolwenn. It was released in 2003 in France, Belgium and Switzerland and achieved a great success in these countries, topping the French and Belgian charts.

== Lyrics, music and video ==
"Cassé" was written and composed by Lionel Florence and Francis Maggiulli, and produced by Pascal Obispo and David Gategno. It is the first track on the album, Nolwenn.

The music video of "Cassé" begins with Nolwenn walking towards a studio. While singing, she gets prepared for a photoshoot and then poses in front of a camera with different outfits. During the last part of the video, she is seen playing various musical instruments such as cello, piano and violin.

== Chart performances ==
"Cassé" was number 1 on the French Singles Charts in its first week of release and stayed at this position for two successive weeks. The single managed to stay in the top 5 for another 4 weeks before dropping very quickly until leaving the chart on 6 July, after 17 weeks of attendance. It was ranked #25 on Annual Chart.
The song may be considered as Nolwenn Leroy's most successful single to date. It was also her first and only single to reach #1 on the French SNEP Singles Charts until "Nolwenn Ohwo!" in 2006.

In Belgium Wallonia, the single went straight to #2 on 29 March 2003, then topped the chart for two weeks. It was then #2 for two weeks and #3 for four weeks. After that, it kept on dropping on the chart and totaled ten weeks in the top ten, and 13 weeks in the top 40. It achieved Gold status and was the ninth best-selling single of the year in this country.

== Track listing ==
CD single

1. "Cassé" (4:30)
2. "Ce qu'il nous faudrait" (3:34)

== Certification ==
Country	Certification	Date	Sales certified
Belgium	Gold	2003	25,000

== Charts ==
Chart (2003)	Peak position
Belgian (Wallonia) Singles Chart	1
French SNEP Singles Chart	1
Swiss Singles Chart	4

End of year chart (2003)	Position
Belgian (Wallonia) Singles Chart	9
French Singles Chart	25
Swiss Singles Chart	65
