= Nolwenn Ohwo! =

"Nolwenn Owho!"

Single by Nolwenn Leroy

from the album Histoires Naturelles
- B-side: "Mystère"
- Released: 23 January 2006
- Recorded: France, 2005
- Genre: Pop
- Length: 4:34 (album version)
- Label: Universal Music, Mercury
- Songwriter(s): Alain Souchon; Laurent Voulzy; Nolwenn Leroy
- Producer(s): Laurent Voulzy; Frank Eulry

Nolwenn Leroy singles chronology
"Inévitablement" (2004)	"Nolwenn Owho!" (2006)	"Histoires naturelles" (2006)

"Nolwenn Ohwo!" is a 2006 song recorded by French singer Nolwenn Leroy. It was the first single from her second studio album Histoires Naturelles, and was released on 23 January 2006. It achieved success in France, where it topped the singles chart, and Belgium (Wallonia), where it was a top three hit.

== Song information ==
The song was co-written by famous singer-songwriters Alain Souchon and Laurent Voulzy (he also participated in the writing of Leroy's previous album, notably on the song "Suivre une étoile"), and Leroy herself. It was performed during the Histoires naturelles tour and was available in its live version on the album of the same name.

In France, the song was first released digitally in early December 2005. It was then officially released as a CD single in a limited edition on 23 January but it was sold by certain stores a few days before. Therefore, it entered the French single chart two days before, at #47, before climbing straight to #1 the week after. It then almost kept on dropping, and totalled four weeks in the top ten, 11 weeks in the top 50 and 19 weeks on the chart (top 100).

== Track listings ==
CD single - Limited edition

1. "Nolwenn Ohwo!" (radio edit) — 3:59
2. "Mystère" — 3:54
3. "Nolwenn Ohwo!" (video)

CD single - Promo

1. "Nolwenn Ohwo!" (radio edit) — 3:59

Digital download

1. "Nolwenn Ohwo!" (album version) — 4:34
2. "Nolwenn Ohwo!" (live version) — 5:08

== Charts ==
Chart (2006)	Peak position
Belgian (Wallonia) Singles Chart	3
Eurochart Hot 100	5
French Digital Chart	5
French SNEP Singles Chart	1
Swiss Singles Chart	29

End of year chart (2006)	Position
Belgian (Wallonia) Singles Chart	49
French Singles Chart	36
