= Suite Sudarmoricaine =

Breton song

Suite Sud-Armoricaine is a bawdy Breton song in Breton, popularized by Alan Stivell in the 1970s. It is the only song in Breton ever to make the number one chart spot on French radio Europe 1. The lyrics are from the Pardon Speied (the Pardon of the village of Spézet) date from 1950s and they are in the public domain because the author is unknown. The song is originally a traditional Breton musical air.

== Lyrics ==
Breton

E pardon Speied e oan bet
Ur plac'h yaouank am eus kavet

'Barzh ar park vras hon eus kousket
Ur verol bras am eus paket

D'an ospital on bet kaset
War an daol vras on bet lakaet

Ha ma lost bras 'zo bet troc'het
Dre ar prenestr eo bet kaset

Ur meil ki-bleiz 'zo tremenet
Ha ma lost bras e-neus debret

Ha ma lost bras e-neus debret
Hag ar c'hi-bleiz a zo marvet

English

At the pardon of Spezet, I went
A young girl, I found

In a large field, we slept
The great pox, I caught

At the hospital, I was sent
On a large table, I was placed

And my big cock was cut
Through the window, it was thrown

A huge wolf-dog rose
And my big cock, he ate

And my big cock, he ate
And dog-wolf is dead

== Recordings ==
- Alan Stivell: albums À l'Olympia (1972), Again (1993 with Shane MacGowan), Back to Breizh (2000 in French).
- An Triskell as Suite Pourlette (album Musiques Celtiques, 1973).
- Polish band Shannon (2000).
- Franco-Slovak band Roc'hann (album Skladby z nášho, 2008).
- Nolwenn Leroy (album Bretonne, 2010).
- Beltaine (album Tríú, 2010).
- Les Stentors (album Voyage en France, 2012).
- Julien Jaffrès (album Rock'n Celtic Guitar, 2012).
