= Nolwenn (album) =

Studio album by Nolwenn Leroy
- Released: March 2003
- Recorded: 2003
- Genre: Pop, World
- Length: 47:50
- Label: Universal International; Mercury France
- Producer: TF1

Nolwenn Leroy chronology
Nolwenn (2003)	Histoires Naturelles (2005)

Nolwenn is the self-titled debut album of the second season winner of Star Academy France, Nolwenn Leroy. It was released during March 2003 in France where it became Nolwenn's first #1 album. It featured some of the top French songwriters such as Laurent Voulzy, Lara Fabian, Pascal Obispo, Daniel Lavoie and Lionel Florence.

== Track listing ==
=== CD standard edition track listing ===
1. "Cassé" (Broken)
2. "Être une femme" (Being a Woman)
3. "Suivre une étoile" (Follow a Star)
4. "Inévitablement" (Inevitably)
5. "Jure-moi" (Swear to Me)
6. "Vu d'en haut" (Seen from the Top)
7. "Ce qu'il nous faudrait" (What We Would Need)
8. "Une femme cachée" (A Hidden Woman)
9. "Finir contre toi" (Finish Against You)
10. "Rayer l'émotion inutile" (Stripe the Useless Emotion)
11. "14 février" (14th of February)
12. "Qui mieux que moi" (Who Better Than Me)

=== LP edition bonus tracks ===
1. Suivre une étoile (New Mix Single)
2. Une femme cachée (Nouveau Mix)
3. Inévitablement (Radio Edit)
4. Crucify (Tori Amos Cover)

== Singles ==
The first single, "Cassé" debuted and peaked at #1 in France. The second single, "Une Femme Cachée", failed to match the success of "Cassé" and only managed to peak inside the top 40. The third single, "Suivre Une Etoile", was more successful and became a top 20 hit. The fourth and last extract from the album, "Inévitablement", was #31.

== Chart performance and sales ==
A week before its release, the album debuted at #31 on the French Albums Charts. The following week, it topped the chart, becoming Leroy's first #1 album. The album was certified platinum with more than 300,000 copies sold in November 2003. As of 2006, Universal International claims that more than 600,000 albums have been sold.

== Charts ==
=== Weekly charts ===
Chart (2003)	Peak position
Belgian Albums (Ultratop Wallonia)	1
French Albums (SNEP)	1
Swiss Albums (Schweizer Hitparade)	2

=== Year-end charts ===
Chart (2003)	Position
Belgian Albums (Ultratop Wallonia)	7
French Albums (SNEP)	12
Swiss Albums (Schweizer Hitparade)	80
