= Stary Olsa =

Belarusian medieval folk band

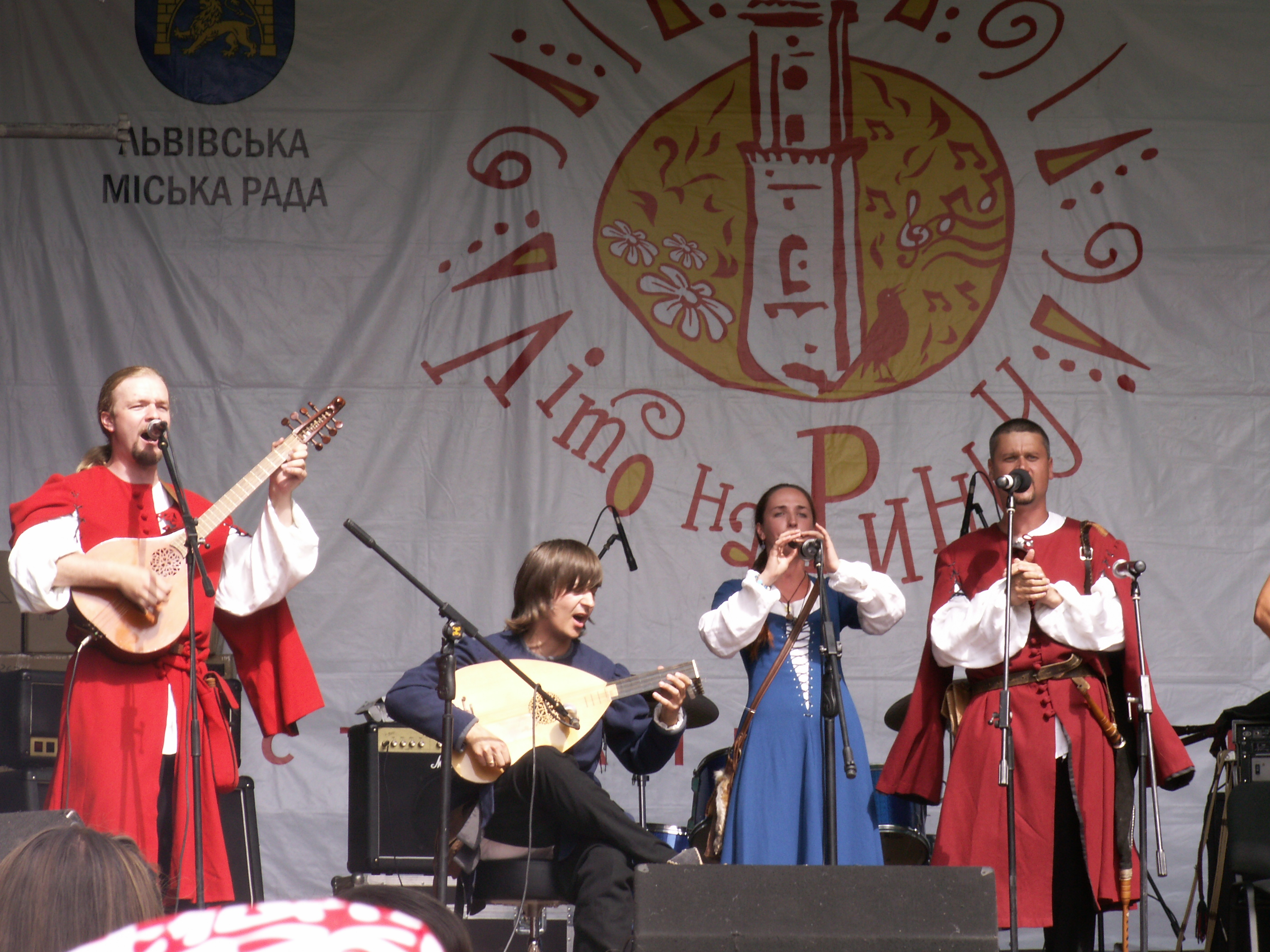

Background information
- Origin: Belarus
- Genres: Rock, folk rock, medieval rock
- Years active: 1999–present
- Members: Źmicier Sasnoŭski; Maryja Šaryj; Aleś Čumakoŭ; Illia Kublicki; Siarhiej Tapčeŭski; Aliaksiej Vojciech
- Past members: Andrej Apanovič; Aksana Kaścian; Kaciaryna Radziviłava; Kaciaryna Pinčuk
- Website: staryolsa.com

Stary Olsa (Belarusian: Стары Ольса) is a Belarusian medieval folk rock band, that plays medieval Ruthenian music of the Grand Duchy of Lithuania. The band has also released classical rock cover works in their Medieval Classic Rock where classical rock songs performed by bagpipes.

Stary Olsa is one of the few Belarusian bands enjoying popularity outside Belarus. The band has received numerous positive critical reviews. They are also known for covering modern rock tracks using their medieval instruments, and released a cover album, via a Kickstarter campaign, in 2016.

The band was founded in 1999 by Źmicier Sasnoŭski. The name Stary Olsa means "Old Olsa", where Olsa is a left tributary of Berezina in Mogilev Oblast, Belarus.

In 2026, Aleś Čumakoŭ was sentenced to two years in prison under the article "participation in an extremist group" for his alleged involvement with the Belarusian Council of Culture. Human rights defenders recognized him as a political prisoner. He was released on September 16, 2026, and forcibly deported to Lithuania along with 24 other political prisoners.

== Discography ==
=== Albums ===
- Kielich Koła (2000)
- Vir (2001)
- Verbum (2002)
- Šlach (2003)
- Ładździa rospačy (2004)
- Skarby litvinaŭ (2004)
- Siaredniaviečnaja dyskateka (2005)
- Hieraičny epas (Spevy rycarau i ŝliachty Vialikaj Litvy, 2006)
- Drygula (2009)
- Liepŝaje (The Best) (2009)
- Santa Maria (2013)
- Kola rycerska (2016)
- Medieval Classic Rock (2016)
- Water, Hops and Malt (2017)

=== Clips ===
- U karčmie (2004) - the Belarusian translation of the medieval song In taberna.
- VITAUT (2008)
- DRYHULA remix (2008)

=== Projects with other musicians ===
- Lehiendy Vialikaha Kniastva (2001)
- Lehiendy Vialikaha Kniastva - 2 (2004)
- Hienerały ajčynnaha roku (2004)
- Premjer Tuzin (2005)

== Members ==
=== Current members ===
- Źmicier Sasnoŭski: bagpipes, lyre, mandolin, gusli, percussion, vocals
- Maryja Šaryj: flute, shawms
- Aleś Čumakoŭ: lyre, mandolin, gusli, vocals
- Illia Kublicki: lute, organ
- Siarhiej Tapčeŭski: drums, percussion, tromba marina
- Aliaksiej Vojciech: drums, percussion

=== Former members ===
- Andrej Apanovič (2002-2015): drums, bagpipe, flute alto, vocals
- Aksana Kaścian (2005-2007): flutes, shawms
- Kaciaryna Radziviłava (2002-2005): flutes, shawms
- Kaciaryna Pinčuk (2005): flutes, shawms

== Literature ==
- Д.П. (2008). "«Стары Ольса»". Энцыклапедыя беларускай папулярнай музыкі (2000 экз ed.). Мінск: Zmicier Kołas. pp. 283–284. ISBN 978-985-6783-42-8.
