= Le Pélégrin =

Studio album by Tri Yann
- Released: 2001
- Genre: Breton music

Tri Yann chronology
La Tradition symphonique	Le Pélégrin	30 ans au Zénith

Le Pélégrin is an album by the group Tri Yann released in January 2001, their first album since Portraits, in 1995.

The album is a trip across Celtic regions, from Scotland to La Compostella. The songs are almost all compositions by the group. For the first time, the group uses a female singer in Bleunwenn (sister of Konan Mevel) who took over while Jean-Paul Corbineau was sick in 2000. 2001 was also the thirtieth anniversary of the group.

== Tracks ==
No.	Title	Length
1.	"I Rim Bo Ro"
2.	"Je m'en vas"
3.	"Le Chasseur de temps"
4.	"Keenan's Pub"
5.	"Les Filles d'Irlande"
6.	"La Geste de Sarajevo"
7.	"Korantenig"
8.	"Fransozig"
9.	"Maiawela"
10.	"Buvons vin de Clisson"
11.	"Gwerz Porsal"
12.	"L'ULM Merveilleux"
13.	"De nivôse en frimaire"
14.	"À matine à la télé"
15.	"Kas abahr en Okitania"
16.	"Dansons la listériole"
17.	"L'Arrivée à Compostelle"

== Musicians ==
- Jean Chocun
- Jean-Paul Corbineau
- Jean-Louis Jossic
- Gérard Goron
- Jean-Luc Chevalier
- Konan Mevel (bagpipes)
- Freddy Bourgeois (keyboards)
- Christophe Peloil (violin)
