= Histoires Naturelles (album) =

Studio album by Nolwenn Leroy
- Released: December 2005
- Recorded: 2005
- Genre: Pop, World
- Length: 47:55
- Label: Universal International; Mercury France
- Producer: TF1

Nolwenn Leroy chronology
Nolwenn (2003)	Histoires Naturelles (2005)	Histoires Naturelles Tour (2007)

Histoires Naturelles is Nolwenn Leroy's second album. It was released on 5 December 2005 in France. Most of the songs were written by the French singer Laurent Voulzy and Nolwenn Leroy herself. The title track was written in English by Yasmin Shah and Arnaud Rosenthal, and "Mélusine" by Yasmin Shah. "London Fantasy" was co-written by members of English down-tempo band Sundae Club. Leroy adapted all the English-language lyrics into French.

The album reached #3 on the French charts soon after its release and has achieved platinum status. The first single from "Histoires Naturelles", "Nolwenn Ohwo!", reached #1 and the second extract "Histoire Naturelle" was #30. The third single released was "Mon Ange"; it managed to peak at #14 on the French Download Singles Chart. "J'aimais Tant L'Aimer" was only a promotional single.

== Track listing ==
1. "Nolwenn Ohwo!" – 4:34
2. "L'Enfant cerf-volant" – 3:38
3. "Reste encore" – 3:44
4. "Mon ange" – 4:22
5. "Histoire naturelle" – 3:53
6. "Rien de mieux au monde" – 3:29
7. "Mystère" – 3:54
8. "Les Chimères" (instrumental) – 0:51
9. "Le Rêve des filles" – 5:07
10. "Endormie" – 2:27
11. "London Fantasy" – 3:53
12. "Mélusine" – 3:56
13. "J'aimais tant l'aimer" – 4:40

== Certifications ==
Country	Certification	Date	Sales certified	Physical sales
France	Platinum	20 December 2006	200,000	141,739 in 2005 + 92,114 in 2006

== Charts ==
Chart (2005–2007)	Peak position
Belgian (Wallonia) Albums Chart	7
French Digital Chart	2
French Albums Chart	3
Swiss Albums Chart	44

End of the year chart (2005)	Position
Belgian (Wallonia) Albums Chart	62
French Albums Chart	51
End of the year chart (2006)	Position
Belgian (Wallonia) Albums Chart	69
French Albums Chart	70
