= Le Cheshire Cat et moi =

Studio album by Nolwenn Leroy
- Released: 7 December 2009
- Recorded: 2009; Varispeed Studios, Lund
- Genre: Pop
- Length: 47:04
- Label: Universal International; Mercury France
- Producer: Teitur

Nolwenn Leroy chronology
Histories Naturelles Tour (2007)	Le Cheshire Cat et moi (2009)	Bretonne (2010)

Le Cheshire Cat et moi is Nolwenn Leroy's third album. It was released on 7 December 2009.

== Track listing ==
1. "Le Cheshire cat" – 3:40
2. "Faut-il, faut-il pas ?" – 2:45
3. "Mademoiselle de la gamelle" – 2:49
4. "Feel Good" – 3:04
5. "Cauchemar" – 4:28
6. "Valse au sommet" – 3:23
7. "Parfaitement insaisissable" – 3:51
8. "You Get Me" – 4:14
9. "Textile schizophrène" – 3:16
10. "Amis des jours de pluie" – 3:10
11. "Safe and Sound" – 3:29
12. "Ici c'est moi qui commande" (Collectors Edition) – 2:44
13. "Aucune idée" (Collectors Edition) – 2:51
14. "Me and You" (iTunes exclusive) – 3:20

== Certifications ==
Country	Certification	Date	Sales certified	Physical sales
France	Gold	2009	50,000	

== Charts ==
Chart (2009–2010)	Peak position
Belgian Albums (Ultratop Wallonia)	32
French Albums (SNEP)	26
French Albums Digital (SNEP)	5
Swiss Albums (Schweizer Hitparade Romandy)	47
