= Nolwenn Leroy =

French musician (born 1982)

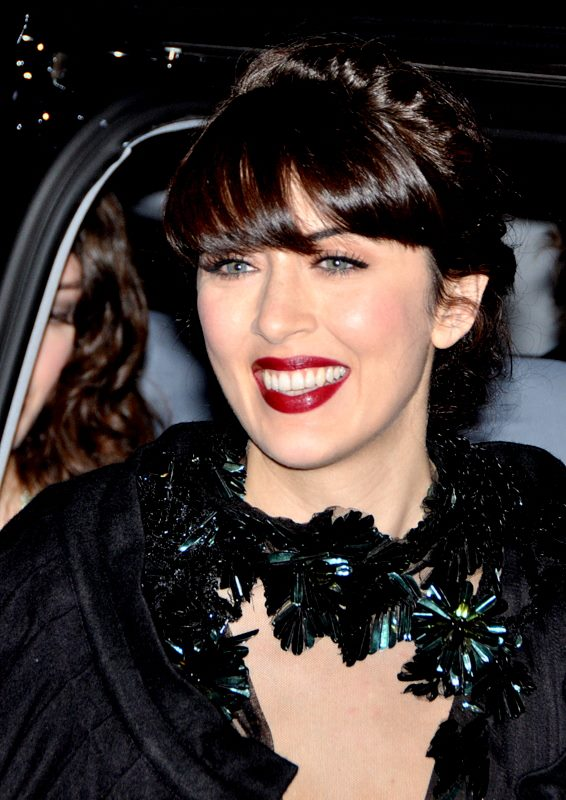
- Leroy attending the NRJ Music Awards in Cannes, France, on 26 January 2013

Background information
- Born: Nolwenn Le Magueresse; 28 September 1982 (age 43); Saint-Renan, Brittany, France
- Genres: Pop; indie pop; electropop; world; celtic; folk
- Occupations: Musician; singer; songwriter; actress
- Instruments: Vocals; violin; guitar
- Years active: 2002–present
- Labels: Universal International; Polydor France; Mercury France; Wrasse Records (UK)
- Partner(s): Arnaud Clément (2008–present)
- Website: nolwennleroy.com

Nolwenn Le Magueresse (French pronunciation: [nolwɛn lə maɡəʁɛs]; born 28 September 1982), known by her stage name Nolwenn Leroy (pronounced [nolwɛn ləʁwa]), is a French singer-songwriter and actress.

Originally classically trained (violin and opera singing), she rose to fame after winning the second season of the French television music competition Star Academy in 2002. She has since recorded eight studio albums and scored two number one singles, "Cassé" and "Nolwenn Ohwo!", on the French charts. In 2012, her album Bretonne was certified two times diamond for sales exceeding one million copies.

Leroy is fluent in English, having spent a year in the United States as an exchange student. She sings in many languages, including French, Breton, English and Irish.

Leroy has received numerous awards and nominations. In January 2015, she was ranked 17th on Le Journal du Dimanche's 50 Most Loved Celebrities in France, making her the top female singer on the list since December 2012. She was appointed an Officer of the Order of the Arts and Letters by the French Ministry of Culture in 2021. In 2025, she was named a Knight of the Legion of Honour, the highest French accolade.

== Biography ==
=== Early life ===
Leroy was born in Saint-Renan (Finistère) in 1982. Leroy's parents left Saint-Renan when she was four years old. After living in Paris, Lille, and Guingamp, her mother, Muriel Leroy, and her younger sister, Kay, settled with Leroy's grandparents in Saint-Yorre. Her mother divorced from her father, professional footballer Jean-Luc Le Magueresse, in 1993.

Nolwenn studied at the "Collège des Célestins" in Vichy. When Leroy was eleven, her music teacher noticed her musical talents and encouraged her to learn the violin. At the age of thirteen she won "Les écoles du désert", a contest sponsored by the Cora supermarket chain, which allowed her to travel with a humanitarian mission from Gao to Timbuktu, Mali; she later claimed this had a profound influence on her.

In July 1998, Leroy was awarded a scholarship by the Vichy Rotary Club to travel to Hamilton, Ohio, United States, as an exchange student. While attending Hamilton High School, she took music lessons at the Performing Arts School and became fluent in English. When she returned to France, she began classical singing classes at the Vichy music conservatory. In 2001, she enrolled in the University of Clermont-Ferrand to study law for a potential alternative career to music.

=== Career ===
==== 2002: Star Academy ====
After watching the first season of Star Academy broadcast on TF1 in 2001, Leroy was impressed by Armande Altaï, a singing teacher and one of the show's judges. She subsequently joined Altaï's singing classes in Paris for over six months. In 2002, Nolwenn was selected for the second season of Star Academy, but she was also given the part of Scarlett O'Hara in the French stage musical Autant en emporte le vent (Gone with the Wind) by Gérard Presgurvic. Leroy ended up choosing Star Academy over the musical. As a contestant on the show, Leroy spent four months in a castle located in Dammarie-lès-Lys, and followed acting, dancing and singing classes. On 21 December 2002, she was declared the winner ahead of fellow finalist, Houcine Camara, earning her a record deal with Universal Music France.

==== 2003–2004: Eponymous debut album ====
Leroy's first album, Nolwenn, was released in March 2003 and was certified platinum by November for sales exceeding 300,000 copies. In 2006, the album was certified two times platinum by the Syndicat national de l'édition phonographique (SNEP) for more than 600,000 copies sold. Both the album and the first single "Cassé" topped the charts in France and Belgium. Three other songs from the album were released as singles: "Une Femme cachée", "Suivre une étoile" and "Inévitablement". Leroy went on her first solo tour in France, Belgium and Switzerland in late 2003 to promote songs from the album.

==== 2005–2008: Histoires Naturelles ====
Leroy's second album, Histoires Naturelles, was released on 5 December 2005. It was produced by Laurent Voulzy and Frank Eulry. The album's lead single "Nolwenn Ohwo!", co-written by Alain Souchon, Voulzy and Leroy herself, topped the French charts one week after its release. The second single was the title track, "Histoire Naturelle". Music videos were made for both songs; the video for "Histoire Naturelle" expressed the main theme of the album with Leroy being portrayed as natural history museum exhibits. Of the other single releases, "Mon Ange" was distributed digitally while "J'aimais tant l'aimer" and "Reste Encore" were promotional-only. The album reached platinum status with sales exceeding 400,000 copies. Leroy performed songs from both Histoires Naturelles and Nolwenn on her second solo tour, which started in September 2006. Leroy's first live album, Histoires Naturelles Tour, was subsequently released in late October 2007.

==== 2009–2010: Le Cheshire Cat et Moi ====
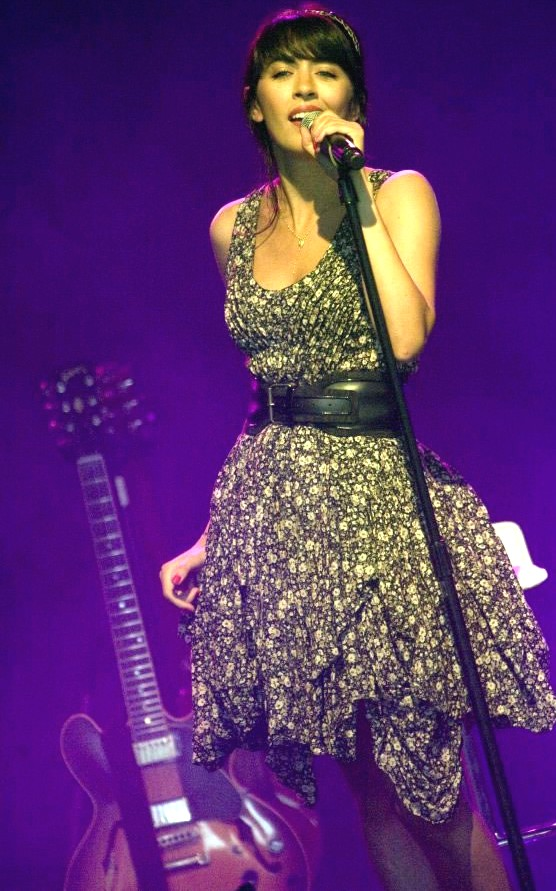
Leroy performing at the 2010 Francofolies in Spa (Belgium).

Le Cheshire Cat & Moi was a project that began in 2007, co-written by Leroy and Teitur Lassen, with contributions from Jonatha Brooke, Michelle Featherstone, Mike Errico and Rupert Hine. It was arranged and produced by Lassen, and recorded in Sweden and the Faroe Islands. The album's lead single, "Faut-il, faut-il pas ?", was released in November 2009 along with a music video directed by Yoann Lemoine. With the album, Leroy presented "a lighter sound than on previous releases" and she was given the opportunity to write all the lyrics. The album was released on 7 December 2009 and was later certified gold. A tour entitled "Le Cheshire Cat & Vous" to promote the record was held in 2010.

==== 2010–2012: Bretonne ====
Leroy released a fourth studio album, Bretonne, on 6 December 2010. Cover versions of traditional Celtic songs such as "Mná na h-Éireann", "Tri Martolod", "La Jument de Michao", and contemporary songs such as Christophe Miossec's "Brest" were included on the album. Most of the songs related to Brittany, the singer's birthplace. Four of them were sung in Breton ("Tri Martolod", "Suite Sudarmoricaine", "Bro Gozh ma Zadoù", "Karantez Vro"), one in Irish ("Mná na h-Éireann"), and the rest in French and English. Leroy collaborated with Jon Kelly for the musical arrangements. The album topped the French album charts for seven weeks and the Belgian album charts for five weeks. It was certified double diamond by the SNEP for sales exceeding one million copies.

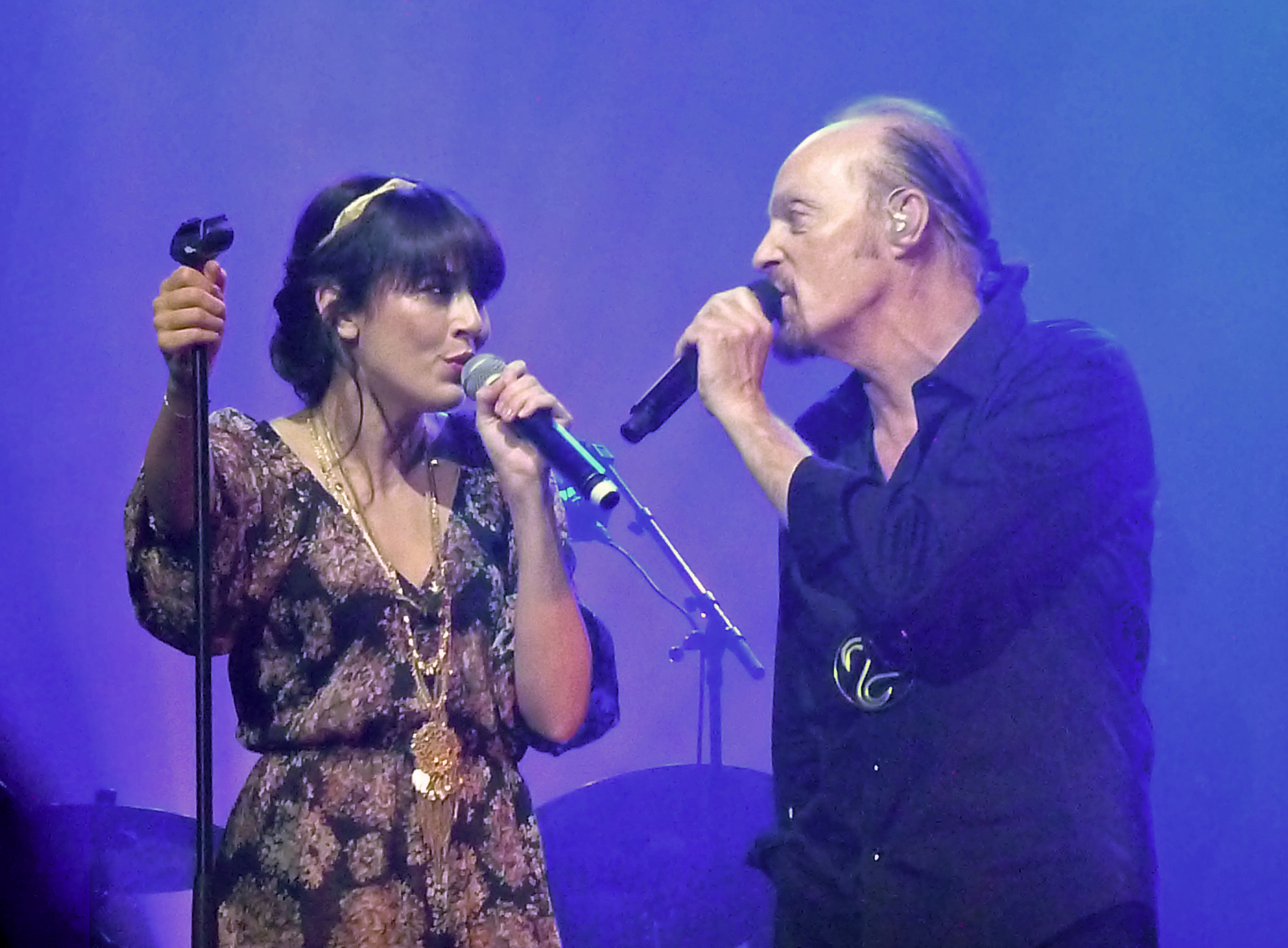
Leroy performing "Brian Boru" with Alan Stivell at the Paris Olympia in France on 16 February 2012

The album was re-released in November 2011 as a Deluxe Edition with seven additional tracks in English, including "Amazing Grace", "Scarborough Fair" and two Mike Oldfield tracks, "Moonlight Shadow" and "To France". The American version of the album, retitled Nolwenn, was released on 8 January 2013 with a different track listing. The album peaked at number 10 on the Billboard's World Album chart. Leroy made her New York City debut at Drom.

As part of the Bretonne Tour, Leroy played over 100 dates in France, Belgium, Switzerland and Germany. In June 2012, she performed as a special guest with The Chieftains in Paris.

==== 2012–2016: Ô Filles de l'Eau ====
Leroy's fifth album, Ô filles de l'eau, was released on 26 November 2012, preceded by the lead single "Juste pour me souvenir". The album was produced by Jon Kelly and recorded in London. The title reads 'O Daughters of the Water' but is phonetically similar to 'au fil de l'eau' ('with the current/flow'). Like Bretonne, it contains Celtic inspired music but with more ocean themed lyrics. It includes two tracks in English ("Homeland" and "Limitless"). "Homeland" contains the James Horner composed theme of the film Braveheart. "Ahès" is the only Breton-language song of the album. Leroy wrote and co-composed 9 songs, including the singles "Juste pour me souvenir", "Sixième continent", "J'ai volé le lit de la mer" and "Ophélia". The album cover was created by Australian artist Vee Speers, inspired by her portrait series, Immortal. Reviews of the album were strong, with some praising Leroy's vocal ability and Celtic music and lyrics, noting that her singing in English and Breton was brave and proved her to be an evolving artist, with strong sales to match. Two months after its release, the album was certified triple platinum by the SNEP. Furthermore, it was named RTL's Album of the Year 2013.

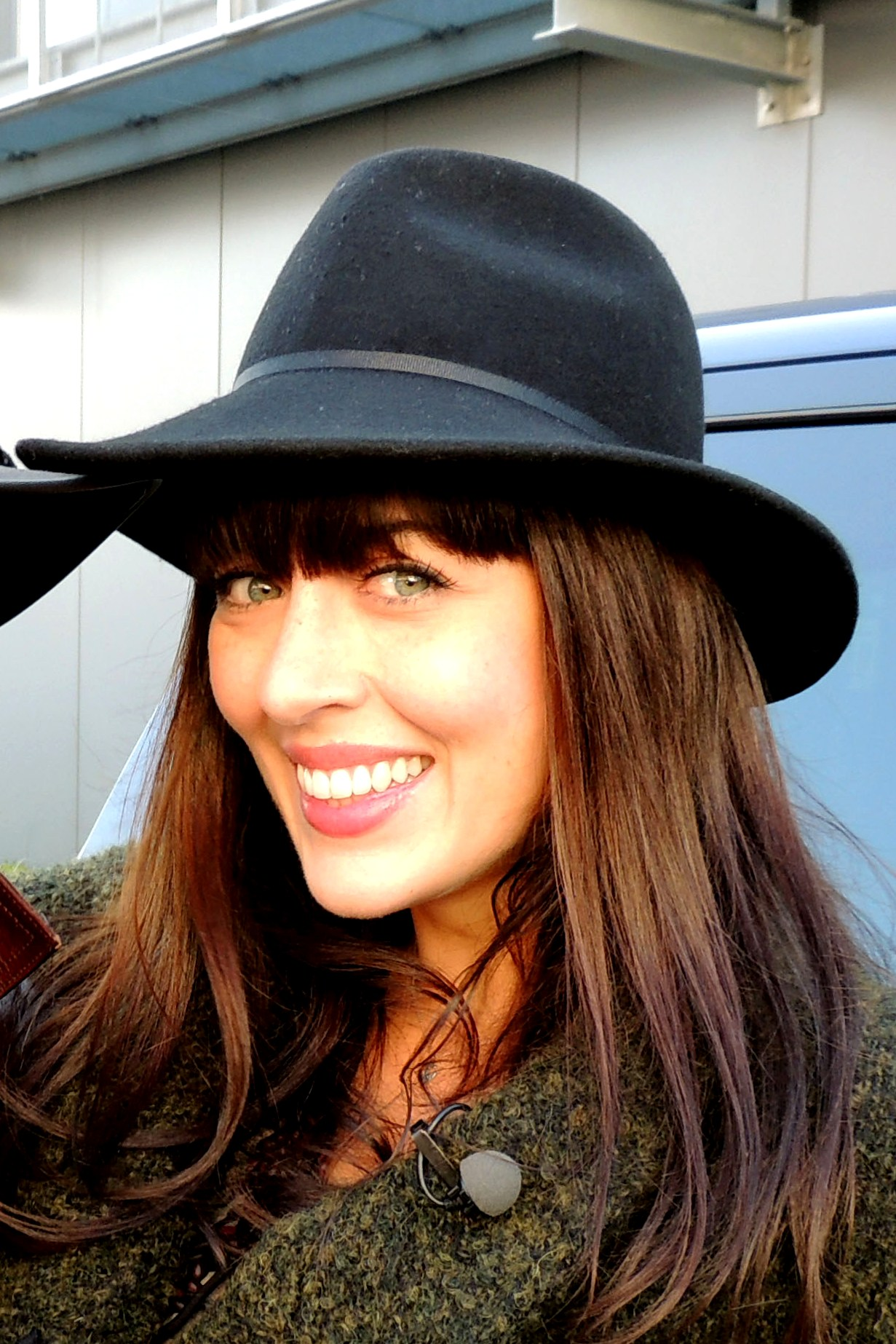
Leroy in Belgium (2013).

In 2013, Leroy toured France, Belgium and Switzerland in support of the album. Additionally, she was a special guest soloist on Vladimir Cosma's symphonic tour in France. In early 2014, she was nominated at the World Music Awards for the first time, in four categories: World's Best Album (Bretonne), World's Best Entertainer, World's Best Female Artist, and World's Best Live Act.

In 2014, she provided several songs in English and French for the Academy Awards-nominated animated film Song of the Sea, and voiced the character of Bronagh in the film's French version. On 3 May 2014, Leroy performed the Breton anthem "Bro Gozh ma Zadoù" at the Stade de France before 80,000 spectators, for the 2014 Coupe de France Final (aired on France 2) opposing two Breton clubs, the Stade Rennais to EA Guingamp.

Leroy's second live CD/DVD, Ô Tour de L'Eau, recorded in Saint-Brieuc, was released on 1 December 2014. In March 2015, she embarked on an acoustic tour in France, Belgium, Switzerland, Germany, New Caledonia and French Polynesia.

On 11 June 2015, she was invited to talk about her career at Oxford University. In November 2015, Leroy announced that she would perform at Celtic Connections in Glasgow's City Halls on 30 January 2016, along with Karen Matheson.

==== 2017–2018: Gemme ====
On 13 May 2017, Leroy released "Gemme", the eponymous lead single from her sixth studio album Gemme (English: Gem) produced in London by Jamie Ellis. The album was released on 1 September 2017. Leroy wrote and co-composed most of the songs. The album features three songs in English: "Run It Down" and two poems by Edgar Allan Poe set to music ("A Dream" and "The Lake"). The other songs are in French. "Stephen" refers to a theory by Stephen Hawking. The album was certified gold in France. A Limited Edition was released on 8 December 2017, including two remixes and two acoustic versions. In March 2018, Leroy embarked on the 55-date Gemme Tour through France, Belgium and Switzerland.

==== 2018–2019: Folk ====
On 2 November 2018, Leroy released a seventh album titled Folk, produced by Clément Ducol. The album consisted of covers of contemporary folk songs, including Graeme Allwright's French adaptation of Suzanne by Leonard Cohen. In March 2019, Leroy embarked on the Folk Tour through France and Belgium. In July 2019, she was a special guest at Pink Martini's concert at Jazz à Juan festival.

==== 2021–present: La Cavale ====
On 2 July 2021, Leroy released the lead single "Brésil, Finistère" from her eighth studio album La Cavale. The album was produced by Benjamin Biolay and released on 12 November 2021. Biolay wrote and composed most of the songs. The second single, "Loin", was released in December 2021.

In January 2022, it was announced that Nolwenn would join The Voice France as a surprise comeback stage coach for its eleventh season. In 2023, she was a coach on The Voice Kids and a member of the jury of the Miss France 2024 contest.

In 2024, she starred in the miniseries Brocéliande, a thriller in six episodes for TF1 directed by Bruno Garcia. The first episode premiered at the Canneseries festival. She won the Audience Choice Award for Best Actress at the Festival de la Fiction in September 2025.

== Medical research ==
Leroy's music was studied for its neurological impact in geriatric populations. Researchers found that Leroy's recordings might have a more beneficial effect than other music, noting that: "the music of Nolwenn Leroy was found to be significantly superior to other music tested". To describe the phenomenon they coined the term the Nolwenn Effect, saying: "the music of Nolwenn Leroy appears to have a different effect on brain-based modulation of gait and stance than other music tested to date".

Mozart and Dutch and French singers were tested; only Mozart and Leroy's music were specified. The U.S. study was completed in February 2008, but no substantial results appear to be published.

== Endorsements ==
In 2011, Leroy appeared in two television commercials for the Nintendo 3DS and she became the face of Pantene for France and Belgium.

== Philanthropy ==
=== Against poverty ===
In 2006, she joined Les Enfoirés charity ensemble and she became godmother of the association La Fondation pour le Logement des Défavorisés (for housing people in need).

=== Diseases ===
In Brittany, she is the sponsor of the operation “Give an Orchid for memory! » which will be held in different E. Leclerc stores in 2013 for the benefit of research against Alzheimer's disease.

=== Other ===
On 27 November 2015, she participated together with Camélia Jordana and Yael Naim at the national memorial day for the victims of the November 2015 Paris attacks singing the song "Quand on n'a que l'amour" from Jacques Brel.

== Personal life ==
Since 2008, she has been in a relationship with Arnaud Clément, former French professional tennis player and captain of the France Davis Cup team.

On 12 July 2017, they welcomed their first child, a son called Marin.

== Discography ==
=== Studio albums ===
| Year | Title | Peak chart positions | | | | | | | | Certifications | Sales |
| Year | Title | FRA | BEL (Wa) | SWI | GER | QC (Fr) | US (World) | KOR | KOR (Int) | Certifications | Sales |
|---|---|---|---|---|---|---|---|---|---|---|---|
| 2003 | Nolwenn | 1 | 1 | 2 | — | — | — | — | — | FRA: 2× Platinum; BEL: Platinum; SWI: Gold | 600,000 |
| 2005 | Histoires Naturelles | 3 | 7 | 44 | — | — | — | — | — | FRA: Platinum; BEL: Gold | 400,000 |
| 2009 | Le Cheshire Cat et moi | 26 | 32 | — | — | — | — | — | — | FRA: Gold | 50,000 |
| 2010 | Bretonne (US title: Nolwenn) | 1 | 1 | 20 | 13 | 9 | 10 | 34 | 9 | FRA: 2× Diamond; BEL: 2× Platinum; SWI: Gold | 1,200,000 |
| 2012 | Ô Filles de l'Eau | 5 | 5 | 35 | 60 | — | — | — | — | FRA: 3× Platinum; BEL: Gold | 350,000 |
| 2017 | Gemme | 3 | 3 | 15 | — | — | — | — | — | FRA: Gold | |
| 2018 | Folk | 6 | 5 | 28 | — | — | — | — | — | FRA: Gold | |
| 2021 | La Cavale | 8 | 7 | 45 | — | — | — | — | — | | |
"—" denotes an album that did not chart or was not released in that territory.

=== Live albums ===
| Year | Title | Peak chart positions | | | |
| Year | Title | FRA | BEL (Wa) | SWI | GER |
|---|---|---|---|---|---|
| 2007 | Histoires Naturelles Tour | 25 | 21 | — | — |
| 2014 | Ô Tour de l'Eau | 26 | 36 | — | — |
"—" denotes an album that did not chart or was not released in that territory.

=== Singles ===
| Year | Title | Peak chart positions | | | Album |
| Year | Title | FRA | BEL (Wa) | SWI | Album |
|---|---|---|---|---|---|
| 2003 | "Cassé" | 1 | 1 | 4 | Nolwenn |
| 2003 | "Une Femme Cachée" | 40 | 23 | 78 | Nolwenn |
| 2003 | "Suivre Une Étoile" | 12 | 24 | 44 | Nolwenn |
| 2004 | "Inévitablement" | 31 | 26 | — | Nolwenn |
| 2006 | "Nolwenn Ohwo !" | 1 | 3 | 29 | Histoires Naturelles |
| 2006 | "Histoire Naturelle" | 30 | 39 | — | Histoires Naturelles |
| 2006 | "Mon Ange" | 14 (Note: "Mon Ange" was only released digitally and peaked at number 14 on the French singles downloads chart.) | 6* | — | Histoires Naturelles |
| 2007 | "J'aimais Tant L'Aimer" | — | — | — | Histoires Naturelles |
| 2007 | "Reste Encore" | — | — | — | Histoires Naturelles |
| 2009 | "Faut-il, Faut-il Pas ?" | — | 6* | — | Le Cheshire Cat et moi |
| 2010 | "Textile Schizophrénie" | — | — | — | Le Cheshire Cat et moi |
| 2010 | "Suite Sudarmoricaine" | — | 19* | — | Bretonne |
| 2010 | "Mná na h-Éireann" | — | 25* | — | Bretonne |
| 2010 | "La Jument de Michao" | 36 | 13 | — | Bretonne |
| 2011 | "Tri Martolod" | 51 | 29 | — | Bretonne |
| 2011 | "Brest" | — | 42 | — | Bretonne |
| 2011 | "Moonlight Shadow" | 48 | 32 | — | Bretonne (Deluxe Edition) |
| 2012 | "Juste pour me souvenir" | 43 | 13 | — | Ô Filles de l'Eau |
| 2013 | "Sixième continent" | — | 11* | — | Ô Filles de l'Eau |
| 2013 | "J'ai volé le lit de la mer" | — | 4* | — | Ô Filles de l'Eau |
| 2014 | "Ophélia" (Live) | — | 12* | — | Ô Tour de l'eau |
| 2017 | "Gemme" | 28 | 7* | — | Gemme |
| 2017 | "Bien plus précieux" | 91 | — | — | Gemme |
| 2017 | "Ce que je suis" | 95 | — | — | Gemme |
| 2017 | "Trace ton chemin" | — | 4* | — | Gemme |
| 2021 | "Brésil, Finistère" | — | 45 | — | La cavale |
| 2021 | "Loin" | — | — | — | La cavale |
"—" denotes a single that did not chart or was not released in that territory.

* Belgium Ultratip

=== Other charted songs ===
| Year | Title | Peak chart positions | Album |
| Year | Title | FRA | Album |
|---|---|---|---|
| 2017 | "Quelque chose de Tennessee" | 96 | On a tous quelque chose de Johnny |

=== Music videos ===
| Year | Title |
|---|---|
| 2003 | "Cassé" |
| 2003 | "Une femme cachée" |
| 2003 | "Suivre une étoile" |
| 2004 | "Inévitablement" |
| 2004 | "Le dernier mot" |
| 2005 | "Nolwenn Ohwo !" |
| 2006 | "Histoire Naturelle" |
| 2006 | "Mon Ange" |
| 2009 | "Faut-il, faut-il pas ?" |
| 2010 | "Mná na h-Éireann" (Women of Ireland) |
| 2010 | "La Jument de Michao" |
| 2011 | "Tri Martolod" |
| 2012 | "Juste pour me souvenir" |
| 2013 | "Sixième continent" |
| 2017 | "Gemme" |
| 2021 | "Brésil, Finistère" |

=== Other charted songs ===
| Year | Title | Peak chart positions | | | Album |
| Year | Title | FRA | BEL (Wa) | SWI | Album |
|---|---|---|---|---|---|
| 2014 | "La ballade nord-irlandaise" | 142 | — | — | La Bande à Renaud |
| 2016 | "Un enfant assis attend la pluie" | 135 | — | — | Balavoine(s) |
"—" denotes a recording that did not chart or was not released in that territory.

=== As featured artist ===
| Year | Title | Peak chart positions | | | Album |
| Year | Title | FRA | BEL (Wa) | SWI | Album |
|---|---|---|---|---|---|
| 2007 | "Aimer à perdre la raison" (with Les Enfoirés) | — | 22 | — | La Caravane des Enfoirés |
| 2007 | "L'amitié" (with Les Enfoirés) | — | 7 | — | Les secrets des Enfoirés |
| 2012 | "Without You" (with Les Enfoirés) | 91 | 49 | — | Le bal des Enfoirés |
| 2012 | "Attention au départ" (with Les Enfoirés) | 5 | 3 | 49 | La boîte à musique des Enfoirés |
| 2013 | "Jeanne" (with Les Enfoirés) | 44 | 25 | — | La boîte à musique des Enfoirés |
| 2014 | "Laissez-nous chanter" (with Les Enfoirés) | 196 | — | — | Bon anniversaire les Enfoirés |
| 2014 | "Dès que le vent soufflera" (collective) | 96 | 14* | — | La Bande à Renaud |
| 2014 | "Lucie" (duet with Francis Cabrel) | 193 | — | — | Kiss & Love |
"—" denotes a recording that did not chart or was not released in that territory.

=== Soundtracks ===
- 2012: Die Wanderhure – Best Of (German TV movies)
- 2014: Song of the Sea (Original Motion Picture Soundtrack) and its French version Le Chant de la Mer

== Filmography ==
- 2012: Rise of the Guardians by Peter Ramsey: French voice of Tooth Fairy
- 2014: Song of the Sea by Tomm Moore: French voice of Bronagh
- 2021: Capitaine Marleau by Josée Dayan (TV series, 1 episode): Déborah
- 2024: Brocéliande by Bruno Garcia (miniseries, 6 episodes): Fanny Legoff
- 2026: L'Été 36 by Fred Garson (miniseries, 6 episodes): Giulia Vincent
- 2027: Il ne se passe jamais rien ici by Hippolyte Dard (miniseries, 6 episodes): Claire

== Voice acting ==
- 2013: Lady Ô (evening show at the Futuroscope), the storyteller

== Horse riding ==
Leroy owns a horse named El Aberkan. She showed her horse riding and jumping skills on unfamiliar horses a couple of times for French TV shows broadcast on France 2, including the 50th Gala de l'Union des Artistes charity in 2011, alongside Alexis Gruss.

== Awards and nominations ==
| Year | Award | Category | Result |
|---|---|---|---|
| 2004 | NRJ Music Awards | Francophone Breakthrough of the Year | Won |
| 2006 | Étoiles Chérie FM | Étoile de la Sensibilité | Won |
| 2006 | Étoiles Chérie FM | Étoile Chérie FM | Won |
| 2006 | Étoiles Chérie FM | Song of the Year for Mon Ange | Won |
| 2007 | Étoiles Chérie FM | Female Artist of the Year | Won |
| 2007 | France Bleu Talents | Audience Choice Prize | Won |
| 2010 | Le Télégramme | Grand Prix du Disque for Bretonne | Won |
| 2011 | Le Télégramme | Breton of the Year | Won |
| 2011 | Planète Musique Mag (France 2) | Planète Musique Mag d'or | Won |
| 2011 | RTL – Metronews | RTL Album of the Year for Bretonne | Nominated |
| 2011 | RTL – Le Parisien | Person of the Year | Won |
| 2012 | NRJ Music Awards | Francophone Female Artist of the Year | Nominated |
| 2012 | NRJ Music Awards | Francophone Song of the Year for Tri martolod | Nominated |
| 2012 | NRJ Music Awards | Best-selling Francophone Album of the Year for Bretonne | Won |
| 2012 | Victoires de la Musique | Female Artist of the Year | Nominated |
| 2012 | Globes de Cristal Award | Best Female Act | Nominated |
| 2012 | Bro Gozh ma Zadoù | Prix Bro Gozh ma Zadoù | Won |
| 2013 | NRJ Music Awards | Francophone Female Artist of the Year | Nominated |
| 2013 | Globes de Cristal Award | Best Female Act | Nominated |
| 2013 | Grands Prix de l'UNAC (National union of songwriters and composers) | Grand Prix de l'UNAC for the song Juste pour me souvenir | Won |
| 2013 | RTL – Metronews | RTL Album of the Year for Ô filles de l'eau | Won |
| 2014 | World Music Awards | World's Best Album for Bretonne | Nominated |
| 2014 | World Music Awards | World's Best Entertainer | Nominated |
| 2014 | World Music Awards | World's Best Female Artist | Nominated |
| 2014 | World Music Awards | World's Best Live Act | Nominated |
| 2017 | NRJ Music Awards | Francophone Female Artist of the Year | Nominated |
| 2017 | RTL | RTL Album of the Year for Gemme | Nominated |
| 2018 | Globes de Cristal Award | Best Female Act | Nominated |
| 2022 | RTL | RTL Album of the Year for La Cavale | Nominated |
| 2025 | Festival de la Fiction - Télé-Loisirs | Audience Choice Award for Best Actress for Brocéliande | Won |
| 2026 | Festival de la Fiction - Télé-Loisirs | Audience Choice Award for Best Actress for L'Été 36 | Won |

== Honours ==
Officer of the Ordre des Arts et des Lettres (2021).

Knight of the Order of the Legion of Honour (2025).

The main belt asteroid 353232 Nolwenn was named after Leroy.

In 2012, her wax figure was unveiled at the Musée Grévin in Paris.

== Bibliography ==
- Castellss, Patrick; Abramowitz, Christophe (2005). Nolwenn Leroy (in French). Télémaque. ISBN 978-2-7533-0024-8.
- Bourdelas, Laurent (2012). Alan Stivell. Brest: Éd. "Le Télégramme". ISBN 978-2-84833-274-1.

== Footnotes ==
| Preceded by Jenifer Bartoli | Winner of Star Academy France; 2002 | Succeeded by Élodie Frégé |
