= J'ai vu le loup =

French folk song

Song
- Language: French
- English title: I saw the wolf
- Genre: Folk song

J'ai vu le loup ("I saw the wolf") is a French folk song, and also a nursery rhyme. Due to it having been transmitted orally, it is difficult to pinpoint its exact origin, though the earliest versions date back to the High Middle Ages. Many versions exist in the French-speaking world, both in langue d'oc and langue d'oïl.

The lyrics vary among versions, but always include a peasant having seen a wolf at the head of a list of other animals, and having seen the wolf (and other animals) behave in a human-like manner, such as partaking in drink, dance and song.

== Versions ==
=== J'ai vu le loup, le renard, le lièvre (Burgundy) ===
The lyrics evoke the participation of a peasant musician in a celebration, perhaps a Sabbath, held deep in the woods by members of the upper classes, designated by animal figures (or masks). It ends with the Latin invocation Miserere ("have mercy upon me."). Melodically, it is a parody of the liturgical Dies iræ; its origins date back to the 15th century in the country of Beaune and there are numerous variations in the French regions. It is also sung as a nursery rhyme as these songs could express, for example, the fear of wolves or, at least, exorcise this fear in children. Composer Maurice Emmanuel included a classical piano setting in his collection Trente Chansons bourguignonnes du Pays de Beaune, at the beginning of the 20th century.

==== Lyrics (Old French, Burgundian dialect) ====
J'ai vu le loup, le renard, le lièvre
J'ai vu le loup, le renard cheuler
C'est moi-même qui les ai rebeuillés
J'ai vu le loup, le renard, le lièvre
C'est moi-même qui les ai rebeuillés
J'ai vu le loup, le renard, le lièvre

J'ai ouï le loup, le renard, le lièvre
J'ai ouï le loup, le renard chanter
C'est moi-même qui les ai rechignés
J'ai ouï le loup, le renard, le lièvre
C'est moi-même qui les ai rechignés
J'ai ouï le loup, le renard chanter

J'ai vu le loup, le renard, le lièvre
J'ai vu le loup, le renard danser
C'est moi-même qui les ai revirés
J'ai ouï le loup, le renard, le lièvre
C'est moi-même qui les ai revirés
J'ai vu le loup, le renard danser

Miserere

Translation:

I saw the wolf, the fox and the hare
I saw the wolf and the fox get drunk
It was I who saw them
I saw the wolf, the fox and the hare
It was I who saw them
I saw the wolf, the fox and the hare

I heard the wolf, the fox and the hare
I heard the wolf and the fox sing
It was I who imitated them
I heard the wolf, the fox and the hare
It was I who imitated them
I heard the wolf and the fox sing

I saw the wolf, the fox and the hare
I saw the wolf and the fox dance
It was I who made them dance
I heard the wolf, the fox and the hare
It was I who made them dance
I saw the wolf and the fox dance

Have mercy on me

=== Ai vist lo lop, lo rainard, la lèbre (Occitania) ===
This version is estimated to date from the 13th century, and has been transmitted orally since then until the 21st century, as a nursery rhyme. This is the most detailed and crude version. Here, it describes not the participation but the testimony of a peasant outraged by the notables' revelry. Sexual metaphors suggest an orgy: dancing around the tree (phallus) and around the leafy bush (vulva). The second verse expresses the anger of this hard-working peasant, scandalized by the debauchery of the elites, with crude words. The little money earned is too quickly "shoved up the ass".

==== Lyrics (Provençal) ====
Ai vist lo lop, lo rainard, la lèbre
Ai vist lo lop, lo rainard dançar
Totei tres fasián lo torn de l'aubre
Ai vist lo lop, lo rainard, la lèbre
Totei tres fasián lo torn de l'aubre
Fasián lo torn dau boisson folhat

Aquí trimam tota l'annada
per se ganhar quauquei sòus
Rèn que dins una mesada
Ai vist lo lop, lo rainard, la lèbre
Nos i fotèm tot pel cuol
Ai vist la lèbre, lo rainard, lo lop

Translation:

I saw the wolf, the fox and the hare
I saw the wolf and the fox dance
All three were dancing around the tree
I saw the wolf, the fox and the hare
All three were dancing around the tree
They were dancing around the leafy bush

Here we work throughout the year
just to make a bit of coin
And just in one month
I saw the wolf, the fox and the hare
We've shoved it up the ass (squandered)
I saw the hare, the fox and the wolf

=== La Jument de Michao (Brittany) ===
The song has been known in Upper Brittany for many centuries, but it wasn't until the folk revival of the 1970s, when the song was recorded as La Jument de Michao, or J'entends le loup, le renard et la belette, by the folk group Kouerien in 1973. The rendition by Tri Yann on their 1976 album La Découverte ou l'Ignorance, made it reach a wider audience, which has spawned various adaptations.

==== Lyrics (Modern French) ====
C'est dans dix ans je m'en irai
J'entends le loup et le renard chanter

C'est dans dix ans je m'en irai
J'entends le loup et le renard chanter

J'entends le loup, le renard et la belette
J'entends le loup et le renard chanter

J'entends le loup, le renard et la belette
J'entends le loup et le renard chanter

C'est dans neuf ans je m'en irai
La jument de Michao a passé dans le pré

La jument de Michao et son petit poulain
A passé dans le pré et mangé tout le foin

L'hiver viendra les gars, l'hiver viendra
La jument de Michao, elle s'en repentira

Translation:

It's in ten years I will leave
I hear the wolf and the fox sing

It's in ten years I will leave
I hear the wolf and the fox sing

I hear the wolf, the fox and the weasel
I hear the wolf and the fox sing

I hear the wolf, the fox and the weasel
I hear the wolf and the fox sing

It's in nine years I will leave
Michao's mare passed through the meadow

Michao's mare and her little foal
Went through the meadow and ate all the hay

Winter will come guys, winter will come
Michao's mare, she will repent

=== Le loup, le renard et la belette (Acadia) ===
The most well known Cajun version is musically very close to the Breton version, but lyrically to the Occitan version. Here again, someone testifies to a secret party reserved for a social elite. The sexual imagery is more explicit, together with the presence and undoubtedly the exploitation of a child which shocks the narrator, who imagines his own in his place. In some versions, the child (“enfant”) is replaced by another woman (“une autre femme”), implying witnessing infidelity rather than child endangerment.

==== Lyrics (Modern French) ====
J'ai vu le loup, le renard et la belette
J'ai vu le loup et le renard danser
J'ai vu le loup, le renard et la belette
J'ai vu le loup et le renard danser

Je les ai vus taper leurs mains
Je les ai vus taper leurs mains
Je les ai vus taper leurs pieds
Je les ai vus taper leurs pieds

Je les ai vus qu'ils s'embrassaient
Je les ai vus qu'ils s'embrassaient
Je les ai vus qu'ils se caressaient
Je les ai vus qu'ils se caressaient

Je les ai vus avec une enfant
Je les ai vus avec une enfant
Merci bon Dieu c'était pas la mienne
Merci bon Dieu c'était pas la mienne

Translation:

I saw the wolf, the fox and the weasel
I saw the wolf and the fox dancing
I saw the wolf, the fox and the weasel
I saw the wolf and the fox dancing

I saw them clap their hands
I saw them clap their hands
I saw them stamp their feet
I saw them stamp their feet

I saw them kissing
I saw them kissing
I saw them caressing each other
I saw them caressing each other

I saw them with a child
I saw them with a child
Thank God it wasn't mine
Thank God it wasn't mine

=== Le loup, le renard, le lièvre (Québec) ===
There are only two verses left in the Canadian version. They are sung while tapping their feet to make people dance. It is usually coupled with another song to serve as a chorus, specifically with the songs Derrière chez-nous y a-t-un étang and En revenant de Saint-André . In both cases, the melody remains the same, and the song is called Le loup, le renard, le lièvre.

==== Lyrics (Québec French) ====
Derrière chez-nous y a-t-un étang
J'ai vu le loup, le renard passer (bis)
Trois beaux canards s'en vont baignant.

(Refrain)
Et pis tape et pis tape,
Et pis roule et pis roule,
Et pis frappe et pis frappe,
Et pis tape et pis roule,
Et pis tape la ribidoune
Et pis tapoche encore.

J'ai vu le loup, le renard, le lièvre
J'ai vu le loup, le renard passer (bis)
Trois beaux canards s'en vont baignant
J'ai vu le loup, le renard passer (bis)
Le fils du roi s'en va chassant,

Refrain

Le fils du roi s'en va chassant,
J'ai vu le loup, le renard passer (bis)
Avec son grand fusil d'argent,

Refrain

Avec son grand fusil d'argent,
J'ai vu le loup, le renard passer (bis)
Visa le noir, tua le blanc,

Refrain

Toutes ses plumes s'en vont au vent,
J'ai vu le loup, le renard passer (bis)
Trois dames s'en vont les ramassant,

Refrain

C'est pour en faire un lit de camp,
J'ai vu le loup, le renard passer (bis)
Pour y coucher tous les passants,

Refrain

Translation:

Behind our house is there a pond
I saw the wolf, the fox pass (repeat)
Three beautiful ducks go swimming.

(Chorus)
And then tap and then tap,
And then roll and then roll,
And then hits and worse hits,
And then hit and roll,
And then hit the ribidoune
And then tap again.

I saw the wolf, the fox, the hare
I saw the wolf, the fox pass (repeat)
Three beautiful ducks go swimming
I saw the wolf, the fox pass (repeat)
The king's son goes hunting,

Chorus

The king's son goes hunting,
I saw the wolf, the fox pass (repeat)
With his great silver gun,

Chorus

With his great silver gun,
I saw the wolf, the fox pass (repeat)
Aimed at the black, killed the white,

Chorus

All its feathers blow away in the wind,
I saw the wolf, the fox pass (repeat)
Three ladies go and pick them up,

Chorus

It's to make a camp bed,
I saw the wolf, the fox pass (repeat)
To sleep all the passers-by there,

Chorus

== Notable recordings ==
- "J'ai vu le loup, le renard chanter" (parody of liturgical Dies Irae) Le Poème Harmonique, Vincent Dumestre
- "J'ai vu le loup" (instrumental), Les Musiciens de Saint-Julien
- "J'ai vu le loup", on Nouveau Monde by Patricia Petibon
- "J'ai vu le loup", on Ballads by Custer La Rue
- "J'ai vu le loup", BeauSoleil, Michael Doucet
- "J'ai Vu Le Loup, Le Renard Et La Belette" by Balfa Brothers
- "J'ai vû le loup", on La Roque and Roll: Popular Music of Renaissance France by The Baltimore Consort
- "Ai Vist Lo Lop - Medieval Occitan Song" by Farya Faraji
