= Terra Celta =

Brazilian celtic rock musical group

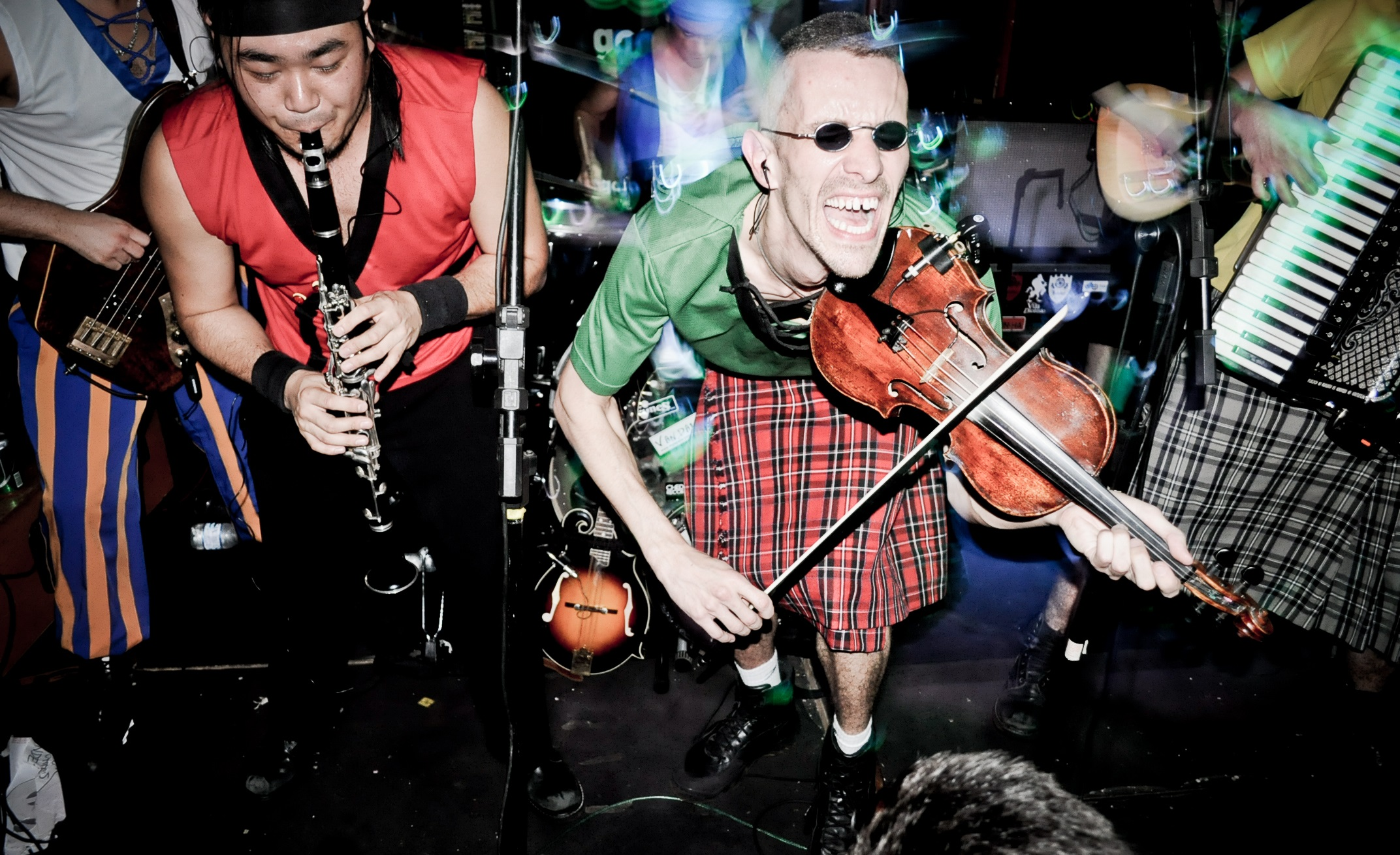
- Terra Celta live at Casa Fora do Eixo in Uberlândia in 2010. Edgar Nakandakari (no longer in the band) is to the left and Elcio Oliveira is to the right. Behind them is Luiz Fernando Sardo. Partially cut out of the picture are Bruno Guimarães (far right) and Alexandre Garcia (far left). Eduardo Brancalion is not shown.

Background information
- Origin: Londrina, Paraná, Brazil
- Genres: Celtic rock, comedy rock
- Years active: 2005–present
- Members: Elcio Oliveira; Alexandre "Arrigo" Garcia; Luiz Fernando Sardo; Eduardo Brancalion; Bruno Guimarães
- Past members: Edgar Nakandakari
- Website: www.terracelta.com.br

Terra Celta ("Celtic Land") is a Brazilian Celtic comedy rock band formed in 2005, and based in Londrina, Paraná. They are noted for making Celtic rock in Portuguese language (initially English), with often humorous lyrics. The group performs live with traditional Celtic/Irish clothing. Besides performing Irish music, the members also research the subject, by attending Celtic music festivals in Europe.

== History ==
All members live in Londrina, but not all of them were born there: Alexandre is from Astorga, Edgar is from Limeira, Bruno is from Jundiaí and Elcio is from Sorocaba. In 2005, vocalist Elcio Oliveira (who is also a general practitioner at a health center in Londrina) was in São Paulo and met Ricardo (Rik) Dias, who was already working with Celtic music at the time. There, they went to a show by Irish band The Murphy's Law and Elcio decided to form a similar band. Back to Londrina, he joined his acquaintance, accordionist Alexandre Garcia, and together they formed the band, though still without bassist Bruno Guimarães and guitarist Eduardo Brancalion.

Their first shows were in Londrina itself, often sold out. When Guimarães and Brancalion arrived, they started working with lyrics in Portuguese and their first song was "O Porco"(Rik Dias). In the beginning, the band had to buy their instruments abroad or ask for friends to bring them from other countries, but this is no longer necessary since the band can buy them via the internet.

The band's debut album, No Sintoma (2007), was a cover album with traditional instrumentals or songs in English language. Its 2010 follow-up had original compositions in Portuguese language. It was titled Folkatrua, a word play and portmanteau of "Folk" and "Falcatrua" (scam), based on the fact that the band doest not limit itself to folk music, in spite of many labeling them as such. All tracks from both albums can be freely downloaded from the band's official website.

In 2014, the band performed at the sixth edition of Rock in Rio Lisboa and was informally invited to perform at Rock in Rio Las Vegas. Later, the invitation was made official and they are expected to play on 8, 9, 15 and 16 May.

In 2018, the band performed at Odin's Krieger Fest in the Curitiba, Porto Alegre and São Paulo legs, alongside Faun, Metsatöll and Confraria da Costa.

On 16 March 2022, they announced the departure of multi-instrumentalist Edgar Nakandakari.

== Discography ==
=== Albums ===
- No Sintoma (2007)
- Folkatrua (2010)
- Terra Celta (2010)

== Members ==
=== Current ===
- Elcio Oliveira – vocals, violin, bagpipes e nyckelharpa
- Eduardo Brancalion – electric and acoustic guitars, bouzouki
- Bruno Guimarães – bass
- Alexandre "Arrigo" Garcia – accordion
- Luiz Fernando Sardo – drums and percussion

=== Former ===
- Edgar Nakandakari – banjo, mandolin, tin whistle, clarinet, bagpipes and hurdy-gurdy (2005–2022)
