= Portraits (Tri Yann album) =

Studio album by Tri Yann
- Released: 1995
- Recorded: 1995
- Genre: Celtic music
- Length: 65:01
- Label: Déclic
- Producer: Gérard Goron

Tri Yann chronology
Inventaire Vol.2 (1995)	Portraits (1995)	Tri Yann en Concert (1996)

Portraits is a concept album by Breton band Tri Yann. It was released in 1995 under the Déclic label.

All the songs on the album are about a historical person. Some, like the tracks in honor of Brian Boru and Gerry Adams, are purely instrumental, while some contain Old French lyrics. The last third of the songs in the album concern Guillaume Seznec.

The album was recorded at l'Abbaye Royale de Fontevraud. It also marks the arrival of Christophe Le Helley into the group, which would give the band a more medieval sound, as well as a rare appearance by former member Bernard Baudriller.

== Track listing ==
1. Marie-Camille Lehuédé
2. Madeleine Bernard
3. Gerry Adams
4. Arthur Plantagenest
5. Goulven Salaü
6. Olivier Herry
7. Brian Boru
8. Aloïda
9. Anne de Bretagne
10. Guillaume Seznec:

- Le Voyage
- Le Procès
- L'Adieu
- Le Bagne
- La Délivrance
- Seznec est innocent!
