= La Tribu de Dana =

Song by Manau

Single by Manau

from the album Panique celtique
- B-side: "L'avenir est un long passé"
- Released: 1998
- Genre: Hip hop, pop
- Length: 4:47
- Label: Polydor
- Songwriters: Martial Tricoche, Cédric Soubiron, Hervé Lardic
- Producer: Manau

Manau singles chronology
"La Tribu de Dana" (1998)	"Panique celtique" (1998)

"La Tribu de Dana" (pronounced [la tʁiby də dana], literally Dana's tribe) is a 1998 song by French hip hop band Manau for their debut album Panique celtique, on which it features as the second track. Initially released as a single in July 1998, it was an immediate success, particularly in France, where it topped singles charts for many months and became one of the best-selling singles in France at the time.

== Lyrics and music ==
In France, this song created a new style of music, combining French rap and Breton melodies. Verses have hip hop sonorities, while the refrain, uses the Breton traditional melody line from Alan Stivell's famous 1970s folk hit "Tri Martolod". Stivell sued the group, but Manau maintained that the song was simply a baseline, and was modified enough to not be considered plagiarism.

Distributed by Polydor, the song was composed by the members of the band : Martial Tricoche, Cédric Soubiron and Hervé Lardic. Lyrics are about the Armorican Breton tribe of Dana — which refers to the name of the Dagna god's daughter — narrating an epic war carried out by this tribe. The story is told by the only survivor of this war, who becomes thus the tribe's king. The tribe of Dana is a group of figures in Irish mythology, also described in L'épopée Celte. See also Danu (Irish goddess).

In 2006, the song was covered by Catherine Lara, Jean-Baptiste Maunier, Natasha St-Pier, Francis Cabrel and Zazie. This version features as 13th track on the album 2006: Le Village des Enfoirés, released on 7 April 2006 by Les Enfoirés.

== Chart performances ==
On the French Singles Chart, the song has the characteristic of having remained for 23 weeks in the top three, while it featured on the chart (top 100) for 27 weeks. It went straight to number three on 9 May 1998, reached the top in its seventh week and stayed there for 12 consecutive weeks. Then it was number two for five weeks, then dropped very quickly. It was certified Diamond disc by the SNEP, the French certifier, and was ranked at number two on the 1998 Year-End Chart.

In Belgium (Wallonia), the song charted for 39 weeks on the Ultratop 40. It debuted at the bottom of the chart and managed to reach number one top from its 9th to its 16th week, before dropping slowly. It totaled 25 weeks in the top ten and featured at number three on the Annual Chart. To date, it is the fourth biggest hit since 1995 in Belgium (Wallonia).

In Belgium (Flanders), "La Tribu de Dana" entered the chart on 26 September, and reached a peak of number four for four weeks. After that, it almost did not stop to drop and fell off the chart (top 50) after 18 weeks. The song was the 26th best-selling single of the year.

The song also featured for 21 weeks on the Dutch Singles Chart (top 100) from 12 September 1998. It started at number 70 and steadily climbed on the chart until hitting number three for four weeks, then began to drop.

"La Tribu de Dana" was charted in December 1999 in Germany, but achieved a very small success, peaking at number 89.

== Track listings ==
- CD single
1. "La Tribu de Dana" — 4:47
2. "L'avenir est un long passé" — 4:40

== Charts ==
=== Weekly charts ===
Chart (1998–1999)	Peak position
Belgian (Flanders) Singles Chart	4
Belgian (Wallonia) Singles Chart	1
Dutch Top 40	2
French SNEP Singles Chart	1
German Singles Chart	89

=== Year-end charts ===
Chart (1998)	Position
Belgian (Flanders) Singles Chart	26
Belgian (Wallonia) Singles Chart	3
Dutch Top 40	14
French Singles Chart	2

== Certifications ==
Region	Certification	Certified units/sales
Belgium (BRMA)	3× Platinum	90,000^{*}
France (SNEP)	Diamond	750,000^{*}
Netherlands (NVPI)	Gold	50,000^{^}
Switzerland (IFPI Switzerland)	Gold	25,000^{^}
^{*} Sales figures based on certification alone.^{^} Shipments figures based on certification alone.

== See also ==
- French pop music
