= Manau (band) =

French hip-hop group

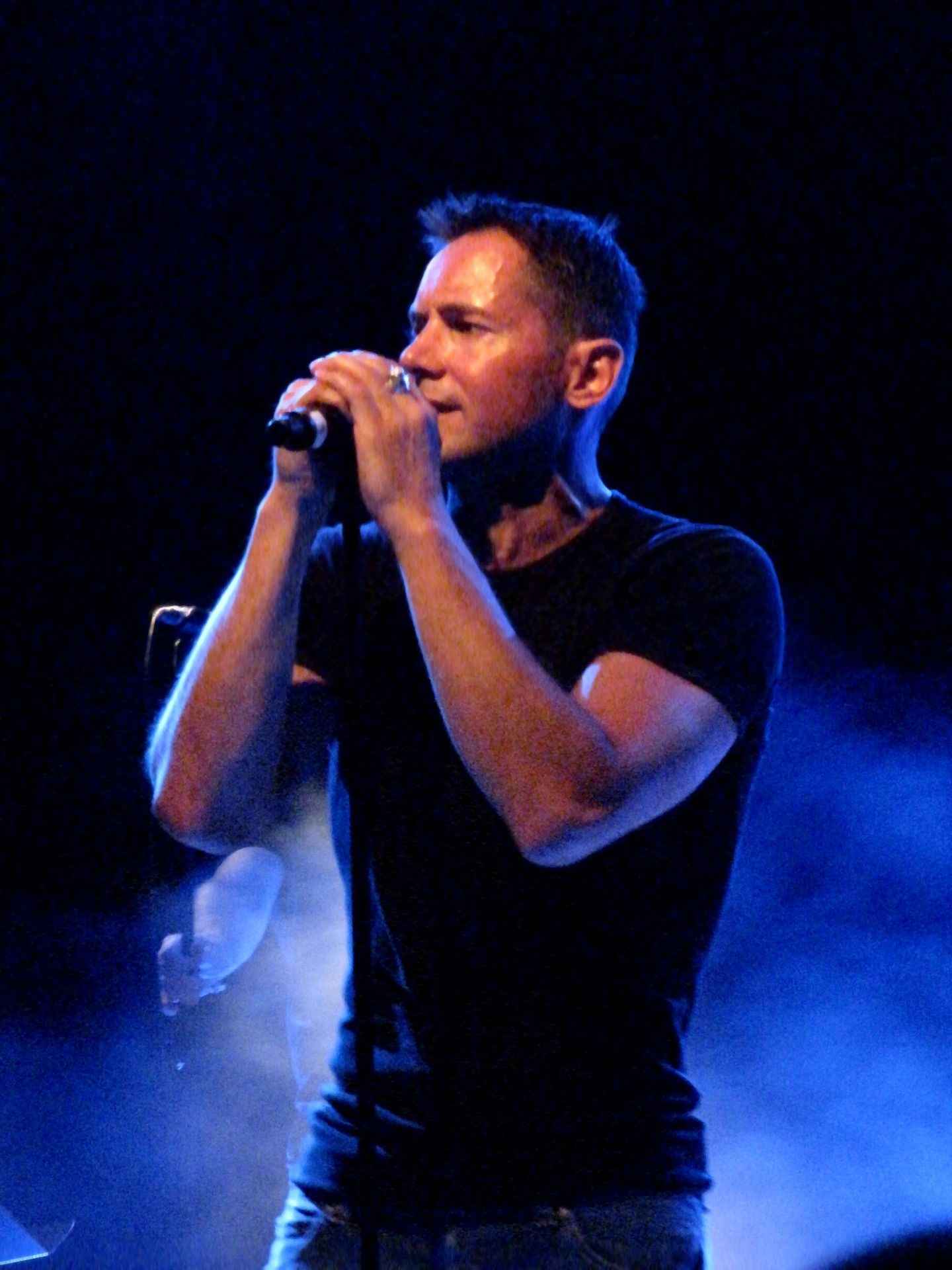
- Manau at the Sons d'une nuit d'été festival (Nuits Saint Georges, France) on 10 July 2010.

Background information
- Origin: Brittany
- Genres: French hip-hop
- Years active: 1998–present
- Members: Martial Tricoche; Cédric Soubiron
- Past members: Hervé Lardic; Bruno le Rouzic; Grégor Gandon; Éric Traissard; Loïc Taillebrest; Marion Elan Trigo

Manau (French pronunciation: [mano]) is a Breton hip-hop band formed in 1998, known for their fusing of traditional Celtic melodies with modern hip-hop beats. It was initially composed of Martial Tricoche, Cédric Soubiron, and Hervé "R.V." Lardic until Lardic's departure and replacement by Gregor Gandon. Although the band is currently based in Paris, all of the members can trace their roots back to Brittany. The group's name comes from the old Gaelic name for the Isle of Man.

== Band history ==
=== The beginning ===
In 1988, Martial and Cédric began hosting a radio show on a local FM station, with Martial rapping in the show and Cédric as DJ. The show ended after two years but built up a following of fans. When the show ended, Cédric managed to get a job at the radio station Skyrock.

Several years later, Cédric met R.V., who had come into the station to perform a live session with his group MeanWhile. R.V. had just finished seven years of schooling at the Paris Conservatoire, and was now able to play guitar, bass, accordion, and keyboard. Cédric and R.V. began discussing the formation of a group.

Meanwhile, Martial had been developing a career as a songwriter. He was introduced to Celtic culture and was influenced by the work of Breton folk stars such as Dan Ar Braz, Yann-Fanch Kemener and the group Tri Yann. Martial's early songs were also greatly influenced by Jean Markale's novel L'épopée Celte, an account of ancient Celtic folklore, peopled with Druids and Celtic warlords.

=== Formation as a group ===
Shortly after Cédric and R.V.'s meeting, they teamed up with Martial to form the group Manau. They set to work on a fusion of Celtic rhythms and rap beats. They were offered a recording contract by Polydor.

The band set to work on their new single, "La Tribu de Dana" and it was released in May 1998. The song rocketed to the top of the charts, selling a huge 1.7 million copies to date, 1.5 million of them in the first few months after its release. "La tribu de Dana" means "the tribe of Dana," and is the name of a group of figures in Irish mythology, also described in L'épopée Celte.

The chorus of Manau's single was actually a cover of the melody line from Alan Stivell's 1970s folk hit Tri Martolod. Stivell promptly sued the group. Manau maintains that the song was simply a baseline, and was modified enough to not be considered plagiarism.

=== Success ===
Marketing directors at Polydor were encouraged by the single's success and asked the band to create a debut album. They enlisted the help of Loïc Taillebrest, a folk musician known for his performances on the bagpipes and the bombarde.

They went on to finish their debut album, Panique celtique, after just a few weeks' work in the studio. The album was released in July 1998 and soared to the top of the French album charts, selling over 500,000 copies almost immediately and reaching the one million mark a year later.

Manau's popularity increased exponentially. They were soon invited to several music festivals, including the famous Francofolies festival in la Rochelle, and the annual music festival in Marseille. They also were able to perform with the French folk group Tri Yann at the Saint-Renan festival in Brittany.

=== 1999 Victoires de la Musique ===
The group embarked upon a major national tour at the beginning of 1999 and, right in the middle of the tour, received the award for Best Rap/Groove Album of the year at Victoires de la Musique (the annual French Music Awards) held in Paris in February. The group claimed their win felt "pretty weird" as, with the music they make, they didn't see themselves as "truly representative of rap as a genre". The group's win also garnered criticism from rap groups such as IAM, Fonky Family, and NTM who called into question the judgement of the "Victoires de la Musique". Manau also faced ridicule from rappers who doubted their talent in rap.

=== Changes ===
Shortly after the group received the award for Best Rap/Groove Album of the year at Victoires de la Musique, Hervé decided to leave the group and devote himself to his old band MeanWhile.

=== Further albums ===
Manau came storming back into the French music news in the autumn of 2000 with a second album entitled Fest Noz de Paname. Manau spent a year in the studio perfecting their sound and, after eight months of practically non-stop touring, their sound had matured considerably. Moving away from the "Celtic rap fusion" style which had made their name, the group began experimenting with new genres and working with different artists. Their second album includes two "duets" with Maurane and Dee Dee Bridgewater. The success was not what was expected, but still enormous. The departure of RV was noticeable on this album. The style was more blues/jazz and less Celtic, but not to the extent of that of the next album on peut tous rever, in which they tried a more commercial style of rap/hip-hop. Manau published a new album, Nouvelle Vague on 8 November 2019.

== Discography ==
=== Singles ===
- "La Tribu de Dana" (1998) (The Tribe of Dana)
- "Mais qui est la belette ?" (1998) (But Who Is the Weasel?)

=== Albums ===
- Panique celtique (1998) (Celtic Panic)
- Fest Noz de Paname (2000) (Breton Night Fest from Paris)
- On Peut Tous Rêver (2004) (We Can All Dream)
- Best of (2007)
- Panique Celtique II: Le village (2011) (Celtic Panic II: The Village)
- Fantasy (2013)
- Celtique d'aujourd'hui (2015) (Celtic of Today)
- Nouvelle Vague (2019) (New Wave)

== Other Celtic or Irish-styled hip-hop artists ==
- Ashley MacIsaac
- Black 47
- Beltaine's Fire
- House of Pain
- Marxman
- Seanchai & the Unity Squad
