= Panique celtique =

1998 album by Manau

Studio album by Manau
- Released: 7 July 1998
- Recorded: 1998, France
- Genre: Hip hop
- Label: Polydor

Manau chronology
Panique celtique (1998)	Festnoz de Paname (2000)

Singles from Panique celtique
- 1. "La Tribu de Dana" Released: May 1998; 2. "Panique celtique" Released: September 1998; 3. "Mais qui est la belette ?" Released: December 1998; 4. "L'avenir est un long passé" Released: May 1999; 5. "La Confession" Released: July 1999

Panique celtique is the debut album recorded by French hip hop act Manau. It was released in July 1998. It achieved success in France and Belgium (Wallonia) where it hit respectively #1 for several weeks and #2. It provided five singles : the two number-one hits "La Tribu de Dana" and "Mais qui est la belette ?", a top nine hit "Panique celtique", and two top 40 hits "L'avenir est un long passé" and "La Confession".

In 1999, the album gained a Victoire de la Musique in the category 'Rap/groove album of the year'.

== Track listing ==
1. "Intro" (Martial Tricoche / RV Lardic, Cédric Soubiron) – 1:41
2. "La Tribu de Dana" (Martial Tricoche / RV Lardic, Cédric Soubiron, Alan Stivell) – 4:47
3. "L'avenir est un long passé" (Martial Tricoche / RV Lardic, Cédric Soubiron) – 4:40
4. "Panique celtique" (Martial Tricoche / RV Lardic, Cédric Soubiron) – 3:35
5. "Le chant des druides" (Martial Tricoche / RV Lardic, Cédric Soubiron) – 4:17
6. "Faut pas tiser en Bretagne" (Martial Tricoche / RV Lardic, Cédric Soubiron) – 3:54
7. "Le chien du forgeron" (Martial Tricoche / Grégor Gandon) – 4:23
8. "La Confession" (Martial Tricoche / RV Lardic, Cédric Soubiron) – 4:03
9. "Un mauvais Dieu" (Martial Tricoche / RV Lardic, Cédric Soubiron) – 4:48
10. "Mais qui est la belette ?" (Martial Tricoche / RV Lardic, Cédric Soubiron) – 3:58
11. "Je parle" (Martial Tricoche / RV Lardic, Cédric Soubiron) – 4:42

+ Bonus - 1999 issue

1. "L'avenir est un long passé" (new version)
2. "Mais qui est la belette ?" (remix)

Source : Allmusic

== Personnel and credits ==
Singers and musicians

- Narrator : Antoine Duléry
- Background vocals : Paul Eric Toussaint, Maro Doucouré, Mario Santangeli and Eric Leroy
- Choir : Elsa Kalfoglou, Pierre Aulas, John Corbett, Iakovos Pappas, Betrand Ricq.
- Accordion : RV Lardic, Didier Ithusarry
- Bass : Guy Delacroix, R.V. Lardic and Laurent Vernerey
- Bombard : Loïc Taillebrest
- Double bass : Laurent Vernerey
- Bagpipes : Loïc Taillebrest
- Guitar : Manu Vergeade and RV Lardic
- Harp : Anne Mispelter
- Keyboards : RV Lardic
- Scratching : Laurent Meliz
- Sequencing : Cédric Soubiron, Grégor Gandon
- Violin : Grégor Gandon, Floriane Bonami
- Alto : Florent Bremont
- Cello : Anne-Gaelle Bisquay and Isabelle Sajot
- Trumpet : Eric Mula

Recording

- Technical assistance : François Déchery
- Arranged by Manau
- Programming : Laurent Meliz and Grégor Gandon
- Recorded and mixed :
  - by Patrice Kung at Studio of La Grande Armée and Studio Plus XXX (tracks 2–5), assistants : Guillaume Mis and Yann Arnaud
  - by Bruno Fourrier at the Studio of La Grande Armée (tracks 1, 6–12), assistants : Jérémy Mathot and Bruno Ehlinger (except track 12)
- A & R Production executive Varda Kanon, except track 12 : Kika
- Mastering : Raphaël Jonin-Dyam (tracks 6–11), Mastering Top Master (tracks 2–5), Mastering Translab. Jean-Christophe Beaudon (track 12)
- Editions : BMG Music Publishing France, except track 2 : BMG Publishing France / Warner Chappell Music France

== Charts ==
=== Weekly charts ===
Chart (1998–1999)	Peak position
Belgian Albums (Ultratop Flanders)	39
Belgian Albums (Ultratop Wallonia)	2
Dutch Albums (Album Top 100)	42
French Albums (SNEP)	1
German Albums (Offizielle Top 100)	75
Swiss Albums (Schweizer Hitparade)	34

=== Year-end charts ===
Chart (1998)	Position
Belgian Albums (Ultratop Wallonia)	8
French Albums (SNEP)	5

Chart (1999)	Position
Belgian Albums (Ultratop Wallonia)	6
French Albums (SNEP)	5

== Certifications ==
Region	Certification	Certified units/sales
Belgium (BRMA)	Platinum	30,000^{*}
Canada (Music Canada)	Gold	50,000^{^}
France (SNEP)	Diamond	1,000,000^{*}
Switzerland (IFPI Switzerland)	2× Platinum	100,000^{^}
^{*} Sales figures based on certification alone.^{^} Shipments figures based on certification alone.

== Release history ==
Date	Label	Country	Format	Catalog
7 July 1998	Polydor	Belgium, France, Switzerland, Netherlands	CD	557887
2000	Discovery	Belgium, France, Switzerland, Netherlands	CD	5862082
