= Tri Yann =

French musical group

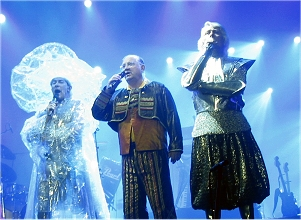
- Tri Yann in concert at Lorient

Background information
- Origin: Nantes, France
- Years active: 1969–2021
- Members: Jean Chocun; Jean-Louis Jossic; Gérard Goron; Jean-Luc Chevalier; Konan Mevel; Fred Bourgeois; Christophe Peloil
- Past members: Bernard Baudriller; Jérôme Gasmi; Christophe Le Helley; Christian Vignoles; Bruno Sabathé; Louis-Marie Séveno; Mylène Coue; Bleunwenn Mevel; Jean-Paul Corbineau
- Website: www.tri-yann.com

Tri Yann (Breton pronunciation: [ˈtriː ˈjãnː]) is a French band who play medieval folk rock music drawing on traditional Breton folk ballads. It was formed in 1969 in Nantes.

The band was founded in 1969 by Jean Chocun, Jean-Paul Corbineau and Jean-Louis Jossic – all of whom remained members – hence the suggested name of Tri Yann an Naoned (Breton for "Three Johns of Nantes"), Jean and Yann being respectively the French and Breton versions of the name John. They presented their final concerts in September 2021, a celebration of their 50th anniversary as a group, which was delayed by the worldwide corona virus pandemic. In December 2022, co-founder Jean-Paul Corbineau died following a long struggle with leukemia.

As the best known "Celtic" band in France, Tri Yann are one of the longest-standing Breton music groups surviving from the folk rock revival of the 1970s (following the revival of the bagadoù and Alan Stivell's work). The group are famous for the outlandish costumes worn on stage.

Among their best-known songs are La Jument de Michao (including the chorus "J'entends le loup, le renard et la belette" i.e. "I hear the wolf, the fox and the weasel") and Dans les prisons de Nantes ("In the prisons of Nantes"). Live performances us--ually include the Breton national anthem Bro Gozh ma Zadoù ("The Land of My Fathers") which has the same tune to the Welsh National Anthem.

Tri Yann sang the role of Uther Pendragon in Alan Simon's rock opera Excalibur, as well as King Louis XII in Simon's rock opera Anne de Bretagne.

== Members ==
Founding members

- Jean-Louis Jossic (vocals, bombarde)
- Jean Chocun (vocals, mandolin, guitars)
- Jean-Paul Corbineau (vocals, acoustic guitar)

Other present members

- Gérard Goron (vocals, drums) 1977–
- Jean-Luc Chevalier (electric guitar, bass guitar) 1988–
- Konan Mevel (bagpipes, flutes) 1999–
- Fred Bourgeois (vocals, keyboards) 1999–
- Christophe Peloil (vocals, violin) 1999–

Former members

- Bernard Baudriller (bass guitar) 1971–1985
- Jérôme Gasmi (drums) 1976–1977
- Christophe Le Helley (flute, medieval instruments, keyboards) 1992–1998
- Christian Vignoles (guitars) 1979–1988
- Bruno Sabathé (keyboards) 1985–1992
- Louis-Marie Séveno (violin, bass guitar) 1986–1999
- Mylène Coue (vocals) 1978
- Bleunwenn Mevel (vocals) 2000–2001

== Discography ==
- 1972: Tri Yann an Naoned
- 1973: Dix ans, Dix filles
- 1974: Suite Gallaise
- 1976: La Découverte ou l'Ignorance
- 1978: Urba
- 1981: An Héol a zo Glaz / Le Soleil est Vert]]
- 1983: Café du Bon Coin
- 1985: Anniverscène (live)
- 1986: Master Série (compilation)
- 1988: Le Vaisseau de Pierre
- 1990: Belle et Rebelle
- 1993: Inventaire 70/93 (compilation)
- 1995: Inventaire Vol.2 (compilation)
- 1995: Portraits
- 1996: Tri Yann en Concert (Live)
- 1997: La Veillée du 3ième Millénaire (interview)
- 1998: Trilogie (3CD Compilation)
- 1998: La Tradition Symphonique (live with the Orchestre National des Pays de la Loire)
- 1999: L'Essentiel en Concert (live compilation)
- 2001: Le Pélégrin
- 2001: 30 ans au Zénith (live CD & DVD)
- 2003: Marines
- 2004: La Tradition Symphonique 2 (live with the Orchestre National des Pays de la Loire)
- 2004: Les Racines du Futur (CD & DVD compilation)
- 2006: Talents (compilation)
- 2006: Gold (2CD compilation)
- 2007: Abysses
- 2011: Rummadoù (Générations)
- 2012: Chansons De Marins
- 2012: Le concert des 40 ans (live CD & DVD)
- 2016: La Belle enchantée
