= Excalibur (rock opera) =

3 part rock opera by Alan Simon

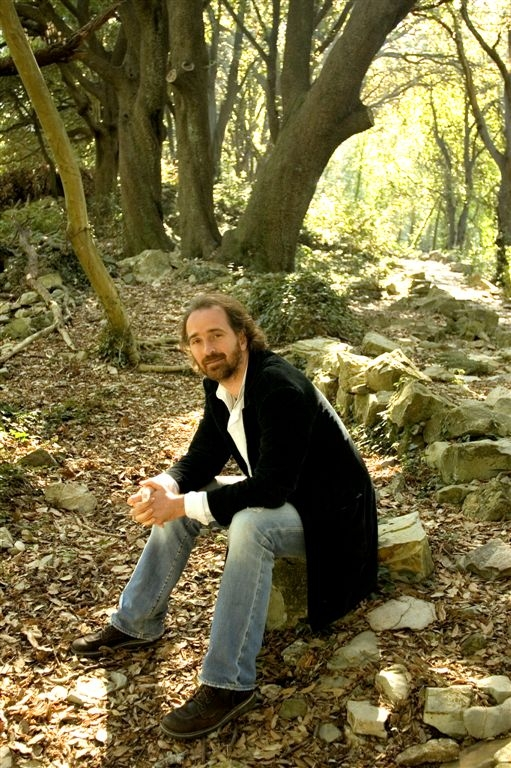
Alan Simon

Excalibur is a three-part "Celtic rock opera" written and directed by Breton folk-rock musician Alan Simon, the first part of which premiered in 1998, and was released as an album in the following year under the French title Excalibur, La légende des Celtes. Its success in France led to two more albums and two novels. In 2009 a spectacular adaptation combining material from the first two albums was performed in Germany under the English title Excalibur: the Celtic Rock Opera, with great success. It was extended with material from the third album in 2011.

== The Excalibur trilogy ==
The first part of an intended trilogy, Excalibur, La légende des Celtes blended musical styles. The story is based on the legend of King Arthur. Narration is led by Merlin. It is structured as a series of songs and instrumental interludes linked by narration, covering the birth of Arthur, the creation of Excalibur, his victory over the pagans, the rebellion of Morgana le Fay and Mordred, the search for the Holy Grail, and Arthur's final defeat and trip to Avalon. Most songs are sung in English, though some are in French and the central song, representing the triumph of Arthur and creation of Camelot, is an arrangement of a traditional Breton language folk song. A voice-over narrates events in French.

Within weeks, the album went gold in France (Top 10). Five concert performances took place between October 1999 and June 2000, including one at Paris-Bercy. A live recording, released as Excalibur, le concert mythique ("Excalibur, the legendary concert") (CD and DVD) was recorded at the first concert in Rennes on 12 October 1999.

In 2007 Simon released the second part of Excalibur, Excalibur II, l'anneau des Celtes ("Excalibur II: The Celtic Ring") with contributions from Jon Anderson (Yes), Alan Parsons, Barclay James Harvest, Maddy Prior, Jacqui McShee, John Wetton (King Crimson / Asia), Justin Hayward (The Moody Blues), Flook, Karan Casey, Fairport Convention, Andreas Vollenweider and Martin Barre. The second part creates a mytho-history of the time before Arthur, describing the birth of Merlin after the loss of the happy land of Anwynn, portrayed as a physical fusion of Britain and Ireland. The emergence of the "Formeriis", demonic barbarians from the earth, violates the perfection of Anwynn. Various Celtic mythical figures are introduced, including Lugh, Bran and Saint Brendan. Merlin and Uther Pendragon struggle to restore order and defeat the Formeriis invasion of Anwynn. It is sung entirely in English.

The third part of the trilogy, "The Origins", was released in early 2012. According to Simon, it describes the origins of the proto-human "Formeriis", in his own take on Celtic myth. Like the second part, it is sung in English interspersed with incantatory fragments of Gaelic, Brythonic and wordless chanting.

Simon has also written two novels on the story, Excalibur, le cercle de Dragon (Excalibur, the circle of Dragon), was released in March 2008. A second volume was published in October 2009 called Excalibur, la prophétie de Merlin (Excalibur, The prophecy of Merlin).

== Cast ==
=== Original 1998 cast ===
The original 1998 cast and album, narrated by Jean Reno, featured among others:

- Roger Hodgson
- Tri Yann
- Gabriel Yacoub
- Fairport Convention
- Angelo Branduardi
- Gildas Arzel
- Nikki Matheson
- Carlos Núñez
- Denez Prigent
- Dan Ar Braz
- Didier Lockwood
- Bohinta
- Davy Spillane
- The Prague Symphony Orchestra
- Bulgarian Orthodox Choir Philippopolis
- Bagad of Saint-Nazaire

=== Excalibur II ===
- Jon Anderson
- John Wetton
- Les Holroyd
- Justin Hayward
- Jacqui McShee
- Fairport Convention
- Merzhin
- Didier Squiban
- Flook

=== Excalibur III, The Origins ===
- Fairport Convention
- Moya Brennan
- Jacqui McShee
- Pat O'May
- John Wetton
- James Wood
- Les Holroyd
- Fleetwood Mac
- Jimme O'Neill
- Billy Preston
- les Tambours du Bronx

=== The Celtic Rock Opera ===
- Alan Parsons
- Martin Barre
- John Helliwell
- Les Holroyd
- Jacqui McShee
- Andreas Vollenweider
- James Wood
- Cécile Corbel

== Revival in Germany ==
An adaptation of the original rock operas was created in an English language performance with German narration on 24 July 2009 in the arena of Kaltenberg Castle. The narrator Merlin was portrayed by the German actor Michael Mendl, while the musical parts are performed by a number of high-profile rock and folk musicians, and accompanied by acrobatics, dancing, step-dancing and sword-fighting performances.

The success of the spectacle led to a tour in other parts of Germany.

=== Further performances ===
The show was a great success with over 17,000 spectators attending the performances on July 24 and 25. A tour in 12 cities of Germany and Switzerland is planned for 2010. Extracts from the opera were performed at Fairport's Cropredy Convention in 2010 by Fairport Convention with guest artists.
