= Cécile Corbel discography =

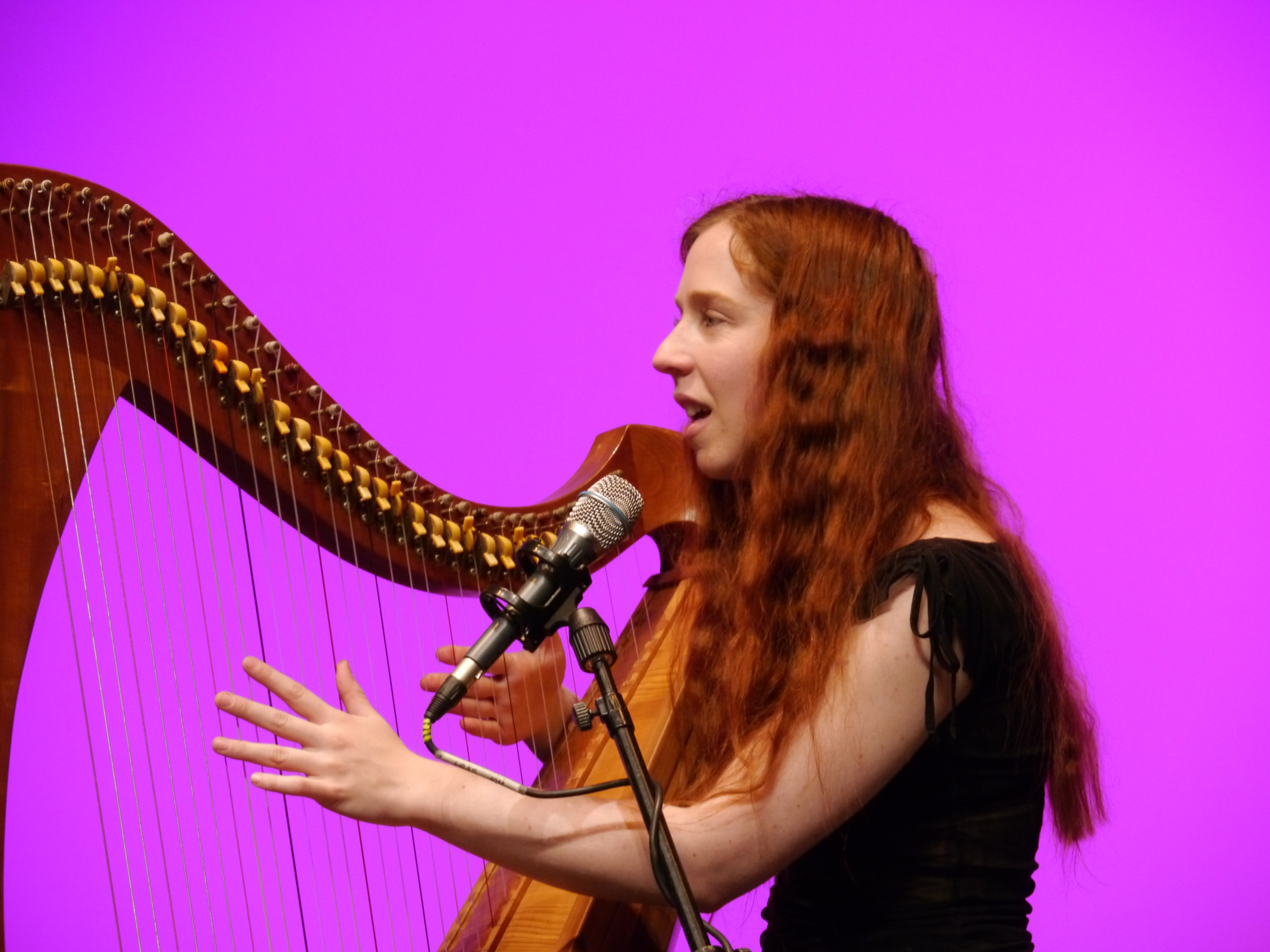
- Cécile Corbel performing at the Mang'Azur Festival of Toulon (a Japanese culture festival)
- Studio albums: 10
- EPs: 1
- Soundtrack albums: 3
- Compilation albums: 4
- Singles: 12
- Music videos: 8

This is the discography of French singer-songwriter and harpist Cécile Corbel. It consists of ten studio albums, four compilation albums, three soundtrack albums, an extended play, and at least twelve singles. She has also participated in two cast recordings.

== Albums ==
=== Studio albums ===
Title	Album details	Peak chart positions	
Title	Album details	FRA	BEL (Wa)
SongBook 1	Release: 13 November 2006; Label: Keltia Musique; Formats: CD, digital download	—	—
SongBook vol. 2	Release: 16 November 2008; Label: Keltia Musique; Formats: CD, digital download	—	—
SongBook vol.3 – Renaissance	Release: 7 June 2011; Label: Keltia Musique; Formats: CD, digital download	—	—
SongBook vol.4 – Roses	Release: 24 June 2013; Label: Keltia Musique; Formats: CD, digital download	—	—
La Fiancée	Release: 6 October 2014; Label: Polydor Records; Formats: CD, digital download	57	173
Vagabonde	Release: 4 October 2016; Label: Polydor Records; Formats: CD, digital download	67	184
Enfant du vent	Release: 29 March 2019; Label: Polydor Records; Formats: CD, digital download	123	—
SongBook vol.5 – Notes	Release: 30 September 2021; Label: Bran Music; Formats: CD, digital download	—	—
La Fille du Verseau	Release: 7 July 2023; Label: EnPhases; Formats: CD, digital download	—	—
Graal	Release: 13 September 2024; Label: Bayard Musique, Bran Music; Formats: CD, digital download	—	—
"—" denotes releases that did not chart or were not released in that region

=== Compilation albums ===
Title	Album details
The Cécile Corbel Collection	Release: 6 July 2009; Label: Bran Music; Formats: Digital download
Le Coffret	Release: 26 November 2010; Label: Keltia Musique; Formats: CD
Best of SongBooks	Release: 16 September 2014; Label: Bran Music; Formats: Digital download
Songbooks Collection	Release: 31 October 2015; Label: Keltia Musique; Formats: CD

=== EPs ===
Title	Album details
Harpe celtique et chants du monde	Released: November 2005; Label: Keltia Musique; Formats: CD, digital download

== Singles ==
Title	Year	Peak chart positions	Sales	Album
Title	Year	JPN	Sales	Album
"Arrietty's Song"	2010	38	JPN: 18,759	Non-album single
"Take Me Hand" (Daishi Dance featuring Cécile Corbel)	2012	—		Wonder Tourism
"The Riddle"	2013	—		SongBook vol. 4 – Roses
"Entendez-Vous"	2014	—		La Fiancée
"Sayonara no Natsu" (さよならの夏) (with Misaki Iwasa)	2018	—		Enfant du vent
"Vent frais"	2018	—		Enfant du vent
"Petit fantôme"	2019	—		Enfant du vent
"Le bal des chats"	2019	—		Enfant du vent
"Take Me Hand" (acoustic version)	2020	—		Non-album single
"Valse sur un Banc"	2020	—		SongBook vol.5 – Notes
"Vous allez bien?"	2022	—		Non-album single
"Arthur"	2024	—		Graal
"—" denotes releases that did not chart or were not released in that region.

== Soundtracks ==
Title	Album details	Peak chart positions		Sales	Certifications
Title	Album details	FRA	JPN	Sales	Certifications
Arrietty Image Album	Release: 7 April 2010; Label: Yamaha Music Communications; Formats: CD, digital download	—	—		
Arrietty Soundtrack	Release: 14 July 2010; Label: Tokuma Japan Communications; Formats: CD, digital download	109	31	JPN: 200,000+	RIAJ: Gold
Terre des ours Soundtrack (with Fabien Cali)	Release: 26 February 2014; Label: Polydor Records; Formats: CD, digital download	186	—		
"—" denotes releases that did not chart or were not released in that region.

== Cast recordings ==
Title	Album details
Anne de Bretagne: Le Rock Opéra d'Alan Simon	Release: 19 September 2009; Label: Babaïka Productions; Formats: CD, digital download
Anne de Bretagne: Le Rock Opéra d'Alan Simon (Live au château des ducs de Bretagne)	Release: 8 November 2010; Label: Babaïka Productions; Formats: DVD, CD, digital download

== Music videos ==
Title	Year	Director
"Sans faire un bruit"	2008	Yohann Walter
"Sweet Song"	2009	Unknown
"La fille damnée"	2009	Unknown
"Sans faire un bruit"	2010	Yohann Walter
"En La Mar"	2011	Unknown
"Sweet Amaryllis"	2012	Unknown
"Garden District"	2013	Yohann Walter
"Entendez-Vous"	2014	Sylvie Berthelot
