= Festival de Cornouaille =

Coordinates: 47.9967°N 4.0964°W

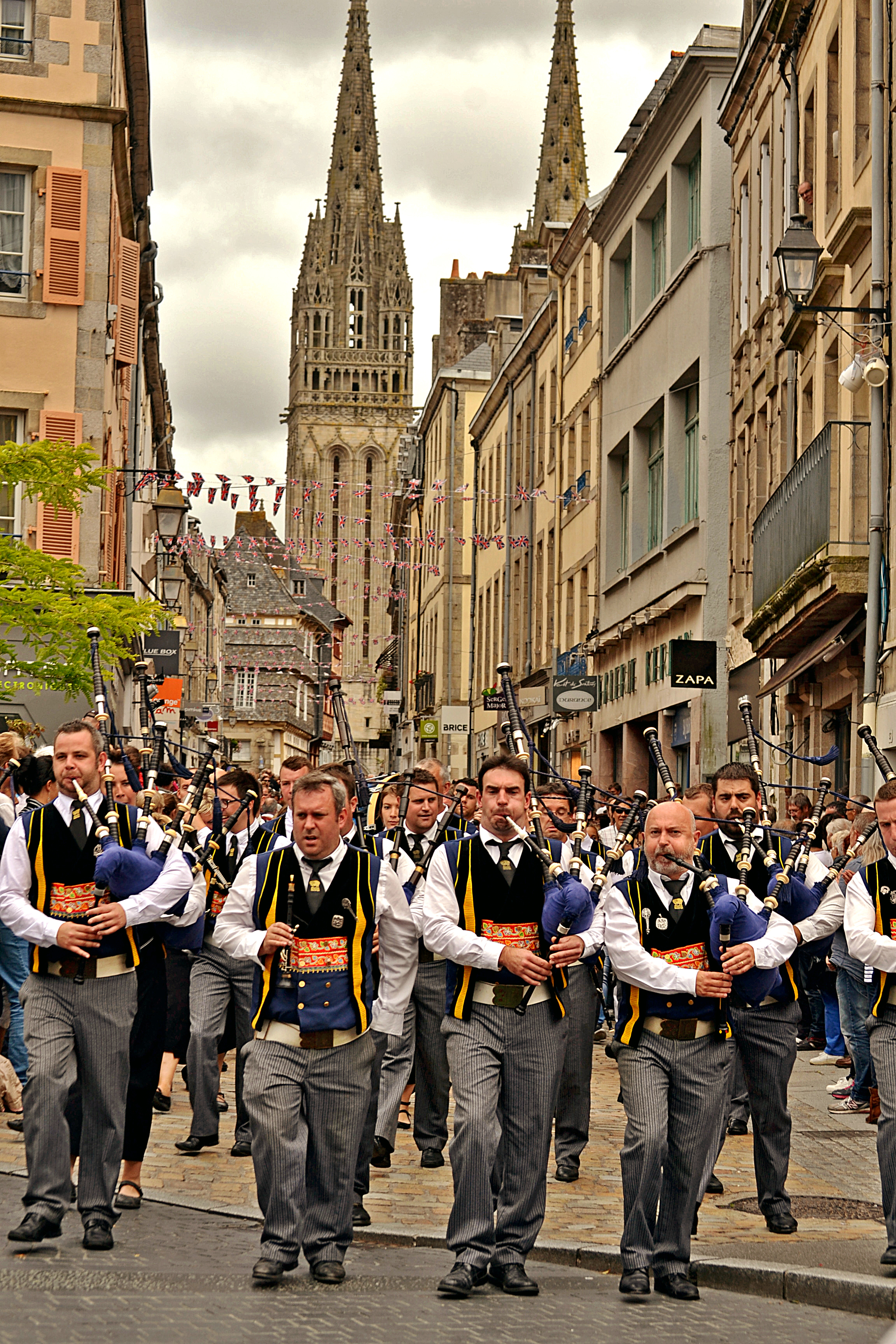
Bagad Kemper parading before Quimper Cathedral in 2015.

The Festival de Cornouaille (French pronunciation: [fɛstival də kɔʁnwaj]) is an annual festival taking place in Quimper in the Cornouaille region of Brittany, France. The festival begins on the third Sunday of July and lasts for one week. It has been held since 1923 and is one of the biggest cultural events in Brittany.

The festival puts forward the Breton culture in its diversity and its richness. About 180 shows, concerts and animations take place in the day and in the evening in the urban heart of the city of Quimper: "a festival in the heart of a city and a culture".

== History ==
=== From 1923 ===
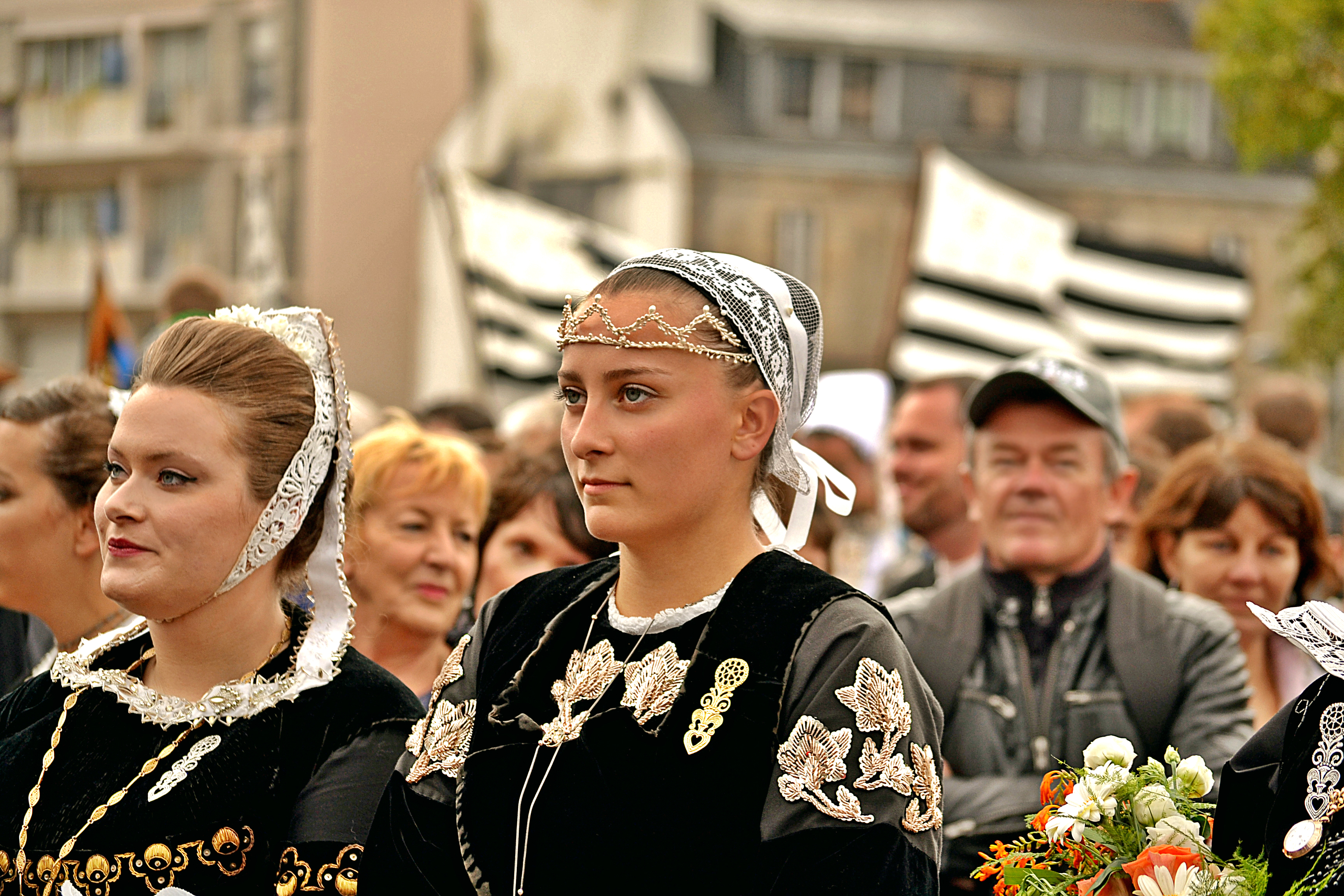
Reine de Cornouaille 2014

The festival was founded in 1923 as a sort of beauty contest. The idea was to choose the most beautiful girl in the region and crown her queen of the festival (hence the name Fête des Reines). The Breton bards Taldir-Jaffrenou and Botrel were present, as were the folk dancers of Plozévet. After the pageant, there was a dinner for 300 guests, accompanied by piano and violin, and the festival ended with a grand ball, where the gavotte was mixed with the Charleston. The festival continued in this form until 1947.

=== From 1945 ===
The festival was not held during the Second World War but was revived after the end of Nazi occupation in 1945. In 1947, the Fête des Reines was renamed Les grandes Fêtes de Cornouaille. The first Fêtes was a four-hour folk festival, focusing on the Breton tradition.

In 1948, a 16-year-old girl was elected festival queen, provoking criticism from the Roman Catholic Church. As a result, in 1949 the practice of electing a festival queen was abandoned, and the festival changed to emphasize local folklore. In the same year the festival was expanded from one day into one week. Since the 1950s, the festival has developed into a Welsh Eisteddfod-inspired celebration of Breton culture, language, literature, and music.

In 1992, the famous guitarist Dan Ar Braz, a native of Quimper, was asked to organize the festival's music. This resulted in the Héritage des Celtes project, which brought together seventy Celtic musicians. This collaboration resulted in a number of albums under the name "Heritage des Celtes".

=== Lineups ===
==== 2016 ====
- Tuesday 19 : Laurène et Louis, Ronan Le Bars with guests (Dan Ar Braz, Sylvain Barou and Stéphane Eicher), Colline Hill, Lina Bellard, Tymen / Kerveillant Quintet
- Wednesday 20 : Maria Desbordes, Bagad Cap Caval et le Phil'Armorik Orchestra, Dremmwel, Duo Rivière / Lagadic, Aroze
- Thursday 21: Gabriella, Doolin', Dañs Er Jeko, Tanaw, Jo Van Bouvel
- Friday 22 : Red Cardell, Alan Stivell, Sylvain Giro, Groove Boys, Amieva
- Saturday 23 : Cyber Fest-noz, Kement Tu, Trio EDF, Voix du sud, Ars'Ys, NIJ, Gwenc'hlan
- Sunday 24 : Kemper en Fête, Soldat Louis, Dj Blue

==== 2015 ====
- Tuesday 21 : Dan Ar Braz, Yann Honoré, Soïg Sibéril
- Wednesday 22 : Angélique Ionatos et Elisa Vellia, Nolwenn Korbell, La Grande Tribu (tribute to Youenn Gwernig)
- Thursday 23: Miossec, Outside Duo, Safar
- Friday 24 : The Celtic Social Club, India Noz (Ollivier Leroy & Eostiged ar Stangala), Kreiz Breizh Academi 5
- Saturday 25 : Kement Tu, Les Goristes, Dasson (Dominique Molard), national championship of Breton pipe bands (third category), Cyber fest noz
- Sunday 26 : Kemper en Fête, fest deiz/fest noz

==== 2014 ====
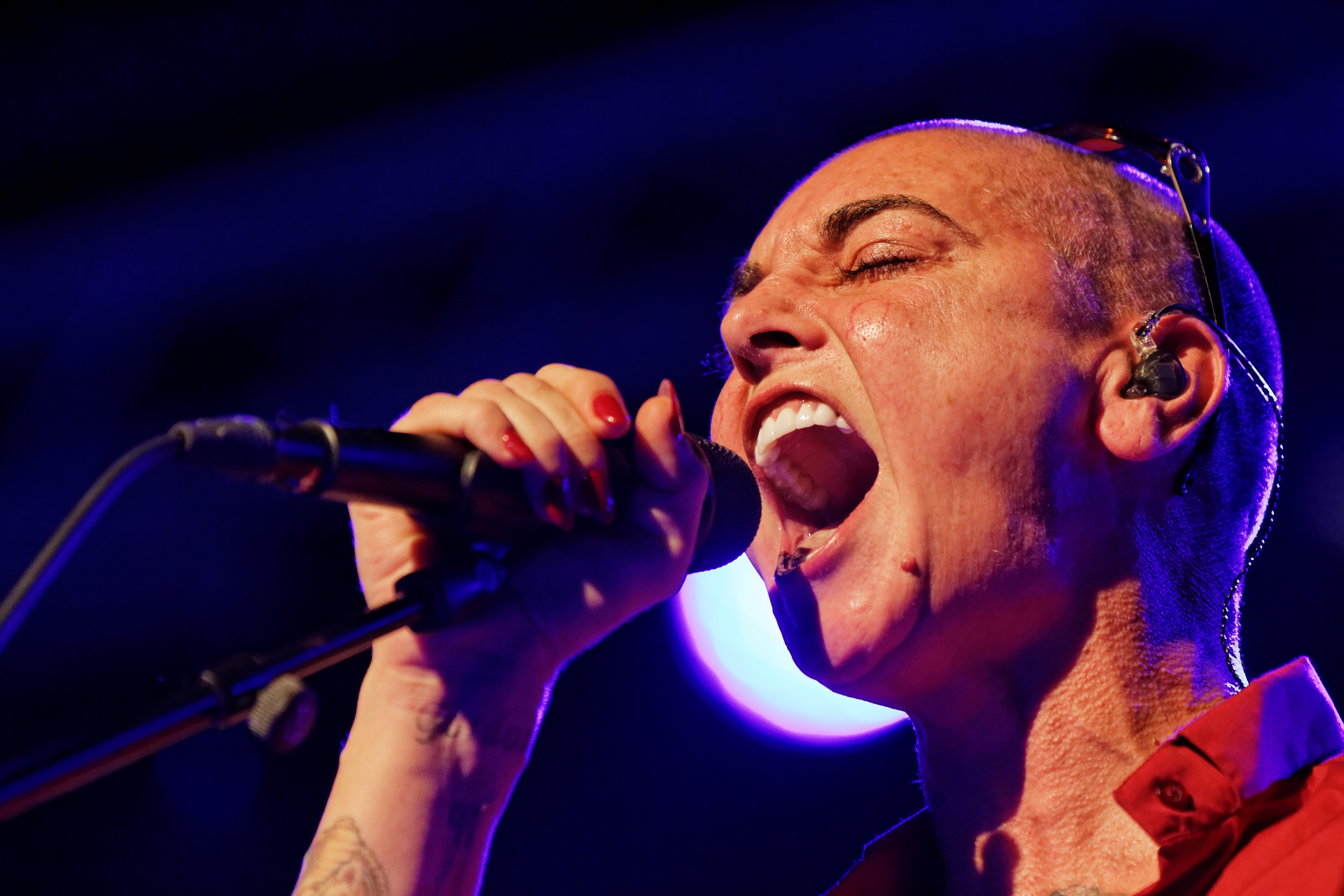
Sinéad O'Connor in 2014

- Tuesday 22 : Susheela Raman, Annie Ebrel, Joa Trio Armel an Hejer, Roland Conq Quartet, Oktopus Kafe, Dastum evening
- Wednesday 23 : Olli and the Bollywood Orchestra, Merzhin, Brieg Guerveno, Maracu'Jah, Sharluber, Ludo Mesnil
- Thursday 24 : Denez Prigent, Clarisse Lavanant, Bagad Penhars/Kolektif Istanbul, David Krakauer, Pavan Takin, Roland Becker
- Friday 25 : Didier Squiban and The Brittany symphony orchestra, Gwennyn, Krismenn solo, H[E]J, Arneo
- Saturday 26 : Sinéad O'Connor, Vishtèn, Jamie Smith's Mabon, Blackwater, War'l leur Dance championship, national championship of Breton pipe bands (third category), Les Gabiers d’Artimon
- Sunday 27 : Red Cardell, Kemper en Fête, fest deiz/fest noz

==== 2013 ====
- Tuesday 23 : Carlos Núñez, Glenmor "L’Insoumis Disuj", Breizharock, New Celeste, Vincendeau-Felder Quartet
- Wednesday 24 : Salif Keita, Barzaz, Konogan an Habask & Pevarlamm KH, Kerden en Awel, "Jeu à la Nantaise" collective, Kejaj
- Thursday 25 : Goran Bregović, Lúnasa, bagad Melinerion "Melin’art Orchestra", Serendou, Startijenn "El-TaQa", Ampouailh
- Friday 26 : Steve Hackett "Genesis Revisited II 2013", Gérard Delahaye, Cécile Corbel, Les Ramoneurs de Menhirs, Dièse 3 & Parveen Khan, Landat-Moisson "E-Leiz"
- Saturday 27 : The Héritage des Celtes and festival (Dan Ar Braz & Bagad Kemper) "Celebrations", Mànran, Jean-Charles Guichen Group, "Encore, bagad Brieg", "Kement Tu" (Breton nationional dance championship), Loened Fall
- Sunday 28 : Murray Head, Kemper en Fête, fest deiz/fest noz, Cyber fest-noz n°15

==== 2012 ====
- Tuesday 24 : Gabriel Yacoub & Marie from Malicorne, Sharon Corr, Ronan Le Bars, "Sin Antesia" (Faustine Audebert), Trio EDF, Spoum (fest noz)
- Wednesday 25 : Ian Anderson (Jethro Tull), Bagad Roñsed-Mor, Armel An Hejer, Les frères Guichen, Raggalendo, Arvest (fest noz)
- Thursday 26 : Loreena McKennitt, Eostiged ar Stangala "Tud Fiction", Les Goristes, Breabach, "Blue & black Zebra" (Hamon-Martin), Esquisse (fest-noz)
- Friday 27 : Red Cardell-Bagad Kemper "Fest-Rock", Soïg Sibéril, Nolwenn Korbell, "Alan Kelly Gang" (The Chieftains, Lúnasa, Guidewires), TiTom, "Mor Kreizdouar Porjekt" (Sylvain Barou - Stelios Petrakis)
- Saturday 28 : Tri Yann, Sonerien Du, Graeme Allwright, Merzhin, Julien Jaffrès, "Kement Tu" (Breton nationional dance championship), national championship of Breton pipe bands (third category)
- Sunday 29 : Emir Kusturica & The No Smocking Orchestra, "Kemper en Fête"

==== 2011 ====
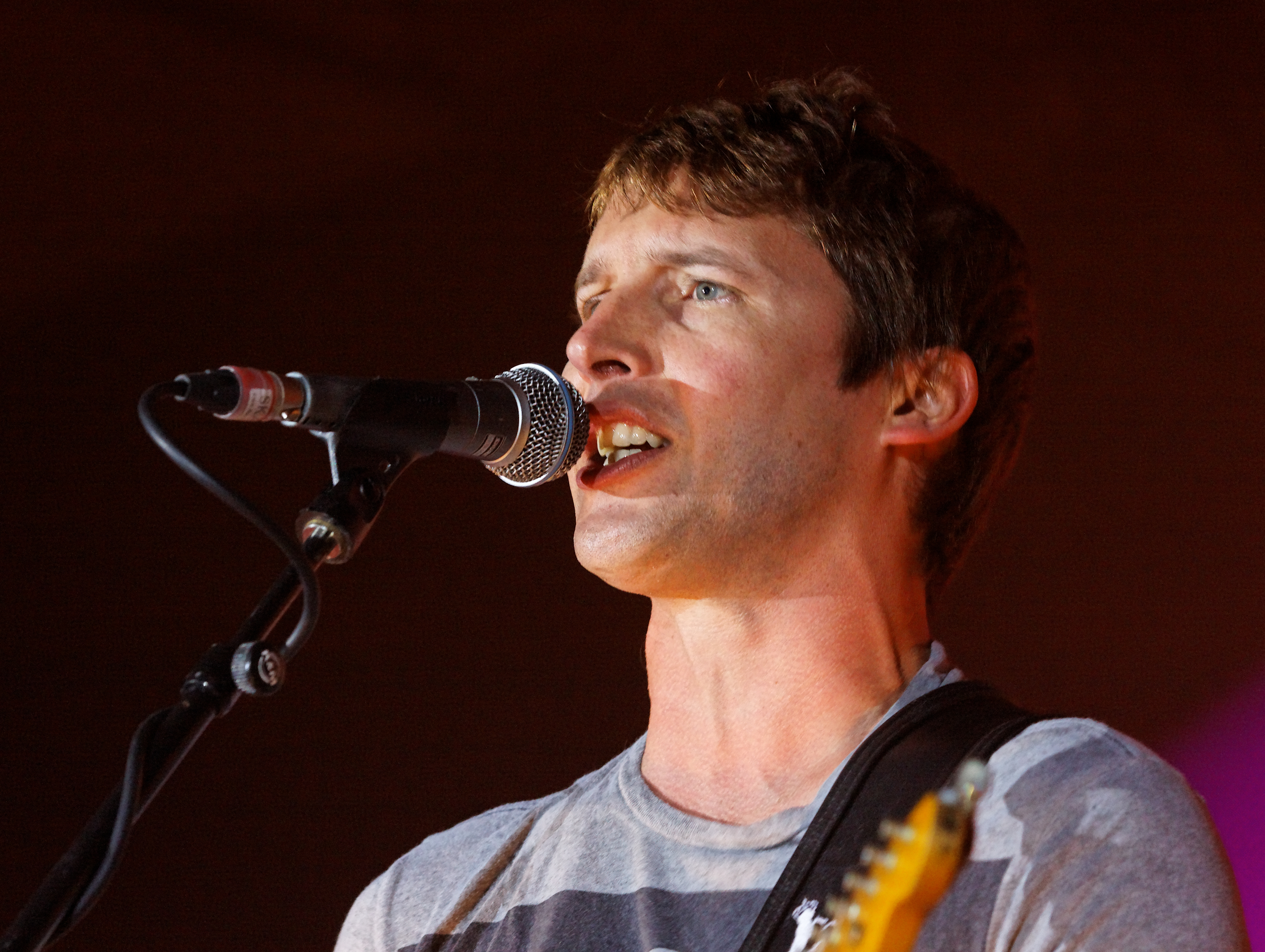
James Blunt in 2011

- Monday 18 : Ars’ys and Jef Le Penven
- Tuesday 19 : James Blunt, Érik Marchand Kreiz Breizh Akademi 3, Krissmenn, Gilles Le Bigot Group, Ar Vro Bagan "Divroa", Hiks
- Wednesday 20 : Gilles Servat, Avalon Celtic Dances, Brian Finnegan & Kan, Guidewires, Siam, Hamon Martin Quintet
- Thursday 21 : Celtas Cortos, Les Ramoneurs de menhirs, Cécile Corbel, Donal Lunny-Sylvain Barou-Padraig Rynne, « Heol, la Bretagne en héritage », Mandala, Kelien
- Friday 22 : Nolwenn Leroy, Bagad Penhars & Co., Dom Duff, Francis Jackson Project, Ampouailh,
- Saturday 23 : « N’Diale » with Foune Diarra Trio & Jacky Molard Acoustic Quartet, « Afro Breizh » of Dounia compagny, « Quimper en danses », Lleuwen, Pat O’May Group, Orion, Kement Tu championship, Bour-Bodros Quintet
- Sunday 24 : « Kemper en fête », Suzanne Vega

==== 2010 ====
- Saturday 17 : Fest noz with Skolvan, Kendirvi and Darhou, « Quimper en danse », Les Pirates
- Sunday 18 : Pascal Jaouen fashion show, David Pasquet Group
- Lundi 19 : Gilberto Gil, Les Goristes, Jamie McMenemy 4, Alain Le Goff, Bayati, Spontus,
- Tuesday 20 : Roger Hodgson sins Supertramp, Gwennyn, Jean-Luc Roudaut, Soïg Sibéril et Jamie McMenemy, TiTom,
- Wednesday 21 : Denez Prigent, Les trompettes du Mozambique, « Le jeu à la Nantaise », Penngollo
- Thursday 22 : « Autour de la guitare celtique », Red Cardell, Gweltaz Ar Fur, Aodan, « Heol, la Bretagne en héritage », Kejaj
- Vendredi 23 : Bagad Cap Caval, Trio EDF, Arz Nevez and Roland Becker, « Heol, Brittany in legacy », Wig A Wag, Talar
- Saturday 24 : Carlos Núñez, Kataje, Amzer-Yann-Fañch Kemener, Aldo Ripoche and Dièse 3, Teada, Sonerien Du, Kendalc’h « Breizh Omega, the world of the possible »
- Sunday 25 : « Dances and music from Brittany », Youssou N’Dour, bagad and circle dance Beuzec Cap Sizun, Pipe bands concert, Carré Manchot

==== 2009 ====
- Sinéad O'Connor, Rokia Traore, Paddy Keenan, Capercaillie, Gabriel Yacoub, Yann-Fañch Kemener, Armens, Nolwenn Korbell Trio, Orquesta Buena Vista Social Club Louise Ebrel, Gwendal, Hamon Martin Quartet, Loened Fall, Follen, Patrick Ewen, Sylvain Barou trio, Lors Jouin & Soïg Sibéril, Octopus Kafe, Gwenaël Kerléo, Izhpenn12, Capstern, Raggalendo, Groove Boysfeat Bagad Landi et Inner Chimp Orchestra, Katé-Mé, Karma, Awen Magic Land

==== 2008 ====
- "Night of Celtic Stars" (30 years of Keltia Musique), Loreena McKennitt, Alan Stivell, Urban Trad, Red Cardell, I Muvrini, Lúnasa, Merzhin, David Hopkins, Les Ramoneurs de menhirs, Iwan B, The Churchfitters, David Pasquet Group, Plantec, Hiks, Djiboudjep, Choir of the World's End, Georgian Legend, Les Goristes, Sylbat, Le Chant des Sardinières, Pascal Jaouen parade, Robert-Noguet Quartet, Ozan Trio, Le Diabl' dans la fourche, Sloï, Yann Raoul, Skilda, Lagad Tan, Comas and Alain Genty, Bill Ebet, Abadenn Veur

== See also ==
- Breton culture
- Breton music (Bagad, Biniou, Bombard)
- Breton dance (Celtic Circle, Fest Noz)
- Breton costume
