= Rubina =

Rubina may refer to:

== People ==
- Rubina Ali (born 1999), Indian child actress who played the younger version of Latika in Slumdog Millionaire (2008)
- Rubina Ashraf (born 1960), Pakistani television actress
- Rubina Bajwa (born 1986), Indian actress
- Rubina Berardo (born 1982), Portuguese politician and Member of the Assembly of the Republic
- Rubina Feroze Bhatti (born 1969), Pakistani human rights activist, peace activist and leadership consultant
- Rubina Dilaik (born 1987), Indian actress
- Rubina Marivonne Haroon, Regional Representative for Eastern and Southern Africa for WWF International
- Rubina Khalid (politician), 21st century Pakistani senator
- Rubina Khalid (qaria) (1959–2017), Pakistani Quran reciter
- Rubina Kuraoka (born 1987), German voice actor
- Rubina Qaimkhani (born 1975), Pakistani politician
- Rubina Qureshi (1940–2022), Pakistani Sindhi-language folk singer
- Rubina Rana (1956–2003), Pakistani Norwegian politician
- Rubina Shergill (1982–2012), Indian television actress
- Rubina (actress) (born 1984), Indian actress
- Dina Rubina (born 1953), Russian-Israeli prose writer
- Sophie Areshian (1881–1971), Armenian revolutionary known by the pseudonym "Rubina"

== Other uses ==
- Antidesma, a tropical plant genus of about 170 species from the family Phyllanthaceae
- Rubina (composition), by Joe Satriani
- "Rubina", a song by Joe Satriani on the album Not of This Earth
- Rubina (YRF Spy Universe), a fictional character in Indian films of the YRF Spy Universe, portrayed by Deepika Padukone and Grace Girdhar

== See also ==
- Rubai (disambiguation), a hypocorism of the name
