= Rubai (album) =

Studio album by Flook
- Released: May 6, 2002 (UK Release); April 8, 2003 (US Release)
- Genre: Instrumental Irish folk
- Length: 44:11
- Label: Flatfish

Flook chronology
Flatfish (1999)	Rubai (2002)	"Haven" (2005)

Rubai is the second album of Irish folk band, Flook, released in 2002 under Flatfish Records.

== Track listing ==
No.	Title	Writer(s)	Length
1.	"Pod: Baldy Hollow"	Sarah Allen	1:38
2.	"Pod: The Empty Pod"	Brian Finnegan	3:19
3.	"Ballybrolly Jigs" (The North Star/The Ghost Of Ballybrolly/Mulineria De Santalla D’Ozcos)	Brian Finnegan	4:28
4.	"Beehive" (The Beehive/ Poon Hill/ Vladimir’s Steamboat)	Sarah Allen, Brian Finnegan, Jay Ungar	5:02
5.	"Glass: Glass Polka"		4:25
6.	"G:D: Hooper's Loop"		0:46
7.	"Pressed for Time"		3:55
8.	"Granny: Granny in the Attic"		2:33
9.	"Granny: Blue Ball/The False Proof"		3:37
10.	"Rosbeg: Suaimhneas Intinne"		2:42
11.	"Rosbeg: Rosbeg"		2:11
12.	"Larry: Kalamantinos"		1:31
13.	"Larry: Larry Get Out of the Bin/Elzic's Farwell"		3:25
14.	"Natterjack: Ramnee Ceilidh/Natterjack's Reel/Conlágh's Big Day"		4:48

== See also ==
- Ed Boyd
- Brian Finnegan
- Flook
