= Brian Finnegan =

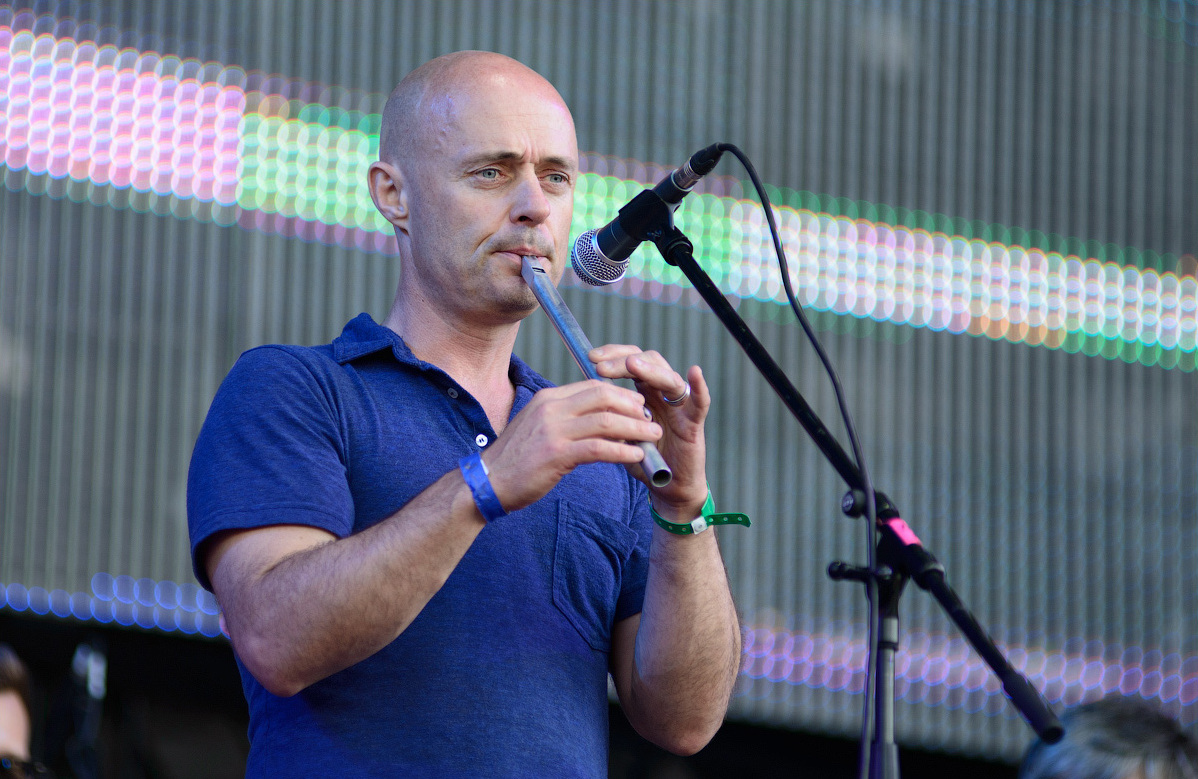
- Brian Finnegan performing with Aquarium at Rock on the Volga Festival in 2013

Background information
- Born: August 20, 1969 (age 57); Armagh, Northern Ireland
- Genres: Irish, Celtic, World, Folk
- Occupations: Musician, producer, composer
- Instruments: flute, tin whistle
- Labels: Singing Tree Music, Flatfish Records
- Member of: Flook, Aquarium, Kan, The Hunger of the Skin Band
- Formerly of: Upstairs in a Tent

Brian Finnegan (born 20 August 1969) is an Irish flute and tin whistle player from Armagh.

Finnegan began playing whistle at age 8 and flute at age 10 as a student of the Armagh Pipers Club under the tuition of the Vallely family. He first came to public attention with the Irish group Upstairs in a Tent.

In 1993 he made a solo album When the Party's Over, which was recorded at Redesdale Studios. In 1995 he formed Flook.

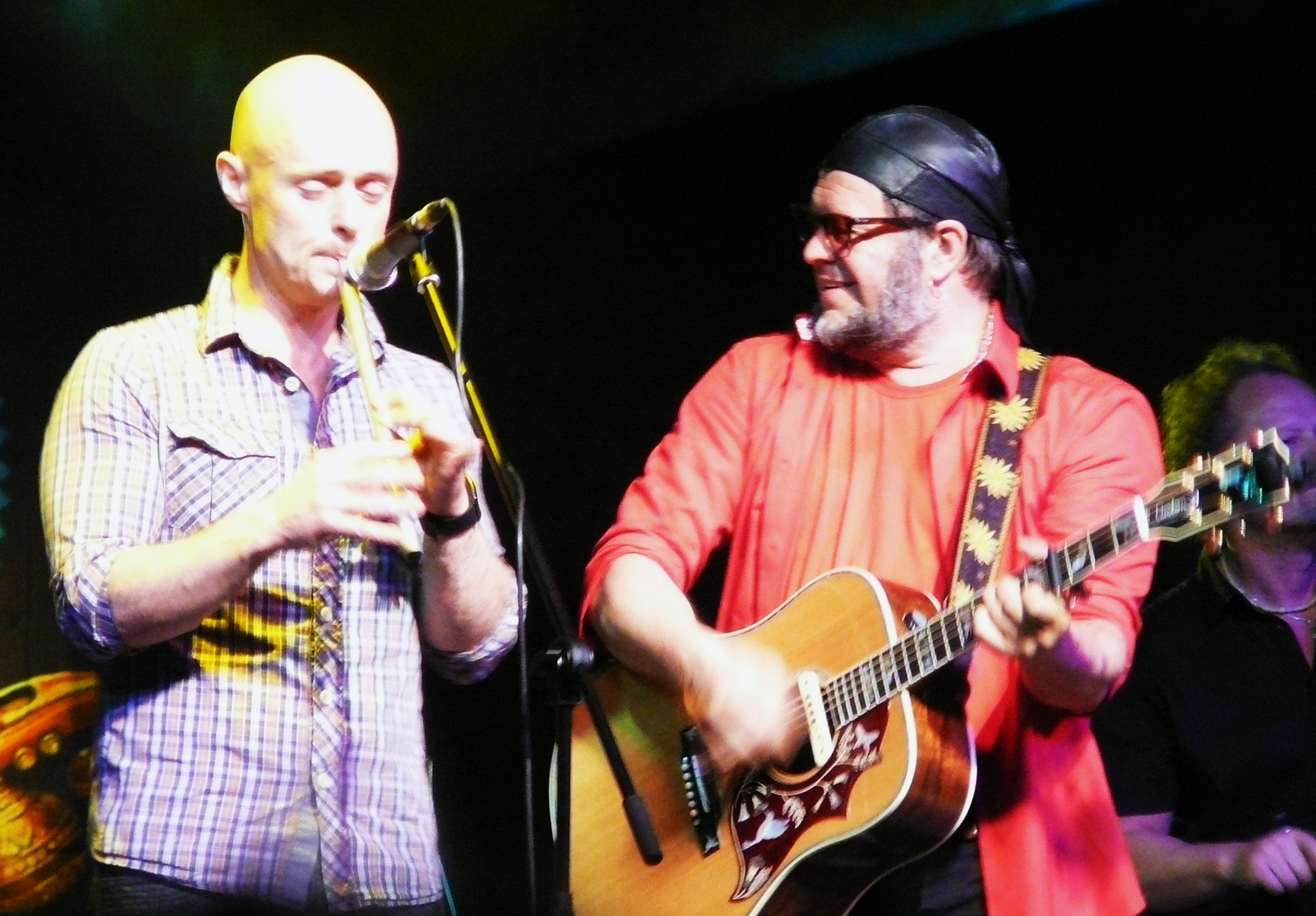
Brian Finnegan with Boris Grebenshchikov at the Aquarium concert in Russia, 2012

Originally a three piece who toured as 'Three Nations Flutes' with Sarah Allen and Mike McGoldrick, they later added Ed Boyd on guitar forming Flook. When Mike left the band in 1997, John Joe Kelly (a frequent guest musician) was added as a band member on bodhrán. Flook continue to tour all over the world with fans across the globe. In 2006, Flook was awarded best band in the BBC Radio 2 Folk Awards. In 2019, the band returned from an extended hiatus with the release of their fourth studio album "Ancora". Brian is a frequent tutor for Folkworks and Burwell Bash where he has been a tutor since 1994.

He tours regularly across the US, Latin America and Ireland with guitarist William Coulter with whom he released the EP 'Toward the Sun' in 2015. He also plays with an influential Russian rock group Aquarium, both live and on their studio albums (since approximately 2009). He worked on cross genre project Parallelogram.

As of 2010, Brian plays with his own trio, with guitarist Ian Stephenson and drummer Jim Goodwin. They formed a four-piece, KAN, with those musicians and fiddler Aidan O'Rourke until disbanding in 2014. A solo album, The Ravishing Genius of Bones, was released in 2010. In March 2021, Brian released solo album Hunger of the Skin.

In 2023, Brian released his first tune book, Timeweaver, which features 70 original compositions from across his 35 years career.

== Discography ==
=== Solo/Duo/Trio ===
Year	Title	Notes
1993	When The Party's Over	
2010	The Ravishing Genius of Bones	
2014	Toward the Sun	With William Coulter
2021	Hunger of the Skin	
2024	Shepherds	
2026	YAMA	

=== As Band Member Of ===
Year	Album	Band	Notes
1996	Flook! Live!	Flook	Small CD 9405
1999	The Four of Us	Flook	Flatfish Records 001CD
1999	Flatfish	Flook	Flatfish Records 002CD
2002	Rubai	Flook	Flatfish Records 004CD
2005	Haven	Flook	Flatfish Records 005CD
2019	Ancora	Flook	Flatfish Records 006CD
2025	Sanju	Flook	Flatfish Records 007CD
2000	Face in the Water	Maalstroom	
2008	Лошадь Белая	Aquarium (Åквариум)	
2009	Пушкинская 10	Aquarium (Åквариум)	
2010	День Радости	Aquarium (Åквариум)	
2011	Архангельск	Aquarium (Åквариум)	
2013	Полная Дискография	Aquarium (Åквариум)	
2017	Двери Травы	Aquarium (Åквариум)	
2020	Знак Огня	Aquarium (Åквариум)	
2020	Top	Aquarium (Åквариум)	
2023	Дом Всех Святых	Aquarium (Åквариум)	
2012	Sleeper	KAN	

=== As Guest Artist/Other ===
Year	Album	Artist	Notes
1996	Evolving Traditions, Vol. 2	Various	
1997	Down And Out In Belfast And Budapest	Patrick McMullan	
1998	Excalibur (La Légende Des Celtes)	Alan Simon	
2003	Sweet Liberty	Cara Dillon	
2003	Goodnight Ginger	John McCusker	
2003	Covering Ground	The Red Hat Band	
2004	Miles Apart	Leon Hunt	with Flook
2005	A Different Life	Emily Smith	
2006	Sirius	Aidan O'Rourke	
2007	The Irish Drum: An Bodhran	Peter Houlahan	
2007	Excalibur II (L'anneau Des Celtes)	Alan Simon	
2008	Hill of Thieves	Cara Dillon	
2008	Yella Hoose + Goodnight Ginger	John McCusker	
2008	Fame and Glory	Fairport Convention	
2008	Worth It All	Su	
2010	Line Up	Ian Stephenson	
2010	A Year in Ireland	New Time Ensemble	
2011	How To Tune A Fish	Beoga	
2011	Riga Live 01.12.2009	Boris Grebenshikov	
2012	Humours of Tula	Lacuna	
2012	Horizons	Claude Samard Polikar	
2013	Å+	Å+	
2013	One Woman: A Song for UN Women	Various	
2014	Соль	БГ (Boris Grebenshikov)	
2014	Planxy BG	Boris Roubekin	
2014	Turn the Corner	Colum Sands	
2015	One House	Tolka	
2016	Futura Ancient Alchemy	Harmonica Creams	
2017	Symphonia БГ	Å+	
2017	÷ (Divide)	Ed Sheeran	2018 Grammy winner - Best Pop Vocal Album
2017	KeltiK	Xabi Aburruzaga	
2018	Время N	БГ	
2019	Throwing Shapes	Emily Jean Flack	
2019	Corcra	Gráinne Holland	
2020	Знак Огня	БГ	
2021	Ceol na Sióg	Gráinne Holland	
2022	Travelers Rest	The Foreign Landers	
2022	Motionless	wornoc	
2022	Tributaries Vol. 2	El Buho	
2022	Bitz & Beatz	Kerry Fitzgerald	
2023	VF Vol. II	Sam Gellaitry	
2023	Canvas	Natalie MacMaster and Donnell Leahy	
2023	Dealan De	Clare Sands	
2024	Gormacha	Clare Sands	
2024	Return from Helsinki	Ian Stephenson	
2025	Dark Harvest (Pt. 2)	Nick Mulvey	
2026	Made to Wonder	The Foreign Landers	
2026	Wa	O'jizo	
