= Rubai =

Rubai may refer to:

- Li Rubai (1553–1620), a general of the Ming dynasty
- Salim Rubai Ali (1935–1978), head of state of South Yemen
- Rubai (album), an album by the Irish folk band Flook
- Rubai (fictional character), a character in Indian films of the YRF Spy Universe, portrayed by Deepika Padukone and Grace Girdhar

== See also ==
- Ruba'i, a form of persian poetry
- Rubaai (film), a 2017 Indian Tamil-language action drama film
- Rubina (disambiguation), a related name
- Rupai (disambiguation)
