= Acoustic guitar (disambiguation) =

An acoustic guitar is a fretted string instrument.

Acoustic Guitar may also refer to:

- Acoustic Guitar (magazine), a monthly magazine published in the US
- Acoustic Guitar (album), by Preston Reed
- Acoustic Guitars (band), a Danish musical quintet
