= Haven (Flook album) =

Studio album by Flook
- Released: October 2005 (UK release); 3 January 2006 (US Release)
- Recorded: February – 5 October 2005
- Genre: Instrumental Irish folk
- Length: 42:02
- Label: Flatfish

Flook chronology
Rubai (2002)	Haven (2005)

Professional ratings
Review scores
Source	Rating
Allmusic	link

Haven is a 2005 album by Anglo-Irish band Flook.

== Track listing ==
1. "The Tortoise and the Hare" – 5:32
2. "Gone Fishing" – 4:03
3. "Mouse Jigs" – 4:23
4. "Souter Creek" – 5:10
5. "Asturian Way" – 4:14
6. "Wrong Foot Forward" – 5:44
7. "Padraig's" – 4:34
8. "Road to Errogie" – 4:51
9. "On One Beautiful Day" – 3:31
