= Anne de Bretagne (rock opera) =

- Le Rock Opéra d'Alan Simon
- Music: Alan Simon
- Lyrics: Alan Simon
- Book: Alan Simon
- Premiere: 29 June 2009: Château des ducs de Bretagne, Nantes
- Productions: 2009 Nantes, France; 2010 France tour (folk rock); 2011 Paris, France (folk rock); 2012 France tour (folk rock); 2012 Redon, France (Renaissance)

Anne de Bretagne is a rock opera by Alan Simon, based on the life of Anne of Brittany. The story follows the historical events that made her the last Duchess of independent Brittany and twice-crowned queen of France.

== Background ==
In 2007, Alan Simon visited an exhibition about Anne of Brittany at the Château des ducs de Bretagne. He got the idea to write an opera about Anne after seeing the reliquary of her heart; he then spent months researching her life. He wanted to write an opera connected to Brittany, and decided on Anne because "in spite of the hundreds of streets, hotels and schools that carried her name, no one knew her story". He wrote the opera based on Renaissance music, classical music and folk rock.

== Performances and recording ==
The recording for the studio album took place between August 2007 and February 2009, with more than 200 musicians participating. The first two performances took place on 29 and 30 June 2009, at Nantes, in the courtyard of the castle of the Dukes of Brittany. On this occasion, the show was played in front of nearly 6000 people. The live show was recorded and later released on CD and DVD. Costumes for the show were designed by Jeanine Lérin-Cagnet and Elise Bossard.

On 5–11 November 2010, a folk rock version of Anne de Bretagne was performed in Ploemeur, Nantes, Quimper and Rennes. This version had some changes compared to the original show—it was more acoustic and did not have the bagad or symphony orchestra. There was also a new narrator, as Jean-Claude Dreyfus could not participate in the tour. For this tour, the narrator was Jean-Louis Jossic, who also played the role of Louis XII.

In April 2012, the folk rock version was performed in Bouvron, Romorantin-Lanthenay, Rennes and Plougastel-Daoulas. There were some changes to the original cast, and the title role was played by Bleunwenn Mevel of Tri Yann. On 22 September 2012, a Renaissance version was performed in Redon.

On 19 September 2014, the show was performed in Vannes as part of Celti'Vannes, a Breton cultural festival. The festival coincided with the 500th anniversary of Anne of Brittany's death.

== Characters ==
- Duchess Anne of Brittany, Queen of France, wife of two kings of France.
- Francis II, Duke of Brittany, Anne's father.
- Louis XII, King of France, 2nd husband of Duchess Anne.
- Philippe de Montauban
- Ferdinand II of Aragon
- Edward IV, King of England.
- John IV of Chalon-Arlay, the Prince of Orange.
- Michelangelo, Italian sculptor, painter, poet and architect.
- Admiral Charles Howard
- Pierre Landais, adviser to Duke Francis II of Brittany.
- Alain I of Albret
- Henry VII, King of England.
- Leonardo da Vinci, Italian inventor and painter.
- Charles VIII, King of France, 1st husband of Duchess Anne.

== Original cast and musicians ==
Cast

- Cécile Corbel as Anne of Brittany
- Christian Décamps (Ange) as Francis II
- Jean-Louis Jossic (Tri Yann) as Louis XII
- Jean-Paul Corbineau (Tri Yann) as Philippe of Montauban
- Nilda Fernandez as Ferdinand II of Aragon
- Simon Nicol (Fairport Convention) as Edward IV
- Laurent Tixier as The Prince of Orange
- Alan Simon as Michelangelo
- James Wood as Admiral Howard
- Didier Squiban as Pierre Landais
- Pat O'May as Alain I of Albret
- Les Holroyd (Barclay James Harvest) as Henry VII
- Giorgio Conte as Leonardo da Vinci
- Tristan Décamps (Ange) as Charles VIII
- Chris Leslie (Fairport Convention) as the unknown English soldier
- Jean-Claude Dreyfus as narrator

Musicians

- Simon Nicol: acoustic guitar, lead vocals and chorus
- Alan Simon: low whistle, added keyboards, added guitars, lead vocals
- Pat O'May: lead electric guitar
- Basile Leroux: lead electric guitar
- James Wood: acoustic guitar, bass, lead vocals and chorus
- Olivier Rousseau: piano
- Didier Squiban: piano
- Michel Bourcier: great organ of St. Pierre's cathedral in Nantes
- Sylvain Fabre: percussion
- Miguel Henry: lute
- Laurent Tixier: hurdy-gurdy, baroque flute, veuze, vocals
- Chris Leslie: lead violin
- Alessandro Sacco: violin
- Bob Callero: stick bass
- Marco Canepa: harpsichord and programming
- Gérard Goron (Tri Yann): drums, percussion and chorus
- Jean-Paul Corbineau (Tri Yann): lead vocals and chorus
- Jean-Louis Jossic (Tri Yann): lead vocals and chorus
- Jean-Chocun (Tri Yann): Irish bouzouki and chorus
- Konan Mevel (Tri Yann): bagpipes
- Christophe Peloil (Tri Yann): violin and chorus
- Frederic Bourgeois (Tri Yann): keyboards and chorus
- Jean-Luc Chevalier (Tri Yann): electric and acoustic guitar
- Tristan Décamps (Ange): lead vocals and chorus
- Christian Decamps (Ange): lead vocals and chorus
- Les Holroyd (Barclay James Harvest): lead vocals and chorus
- Giorgio Conte: lead vocals and voice
- The Budapest Symphony Orchestra orchestrated and conducted by Laurent Couson under the supervision of Alan Simon.
- The Anna Vreizh Bagad conducted and orchestrated by Christian Méhat.
- Genoa Opera Chorus
  - Roberto Tiranti, tenor
  - Francesco Lambertini, bass
  - Paola Dittaleya, contralto
  - Pierra M. Ciuffarella, soprano

== Musical numbers ==
Act I

- "Ouverture - Anna dei Gratia" (Pat O'May / Michel Bourcier / Cécile Corbel / Genoa Opera Chorus)
- "Messire le Duc" (Christian Décamps)
- "Ysabeau" (The Cordelière Quartet)
- "Duchess Anne" (Fairport Convention)
- "La guerre folle" (Fairport Convention)
- "Le Lys et l'Hermine" (Tri Yann)
- Ô ma fille (Christian Décamps)
- "Ma zat" (Cécile Corbel)
- "Ma Dame" (Nilda Fernandez)
- "St. Aubin du Cormier" (Laurent Tixier / Pat O'May)
- "Je vous pleure" (Cécile Corbel)
- "Le Prince d'Orange" (Laurent Tixier)
- "La feste" (The Cordelière Quartet)
- "Desire" (Les Holroyd)
- "Moi le maudit" (Tristan Décamps)
- "Solitude" (Didier Squiban)
- "L'Italie" (Tri Yann)

Act II

- "L'enfant Roy" (The Budapest Symphony Orchestra)
- "Amerigo" (Nilda Fernandez)
- "Les amours galants" (The Nuovo Mondo Quartet)
- "Ii maestro" (Giorgio Conte)
- "The king" (Les Holroyd)
- "Tro Breizh (The Cordelière Quartet)"
- "Le pommier d'or" (Alan Simon)
- "Le pommier d'or" (reprise) (The Anna Vreizh Bagad / Pat O'May)
- "Marie la cordelière" (Fairport Convention / James Wood)
- "Anna Vreizh" (intro) (Didier Squiban)
- "Anna Vreizh" (Cécile Corbel)
- "Final: In Pace Anna" (Pat O'May / Michel Bourcier / Genoa Opera Chorus)
- "Epilogue: The soldier" (Chris Leslie)

== Cast recordings ==
- 2009: Anne de Bretagne, studio album (double CD)
- 2010: Anne de Bretagne: live au Château des Ducs de Bretagne (triple CD)
- 2010: Anne de Bretagne au Château des Ducs de Bretagne (DVD)
