= Rupai =

Rupai may refer to:

- Rupai (film) or Rubai, a 2017 Indian Tamil-language action film
- Sonai and Rupai, the two daughters of king Dharma Dev of Kanker District, Chhattisgarh, India
- Rupai Siding a fast developing township situated in the district of Tinsukia in Assam
- Sonai Rupai Wildlife Sanctuary, protected area located in the state of Assam in India

== See also ==
- Rubai (disambiguation)
