= Merzhin =

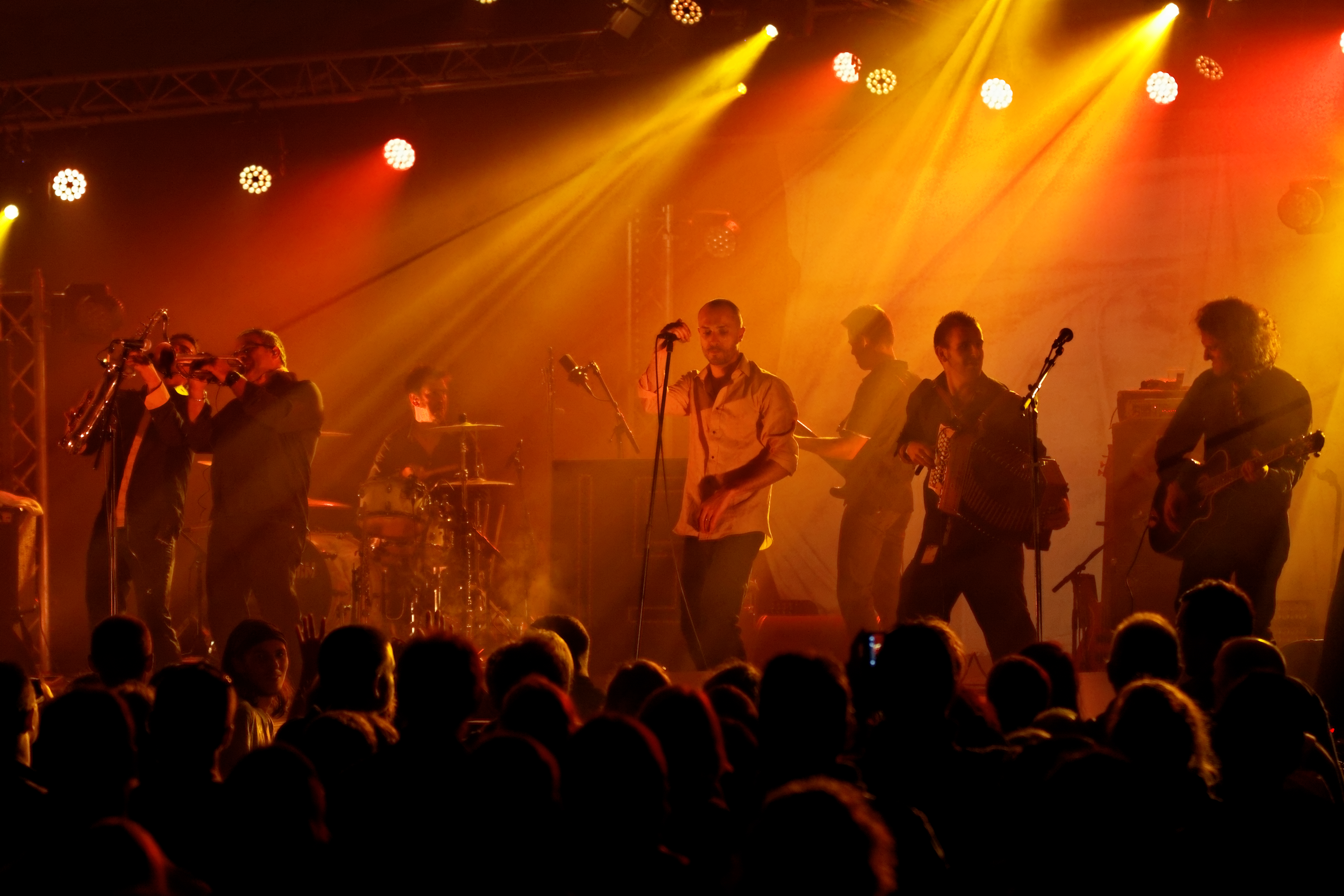
Merzhin in the Festival de Cornouaille 2012

Merzhin ("Merlin" in Breton language) is a rock band from Landerneau, in Brittany, formed in 1996 by six friends of high school. Their music is characterized by the displayed energy and by the uncommon use of instruments in the standards of the rock. Indeed, inspired by their native Brittany, six musicians don't hesitate to intervene in lead instrument bombards or various types of flutes or brass instruments besides the traditional guitars, bass and drums.

They are distinguished by their festive and energetic scenic performances and by their musical universe, proposing original rock music of a Breton inspiration. In 2014, the band released their sixth studio album.

== Members ==
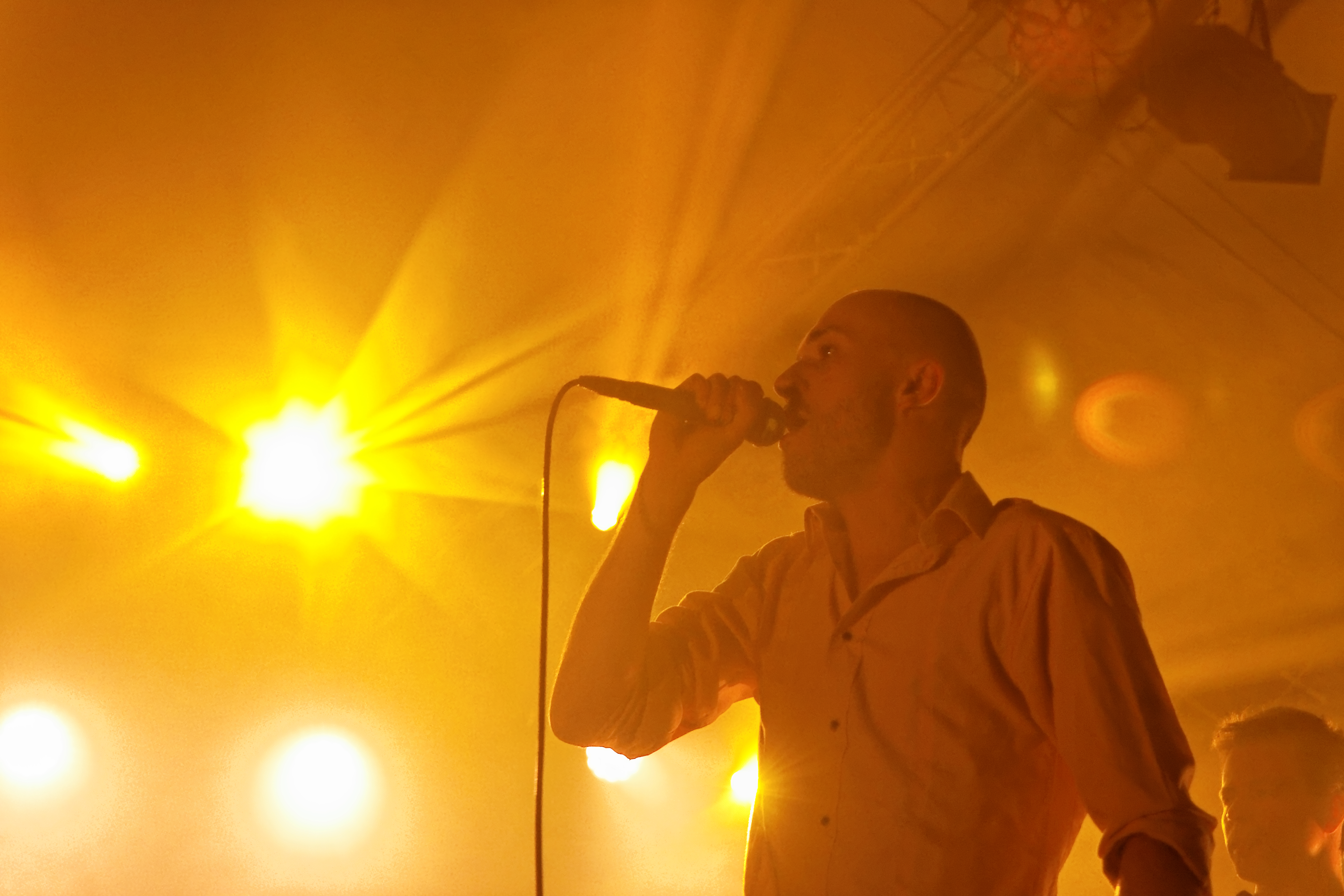
Pierre Bourdonnec

- Pierre Bourdonnec – singing, choirs, guitar, harmonica
- Ludovic Berrou – bombard, flute, oboe, clarinet, saxophone, vocals
- Damien Le Bras – bass
- Stephane Omnes – electric guitar (ebow, slide...)
- Vincent The Hour – electric and acoustic guitars, backing vocals
- Jean- Christophe Colliou – drums, percussion, backing vocals

For the Merzhin Moon Orchestra:

- Baptiste Moalic – accordion
- Antoine Pierre Colas – trumpet
- Emmanuel Chobriat – trombone

=== Former members ===
- Mathieu Person: drums and percussion until 2005
- Christophe "Tof" Rossini: drums and percussion from 2005 to March 2008 (drummer of rock band EV)

== Discography ==
=== Studio albums ===
- 2000: Pleine Lune (Stormy Music / BMG)
- 2002: Adrénaline (Stormy Music / BMG)
- 2006: Pieds nus sur la braise (Stormy Music – RCA / Sony BMG)
- 2009: Moon Orchestra (Adrenaline Prod. / Coop Breizh)
- 2010: Plus loin vers l'Ouest (Adrenaline Prod / L'Autre Distribution)
- 2014: Des heures à la seconde (Adrenaline Prod. / L'Autre)
- 2016: Babel (Adrenaline Prod. / L'Autre)
- 2018: Nomades (Verycords)
- 2022: Marche et c(r)êve (Verycords)

=== Live ===
- 2007: Pieds nus sur le Scène – Live in India (Stormy Music / BMG)
- 2008: Merzhin Live (RCA / Sony BMG)

=== Compilations ===
- 2012: 15 (Adrenaline Prod / L'Autre Distribution)

=== EP ===
- 1998: Merzhin (autoproduction)
- 1999: Première Lune (Stormy Music / BMG)
- 2002: Live au Bataclan (Stormy Music / BMG)
