= Pat O'May =

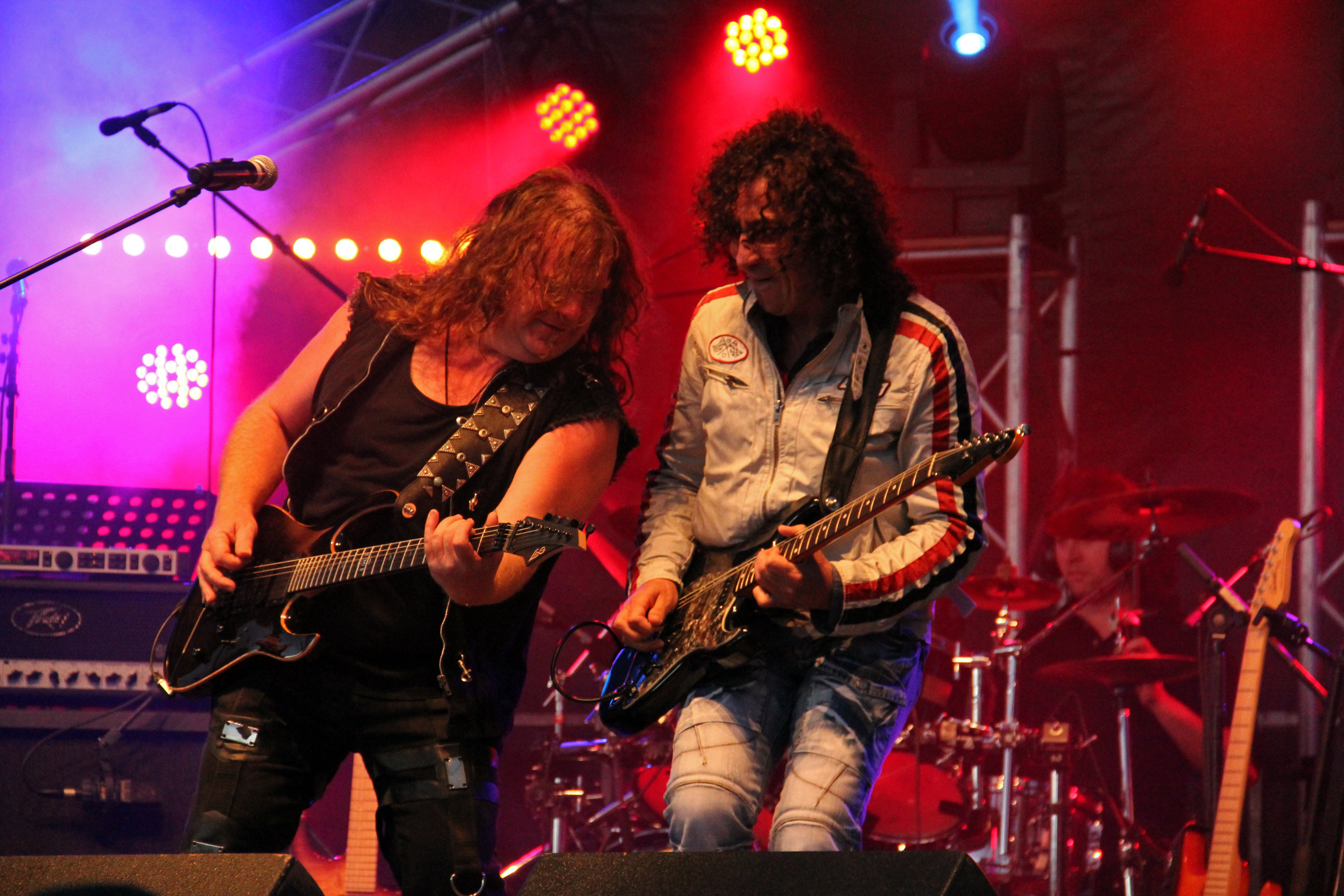
- Pat O'May and the French guitarist Norbert Krief

Background information
- Born: 1961 (age 64–65); Rouen, France
- Genres: rock music, celtic metal, world music
- Occupations: guitarist, composer, singer
- Instruments: Guitar, vocals
- Years active: since 1993 (solo)
- Label: Keltia Musique
- Formerly of: Marienthal
- Website: www.patomay.com

Pat O'May (born 1961) is a French musician who blends rock music with elements of world music. He originally worked with the heavy metal band Marienthal, and also produced several solo albums. He has written over 100 tracks for the TV show European coast seen from the sky. He participated in Alan Simon's rock operas Anne de Bretagne, Excalibur: The Celtic Rock Opera and started working with Martin Barre touring and recording with him.

== Career ==
O'May was born in Rouen, France. As a teenager, he was a fan of rock music and R&B from the Osmond Brothers, but the album Machine Head by Deep Purple inspired him to become a hard rock guitarist. He joined the heavy metal band Marienthal about 1982. He gave guitar lessons and took them himself from Patrick Duplan, which made him explore classical music, blues, and bossa nova. Marienthal toured France, England, and Algeria, and opened for acts such as Girlschool, Alvin Lee, and Chariot. After conflicts with their manager, the band split in 1987. O'May continued touring with the group Road 66 across France but playing in bars led to excesses. O'May decided to put an end to this during a tour in Belfort. He stayed in Belfort where he met the band Ange and as drummer Peter Hartmann and bassist Alain De Bernardi, with whom he refounded the group Road 66.

O'May moved to Brittany in 1989. After a third group experience with Road 66 and the sound of Breton concerts and bals, he released his first solo album, Bob Up, in 1994, with Breton musicians Alain Genty, Michel Aumont, Fred Guichen and Stéphane De Vito.

Godin, a French guitar distributor, chose him as its spokesperson. In 1995, he was invited by the Festival "Cannes Passion Music" in Cannes for master classes. In 1996, he released the album Kids & the War, with Celtic instruments: Scottish Snare drum and uilleann pipes).

He recorded his third album, Breizh – Amerika, in which he continued to fuse rock and traditional sounds, adding Celtic music, and involving French guitarist Norbert Krief. He had the album mixed by Guns N' Roses guitarist Ron Thal in New York City, and released it in 1999.

In 2002, O'May produced the album Un Souffle Pour la Vie (Breath for Life) with many artists. He donated the profits to cystic fibrosis research. That year, he also released his fourth album, Anakoustik, and followed it with a tour with pianist Philippe Turbin. In 2003, he created a show with the Breton singer Gilles Servat.

O'May has composed over 100 tracks for the TV serial European coast seen from the sky, which has been distributed to 15 countries. Breton musician Alan Stivell had him play on his album Explore, which released in 2006. O'May also participated in "Brittany celebrates St. Patrick's day" at Palais Omnisports de Paris-Bercy, and played as a guest musician on Johnny Hallyday's "Flashback Tour". In 2007, he signed with Milan Music/Universal label for his fifth studio album, Omega. It was released on 8 July, and he played at the "Festival des Terre Neuvas" in France in front of 47,000 people. In 2008, O'May toured in France and Europe.

Alan Simon invited O'May to participate in the rock opera Anne de Bretagne. O'May also participated in Simon's second project, Excalibur, a Celtic rock opera. Excalibur toured in Germany and Switzerland in 2010.

O'May released his sixth album, In Live We Trust, with ten tracks and a horn section. His concert producer describes his style as "exploring new territory with an original blend of his own well-known guitar approach and world music elements using among others Celtic, Arabian and Chinese sounds". He participated in the 2010 Bercy for St Patrick's Day, and recorded for Excalibur III, which was the third album from the Excalibur rock opera. He continued touring for both of Simon's projects through 2011 and 2012, visiting Switzerland, France, and Germany. He developed a friendship with Martin Barre, and later toured with him in October 2011. In 2012, Barre invited him to join his new group for several tours in Britain, Germany, Italy, USA.

O'May appeared in 2012 as guest on Alan Stivell concerts, in earlier parts of several concerts of Uli Jon Roth (ex-Scorpions guitarist) and played in Nancy Zénith including Scorpions, Pat McManus, Gamma Ray, Karelia and Koritni.

O'May released his seventh album, Celtic Wings, drawing for writing it in his musical (metal), genetic (Ireland) and emotional (Brittany) roots. It gives rise to a Celtic rock and metal album, between new compositions and covers (Alan Stivell medley, Over the Hills and Far Away, Whiskey in the Jar), with the participation of Martin Barre, Alan Stivell, Jonathan Noyce (Gary Moore, Archive), Moya Brennan (Clannad), James Wood, Christophe Peloil (Tri Yann). The album, which he began writing six months before the release in November, is recorded in Britain, Ireland, England and mastered at the famous Abbey Road Studios in London.

== Discography ==
- Bob Up (WMD, 1994)
- Kids & the War (Wagram, 1996)
- Breizh-Amerika (Coop Breizh, 1999)
- Anacoustik (Prod'ig, 2002)
- Pat O'May Omega (Milan Music, 2007)
- In Live We Trust (Keltia Musique, 2010)
- Celtic Wings (Keltia Musique, 2012)
- Behind The Pics (Keltia Musique, 2014)
- Keltia Symphopnia (Keltia Musique, 2016)
- One Night In Breizh land (Coop Breizh, 2018)
- Welcome To A New World (Artdisto, 2021)
