= Alan Simon (musician) =

French folk-rock musician and composer (born 1964)

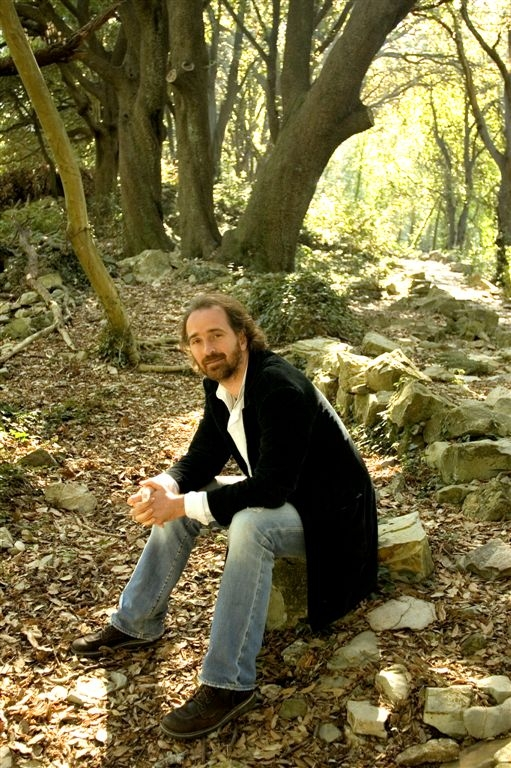
- Simon in 2006.

Background information
- Born: Alan Simon; 3 July 1964 (age 62)
- Origin: Nantes, Brittany, France
- Genres: Celtic rock; folk rock
- Occupations: Musician; songwriter
- Instruments: vocals; guitar; flute; harmonica; piano
- Years active: 1984–present
- Label: Sony
- Website: Alan Simon official Website

Alan Simon (born 3 July 1964) is a French folk-rock musician and composer, best known for his Celtic rock operas performed with noted rock musicians guesting. Simon is associated with Breton Celticism, and his most ambitious works are typically on themes linked to Celtic myth and history. Simon has also branched out into film-making.

== Life ==
Simon was born in Nantes, spending his early years in the moorlands of Goulaine. He left school at 15 to travel the world, supporting himself in a variety of trades. From 1979 to 1992 he lived in Asia. He also travelled twice around the world, financed by photographic work, journalism and musical performances. He also marketed his songs to rock musicians, having some success and building up contacts before he achieved fame.

He currently resides near Nantes.

== Career ==
=== Early work ===
Aged 20, he wrote his first work, The Rebel Child, which won the Grand Prize of the Society of Artists in France. In 1995, he composed his first musical story, Le Petit Arthur (Little Arthur) (Polygram), which became, three years later, one of the tools for learning the French language in Denmark. The story Les Enfants du Futur (The Children of the Future) (Walt Disney) was released in 1996 and brings together over 25 artists including Jean Reno, Albert Dupontel and Nilda Fernandez.

=== Excalibur ===
Simon achieved fame with his Celtic rock opera Excalibur, La Légende des Celtes (Excalibur, The Legend of the Celts) (Sony) in 1999, of which he was both songwriter and producer. The first part of an intended trilogy, Excalibur blended musical styles and was performed by Roger Hodgson (ex-Supertramp), Fairport Convention, Dan Ar Braz, Tri Yann, Angelo Branduardi, Didier Lockwood and Gabriel Yacoub. Within weeks, the album went top 10 and gold in France. Five concert performances took place between October 1999 and June 2000, including one at Paris-Bercy. A live recording, released as Excalibur, le concert mythique (Excalibur, the legendary concert) (CD and DVD) was recorded at the first performance in Rennes on 12 October 1999.

=== Gaia and other works ===
In the following year, Simon collaborated with Hodgson on the latter's album Open The Door. The album charted in France (Top 30), Spain (Top 5), Switzerland and Belgium. Simon co-wrote the last song on the album.

In 2003, he created GAIA (Universal / BMG / Sony), a humanitarian concept album dealing with the preservation of the environment. Guests included Midnight Oil, Justin Hayward of The Moody Blues, Zucchero, Jane Birkin, Cesária Évora, Billy Preston. GAIA was played before 60,000 spectators in Zurich in early 2004. The album made the top five in Australia. He also published his first book, Gaia, carnets secrets de la planète bleue, published by Editions du Seuil in March 2003.

In 2004, he composed the song "I have a dream" for the anti-apartheid musical Sud Afrique. The South African group Umoja also performed Simon's song "The Way".

In 2005, Simon directed his first feature film, O Genghis which traces the odyssey of the last nomadic Mongol descendants of Genghis Khan. This film was shot in Russia and Asia (with contributions by Jean Reno and Omar Sharif). O Genghis was released in 20 countries and has been broadcast many times on Canal +.

Fascinated by the return of the wolf to French territory, Simon wrote the 2006 screenplay Mon frère le loup (My brother the wolf). The project remains unrealised.

=== Excalibur extended ===
In 2007, Simon released the second part of "Excalibur", Excalibur II, l'anneau des Celtes (Excalibur II, the ring of the Celts) with contributions from Jon Anderson (Yes), Alan Parsons, Barclay James Harvest, Maddy Prior, Jacqui McShee, John Wetton, Justin Hayward, Flook, Karan Casey, Fairport Convention, Andreas Vollenweider and Martin Barre.

Simon's novel, Excalibur, le cercle de Dragon (Excalibur, the circle of Dragon), was released in March 2008. A second volume was published in October 2009 called Excalibur, la prophétie de Merlin (Excalibur, The prophecy of Merlin).

On 25 May and 25 July 2009 "Excalibur" was revived in Germany under the English language title Excalibur: the Celtic Rock Opera. It was performed in English with a German narration. It was performed before 19,000 people at Castle Kaltenberg. Following this surprising success, "Excalibur" toured throughout Germany and 100,000 spectators attended the Celtic rock opera, reuniting nearly 160 musicians and almost as many technicians. A new tour began in January 2011 across Europe.

The third part of the trilogy, Excalibur III The Origins (Excalibur III: The Origins), was released in 2012.

=== Anne de Bretagne ===
In 2008 Alan Simon created the rock opera Anne de Bretagne. This work of 31 tracks tells the life story of Anne of Brittany, following the historical events that made her the last Duchess of independent Brittany and twice crowned queen of France. It was performed by Nilda Fernandez, Tri Yann, Barclay James Harvest, Fairport Convention, Pat O'May, Cécile Corbel (as Anne herself), Laurent Tixier, James Wood and an ensemble of 200 musicians.

The Chateau des Ducs de Bretagne in Nantes hosted the premiere of Anne de Bretagne on 29–30 June 2009 to 6000 people. The live performance was released as a CD and DVD.

=== Recent activity ===
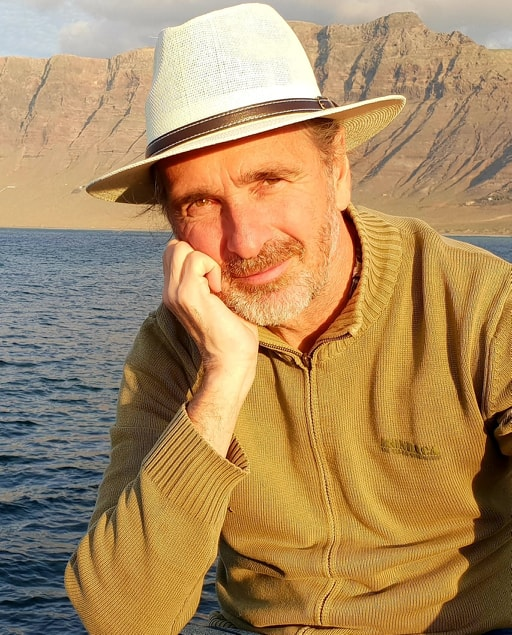
Simon in 2019

The Excalibur team performed a fourth arena tour in Germany and Switzerland 1–16 December 2016.

A 4th Excalibur album, Excalibur the Dark Age of the Dragon, was released on 10 November 2017.

As part of the science fiction festival "Les Utopiales" in Nantes on 3 November 2017, Simon created a symphonic electro-rock ballet entitled "Big Bang", about the beginning of the universe, with John Helliwell (from Supertramp fame) on saxophone. A studio album was released on 23 March 2018.

A new version of his folk rock opera "Tristan & Yseult" was performed at the Minsk National Theater in Belarus from 1 December 2017 to 2018.

A 5th Excalibur album, Excalibur V, Move, Cry, Act, Clash!, was released in 2021.

== Discography ==
=== As sole composer ===
- 1994: Le Petit Arthur (Conte musical)
- 1996: Les Enfants du Futur (Conte musical)
- 2003: GAIA
- 2009: Anne de Bretagne (Folk Rock opera)
  - 15 March 2010 : "DVD Anne de Bretagne live au chateau des ducs"
  - 15 October 2010: "Triple CD Live "Anne de Bretagne au chateau des ducs"
- 2014: Tristan & Yseult
- 2018: Big Bang
- 2018: Chouans

==== Excalibur rock opera series ====
- 1999: Excalibur I, The Legend of the Celts / La Légende des Celtes (folk rock opera) (Sony Music)
- 2000: Excalibur, The Legendary Concert / Le Concert Mythique (live version, oct. 1999) (Sony Music)
- 2007: Excalibur II, The Celtic Ring / L'Anneau des Celtes (EMI)
- 2012: Excalibur III, The Origins (Babaïka Productions/Celluloïd)
- 2012: Excalibur, Live à Brocéliande 2012 (CD/DVD) (Pathé)
- 2017: Excalibur IV, The Dark Age Of The Dragon (Babaika Production)
- 2021: Excalibur V, Move, Cry, Act, Clash! (Spirit Of Unicorn Music)

=== Collaborations ===
- 2000 : Open The Door by Roger Hodgson
- 2004 : UMOJA musical about apartheid (song I have a Dream)
- 2005 : Crème Anglaise by John Helliwell

== Filmography ==
- 2004 : O Genghis, narrated by Jean Reno (French version) and Omar Sharif (English version).
- 2006: Mon frère, le Loup, unrealised scenario.
- 2009: La Robe du soir by Myriam Aziza; Simon composed the song "L'enfant Roy"
- 2010: Christopher Ross by Max Sender; Simon composed "Peace on earth"

== Writings ==
- 2003: GAIA, Carnets secrets de la planète bleue
- 2008: Excalibur le cercle du dragon (vol. 1)
- 2010: Excalibur la prophétie de Merlin (vol. 2)
