= Keltia Musique =

French record label

- Founded: 1978
- Founder: Hervé Le Meur
- Distributor(s): Self-distributed
- Genre: Celtic, Breton
- Country of origin: France
- Location: Quimper, Finistère

Keltia Musique is a French independent record label and distribution company specializing in Celtic music. It was founded in 1978 in Quimper, Brittany, by Hervé Le Meur.

== History ==
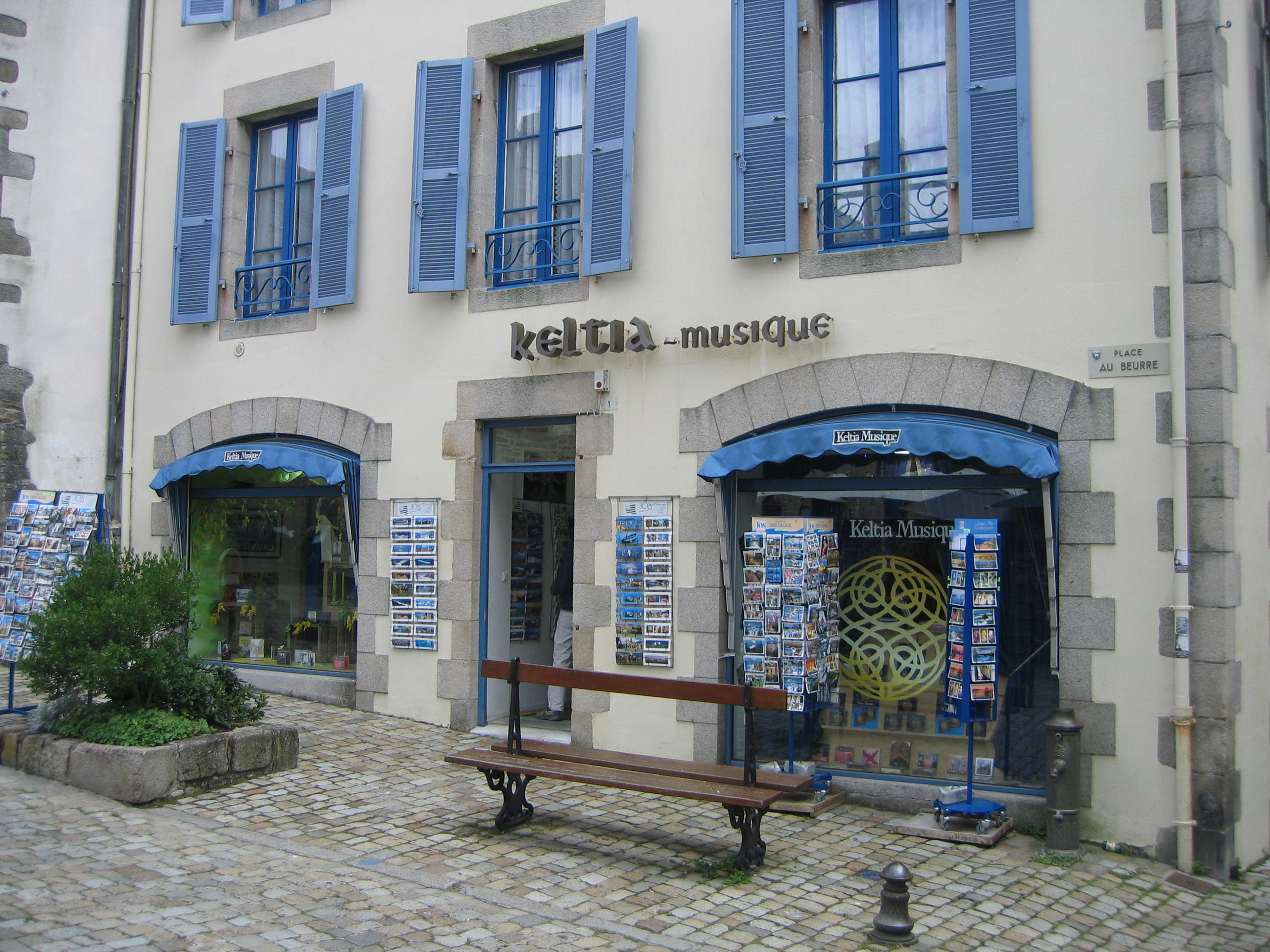
The Keltia Musique store in 2008

The company was founded by Hervé Le Meur, co-founder of Bagad Kemper and Bodadeg ar Sonerion (B.A.S.), who died in 1996. Le Meur sold Celtic music records and bagad instruments in his basement, apart from his other activities and his work as an accountant. Customers that visited the basement store include Alan Stivell. He later moved to the historic city center of Quimper in order to share his passion and make it known to the public. The store in Quimper was opened in 1978, and Le Meur also began producing records under the Keltia Musique label at this time. The first records produced were by the Bagad Kemper.

In France, the company distributes music from Ireland, Scotland, Wales, Galicia, Cornwall, the Isle of Man and Brittany. The beginning of Keltia coincided with the decline of vinyl and the arrival of the CD. In 1986, Keltia Musique released its first five CDs of Breton music: Bagad Kemper's War an dachenn, Dan Ar Braz's Music For the Silences To Come, Dominig Bouchaud's Vibrations, Sonerien Du's Amzer Glaz, and one compilation album. The label's musical styles range from traditional to progressive.

In the early 1980s, Celtic rock became popular with bands such as Horslips, Clannad, The Waterboys, The Silencers, Moving Hearts, U2, and The Pogues. Most of these bands had music distributed by Keltia. By 1990, the company had a catalog of 500 works. As the customer base expanded, the company began exporting internationally. In 1987, at Midem, the company met with the producer of Texan singer Michelle Shocked. As a result, Keltia distributed The Texas Campfire Tapes.

Since 1989, Hervé's son Alain Le Meur, along with Alain's brother Hervé, runs the family business. Alain's wife Eleanor drafts contracts in English and his brother Pol designs the album covers. On the covers, the Breton language is used as well as French and English. Keltia's catalog still has about 500 works. Artists found in the catalog include those produced by Keltia, such as the Bagad Kemper, Dan Ar Braz, Les Goristes, Red Cardell and Michel Tonnerre, as well as artists distributed by the label, such as Sinéad O'Connor and Loreena McKennitt. In addition to albums, Keltia Musique also sells sheet music and Breton musical instruments.

== Artists distributed by Keltia ==
- The Celtic Social Club
- Bagad Kemper
- Dan Ar Braz
- Red Cardell
- Loreena McKennitt
- Sinéad O'Connor
- The Chieftains
- The Dubliners
- The Silencers
- Clannad
- Cécile Corbel
- Solas
- Lúnasa
- Altan
- Dónal Lunny
- Skolvan
- Gwendal
- Gilles Servat
- Louise Ebrel
- Triskell
- Téada
- Les Sœurs Goadec
- Pat O'May
- Jimmie O'Neill
- Louis Capart
- Michel Tonnerre
- Les Ours du Scorff
- Bagad Brieg
- Les Goristes
- Gilles Le Bigot
- Gwennyn
- Stone Age
- Maxime Piolot
- Alain Genty
- Barzaz
- Kornog
- Ozan Trio
- Lors Jouin
- Nicolas Quémener
- David Hopkins
