= Sonerien Du =

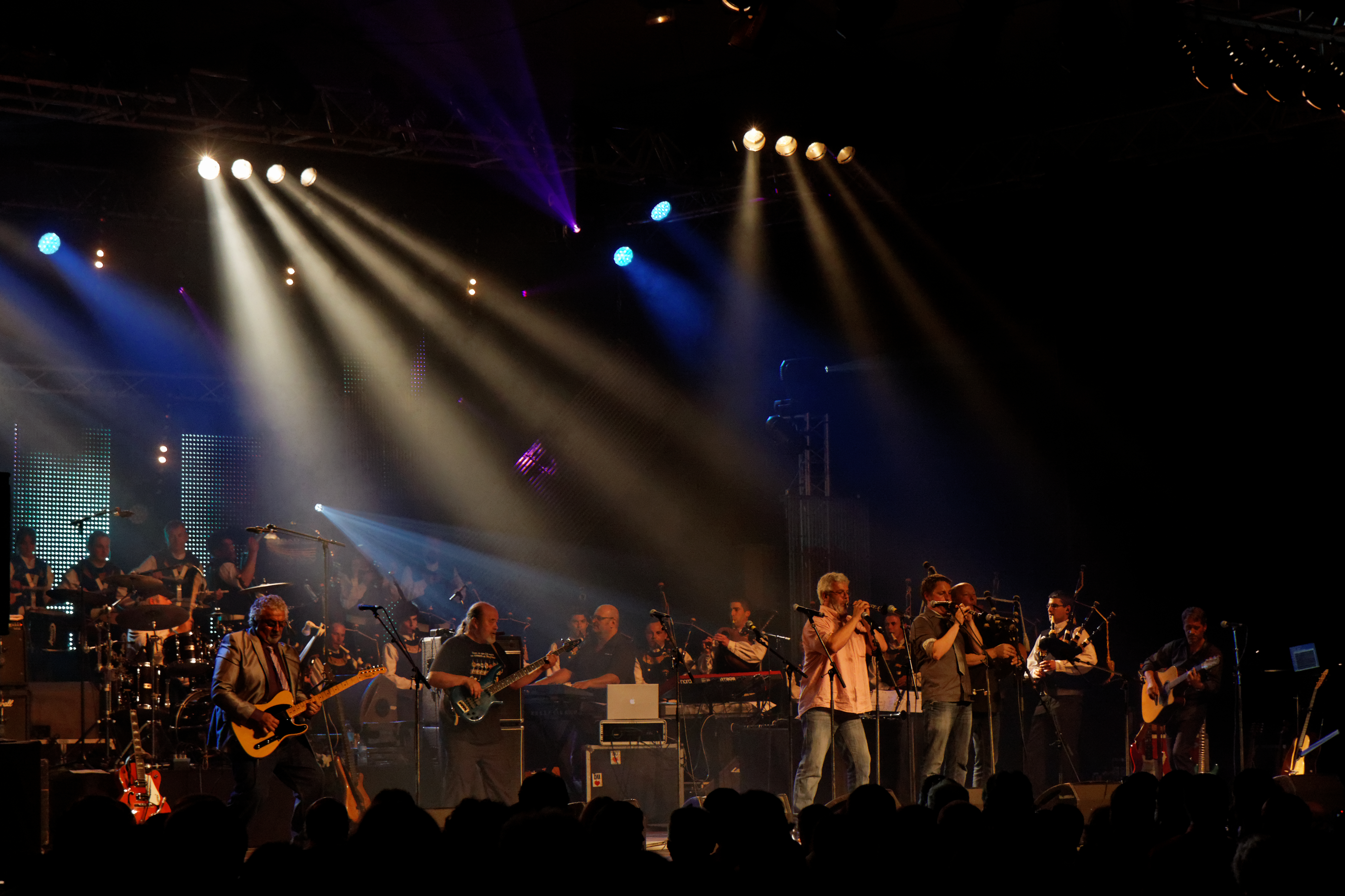
The Sonerien Du at the Festival de Cornouaille in 2012

Sonerien Du is a group of Breton music adapted for the dances in Fest Noz. The group was born in 1972, in Alan Stivell's trail, harpist of the Celtic Revival. Driving force of the Breton culture, the group crossed periods of concerts and festoù-noz, with a traditional and modern music at the same time, always respecting dance. It recorded 20 albums over 40 years.

== History ==
...

== Discography ==
- 1972: Breton Ball
- 1974: Breton Ball vol. 2
- 1976: Sonerien Du vol. 3
- 1978: Gwerz Penmarc'h
- 1980: Feunteun an aod
- 1982: Ten Years
- 1984: Roue marc' h
- 1986: Amzer Glaz
- 1988: Tradition vibrante
- 1989: Tredan
- 1992: Etre Mor ha Douar
- 1994: Puzzle
- 1996: Reder Noz
- 1998: Steïr
- 2000: Noz-Live (concert)
- 2002: Le bel âge... ("The Beautiful Age...")
- 2004: Puzzle 2
- 2006: Be new!
- 2008: Liv an Amzer
- 2010: La Komplèt'
- 2011: Live 2011
- 2012: Seizh
- 2012: Live'niversaire (40 years)
- 2013: Puzzle 2
- 2014: Live Brodeuses 2014
- 2015: Frankiz
- 2017: 45 Ans De Fiesta (Live)
- 2019: Kalon
