= Rubina Rana =

Pakistani Norwegian politician

Rubina Rana (27 May 1956 – 15 July 2003) was a Pakistani Norwegian politician for the Labour Party.

Born in Pakistan, she grew up in Karachi and Lahore and migrated to Rakkestad, Norway in 1978. She became involved in local politics in Oslo, and in 1995 she was elected to serve in Oslo city council. She served two terms.

She received national attention in 1999, when she was selected to chair the committee responsible for planning the Norwegian Constitution Day celebration in Oslo. The first non-Western immigrant to hold this position, she received multiple death threats from extremists.

She died in 2003. In 2006 a street at Grønland, Oslo was named after her. She was the first non-Western immigrant to receive this honor.
