= Ed Boyd =

British guitarist

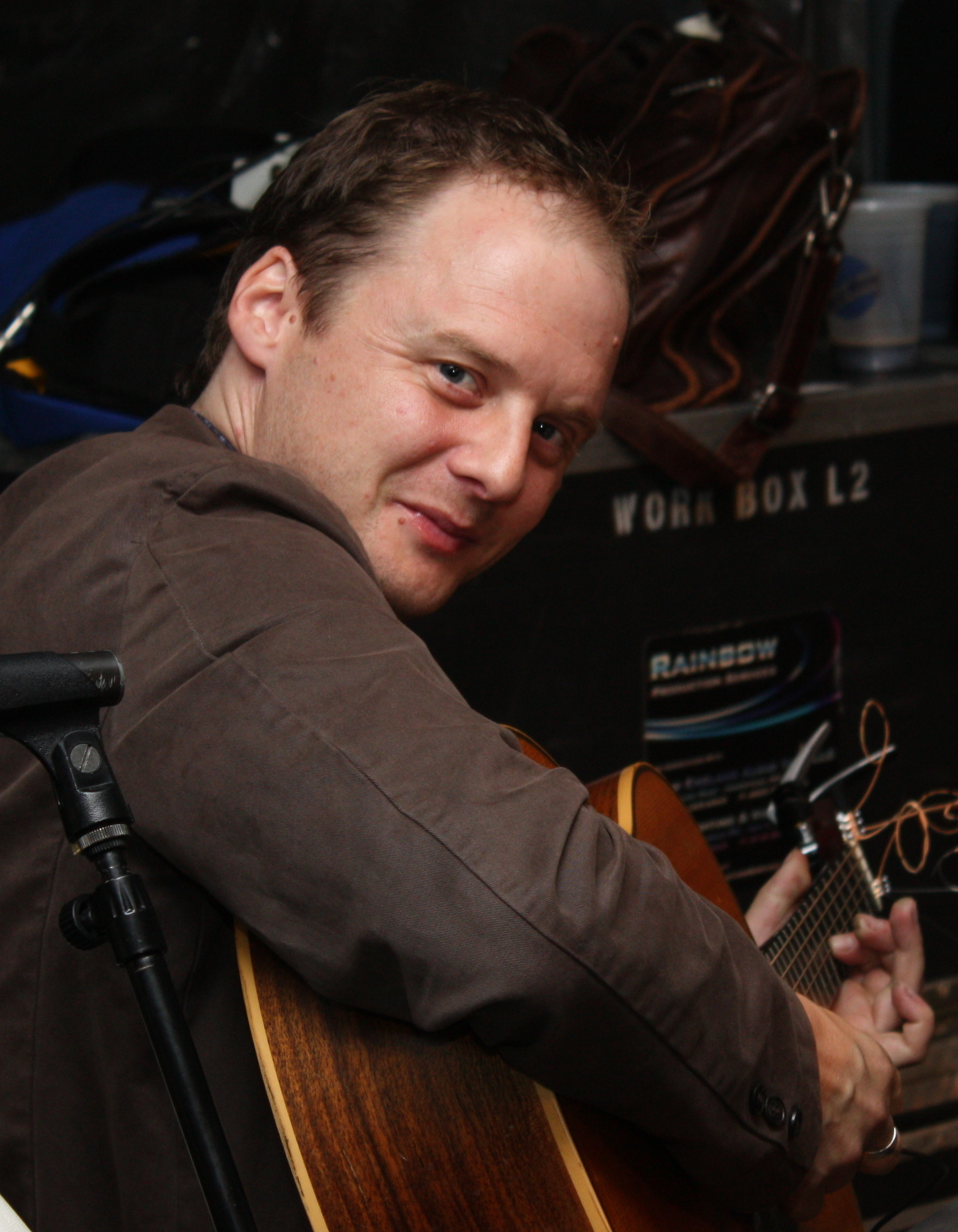
- Boyd in 2008

Background information
- Genres: Folk
- Occupation: Musician
- Instrument(s): Guitar, Cittern

Ed Boyd is a guitarist from Bath, England. He is the current guitarist for Lúnasa, but is best known as a longtime member of the Celtic folk group Flook. He has also played in the group Red Ciel, and accompanied artists such as Kate Rusby, Karen Matheson and Michael McGoldrick.

More recently he has released an album with Celtic-Bluegrass band The Scoville Unit and continues to play with a multitude of bands including Cara Dillon, the Mike McGoldrick Band and Guidewires.

He is a regular tutor at Burwell Bash. He also speaks fluent French and Spanish
