= Flook (band) =

Anglo-Irish band

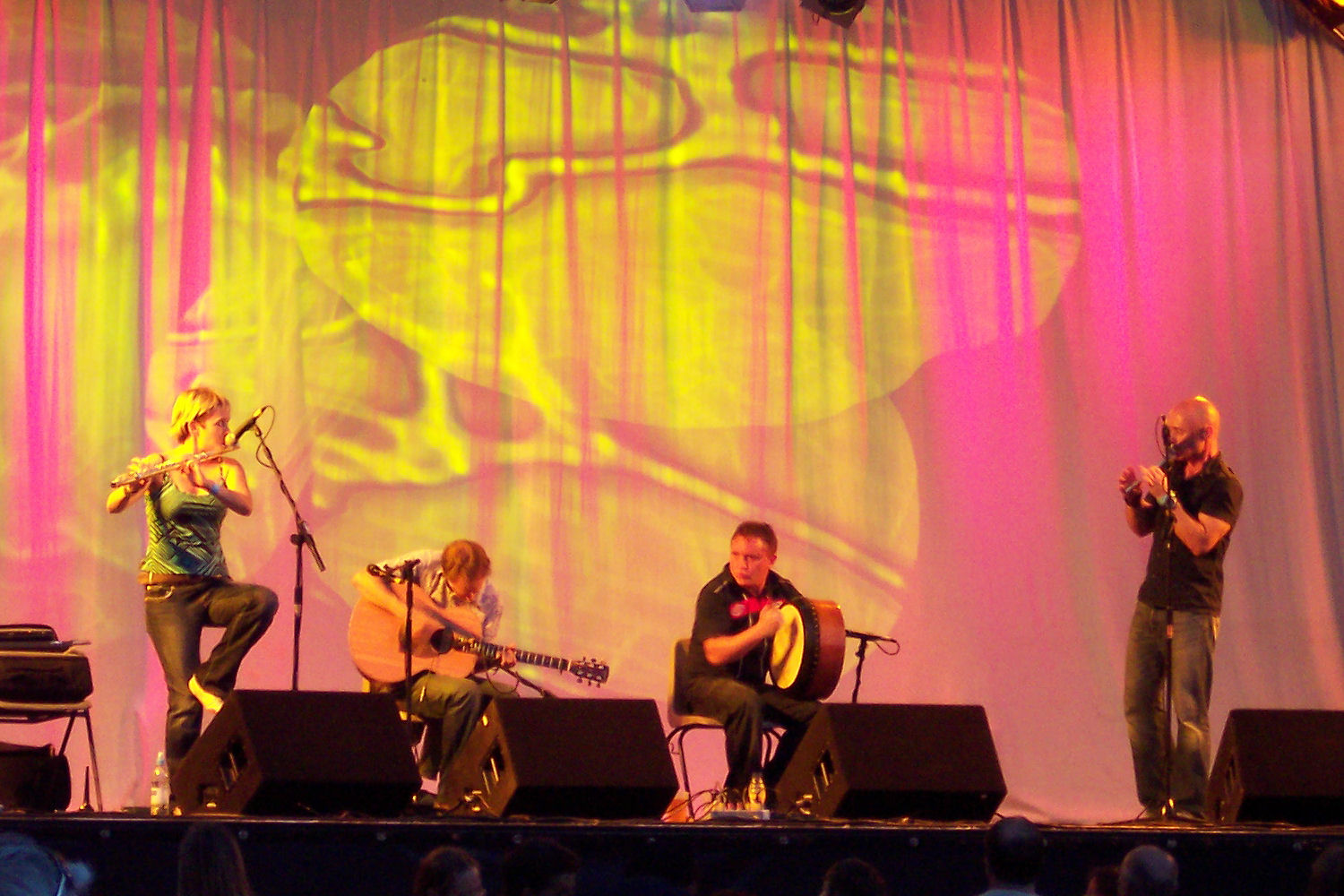
- Flook at the 2006 Wickham Festival. Left to right: Sarah Allen, Ed Boyd, John Joe Kelly, Brian Finnegan

Background information
- Origin: Ireland and United Kingdom
- Genres: Celtic music
- Years active: 1995–2008, 2013-present
- Label: Flatfish Records
- Members: Sarah Allen; Brian Finnegan; Ed Boyd; John Joe Kelly
- Past members: Becky Morris; Michael McGoldrick; Damien O'Kane
- Website: http://www.flook.co.uk/

Flook are an Anglo-Irish band playing traditional-style instrumental music, much of it penned by the band themselves. Their music is typified by extremely fast, sometimes percussive, flute and whistle atop complex guitar and bodhrán rhythms. Flook is made up of Brian Finnegan, Sarah Allen, Ed Boyd and John Joe Kelly.

== History ==
The band was formed in 1995, originally by Becky Morris, with three flute-playing friends Sarah Allen, Brian Finnegan and Michael McGoldrick, (who left in 1997 to join Capercaillie). The band was briefly known as Three Nations Flutes.

Flook's 10th anniversary tour included a concert at the Purcell Room (on 7 November 2005) as part of a week of "Folk in the Fall" on London's South Bank and another at the new Sage Gateshead concert hall on the south bank of the River Tyne on 10 November 2005. Their third studio album, Haven, was released in October 2005.

In December 2008 the band sent a Christmas message saying they were disbanding. "We wanted to wish you a very Happy Christmas and also to share some news with you," said a band press release. "After 13-plus years, hundreds of gigs, millions of miles traveled together and countless brilliant times, we've decided to call it a day. It might be forever or a prolonged pause, who knows, but we're all still great friends and will always remain so. This might sound like a cliché but it is deeply truthful."

The group reformed briefly for an appearance on the BBC Northern Ireland programme, Blas Ceoil and came back together again in 2013. They restarted to perform live regularly, touring the world with rapturous feedbacks: they brought their distinguishable sound in great venues such as the Kings Place in London, the "Soma Festival" in Belfast, the Bolshoi Theatre in Moscow and the "Star Pine's cafe" in Tokyo.

On Friday 12 January 2018, the group posted a photo of themselves, with the caption "It’s a new year and we’re in Bath (United Kingdom) rehearsing new tunes", reported by Lynette Fay on BBC Radio Ulster's Folk Club on 14 January 2018, who described the band as "iconic, ground-breaking, progressive and all-round brilliant".

Flook's fourth album, "Ancora", was released on April 12 2019. Folk Radio UK praised the album, writing "expectations more than fully met – simply a brilliant album". Bright Young Folk wrote that "«Ancora» is the highest peak of their more than twenty year old career."

Their most recent album, "Sanju" (Japanese for 'thirty') was released in March 2025 to celebrate their thirtieth year together as a band. It consists of 13 new compositions in five tracks. Having had a year off touring in 2024, they are having an international tour to celebrate their anniversary.

== Band members ==
- Sarah Allen plays flute and accordion. She has also been a member of the Barely Works, Bigjig, The Happy End Big Band and The Waterboys.
- Brian Finnegan plays wooden flutes, low whistle and tin whistle. He has been a member of Upstairs in a Tent (originally Gan Ainm), Maalstroom, Aquarium and KAN.
- Ed Boyd plays guitars and bouzouki. He became a permanent member of Lunasa in 2012. He is a former member of Red Ciel.
- John Joe Kelly plays bodhrán and mandolin. He has also worked with Altan and Paul Brady and is a session musician.
- Damien O'Kane joined the band temporarily in 2008, playing banjo and tenor guitar as well as singing.
- Michael McGoldrick, plays wooden flute, low whistle, uilleann pipes and tin whistle, left Flook in 1997 to join Capercaillie.

== Discography ==
Albums

- Flook! Live! (1996) Small CD 9405
- Flatfish (1999) Flatfish Records 002CD
- Rubai (2002) Flatfish Records 004CD
- Haven (2005) Flatfish Records 005CD
- Ancora (2019) Flatfish Records 006CD
- Sanju (2025) Flatfish Records 007cd

Contributing artist

- The Rough Guide to Irish Music (1996)

== Performances (selection) ==
- Celtic Connections, Glasgow
- Bath Folk Festival, Bath
- Wickham Festival, Wickham
- Irish Folk & Celtic Music, Balve
- Kings Place, London
- Bolshoi Theatre, Moscow
- Soma Festival, Belfast
- Sidmouth Folk Festival, Sidmouth
- Star Pine's Cafe, Tokyo
- Cambridge Folk Festival, Cambridge
- Irish night, Pagazzano
- Celtic Colours, Cape Breton Island
