= Acoustic Guitars (band) =

Danish musical quintet

Acoustic Guitars is a Danish musical quintet influenced by Spanish, Arab and Indian music. It was formed by Mikkel Nordsø, Christian Ratzer, and Steen Kyed. Later Klavs Nordsø joined, and recently Ole Theill.

On the 1987 album Acoustic Guitars the famous NHØP appears as a guest star.

== Members ==
- Mikkel Nordsø: Guitar
- Christian Ratzer: Guitar
- Steen Kyed: Guitar
- Klavs Nordsø: Percussion
- Ole Theill: Tablas

== Discography ==
On Sundance Records:

- Acoustic Guitars (1987)
- Gajos in disguise (1990)
- Out of the Blue (1995)
- Arabesque (2002)

On Columbia Records:

- Pa-Papegøje! (1994) ('I østen stiger solen op' with Nanna)
- Tangokat (1995) ('Bim bam busse' with Nanna)
- Hej Frede! (1996) ('Dyrene i Afrika' with Nanna)
