= Didier Squiban =

French pianist and composer (born 1959)

Didier Squiban (born 23 September 1959 in Ploudalmézeau (Finistère)) is a French pianist and composer.

His musical work is a combination of traditional Breton music, jazz improvisation and classical romanticism and has added the piano to the repertoire of modern Breton music.

He has been influenced by Duke Ellington, Keith Jarrett, Charlie Parker and Bill Evans as well as Debussy, Stravinsky, Erik Satie, Darius Milhaud, Schönberg and Glenn Gould. In 1993, he worked as the accompanying pianist for the Breton singer Yann-Fañch Kemener in the acclaimed live show Héritage des Celtes (The Heritage of the Celts) and thereby got closer in touch with the music of his home region Brittany. In 1997, on the island of his ancestors, Molène, he recorded his first Breton solo piano album: "Molène".

== Discography ==
=== Solo piano ===
- Molène Saison II (2013)
- Tournée des chapelles 2004 (2005)
- Ballades (2003)
- Trilogie pour piano (2001)
  - Rozbras (2001)
  - Porz Gwenn (1999)
  - Molène (1997)
- Concert Lorient (recorded at the Festival Interceltique de Lorient) (2000)

=== With band ===
- Bangor - Formation Sirius (L'orchestre de Jazz de Bretagne) (1995)
- Jazz à Vauban (1994)
- Tendances (1990)
- La Plage (2006)

=== With orchestra ===
- Symphonie Iroise (2004)
- Symphonie Bretagne (2000)

=== Cooperations ===
- Manu Lann Huel chante Léo Ferré - Lann Huel/Squiban/Trévarin (2003)
- Kimiad - Kemener/Squiban (2000)
- Île-Exil - Kemener/Squiban (1996)
- Penn-Ar-Bed/Brest 96 - Didier Squiban & An Tour Tan (1996)
- Karnag "Pierre Lumière"(1996)
- Enez Eusa - Kemener/Squiban (1995)
- Héritage des Celtes en concert - Dan Ar Braz (1995)
- Live - Didier Squiban & An Tour Tan (1997)
