= Cécile Corbel =

French musician

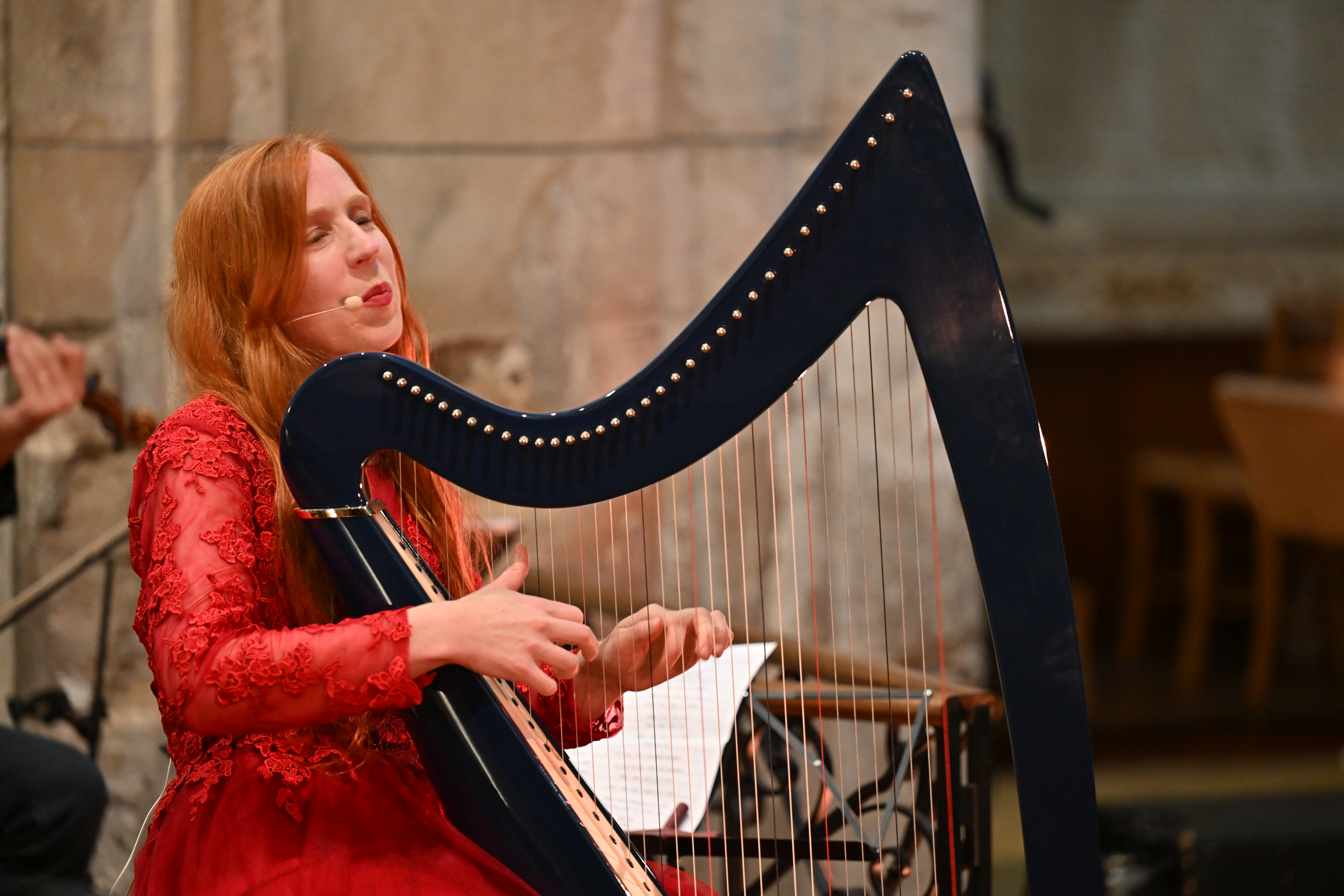
- Corbel performing in Bonneval in 2024

Background information
- Born: 28 March 1980 (age 46); Pont-Croix, Finistère, France
- Genres: Celtic, world
- Occupations: Singer-songwriter, harpist
- Instruments: Vocals, celtic harp
- Years active: 2002–present
- Labels: Keltia Musique, Polydor
- Website: cecile-corbel.com

Cécile Corbel (born 28 March 1980) is a French and Breton singer, harpist, and composer. She has released five albums of original music and worked for Studio Ghibli as a composer for its 2010 film Arrietty. Corbel sings in several languages including French, Italian, Breton, and English and has done songs in Spanish, German, Japanese, Irish, and Turkish.

== Early life and education ==
Cécile Corbel was born in Pont-Croix on 28 March 1980. As a child, she traveled all throughout Brittany with her parents, who had a traveling marionette show. She first learned to play guitar, and discovered the Celtic harp as a teenager during a concert by Greek harpist Elisa Vellia, who later became her teacher. At age 18, after obtaining a baccalauréat scientifique, she moved to Paris to study. She then entered the École du Louvre and earned a MAS in archaeology. She first performed in pubs and the streets of Paris, and gave her first official concert at the pub, Ti Jos, in 2002.

== Career ==
=== Professional debut ===
In 2005, she released an EP with six tracks, Harpe celtique et chants du monde. After she signed with the record label Keltia Musique, her first studio album was released in 2006. SongBook 1 contained Breton, Welsh, and Irish songs. After this release, she began to go on tour. In 2006, she went to Australia, where she performed at a French festival organized by the Alliance française of Adelaide. She opened Laurent Voulzy's concert at Olympia Hall in Paris, and also shared the stage with Altan, Lúnasa, Alan Stivell, Carlos Núñez Muñoz, Dan Ar Braz, Hélène Flaherty, Ousmane Touré, and Ariana Savall. She performed in many countries including Germany, Switzerland, Italy, England, Estonia, the Czech Republic, Poland, the Netherlands, the United States, Paraguay, and Burma. In 2008, SongBook vol. 2 was released, with the first 10 of the 12 songs composed by Corbel.

In 2009, she played the role of Anne of Brittany in the rock opera, Anne de Bretagne. Songwriter Alan Simon chose Cécile Corbel after having difficulty finding someone for the role. Also participating in the project were other musicians such as Tri Yann and Fairport Convention. The show was staged at the end of June 2009 at the Château des ducs de Bretagne in Nantes, and was preceded by an album in which over 200 musicians participated.

=== Work with Studio Ghibli ===
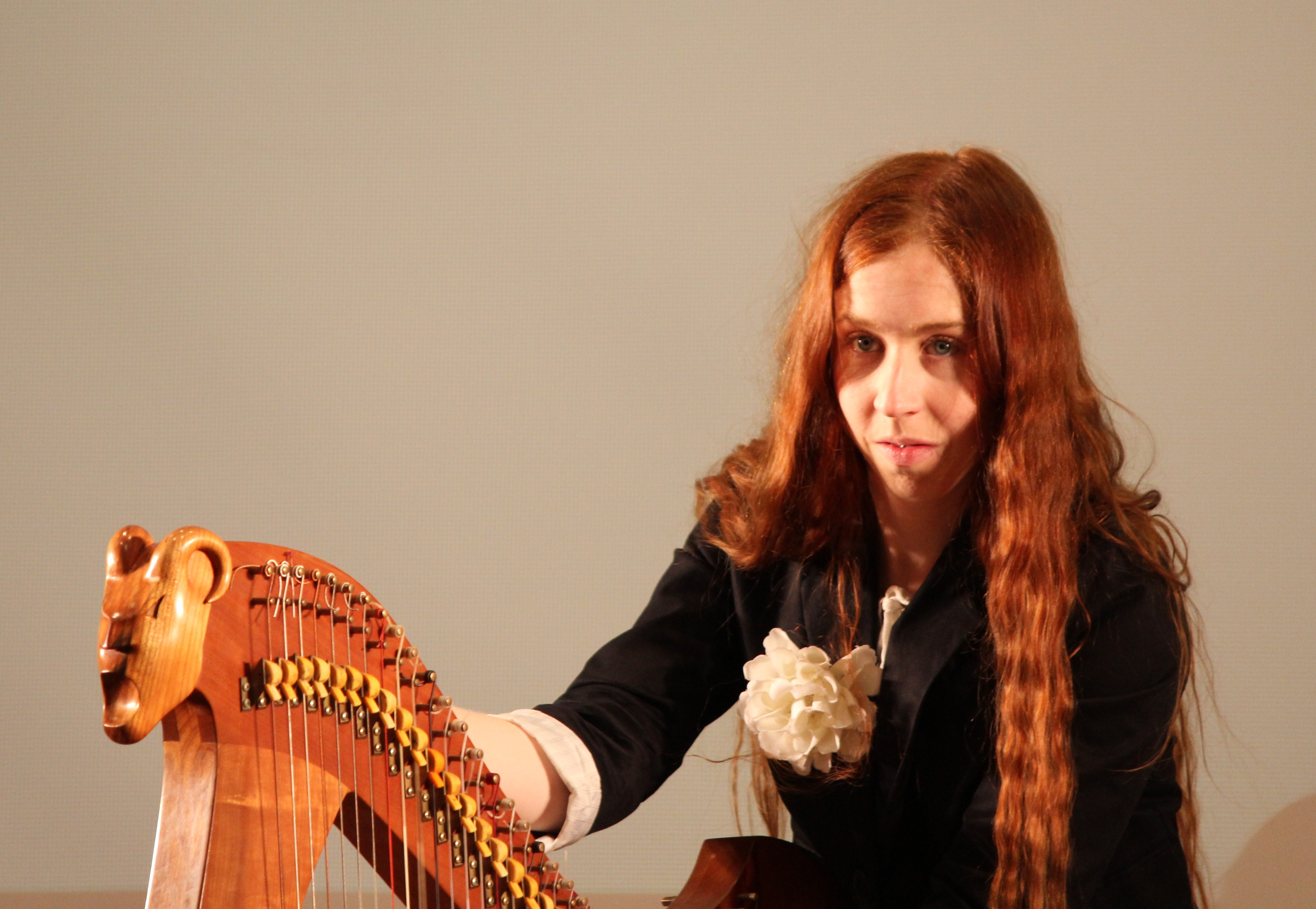
Corbel in Tokyo for the release of the soundtrack of the film Arrietty in 2010

After promotion ended for SongBook vol. 2, Corbel still had some promo albums left, so she sent them to people she admired. She sent one to Studio Ghibli because she had been a fan of their films for years. At the time, Arrietty was in pre-production and producer Toshio Suzuki wanted a Celtic-inspired film score. Less than ten days later, she received an email from Studio Ghibli about her CD. The envelope, because it was handwritten, had caught the eye of Suzuki, and he had listened to the CD. He was captivated by Corbel's voice and the sound of the harp, and played the CD for the film's director and Yamaha Music. As a result, Corbel was assigned to write the title song of the film. She was later asked to write more songs. By 2009, she was asked to compose the whole score. This was the first time a non-Japanese composer had worked with the studio.

The score combines the musical styles of Celtic folk music, medieval Turkish songs, Baroque madrigals, and Irish marches. It was recorded in France with a small orchestra including acoustic guitar, bass, a string quartet, bagpipes, Irish flutes, bodhrán, percussion instruments, and accordion. The soundtrack album won "Best Original Soundtrack Album" at the 2011 Japan Gold Disc Awards. It also became a RIAJ-certified gold record in Japan, where more than 200,000 copies were sold.

=== 2011 to present ===
In June 2011, the third studio album, SongBook vol. 3 – Renaissance was released.

In 2012, Corbel along with her long-time collaborator, Simon Caby were invited to Malaysia to perform at the 11th edition of the French Art and Film Festival 2012 (FAFF 2012) organized by the Alliance Française Kuala Lumpur and the Embassy of France in Malaysia. She performed at HELP University, Kuala Lumpur on 8 June and at the Golden Sands Resort, Penang on 9 June as part of the 50th anniversary of the Alliance Française Penang.

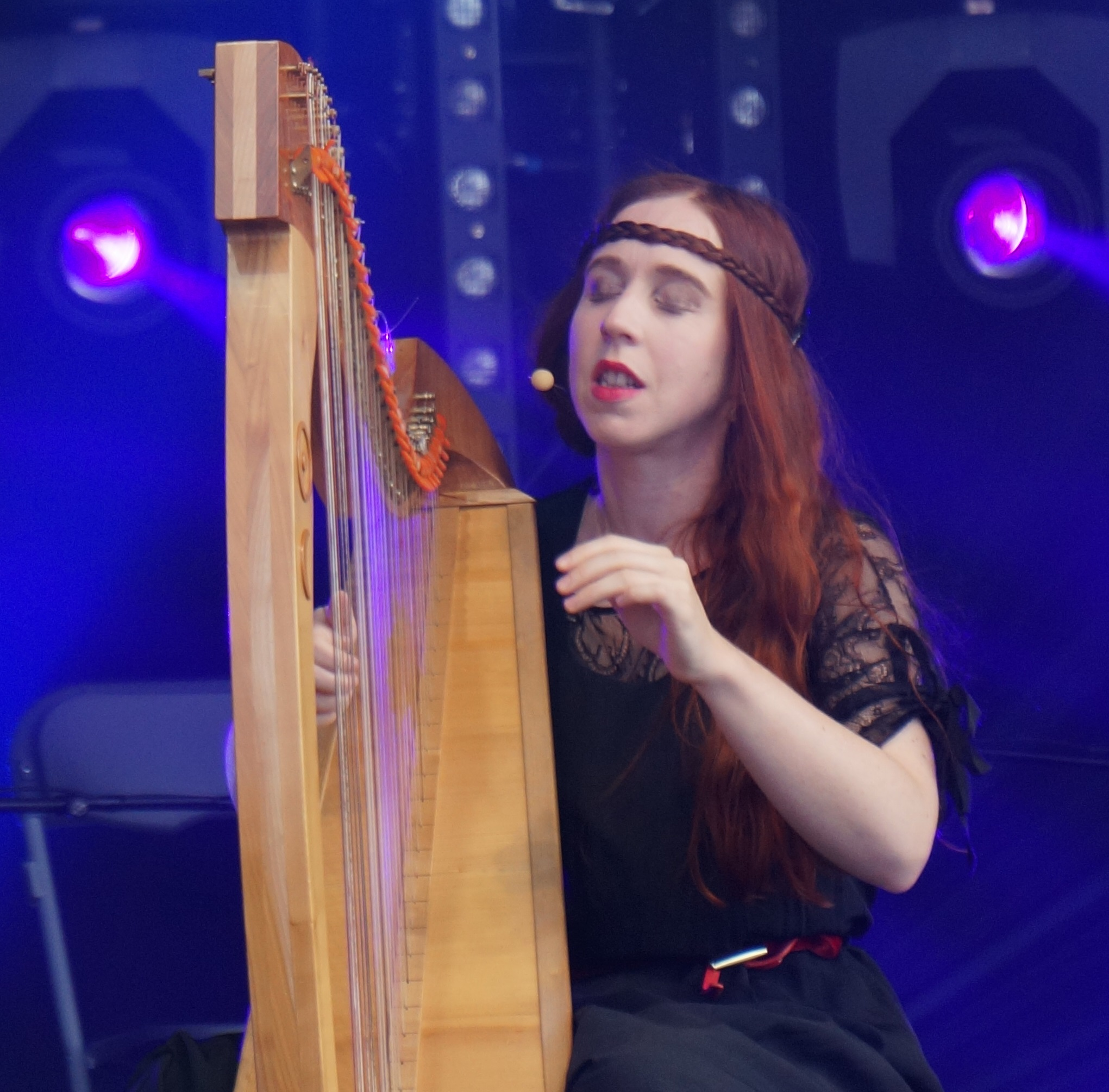
Corbel playing a celtic harp in 2014

In early 2013, Corbel took part in La Nuit de la Bretagne, performing along with Dan Ar Braz at the Zeniths of Nantes, Lille, and Caen. The fourth studio album, SongBook vol. 4 – Roses, was released on 24 June 2013. This album had influences from Mediterranean, medieval, and world music, including Japanese and Celtic music. It contains songs in French, English, Breton, and even Judaeo-Spanish ("Hija Mia"). Most of the twelve tracks are self-composed, and the album incorporates Breton and Irish traditional themes. It also includes a cover of "The Riddle", a song by English singer Nik Kershaw.

In 2013, Corbel wrote songs and co-composed (with Fabien Cali) the film score for the wildlife documentary, Land of the Bears. The soundtrack album was released 26 February 2014 by Polydor Records. Corbel sings five songs on the album. She also sings and plays harp on "Les Nuits Urbaines", the sixth track on Stanislas' album Ma Solitude, released on 28 April 2014.

On 26 June 2014, Corbel released a single, "Entendez-Vous", from her upcoming album. Her fifth studio album, La Fiancée, was released on 6 October 2014. All twelve songs on the album were written by Corbel, with music co-composed by Simon Caby. The album's musical style is a mixture of classical and pop music. She released her sixth studio album, Vagabonde, on 4 October 2016.

Her seventh studio album, Enfant du vent, was released on 29 March 2019. Inspired by her son, the album centers around childhood but is aimed at all ages. The track list include two cover songs from Ghibli films—"Tonari no Totoro" from My Neighbor Totoro and "Sayonara no Natsu" (duet with Misaki Iwasa) from From Up on Poppy Hill.

SongBook vol. 5 was released on 30 September 2021. Corbel's ninth studio album, La Fille du Verseau, was released on 7 July 2023. All songs on the album were composed by Laurent Tixier and performed by Corbel. Her tenth studio album, Graal, was released on 13 September 2024 and was inspired by Arthurian legend.

== Personal life ==
Her lifelong partner is songwriter Simon Caby, who is also her co-composer.

== Collaborations ==
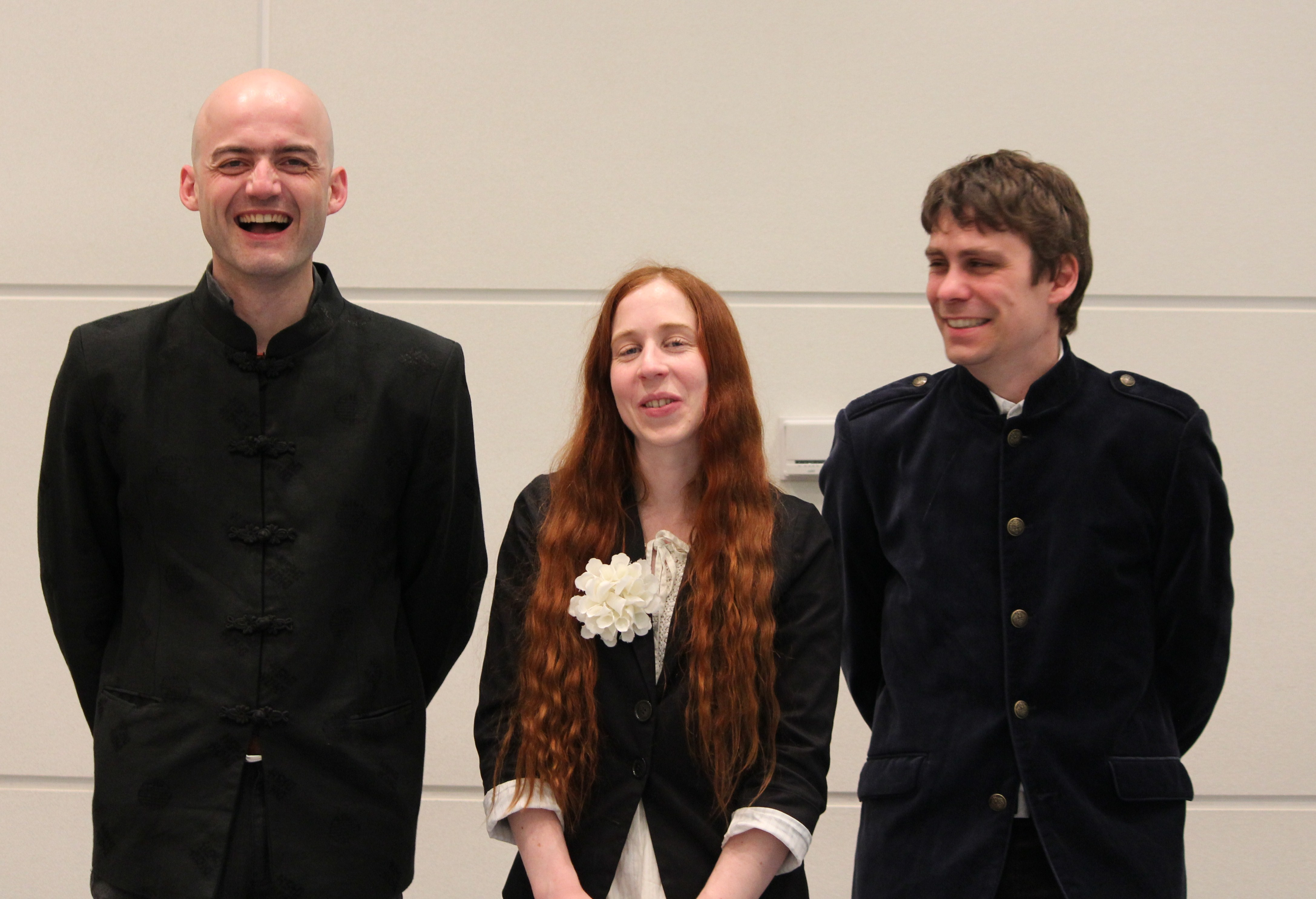
Pascal Boucaud, Corbel, and Cyril Maurin in May 2010

List of musicians that Corbel performs with at concerts:

- Cécile Corbel – harp and voice
- Cyril Maurin – guitars
- Pascal Boucaud – bass and backing vocals
- Julien Grattard – cello
- Christophe Piot – percussion

== Discography ==
- SongBook 1 (2006)
- SongBook vol. 2 (2008)
- SongBook vol. 3 – Renaissance (2011)
- SongBook vol. 4 – Roses (2013)
- La Fiancée (2014)
- Vagabonde (2016)
- Enfant du Vent (2019)
- SongBook vol. 5 – Notes (2021)
- La Fille du Verseau (2023)
- Graal (2024)

== Accolades ==
=== Japan Gold Disc Awards ===
Year	Nominee / work	Award	Result
2011	Arrietty Soundtrack	Best Original Soundtrack Album	Won

=== Tokyo Anime Awards ===
Year	Nominee / work	Award	Result
2011	Cécile Corbel – Arrietty	Best Music	Won
