= Dance to the Holy Man =

Studio album by the Silencers
- Released: 1991
- Genre: Rock, pop, folk-pop
- Label: RCA
- Producer: John Leckie, Mark Wallis, Jimme O'Neill

The Silencers chronology
A Blues for Buddha (1988)	Dance to the Holy Man (1991)	Seconds of Pleasure (1993)

Dance to the Holy Man is the third album by the Scottish band the Silencers, released in 1991. It peaked at No. 39 on the UK Albums Chart. The first single was "Bulletproof Heart", although its release was delayed by the Gulf War and RCA's concern about the song title. The band supported the album with a UK tour.

== Production ==
The album was produced by John Leckie, Mark Wallis, and frontman Jimme O'Neill. Its songs were written by O'Neill, who also painted the cover art. JJ Gilmour joined the band during the recording sessions. "Bulletproof Heart", about returning to Scotland from London, is a version of a song O'Neill wrote with Fingerprintz. The rhythm track to "Robinson Crusoe in New York" was in part supplied from a recording of a sputtering taxi cab engine.

== Critical reception ==
Professional ratings
Review scores
Source	Rating
AllMusic	2.5/5 stars
Alternative Rock	5/10
Calgary Herald	B+
Chicago Tribune	2.5/4 stars
The Republican	4/5 stars
Record-Journal	A−
The Rolling Stone Album Guide	3/5 stars
The State	3.5/5 stars
The Times-Transcript	4/5 stars

The Calgary Herald said that the songs "gently evoke the search for meaning in textured harmonies and guitar-based instrumentals, occasionally breaking into soft, even Beatlesque uptempo rock." The Chicago Tribune concluded, "For a hefty portion of the album ... the Silencers' honking instrumentation scuttles what might have been decent songs." The Province called it "intelligent, atmospheric but often oblique pop and rock".

The Kingston Whig-Standard labeled the album "a minor masterpiece" and noted that the band "take chunks of familiar sound and make it original." The State said that it was better than the band's previous album, A Blues for Buddha. The Bay Area Reporter considered it a blend of Dead Can Dance and the Waterboys and listed it among the best albums of 1991.

== Track listing ==
No.	Title	Length
1.	"Singing Ginger"	1:40
2.	"Robinson Crusoe in New York"	5:52
3.	"Bulletproof Heart"	4:58
4.	"The Art of Self Deception"	5:17
5.	"I Want You"	4:05
6.	"Just Can't Be Bothered"	4:32
7.	"Cameras and Colleseums"	1:03
8.	"One Inch of Heaven"	7:32
9.	"Hey Mr. Bank Manager"	3:39
10.	"This Is Serious / John the Revelator"	5:46
11.	"Afraid to Love"	3:26
12.	"Rosanne"	3:53
13.	"Electric Storm"	5:51
14.	"When the Night Comes Down"	3:24
15.	"Robinson Rap"	1:01
