= Red Cardell =

French rock band

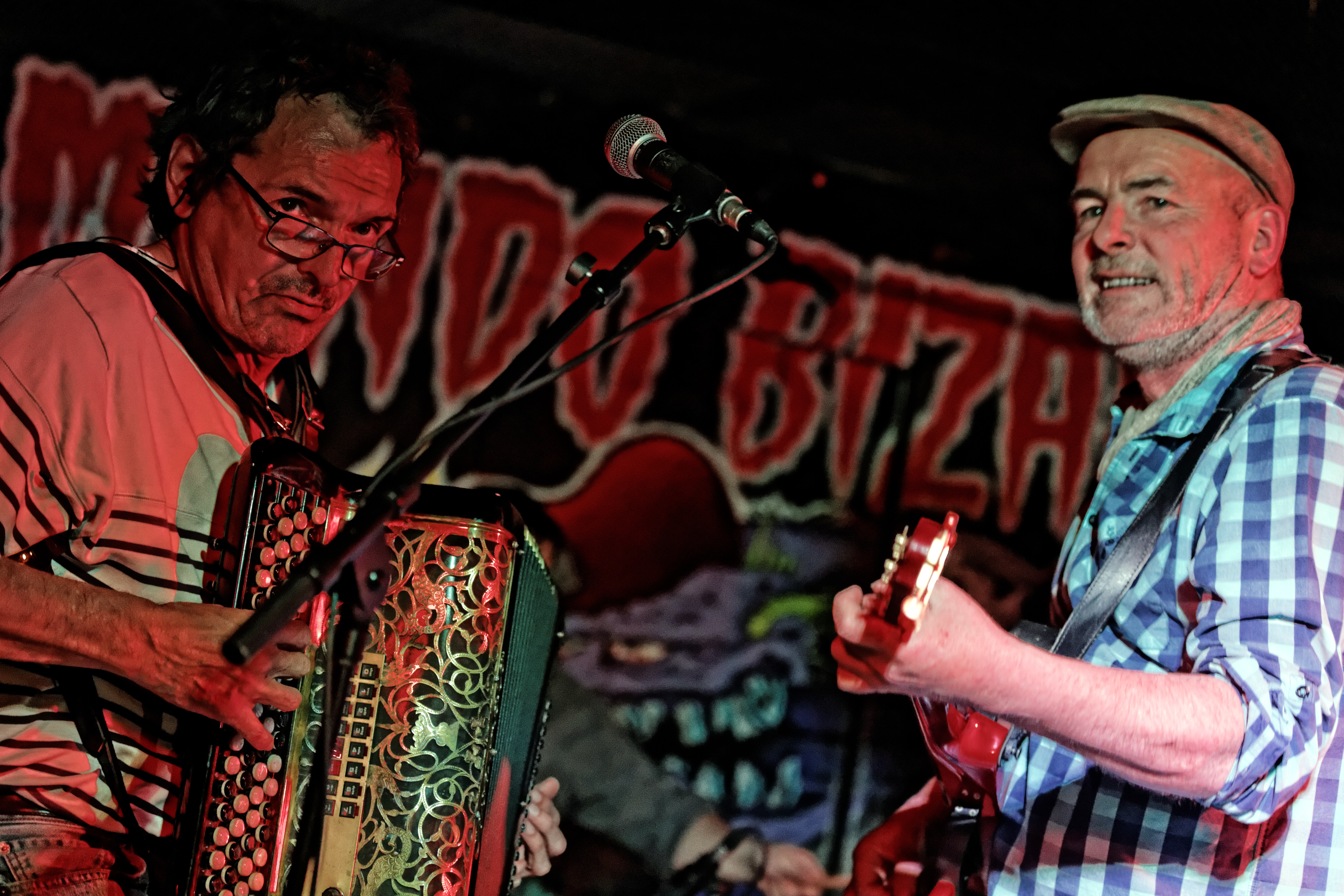
- Red Cardell 2016 with Jean-Michel Moal and Jean-Pierre Riou

Background information
- Origin: Quimper, Brittany, France
- Genres: Rock, Celtic rock, world music, chanson réaliste
- Years active: 1992–present
- Labels: Kas Ha Bar, Keltia Musique
- Members: Jean-Pierre Riou; Jean-Michel Moal; Pierre Sangra; Hibu Corbel
- Past members: Manu Masko; Mathieu Péquériau; Ian Proêrer; Patrick Goyat; Christophe Poignant
- Website: redcardell.com

Red Cardell is a French, Breton rock band, that mixes Breton music with rock, folk, blues, world music and chanson réaliste.

The group was formed in 1992 by Jean-Pierre Riou (vocals, guitars), Jean-Michel Moal (accordion) and Ian Proërer (drums). With the departure of the latter in 2001, Manu Masko became the drummer. He left in 2015.

In 2011, the band added Mathieu Péquériau (harmonica, washboard) as a new member, some months before Jean-Michel Moal had to take a break from the group due to health problems. He returned in 2015.

From 2012 to 2015, the band was joined on stage by two additional musicians : Ronan Le Bars (bagpipes, whistles), (Dan Ar Braz / Héritage des Celtes) and Pierre Stéphan (fiddle), and had a joint show with Bagad Kemper. During that same time period, the five band members were involved in The Celtic Social Club, alongside Jimme O'Neill, leader of (The Silencers) and bassman Richard Puaud.

In December 2015, Jean-Pierre Riou and Jean-Michel Moal, the 1992 co-founders of the group, joined forces again after four years of separation. In this new collective, they are accompanied by the multi-instrumentalist Pierre Sangra, partner of the band since the album Naître, and drummer Hibu Corbel.

They are considered by music critics to be one of the best Breton bands of this time, in the footsteps of Alan Stivell and Dan Ar Braz, precursors of the Celtic wave of the 1970s, having learned to combine rock and contemporary music with traditional music.

== Biography ==
Red Cardell, one of the most famous bands from Brittany, (the peninsula of Celtic identity in north-western France), is essentially a live band. Formed in Quimper in 1992, since then has recorded sixteen albums including five live and played at nearly two thousand concerts all over Europe and North America, including famous stages in France such as: Vieilles Charrues Festival, Eurockéennes, Les Francofolies de La Rochelle, Printemps de Bourges, Festival Interceltique de Lorient, Le Zénith Nantes Métropole and Paris-Bercy Arena. They also played in Ukraine, Finland, Germany, Belgium, Luxembourg, Switzerland, Czech Republic, Slovakia, Spain, Italy, Cyprus, West Indies, the United States and Canada.

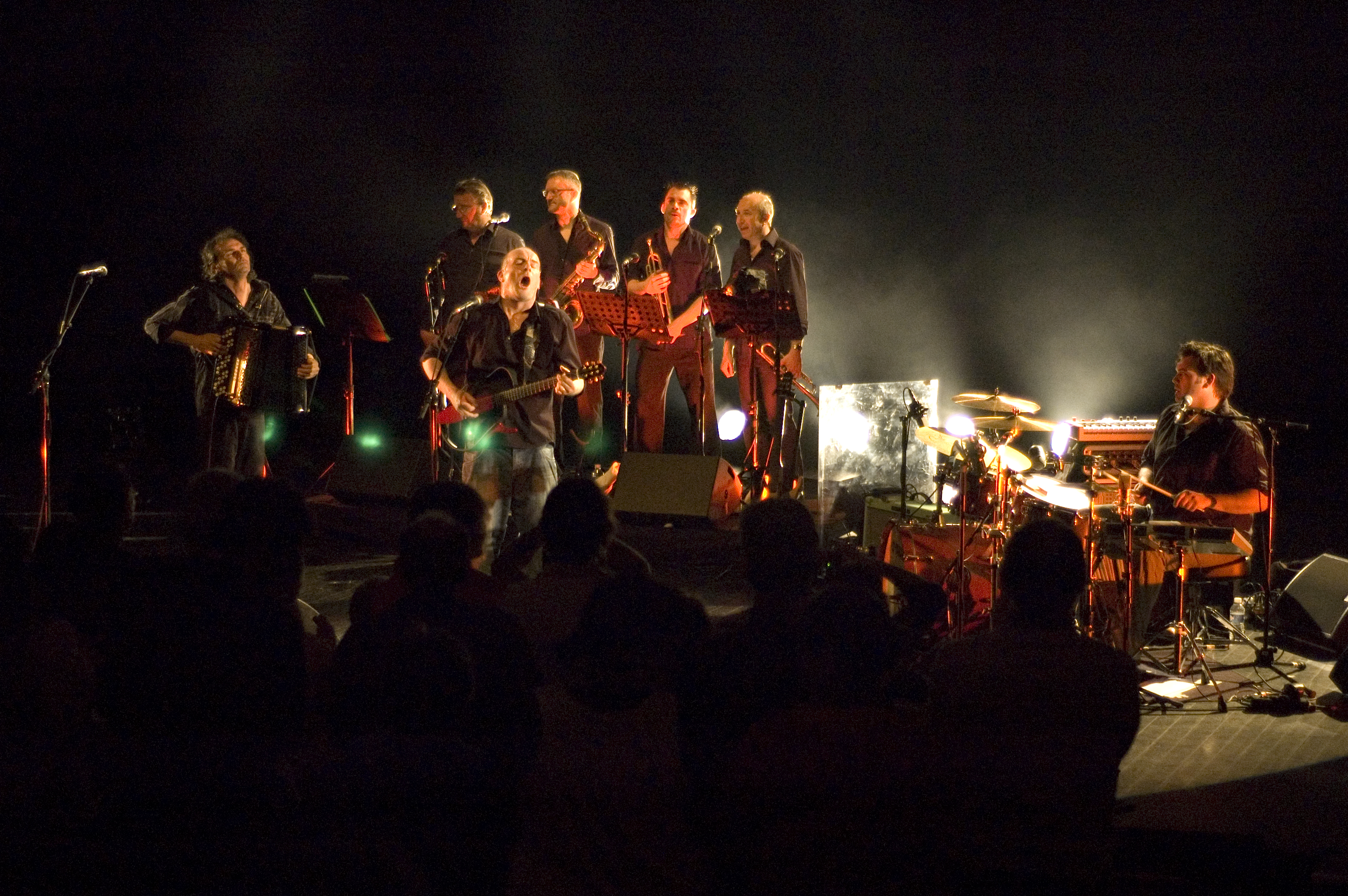
Red Cardell with the Michel Delage brass section – 2010

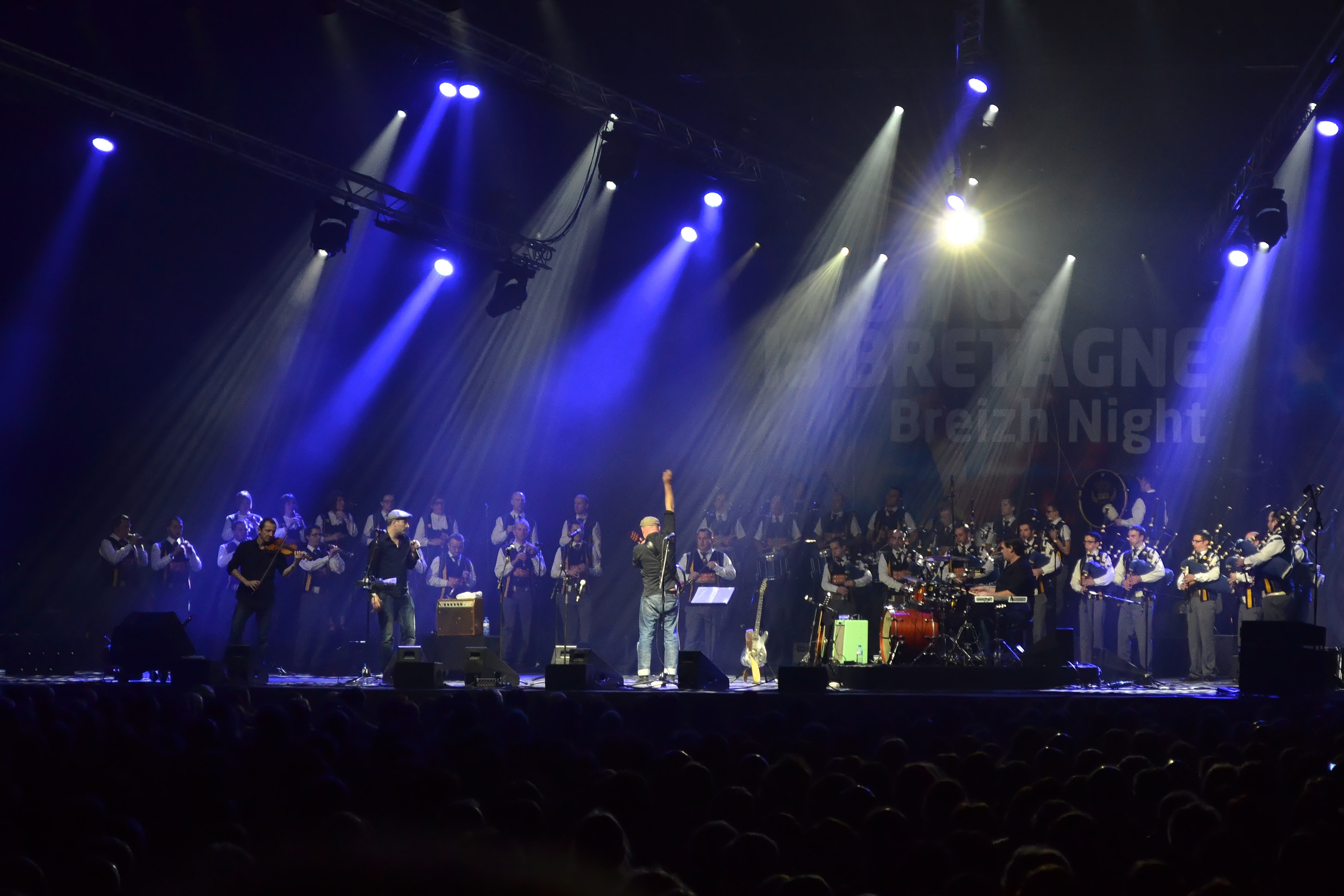
The Fest-Rock show with Bagad Kemper – 2014

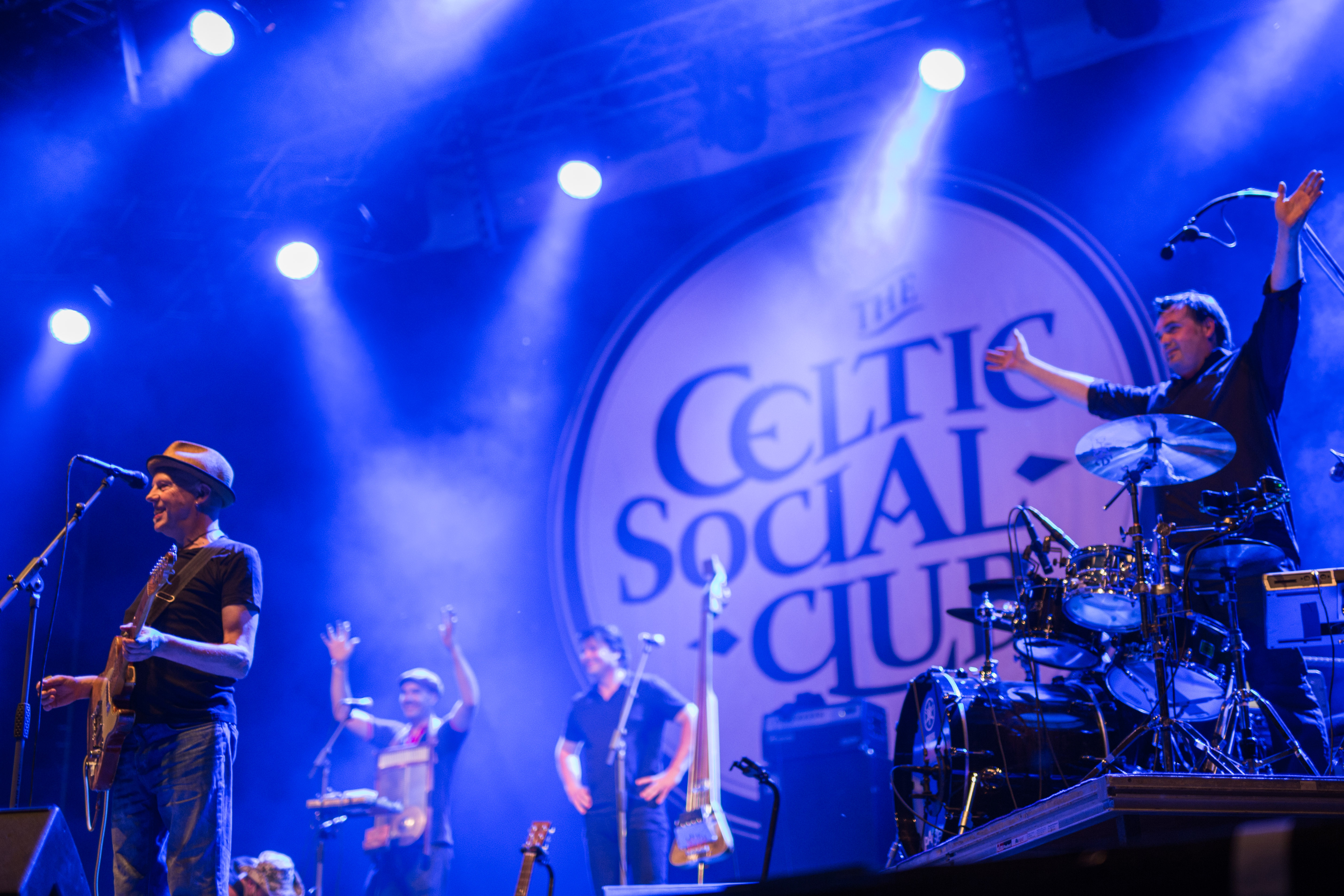
The Celtic Social Club – Rudolstad 2015

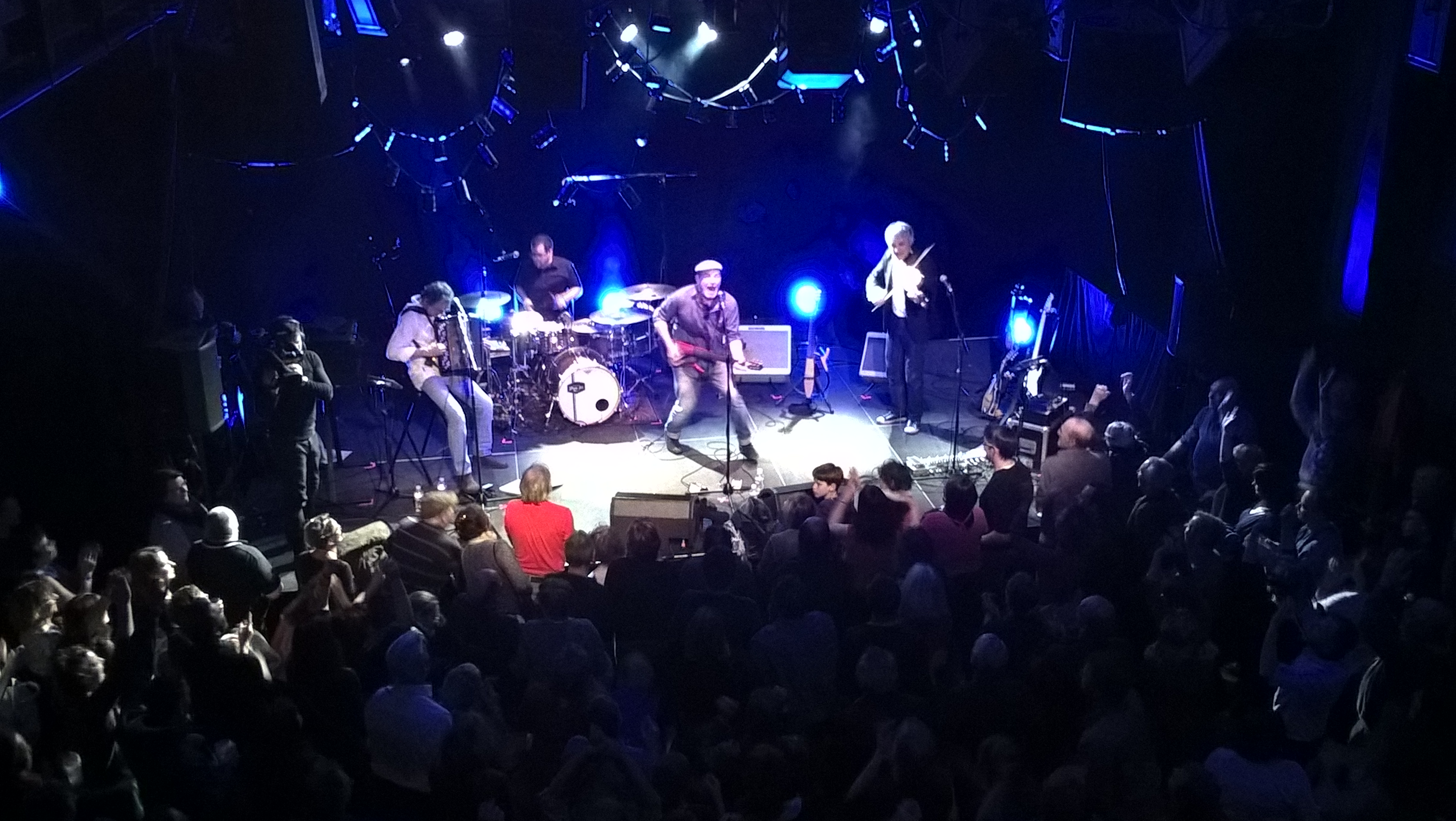
The new Red Cardell – 2016

Unclassifiable, their music is mainly a mix of Breton music and also of Slavic, Latin or Berber music with blues, rock, folk, punk and French realistic song and even more recently cheered up with electro and hip hop elements. The lyrics are inspired by the style of writing of poets and authors like Jacques Brel, Léo Ferré, Boris Vian and Jacques Prévert. It is these rich influences that follow the specific Jean-Pierre Riou poetic, turn to melancholy. They define themselves as a popular music band open to the world.

Besides their collaboration with French, Breton, Berber and Ukrainian musicians, they also have performed with British or American musicians, either on records or live. These artists include: Jimme O'Neill (The Silencers), Dr Das(Asian Dub Foundation), Dave Pegg (Fairport Convention, Jethro Tull), Tanya Morgan, I.C. Will, Juan Sebastian Larobina and Winston McAnuff.

As an independent rock band from their beginnings, Red Cardell released their first album Rouge in 1993, followed by a nonstop tour for several years, sharing the stage with Doctor Feelgood, The Fleshtones, Noir Désir and La Mano Negra Manu Chao orchestra.

In 1999, hundreds of concerts and three albums later, the new tracks of Rock'n roll Comédie are recorded in Belgium with former Black Sabbath producer/engineer Mike Butcher at the helm, also known for his work with Marvin Gaye.

In the period of the three albums Naître (Be Born, 2006), Le Banquet de cristal (The Crystal Banquet, 2008) and La Fête au Village (The Party in the Village, 2009) Red Cardell recorded and performed on stage with many guests including Dan Ar Braz, Miossec, Yann Tiersen or Thomas Fersen. Along with Oleg Skripka (singer of Vopli Vidopliassova and icon of the Orange Revolution) and Gourtopravci, a female traditional vocal choir, they regularly travelled across Ukraine for concert tours from Kharkiv to Donetsk, Lviv or Yalta and several times in Kyiv with two exceptional performances for Kraina Mriy festival, in front of tens of thousands of spectators at Maidan independence square.

In 2010, their album Soleil Blanc ("White sun") is recorded and mixed by the English producer Clive Martin (who has worked with famous artists such as Queen, Sting, David Byrne) and co-produced by the French musician Stéfane Mellino, singer and guitarist of Les Négresses Vertes. On this album which shows a more folk and blues trend and also flirts with Zydeco, Rockabilly or Charleston, the band is supported by the Michel Delage brass section. The song Comme une pierre qui roule is a tribute to Bob Dylan's Like a Rolling Stone and the song Robert Johnson to the American blues singer and guitarist.

In Spring 2012, their album Falling in love, recorded in France, was mixed in New York City by the American sound engineer Ariel Borujow (Black Eyed Peas, Madonna, Just Blaze) at Stadium Red studio in Harlem. The album was awarded as best progressive edge album of the Year by the Indie acoustic project (USA), in 2013.

In 2014, with the Fest-rock show, they represented Brittany alongside Bagad Kemper (the most-titled bagad of the Breton pipe bands national championship) for La Nuit de la Bretagne ("The Brittany Night") French tour, including a date at Bercy Arena in Paris. In April, they announced their participation as the new creation of the Festival des Vieilles Charrues (The biggest in France) for its 2014 edition : The Celtic Social Club, a supergroup of seven Breton musicians and others, which includes Jimme O'Neill (The Silencers), Ronan Le Bars (Héritage des Celtes) and the three members of Red Cardell. Within the new band they recorded their first album released in June. We also see Red Cardell in July on the other side of Pyrénées on the stage of the main Celtic festival of Spain in Ortigueira in Galicia and December 31 in Cyprus to end the year.

In February 2015, they began a French tour within The Celtic Social Club and also announced venues in Germany (TFF Rudolstadt), Switzerland (the Geneva Celebrations) and three gigs in New York City, invited by the association of Breton diaspora of Big Apple to celebrate the Feast of Saint-Yves, National Day of Brittany.

In early October 2015, Manu Masko announced his departure from Red Cardell. A few days later Jean-Pierre Riou precisely continue the adventure and announces a new album for March 2016 co-authored with Jean-Michel Moal.

Jean-Pierre Riou and Jean-Michel Moal, co-founders of the group in 1992, meet again after four years of separation. They are accompanied for this new formation by multi-instrumentalist Pierre Sangra (Thomas Fersen), a partner since the album Naître in 2006, and drummer Hibu Corbel (Robin Foster, Alexis HK).

== Current members ==
- Jean-Pierre Riou (lead vocals, guitars, mandolin, banjo, bombards, harmonica) (1992–present)
- Jean-Michel Moal (accordion) (1992–2011 / 2015–present)
- Pierre Sangra (fiddle, guitars, mandolin, banjo and backing vocals) (2015–present)
- Hibu Corbel (drums, percussions, samples and backing vocals) (2015–present)
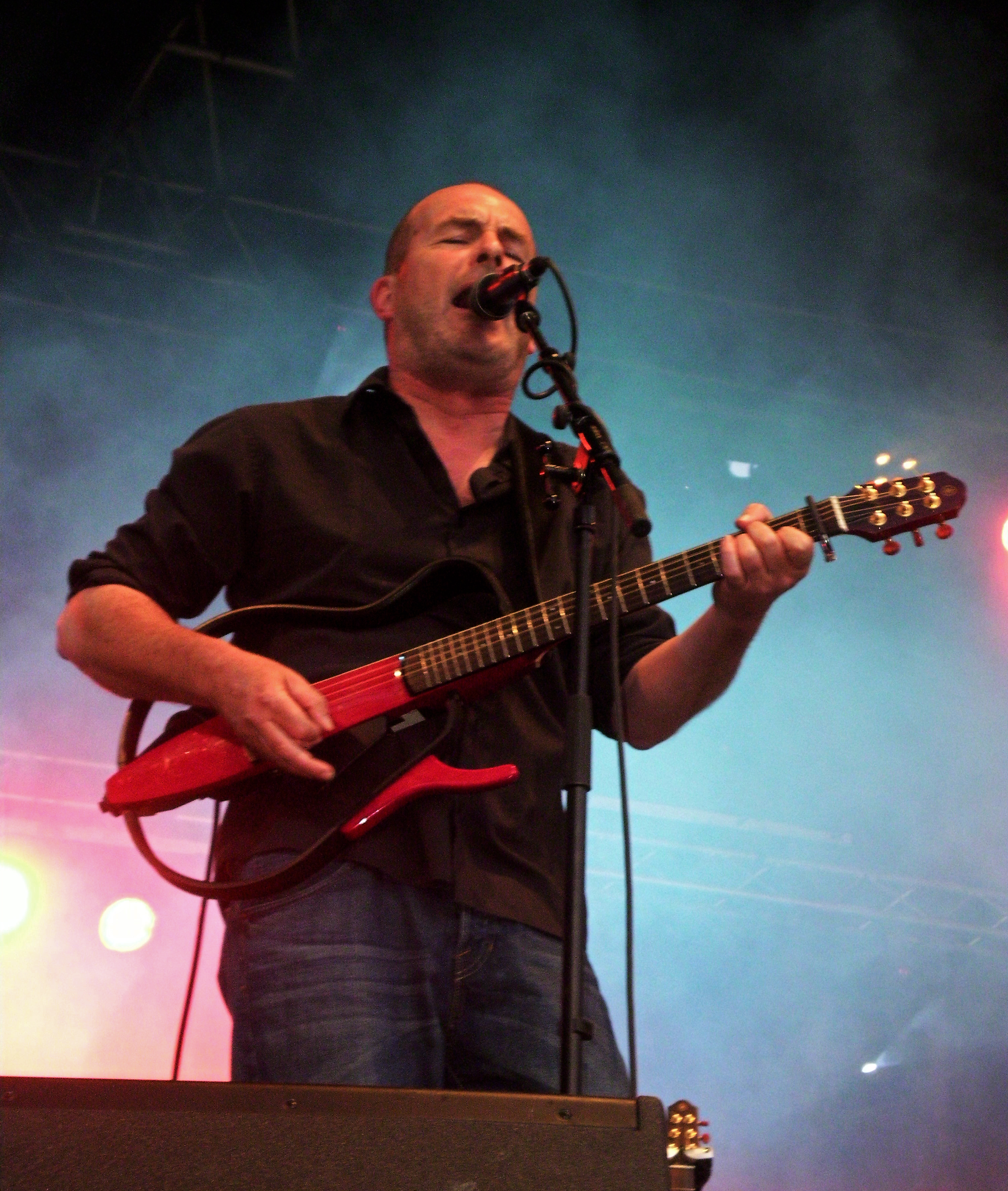
Jean-Pierre Riou

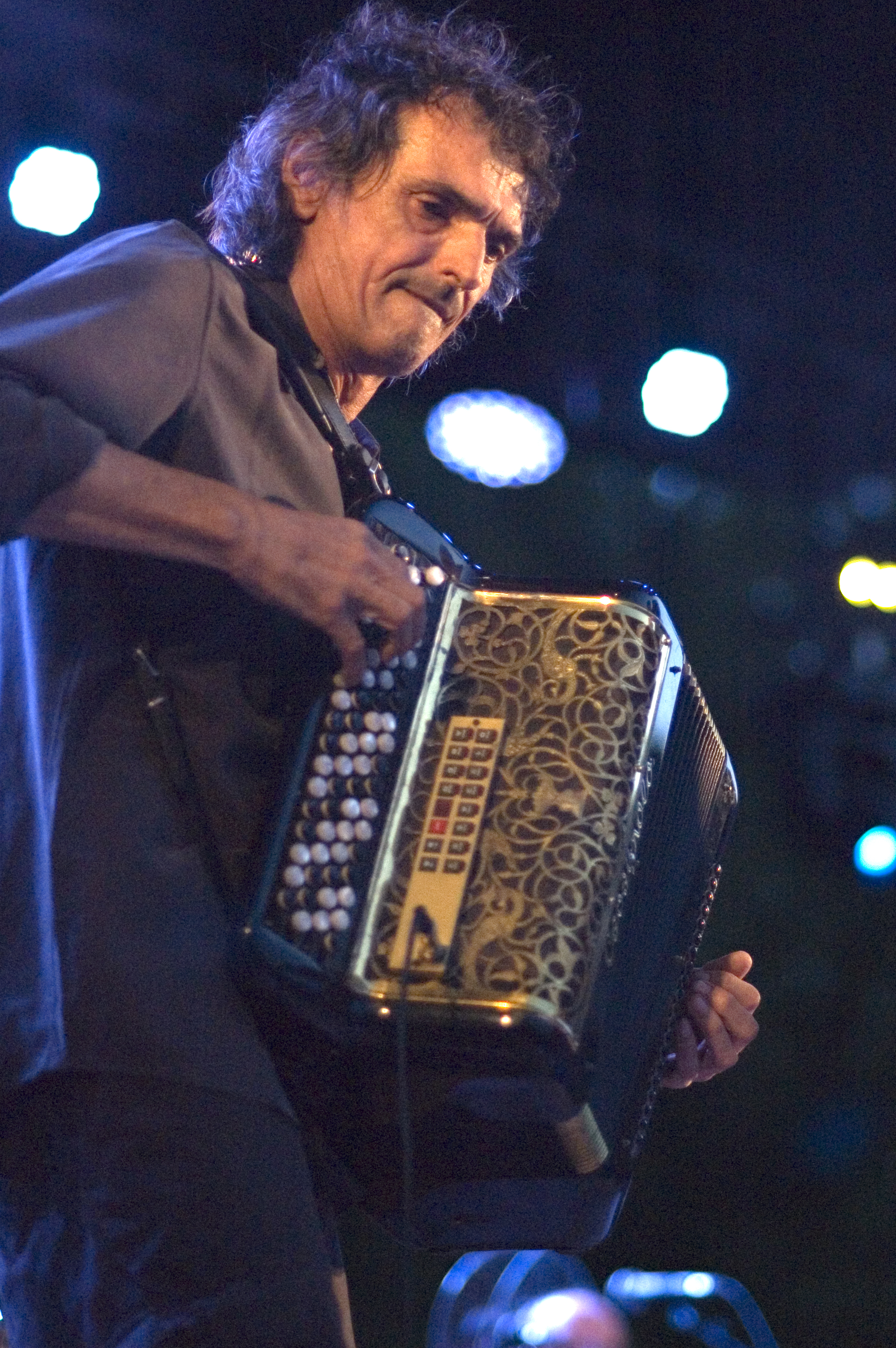
Jean-Michel Moal

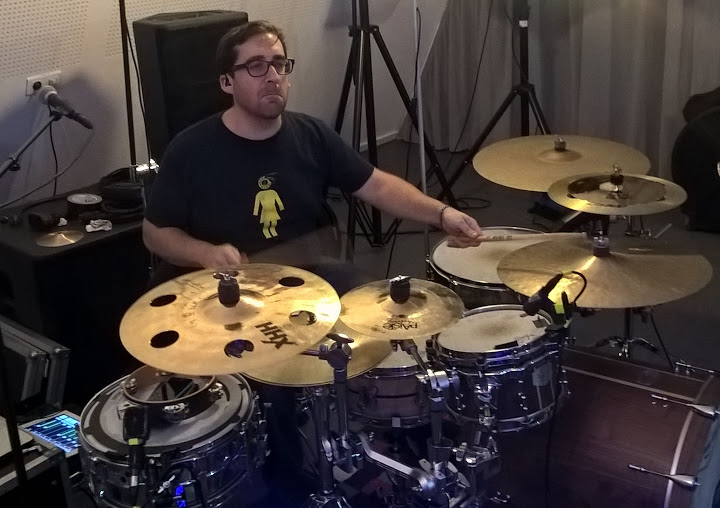
Hibu Corbel

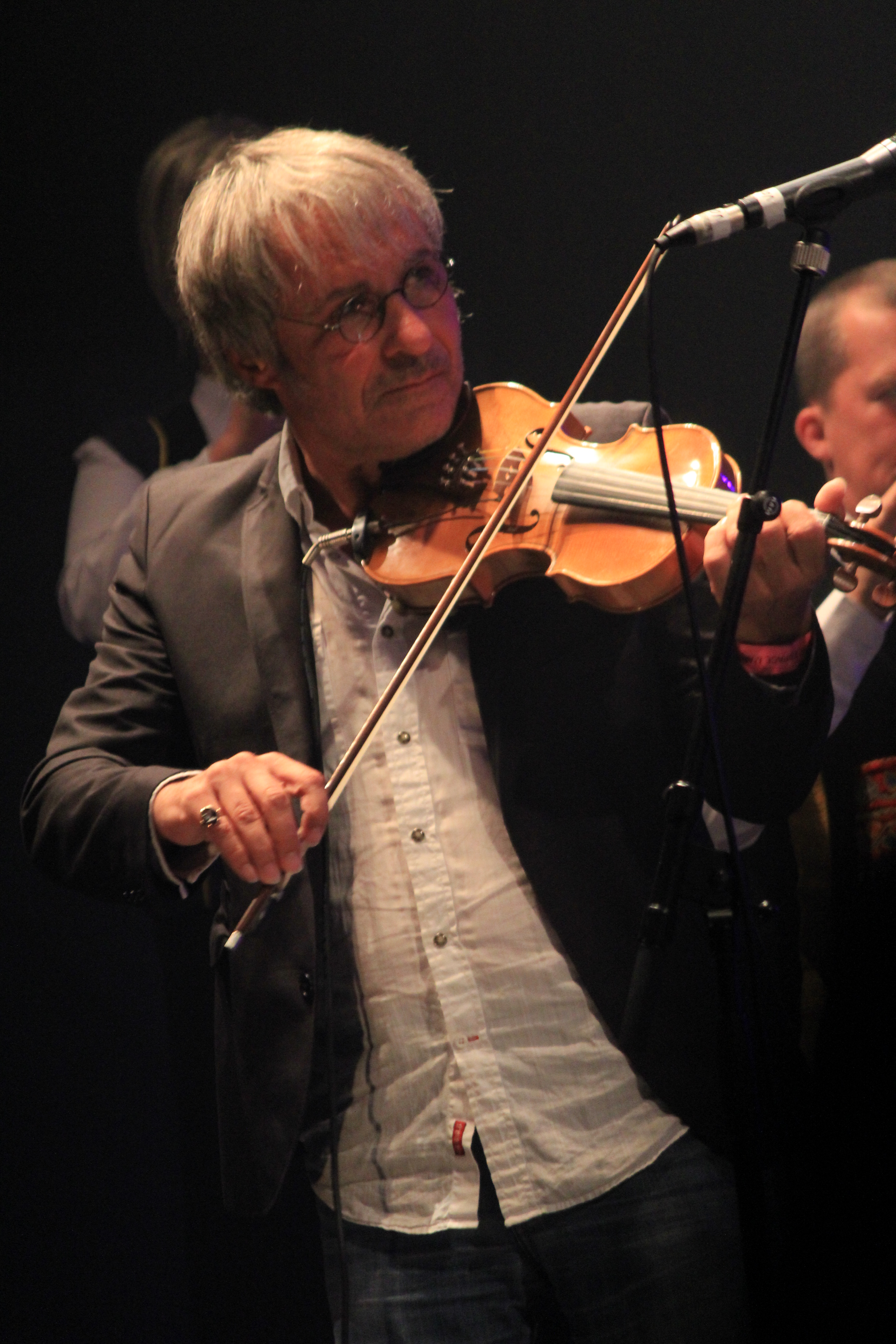
Pierre Sangra

== Additional members on stage ==
- Pierre Stéphan (fiddle) (2011–2015)
- Ronan le Bars (great Highland bagpipe, Uilleann pipes, tin and low whistle) (2012–2015)

== Former members ==
- Manu Masko (drums, percussions, Keyboards, Samples, loops and backing vocals) (2001–2015)
- Mathieu Péquériau (harmonica, washboard, percussions, and backing vocals) (2011–2015)
- Ian Proërer (drums) (1992–2001)
- Patrick Goyat (bass) (1992–1994)
- Christophe Poignant (bass) (1992)
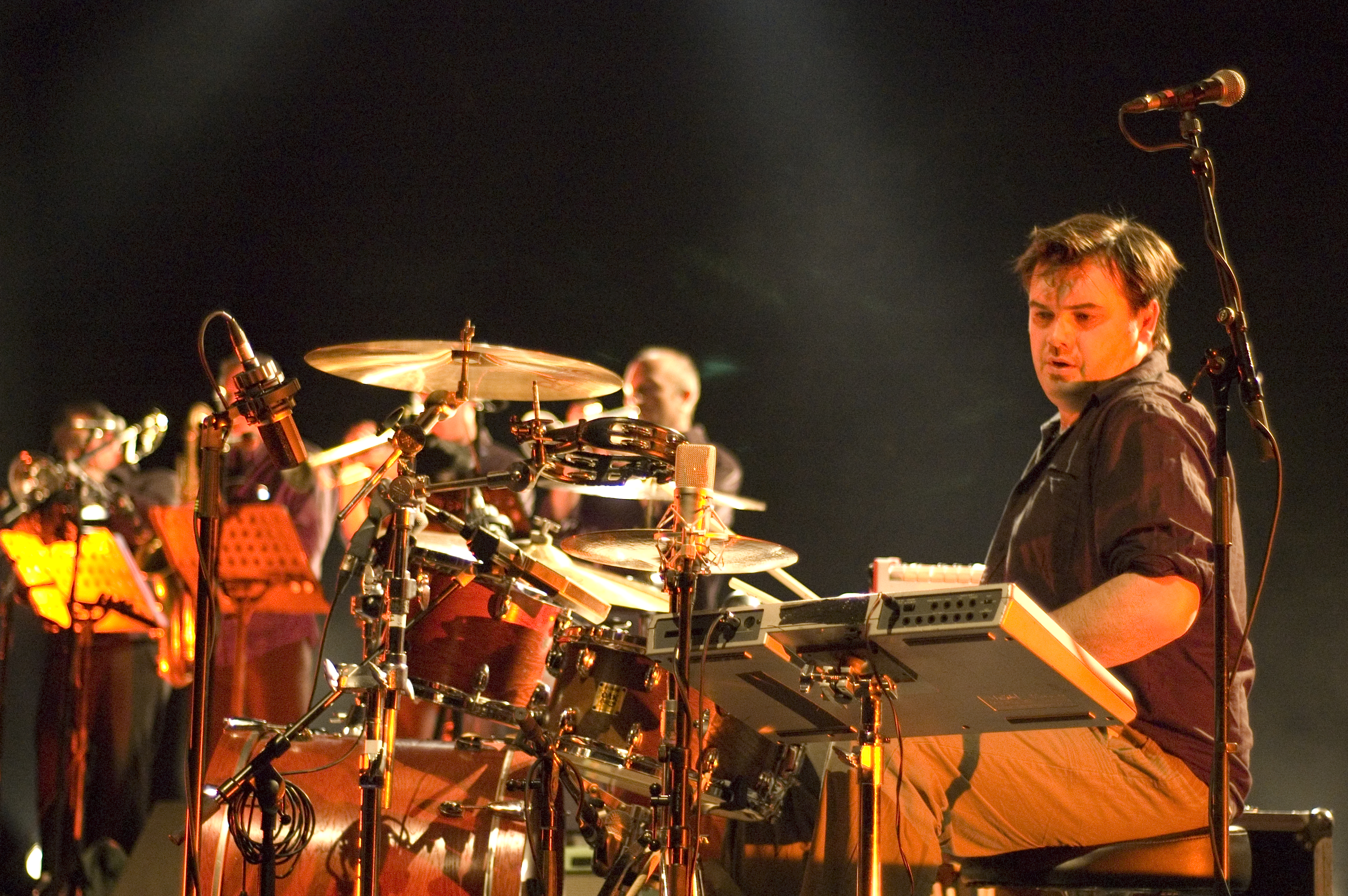
Manu Masko

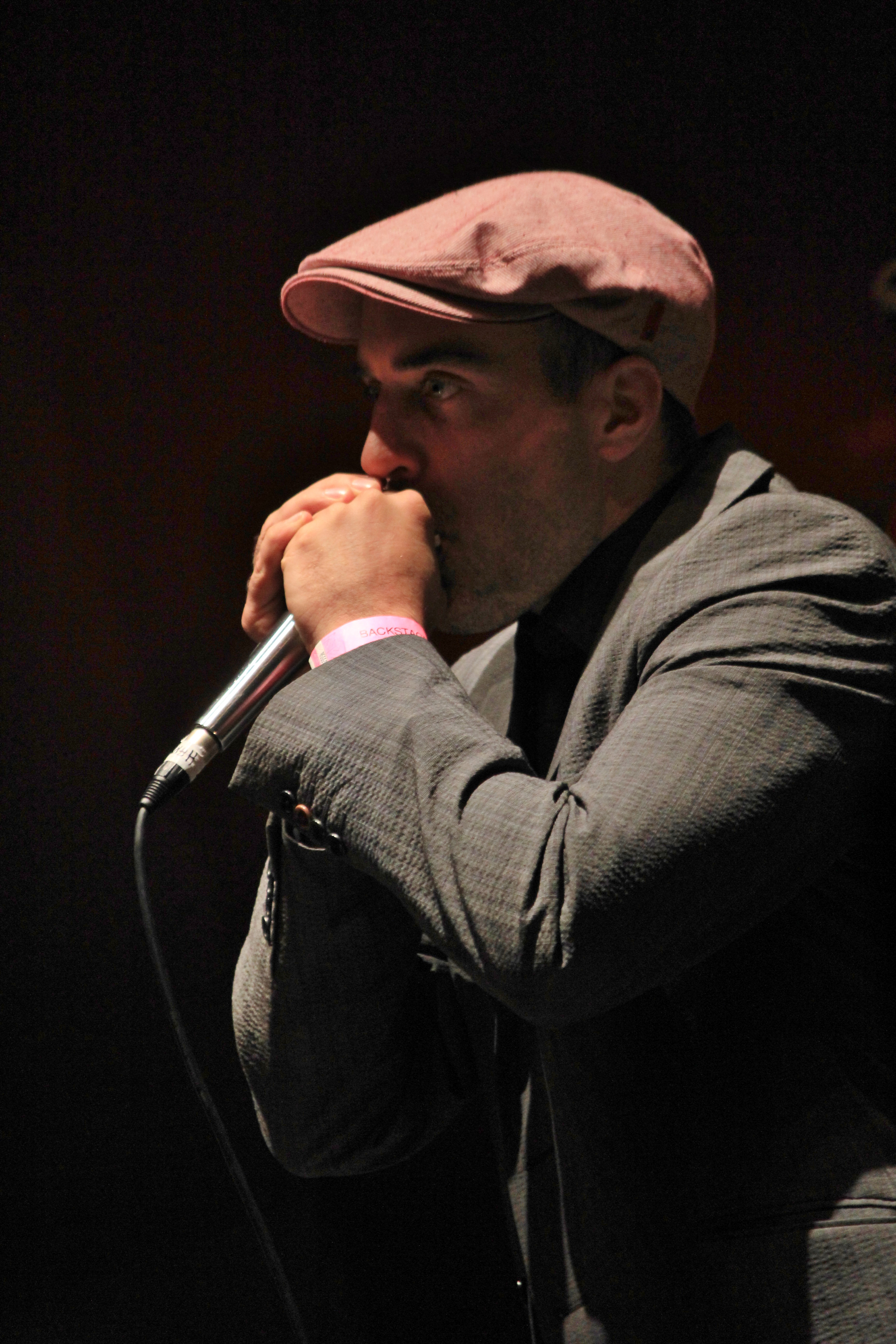
Mathieu Péquériau

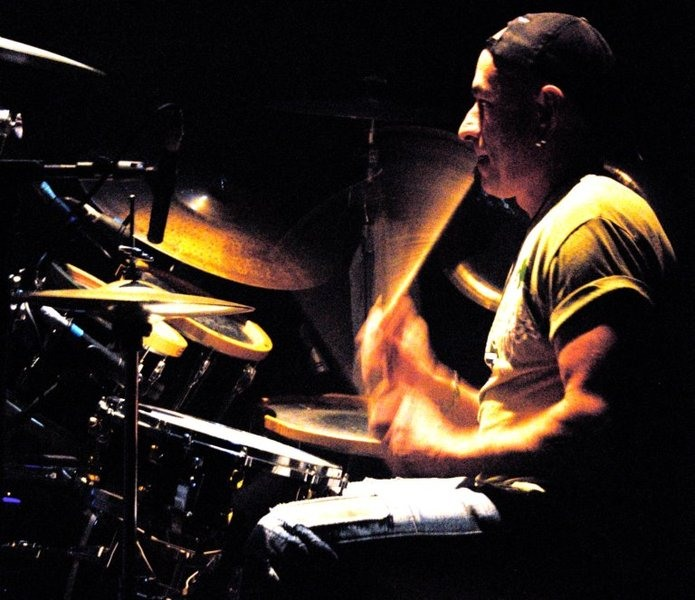
Ian Proërer

== Discography ==
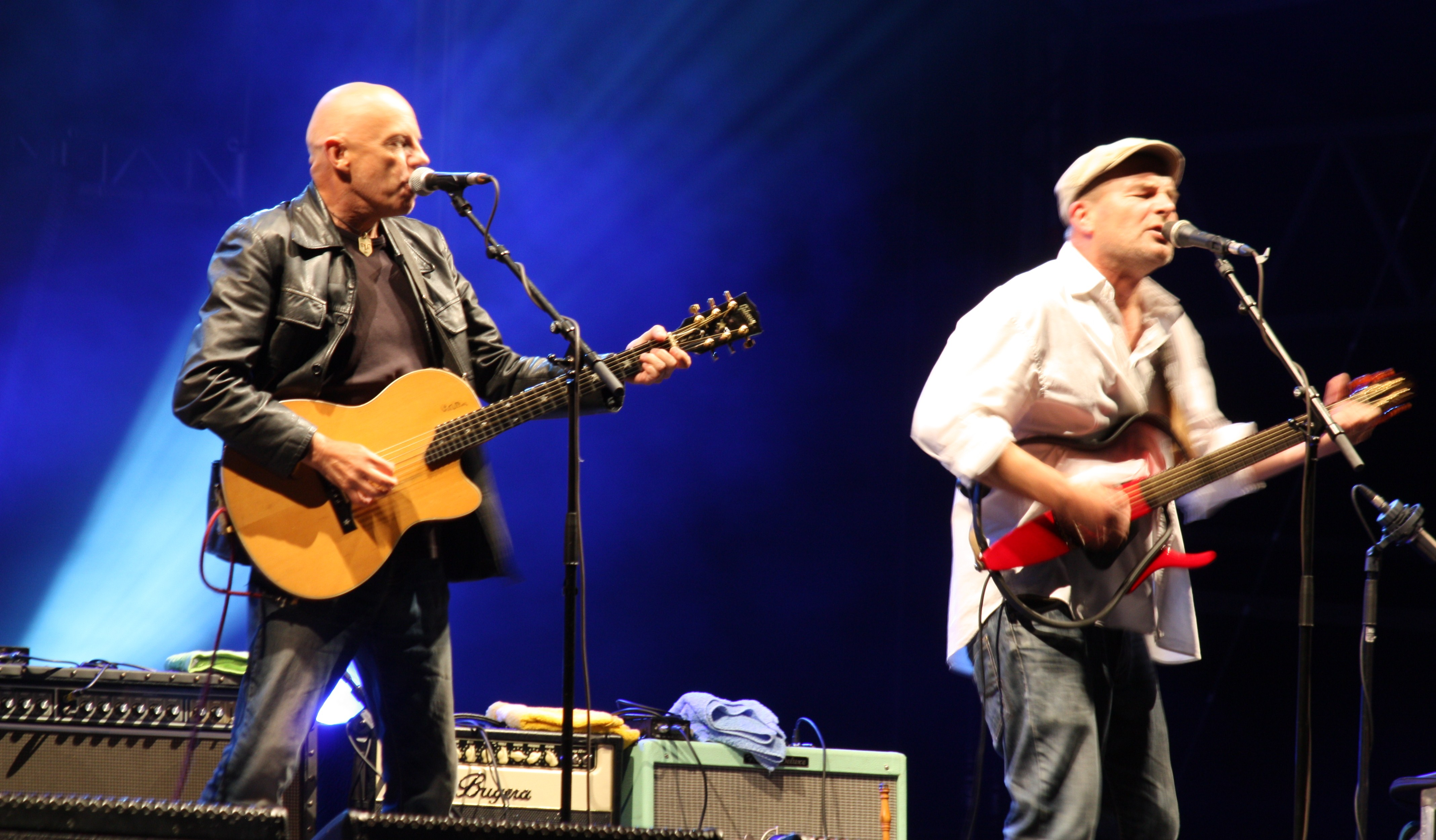
Jimme O'Neill and Jean-Pierre Riou

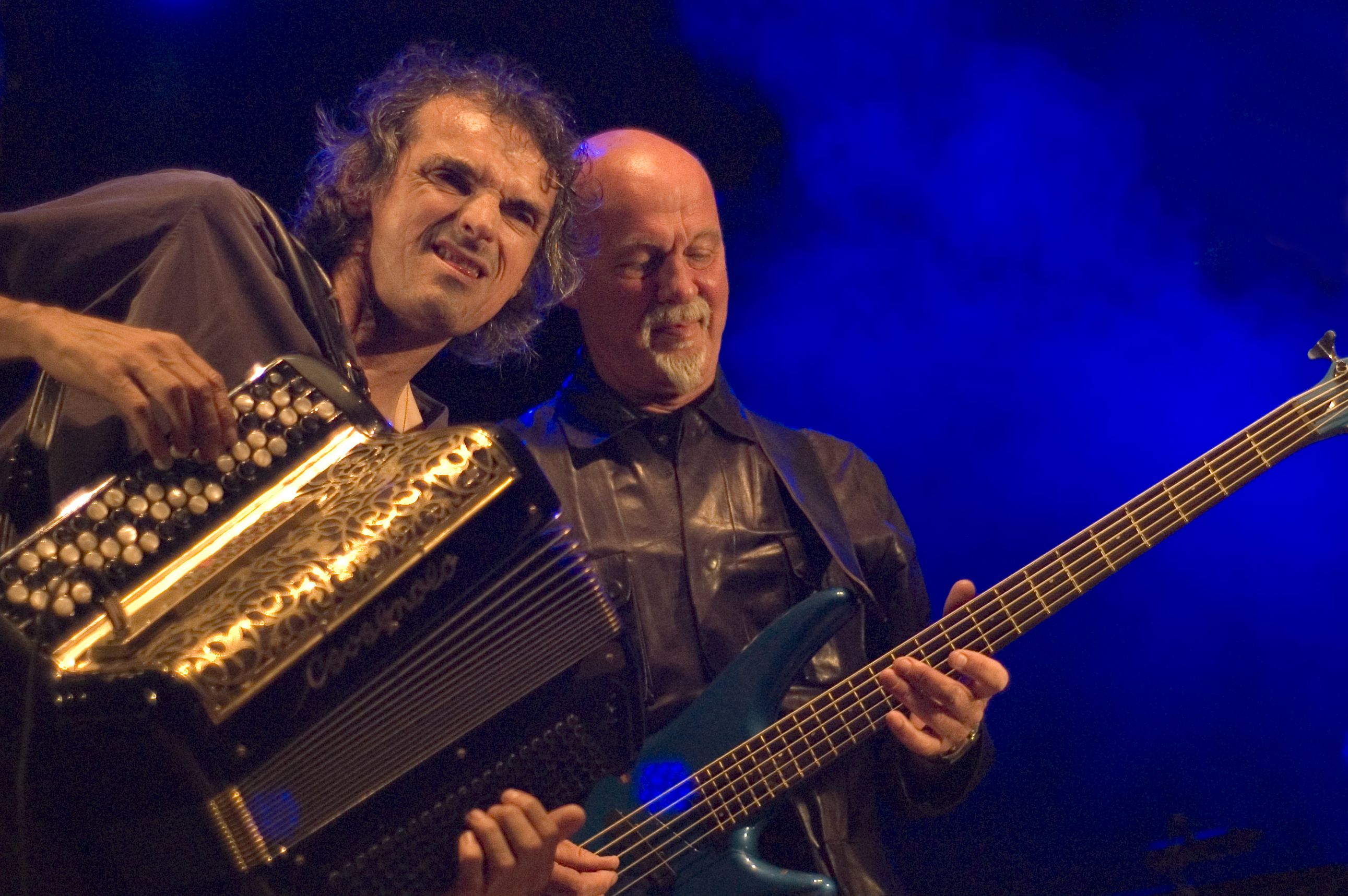
Jean-Michel Moal et Dave Pegg

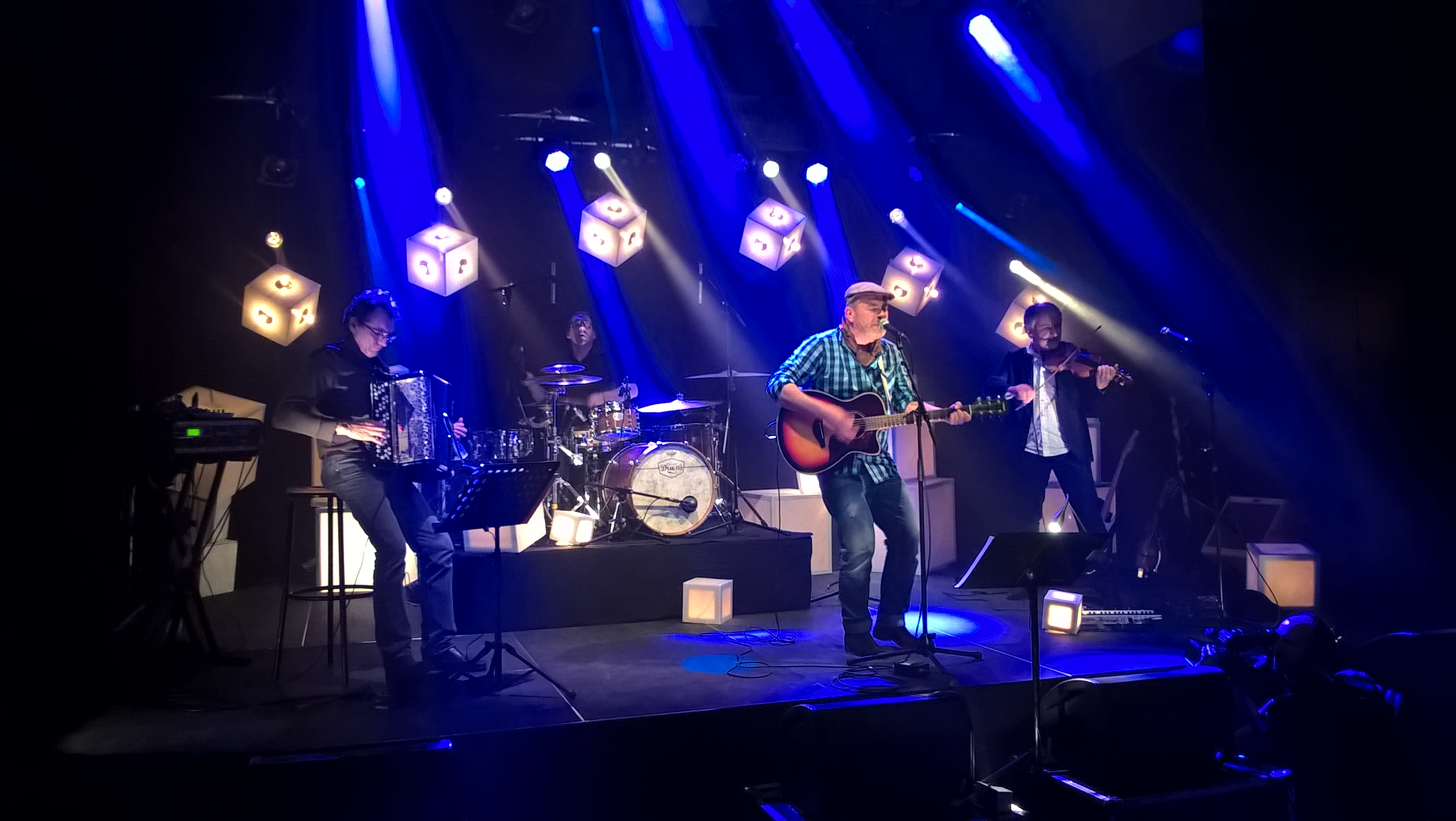
Red Cardell 2016

- Discography of Red Cardell on Wikipedia in French

Year	Title	Notes
1993	Rouge	Studio
1996	Douleur	Studio
1997	3	Studio
2000	Rock'n'roll Comédie	Studio
2002	La Scène	Live performance
2003	Cardelectro	Experimental
2003	Sans fard	Studio
2004	Bal à l'Ouest	Live performance
2006	Naître	Studio
2008	Le Banquet de cristal	Best of with guests
2009	La Fête au village	Live performance with guests
2010	Soleil Blanc	Studio
2012	Falling in Love	Studio
2013	Running in Paris	Live performance
2013	Fest-Rock	Live performance with Bagad Kemper
2014	Gwenn-ha-du	Concept album with Bagad Kemper
2016	Un Monde tout à l'envers	Studio
2016	Bienvenue	concept album with 5 guests from 5 continents
2018	Courir	Studio
2019	Nerzh	Concept album with Bagad Kemper
2021	Climatik	Best of, unplugged live performance in studio

- Within The Celtic Social Club.

Year	Title	Notes
2014	The Celtic Social Club	Studio with guests
2015	Unplugged New York City	Live performance
