= McAnuff =

McAnuff is a surname. Notable people with the surname include:

- Des McAnuff (born 1952), American musical theatre director
- Jobi McAnuff (born 1981), English and Jamaican footballer
- Winston McAnuff (born 1957), Jamaican singer
