= Lycée Montaigne (Paris) =

French secondary school

Coordinates: 48°50′38″N 2°20′5″E

The Lycée Montaigne is a French public secondary school. It is located in the 6th arrondissement of Paris, near the Jardin du Luxembourg, and was founded in the 1880s. During World War II, the Nazis had a bunker built under the school.

The school currently has around 800 pupils at the Collège level, and 1,000 pupils at the Lycée level. The school also offers classes préparatoires for 150 pupils. The classes préparatoires are specialized in economics (ECE and ECS).

It also has international sections, in Portuguese, English, and Polish.

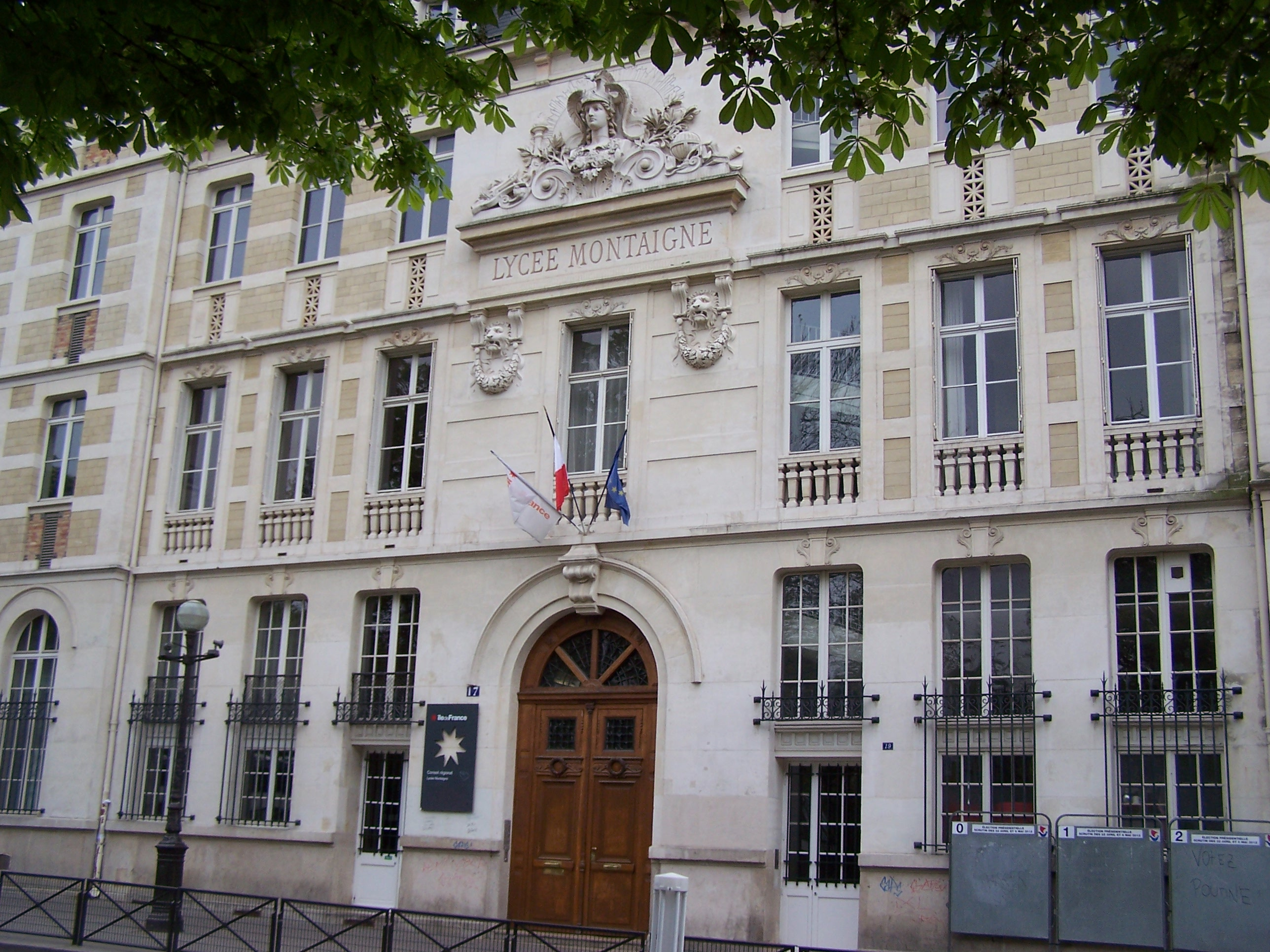
Lycée Montaigne

== Alumni ==
Famous alumni of the Lycée Montaigne include:

- Alexis Bossard, musician and drummer
- André Weinfeld, writer, director, producer
- Frédéric Beigbeder, writer
- Adèle Haenel, actress
- René Clair, filmmaker
- Michel Debré, former French Prime Minister
- Richard Descoings, director of the Paris Institute of Political Studies
- Karl Lagerfeld, fashion designer
- Régis Laspalès, comedian and actor
- Jean-Marie Lustiger, former archbishop of Paris
- Phetsarath, former Prime Minister of Laos
- Renaud, singer
- Wilfrid Sellars, philosopher

== See also ==
There is an unrelated Lycée Montaigne in Bordeaux, the website of which is http://montaigne.bordeaux.free.fr (in French).
