= R.wan =

- Also known as: R.wan / Sylvester Staline
- Born: Erwan Séguillon; 1974 (age 51–52); France
- Genres: Chanson, rap
- Occupations: Singer, songwriter
- Years active: 1998–present
- Label: Wagram Records
- Member of: Java; Soviet Suprem
- Website: www.r-wan.fr

Erwan Séguillon (French pronunciation: [seɡijɔ̃]; born 1974), better known as R.wan (a derivative of his given name), is a French singer, songwriter and rapper.

== Beginnings ==
R.wan began his musical career in small reggae formations like Sense Lion and Mystik Vibes. In 1998, he met François-Xavier Bossard (known as Fixi), shifting to French chanson, rap and humour. He would eventually lead to the formation of the French band Java.

== Java ==
He was the lyricist, composer and lead singer for the group Java formed in 1997. In 2006 R.wan launched his solo career in addition to his work in Java to whom he contributed until 2010. The band also included François-Xavier Bossard (known as Fixi), Jérôme Boivin (known as Pépouseman) and Alexis Bossard (known as Bistrol Banto)

== Solo career ==
In 2006, R.wan launched a solo project with the album Radio Cortex with the drummer Alexis Bossard. The album included 14 songs and 5 jungles in collaboration with Arno Elbaz, K.mille, Climbié, Nicolas Kassilchik, Jérôme Paret, Camille Ballon, Fixi (of Java), Jérôme Van den Hole, and sound engineer Laurent Guénau. The album concept was emulating programming in a pirate radio, thus the jingles. It alternates between reggae, rap, ragga, électro, French chanson and parodies. In November and December 2010, he toured alongside Jamaican Winston McAnuff in collaboration with Fixi. He also appeared with Java, au Zénith of Nancy, and at Élysée Montmartre, Paris. The follow-up Radio Cortex 2 in 2008 was produced by K.1000 continuing mixing rap, electro and reggae influences.

His third solo album Peau rouge in 2012, was full of energy and humour but also included a tribute to the Armenian genocide in the track "Le papier d'Arménie". The fourth album Curling in 2017, including "Berbère", telling the story between a Breton and a Berber, with magic use of violin and Mediterranean music.

== Soviet Suprem ==
He also took part in the group Soviet Suprem where he was known as the eccentric "Sylvester Staline". The group takes Soviet-themed songs often mixed with Russian, Balkan, militaro-punk and electronic music.

The collective members are Erwan Séguillon (better known as R.wan from band Java) – known as the character "Sylvester Staline" in the formation and Tom Feterman (from the band La Caravane Passe) known in Soviet Supreme as the character "John Lénine". The band also includes the characters "DJ Croute Chef" and "Yougo Chavez".

Soviet Suprem released the albums L'Internationale in 2014 and Marx Attack in 2018 and the EP Bolchoï in 2014.

== Discography ==
=== Albums ===
with Java

- 2000: Hawaï
- 2001: Sur Seine (live)
- 2003: Safari croisière
- 2009: Maudits français

with Soviet Suprem

- 2014: L'Internationale
- 2018: Marx Attack

Solo

Year	Album	Peak positions
Year	Album	FR
2006	Radio Cortex	–
2008	Radio Cortex 2	169
2012	Peau Rouge	–
2017	Curling	–

=== EPs ===
with Soviet Suprem

- 2014: Bolchoï
- 2015: L'Internationale (EP bonus)

=== Singles ===
Year	Title	Peak positions	Album
Year	Title	FR	Album
2012	"Peau rouge"	–	
