= Jimme O'Neill =

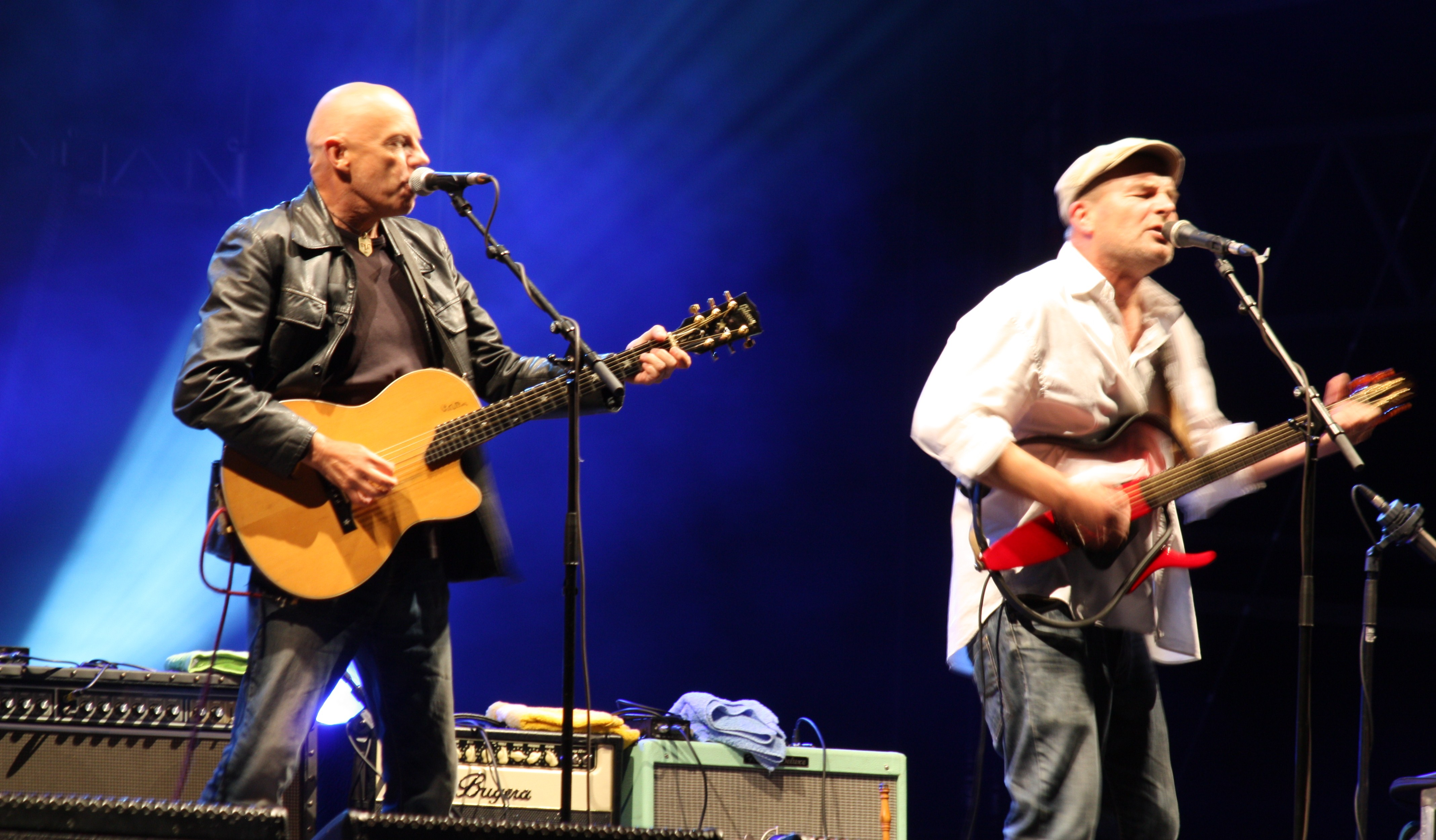
- O'Neill (left) performing with Red Cardell

Background information
- Born: James Hugh Vincent O'Neill; Coatbridge, Scotland
- Genres: Rock, pop, Celtic
- Instruments: Vocals, guitar, harmonica
- Years active: 1977–present
- Label: Celtic music
- Member of: The Silencers

Jimme O'Neill is a Scottish singer and guitarist who has been the lead singer of Scottish rock band The Silencers since 1984. Having started his musical career with Cha Burns in Fingerprintz in the new wave music scene, they joined Martin Hanlin and Joseph Donnelly in the 1980s to create the band The Silencers.

== Career ==
Born in Glasgow, Scotland with Irish roots, his first group, named Fingerprintz, recorded three albums from 1977 to 1981. A skilled composer, he has also written songs for artists such as Lene Lovich, Paul Young, Rachel Sweet and Manfred Mann.

Alongside The Silencers (the rock band he is the lead singer of), O'Neill released a solo album in 2008, entitled Real. He also sings in French.

In 2010, he formed a new group: The Honkytonk Hicks. A self-produced album was released in April 2011.

In 2015 he joined the collective The Celtic Social Club where he became the guitarist and lead singer alongside members of Red Cardell and Ronan Le Bars Group and guests as Winston McAnuff and Roy Harter.

== Personal life ==
He is also a painter and, being a multi-linguist, has lived in Rennes for some time.
