= Cha Burns =

- Born: Charles Burns; 20 March 1957; Coatbridge, Scotland
- Died: 26 March 2007 (aged 50) Prestatyn, Wales
- Genres: Punk rock New wave Alternative guitar pop
- Occupation: Musician
- Instrument: Guitar
- Years active: 1977–2000
- Labels: BMG (France), Permanent (Britain), RCA
- Formerly of: Fingerprintz, The Silencers, Adam and the Ants

Cha Burns (20 March 1957 – 26 March 2007) was the guitarist for Fingerprintz and the Scottish band, The Silencers and live guitarist for Adam Ant.

== Biography ==
Born Charles Burns, in Coatbridge, Lanarkshire, in 1957, Burns became a guitarist on the London punk and new wave scene of the mid 1970s. As well as forming Fingerprintz with fellow Coatbridge local Jimme O'Neill, Burns played guitar in Adam Ant's backing band during 1982–1984 together with Fingerprintz drummer Bogdan Wiczling. Fingerprintz were recognised in retrospect as influential, but failed to gain any real commercial success in the UK.

In 1985, Burns and Jimme O'Neill formed The Silencers, although Burns's health became an issue during the recording of the first album, after he suffered a brain hemorrhage. Burns was back in the studio recording six weeks later despite the fact that he was still re-learning how to read. The Silencers received critical comparisons to Simple Minds and U2. A high point for the band was a support slot on a Squeeze tour which culminated in a gig at Madison Square Garden in Manhattan. The Silencers had a European hit with "Bulletproof Heart". However the single, written by O'Neill in the Fingerprintz days and was about the Irish Troubles, did not receive much airplay in UK.

During the late 1980s, The Silencers opened for David Bowie and U2 as well as touring for 4 months with Simple Minds. Despite modest success in the UK, The Silencers had an almost fanatical following in mainland Europe, especially France and Spain. In more recent years the band were best known for supplying the theme music of a popular advertising campaign for VisitScotland. Burns was once described by fellow band member Jimme O'Neill as "a dark, smouldering presence, rocking slowly back and forwards on his heels, caressing jagged, bittersweet melodies from his black Les Paul."

After five albums, Burns left The Silencers in 2000, rarely playing on-stage again. After two years in Switzerland Burns moved to Wales. He was diagnosed with lung cancer in late 2006 and had unsuccessful courses of treatment. Reportedly a keen environmentalist whose motto was "Planet Before Profit", he was keen to try metabolic therapy, a controversial alternative treatment not available on the NHS, which uses natural methods including diet to boost the immune system.

Ex-bandmate Jinky Gilmour aka JJ Gilmour organised a benefit concert for Burns at the ABC in Glasgow in February. Despite Burns's claiming he was the "forgotten man of Scottish rock", the 1,500 capacity venue sold out. The date was planned six weeks after his last course of chemotherapy. On that night Burns had regained enough strength to play with original band members and those from subsequent line-ups.

== Death ==
Burns died from lung cancer on 26 March 2007, aged 50, in Wales.

Preceded by Marco Pirroni	Adam Ant lead guitarist 1982 - 1984	Succeeded by Marco Pirroni
