= Bagad Kemper =

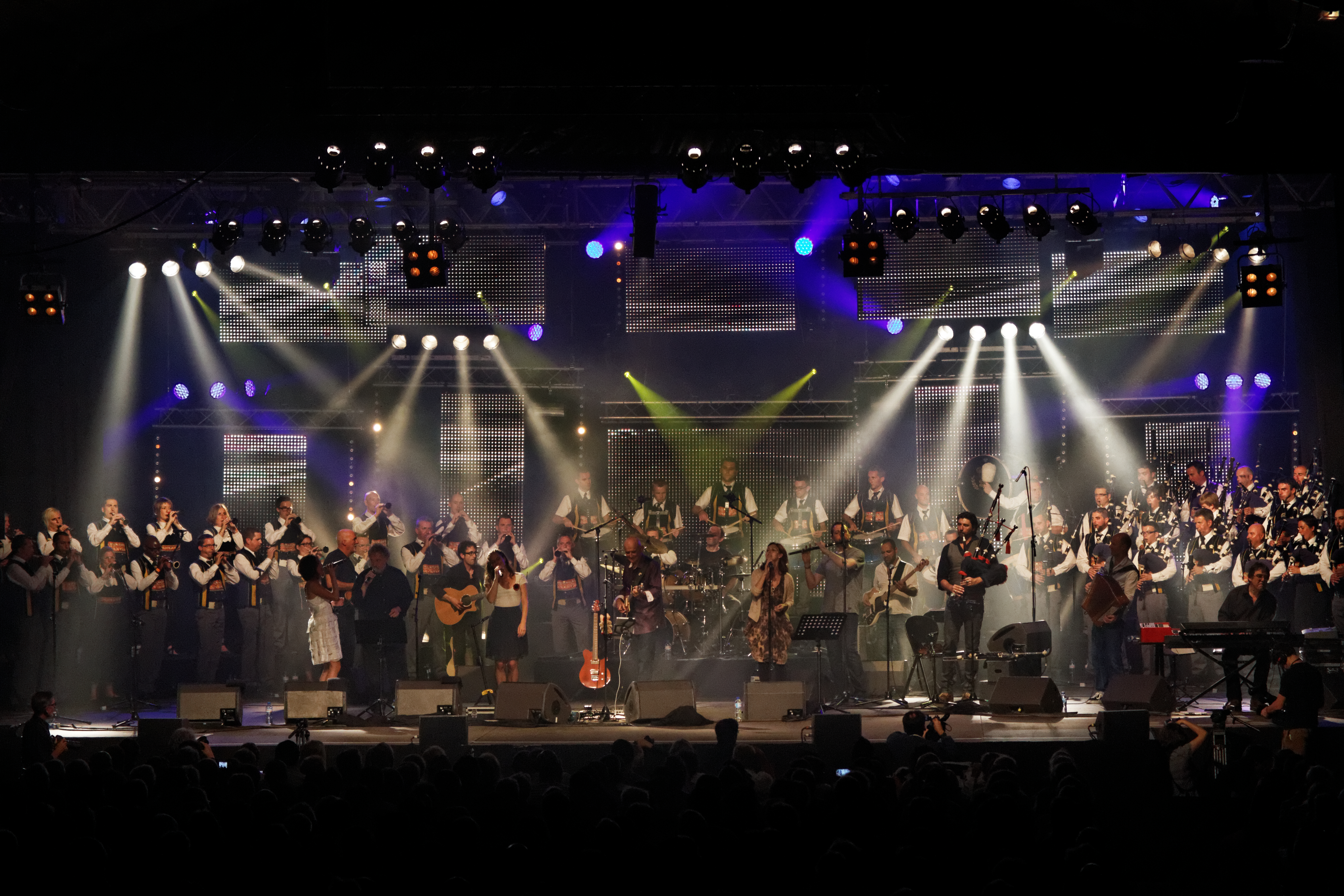
The Bagad Kemper with Dan Ar Braz for the Heritage des Celtes anniversary in Quimper.

Bagad Kemper (using the Breton name for the town of Quimper) is one of the oldest bagad, Breton pipe bands. Formed in 1949, its first president was none other than Loeiz Ropars, renovator of the Fest Noz (dance party) and kan ha diskan singer (Breton traditional vocal dancing). This ensemble holds the record for the most national Championship title wins.

Over time, this bagad has gradually reoriented itself toward collaborations with musicians from other traditions, like the Galician Susana Seivane and Carlos Núñez or South-African Johnny Clegg. Bagad Kemper were also a main feature of the very successful Heritage des Celtes (Heritage of the Celts) series of concerts, which brought together musicians from all horizons of the Celtic world. They celebrated their 60th anniversary with Breizh Balkanik, a show blending Balkan and Breton music worlds, with the Breton singer Érik Marchand. Except Dan Ar Braz, the bagad also accompanied on stage the band Red Cardell.

== History ==
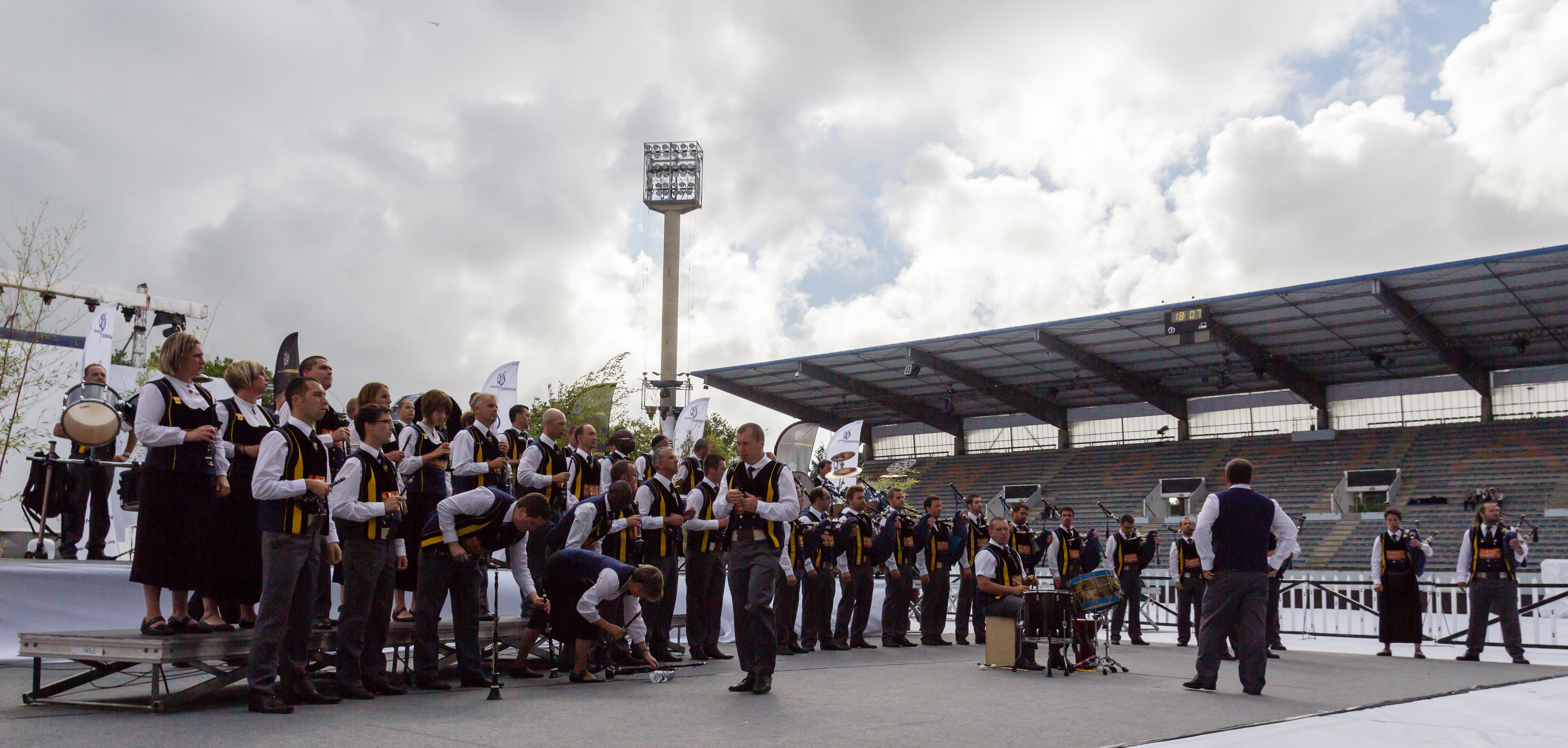
Bagad Kemper during the Bagadoù national championship in Lorient

== Discography ==
- Toniou war an Dachenn I (1976)
- Toniou war an Dachenn II (1979)
- Toniou war an Dachenn III (1984)
- Tonioù war an Dachenn IV (1989)
- The Best of (1992)
- Lip Ar Maout (1995)
- Hep Diskrog (1999)
- Azeliz Iza (2001)
- Sud Ar Su (2004)
- Collection 1995 - 2005 (2006)
- Best of Gwi@derien (2009)
- Live au Cornouaille (2010)
- Breizh Balkanik (2011)
- Fest-rock (2013) with Red Cardell
- Nerzh (2019) with Red Cardell
- KAS (2021)
