= JJ Gilmour =

- Birth name: James Gilmour
- Born: Glasgow, Scotland
- Origin: Coatbridge, Lanarkshire, Scotland
- Genres: Rock, folk
- Occupation: Singer-songwriter
- Years active: 1989–present
- Website: jjgilmour.co.uk

James "JJ" Gilmour is a Scottish singer-songwriter known as a member of the Glasgow-based rock band The Silencers.

Originally from Coatbridge in Scotland, Gilmour started his professional music career as a member of the Dundee-based band Joe Public. Two years later in 1989, he joined the mainstream music circuit by joining The Silencers, who were already enjoying success in Europe and touring with The Pretenders. After an invite by frontman Jimme O'Neill to join them, and making his debut on their album Dance to the Holy Man, Gilmour became a leading member of the band. Gilmour provided lead vocals for the band's song "I Can Feel It", from the album Seconds of Pleasure, which the band would perform as a live broadcast on Hogmanay 1994 from Stirling Castle.

After seven successful years with The Silencers, JJ Gilmour left the band in order to pursue a solo career. He briefly would become the frontman of British boyband East 17 for a few months in 1996.

In 2002, he released a solo album titled Sunnyside (P.A.L), and in 2012, he released an album titled Slocomotion.

For some time, he resided in Jersey, Channel Islands.
