= Martin Hanlin =

Scottish musician, manager and radio presenter

- Born: September 1959 (age 66); Glasgow, Scotland
- Occupations: Musician, manager and radio presenter

Martin Hanlin (born September 1959 in Glasgow) is a Scottish musician, manager and radio presenter. Hanlin was part of The Silencers (band). Hanlin is currently the host of The Real McCoy Radio Show on KXRN-LP.

== Notable interviews on The Real McCoy Radio Show ==
- Jim Kerr of Simple MindsJim Kerr interview on The Real McCoy Radio Show with Martin Stuart Hanlin
- Paul Buchanan of The Blue Nile Paul Buchanan interview on The Real McCoy Radio Show with Martin Stuart Hanlin
- Mike Peters of The Alarm Mike Peters interview on The Real McCoy Radio Show with Martin Stuart Hanlin
