= The Silencers (band) =

Scottish rock band

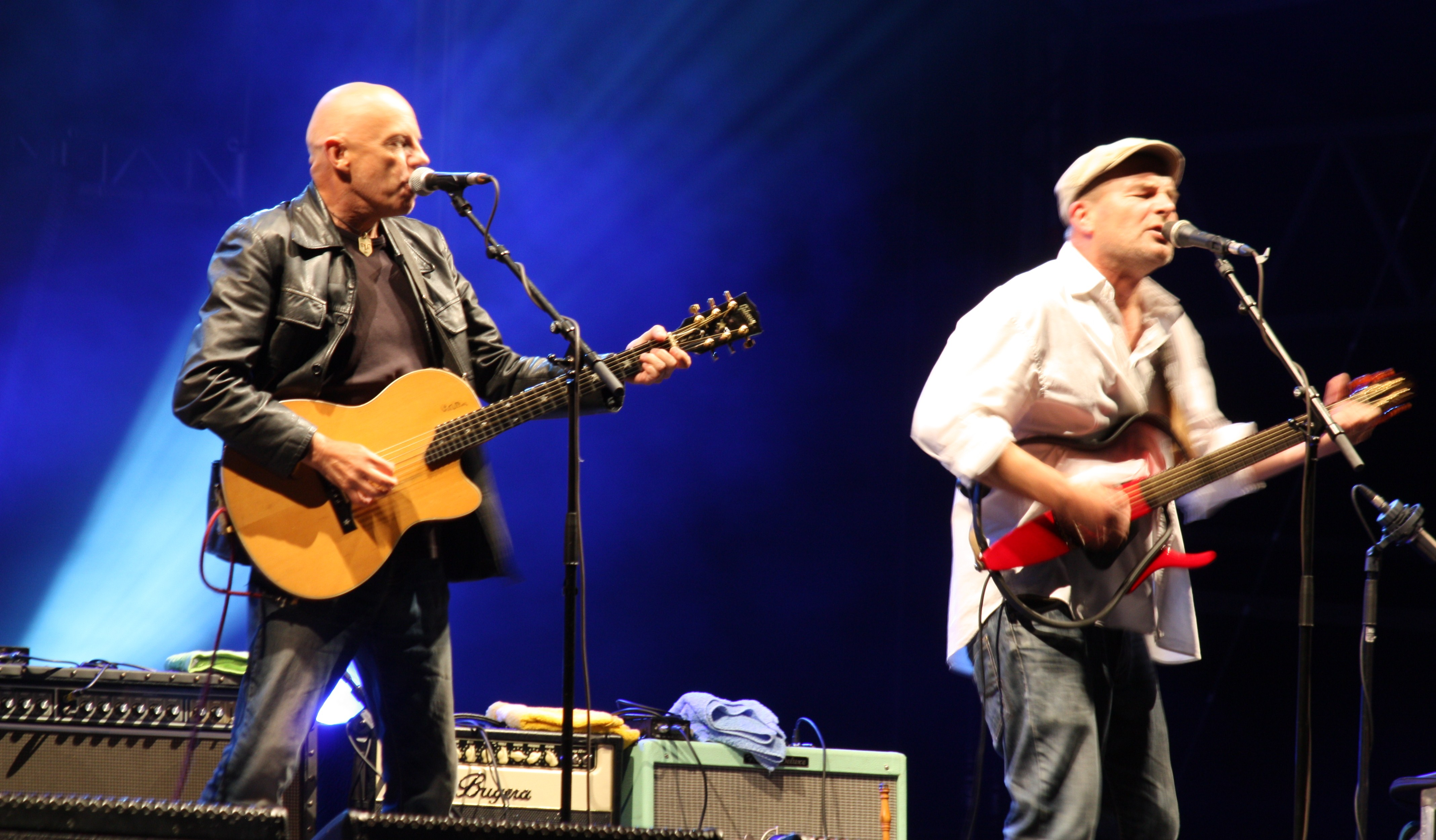
- The Silencers performing with Red Cardell

Background information
- Origin: Scotland
- Genres: Rock, pop, Celtic rock
- Years active: 1987–present
- Label: RCA Records
- Members: Jimme O'Neill (vocals/guitar); Aura O'Neill (vocals); James O'Neill (vocals/guitar); Conor O'Neill (guitar); Stephen Greer (bass); Baptiste Brondy (drums)
- Past members: Cha Burns †; Martin Hanlin; Joseph Donnelly; Lewis Rankine; JJ Gilmour; Jim McDermott; Phil Kane; Stevie Kane; Tony Soave

The Silencers are a Scottish rock band formed in London in 1986 by Jimme O'Neill and Cha Burns, two ex-members of the post-punk outfit Fingerprintz. Their music is characterised by a melodic blend of pop, folk and traditional Celtic influences. Often compared to Scottish bands with a similar sound like Big Country, Del Amitri and The Proclaimers, The Silencers have distinguished themselves with their eclectic sounds, prolific output and continued career. Their first single, "Painted Moon," was a minor international hit and invited critical comparisons to Simple Minds and U2.

In 1987 they released their first album A Letter From St. Paul, which included "Painted Moon" and another minor hit, "I See Red." Buoyed by the huge European hit "Bulletproof Heart", the band's third album Dance to the Holy Man is the band's commercial peak to date. Throughout the 1990s, The Silencers saw a popular taste shift away from their songwriter-based style of music toward experimental styles influenced by line up changes and O'Neills desire to push the boundaries of where the music could go with a heavier rock edge and the use of new technology.

== History ==
Before forming The Silencers, vocalist Jimme O'Neill and guitarist Cha Burns were active in London's new wave music scene. O'Neill wrote songs for Paul Young and Lene Lovich, while Burns played guitar in Adam Ant's backing band during 1982–1984, together with Fingerprintz drummer Bogdan Wiczling. O'Neill, who, in the mid 1970s, had worked for a time as a clerical assistant in the Department of Health and Social Security, released a single for Oval Records in 1975, "Achin' in My Heart"/"Cold on Me", under the name Jimme Shelter (a throwback to the song, "Gimme Shelter" by The Rolling Stones).

=== 1980s ===
In 1979, they met and formed a post-punk/new wave project called Fingerprintz, and released three albums under that name: The Very Dab, Distinguishing Marks and Beat Noir. They earned some critical recognition and notable appearances on John Peel's BBC Radio 1 show and the BBC's In Concert radio series. The group split in 1985. Then O'Neill formed a duo with electropop singer Jacqui Brookes and they released two singles in 1983: "Haunted Cocktails" and "Lost Without Your Love". When Brookes subsequently released solo album Sob Stories, O'Neill wrote or co-wrote a majority of the tracks and played guitar and other instruments on the album.

Soon O'Neill and Burns were playing music together again, this time joined by drummer Martin Hanlin and bass player Joseph Donnelly, a cousin of Simple Minds singer Jim Kerr. After considering band names like 'My Granny's Green Chair' and 'The Hot Dog From Hell', they settled on 'The Silencers'. In September 1986, they began to tour Europe and the United Kingdom. They demoed three new songs at Scarf Studios in London: "Painted Moon", "I See Red" and "I Can't Cry". The demos earned them a recording contract with RCA Records, and their song "Painted Moon", about O'Neill's personal reaction to the Falklands War, was included on the soundtrack to the film The Home Front, and then released as their first single in April 1987. Their first album A Letter from St. Paul included re-recorded versions of all three demos. The Pretenders invited the band to support them on their European tour, and then the success of Painted Moon across the pond induced a tour of the United States on their own, and later with Squeeze.

In 1988, The Silencers toured Europe with The Alarm and Painted Moon became a radio hit in the UK. The band moved back to Scotland and recorded a second album A Blues for Buddha at CaVa Studios in Glasgow, with Flood producing. The standout tracks were "Scottish Rain", about love and fallout from Chernobyl, and "The Real McCoy" which became a fan favourite. The band then toured Europe with Simple Minds for four months, culminating with a stadium show at Wembley in front of 80,000.

=== 1990s ===
After the tour, the band began work on third album Dance to the Holy Man, but personal conflict derailed the process. Donnelly and Hanlin left the band, and were replaced by Tony Soave on drums and Lewis Rankine on bass. The album, a departure from the band's "guitar-based atmosphere pop", was recorded during the summer of 1990. It included funk, blues, and Celtic strains. The O'Neill-penned "This Is Serious" had previously been submitted to other artists and had been recorded twice prior to The Silencers' version; in 1987 Eric Martin recorded it for his I'm Only Fooling Myself album, and one year later Marilyn Martin recorded it for her 1988 album, which took its name from the track. The single "Bulletproof Heart", a re-recording of a track from the Fingerprintz album Distinguishing Marks, and later to be covered by Jim Kerr for his Lostboy project. It became a hit in Spain and France, where the band had success at that time. The album sales lagged back in the United Kingdom, although it did enter the UK Top 40 chart, their first and last entry to date. JJ Gilmour joined the band as a second male vocalist before another tour of Europe, and Stevie Kane joined the band, replacing Rankine during the tour due to personality conflict.

Deeply in debt to RCA and not having the expected success in the UK, The Silencers were in danger of being dropped by their record label despite their success throughout Europe. However, after label representatives saw an impressive live show they allowed the band to begin work on fourth album Seconds of Pleasure. "I Can Feel It" was, true to form, a hit in Europe and ignored in the UK. Without tour support from RCA, the band financed its own tour to Switzerland, France and Scotland.

In 1994, The Silencers signed to new labels: Permanent for Britain and BMG for France. That summer they recorded a cover of the song "Wild Mountain Thyme", featuring O'Neill's daughter Aura on vocals. It became a hit in Scotland after featuring in a tourism board advertising campaign. Soon after, they completed fifth album So Be It.

After a mid-1996 tour of Europe, Gilmour and Soave left the band. Jim McDermott of the Kevin McDermott Orchestra joined on drums and Aura O'Neill became a permanent member of the band. The year 1996 brought the release of singles compilation Blood & Rain, and The Silencers took several years off from recording.

In 1999, the band worked on seventh album Receiving, which was financed by money from festival appearances in Europe. Speaking of the new record, O'Neill said, "Some of the new tracks were recorded as if this was a different band. I wanted to forget about everything we'd done before and some of what came out reminded me of Fingerprintz – new wave for the nineties!" The experimental nature of the songs, he said, was inspired by the influence of Jack Kerouac, William S. Burroughs and Charles Bukowski.

=== 2000s to 2010s ===
In 2001, the band released their first live album, A Night of Electric Silence, recorded in Glasgow in 2000 at The Old Fruitmarket, with McDermott on drums, Stevie Kane on bass, Phil Kane on keyboards, O'Neill on guitar and vocals, Milla on violin and Aura O'Neill on vocals.

In November 2004, Come was released, featuring the tracks "Siddharta", "Let It Happen" and "Head" with the title track featuring Aura O'Neill on lead vocal. O'Neill's son James O'Neill who had joined the band as lead guitarist in 1999 wrote "She Found Me" and the album sees a bridge between the heavier rock of "Receiving" and the more traditional celtic sound the band were known to exhibit live. In July 2006, Baptiste Brondy, a 20-year-old French drummer, replaced McDermott. Burns was six days past his 50th birthday when he died of lung cancer in the Welsh seaside resort of Prestatyn on 26 March 2007. Prior to Cha's death almost every past and current member of the band, including Cha reunited for a sell out gig, titled BURNS NIGHT at the o2 ABC in Sauchiehall Street, Glasgow, playing an extensive part of the back catalogue with the aim of raising money towards treatment for Cha.

=== 2020s ===
The Silencers's new album "Silent Highway" was released on October the 13th, 2023, after 19 years, and returns to the classic songwriting style O'Neill championed in the 80s. Jimme O’Neill, based in Brittany, France since 2000 has completed numerous solo and collabarative projects in the interim years but lockdown provided the time and a unique opportunity to record a new Silencers album with the family learning parts over zoom, James and Aura were able to record in Glasgow while Jimme and Baptiste completed their parts in Nantes.

Aura once again sings the title track, (“Silent Highway”, as well as “Onmamind”) for which she collaborates on the lyrics, – Baptiste Brondy, from Nantes – now also drummer of french caribbean blues rock band "Delgrès", co-produced the record, and James provides guitars and vocals this eighth album was recorded in France at Nantes by Ben Bridgen, and mixed in Glasgow by Chris Gordon.

Live the band continue to play in Scotland, Spain, France and Switzerland and the new album has been credited as a return to the original sound and spirit of the band, another of O'Neill's sons Conor O'Neill who had replaced James as lead guitarist for previous gigs when James was signed to Universal Germany for "Martin and James" is now a permanent member alongside his brother and sister making the band a truly family affair. Baptiste shares drumming with Matthieu Zirn when busy with other projects and Bass guitar is Steph Greer, who joined in 1999 with James and is previously of Scottish group The Kevin McDermott Orchestra.

== Discography ==
=== Albums ===
- A Letter From St. Paul (1987), RCA
- A Blues for Buddha (1988), RCA
- Dance to the Holy Man (1991) - UK #39
- Seconds of Pleasure (1993), RCA - UK #52
- So Be It (1995), BMG France
- Receiving (1999), Uncanny Records
- Come (2004), Keltia Musique
- Silent Highway (2023), Music Box Publishing / Wagram

=== Live albums ===
- A Night of Electric Silence (2001), Last Call/Wagram Music
- En Concert (2006), Keltia Musique
- Roads and Roots (2026), Music Box Publishing / Wagram

=== Compilation albums ===
- Blood and Rain (1996), BMG France

=== Singles ===
- "Painted Moon" (1987) - No. 57 UK, No. 82 US, No. 41 AUS
- "I Can't Cry" (1987)
- "I See Red" (1988) - No. 93 UK
- "Answer Me" (1988) - No. 89 UK
- "The Real McCoy" (1988) - No. 81 UK
- "Scottish Rain" (1989) - No. 71 UK
- "Razor Blades of Love" (1989) - No. 23 US Modern Rock
- "I Want You" (1991)
- "Bulletproof Heart" (1991)
- "Hey Mr. Bank Manager" (1991)
- "I Can Feel It" (1993) - No. 62 UK
- "Number One Friend" (1995)
- "Something Worth Fighting For" (1995)
- "27" (1995)
- "Wild Mountain Thyme" (1995)
- "Receiving" (1999)
- "Partytime in Heaven" (1999)
- "67 Overdrive" (23rd of june, 2023)
- "Whistleblower" (22nd of september, 2023)

=== Solo album - Jimme O'Neill ===
- Real (2008), Keltia Musique
