= Dan Donnelly (singer) =

Northern Irish singer

- Born: Daniel Thomas Donnelly; Belfast, Northern Ireland
- Genres: Singer-songwriter, musician
- Instruments: Vocals, guitar, mandolin, percussion
- Years active: 1994–present
- Labels: IRL, On the Fiddle
- Website: Dan Donnelly on Facebook

Dan Donnelly is a Northern Irish singer-songwriter and a member of the Levellers since 2022.

== Career ==
Growing up in Belfast, Donnelly played in a number of local bands, finding success in Ireland with Watercress, a four-piece acoustic folk-rock band for whom he played guitar, mandolin, percussion and "plumbing" (a home-made didgeridoo). They released six EPs between 1995 and 1998, when they released their one album, Bummer, all on their own local label, Creeping Herb. The Donnelly-penned Candlemaker reached the No.1 position on the Irish Indie Chart. Watercress played their final concert at the Empire Music Hall in Belfast on 23 December 2000 and disbanded in early 2001.

After Watercress disbanded, Donnelly moved to New York to pursue a solo career. Whilst there he released two studio albums, Bootleg (2005), and Yearning a Living (2007), which received extensive airtime on BBC Radio, as well as one live album Live in NYC (2008). Donnelly was backed on all three albums by his supporting band Sonovagun (Sean Barry, Graham Finn, Ray Burns and Roy Harter). Donnelly also played as a session musician for several artists, including Joy Zipper.

In 2009, Donnelly returned to the UK to live, settling in Exeter, Devon. In mid-2010 he signed with record label IRL (Independent Records Ltd). In October 2010, he released the single Running, followed by the album Country & Northern in May 2011. Around the same time, Donnelly recorded a cover of Paradise City by Guns N' Roses which featured in a television advert for Anchor Butter. Axl Rose threatened to sue him if he officially released his cover of Paradise City which he has stated in many live performances before playing the song. He then relocated to Middlesbrough in the North East of England.

Donnelly has toured with both solo shows and in support of artists such as The Levellers, Damien Dempsey, Duke Special and The Dodge Brothers. He has also performed as part of the live bands of The Levellers, Oysterband and Joy Zipper. His own recording and touring live band, Sonovagun, has included Ali McMordie of Stiff Little Fingers on bass guitar and television composer Roy Harter on keyboards and theremin.

Donnelly has performed on the UK summer festival circuit, including at Glastonbury Festival's Leftfield stage, Beautiful Days festival, The Big Session, and various festivals throughout Europe.

In May 2014, Donnelly was announced as the newest member of the alternative rock band The Wonder Stuff, co-writing their top 40 album 30 Goes Around the Sun.

In 2018, Donnelly became the lead singer and guitarist for French super group The Celtic Social Club. After a number of European festival performances, they released the album From Babylon to Avalon, co-written by Donnelly, in 2019.

Donnelly's fifth studio album entitled, Are We Having Fun? was released in November 2018 on On the Fiddle Records. The album was preceded by the singles Time of Our Lives and I Don't Care.

In 2020, Donnelly collaborated with Goulven Hamel and Anth Mills to form a new project The Wooden Faces. They released the album / audio experiment, Flying the Wrong Way in May 2020.

Donnelly completed a master's degree in music in 2019. Since 2021 he has been managing The Peacock, a music venue, pub and kitchen in Sunderland with his business partner Barry Hyde of The Futureheads. The pair previously managed The Academy of Music and Sound in Gateshead, Tyne and Wear. He is also a member of the Stockton on Tees based male voice choir, Infant Hercules.

In 2022, the Levellers announced that Donnelly was joining as a full-time member., which coincided with his departure from Celtic Social Club.

== Discography ==
=== Solo ===
- Running E.P. (2010)
- Country & Northern (2011)
- Are We Having Fun? (2018)

=== With Watercress ===
- Candlemaker E.P. (1996) No.1 Irish Indie Chart
- Tripped Up E.P. (1996)
- Bummer (1998)
- Oh Yeah E.P. (2000)

=== With Sonovagun ===
- Bootleg (2005)
- The Beach E.P. (2006)
- Yearning a Living (2007)
- Live in NYC (2008)

=== With The Wonderstuff ===
- 30 Goes Around the Sun (March 2016) No. 38 UK Album Chart

=== With The Celtic Social Club ===
- From Babylon To Avalon (2019)
- Dancing or dying ? (2021)

=== With The Wooden Faces ===
- Flying The Wrong Way (2020)
