= Java (band) =

French rap group

- Origin: Paris, France
- Genres: Pop
- Years active: 2000-2010
- Members: Erwan Séguillon (R.wan); François-Xavier Bossard (Fixi); Jérôme Boivin (Pépouseman); Alexis Bossard (Bistrol Banto)
- Past members: Marlon

Java is a French rap group, formed in 2000 as a cooperation between Erwan Séguillon (R.wan) and François-Xavier Bossard (Fixi). Other members include Jérôme Boivin and Alexis Bossard. The band is famous for its lyrics that contain a lot of puns, and for its musette musical style, using accordions. In 2008, the collective expanded with the inclusion of producer and multi-instrumentalist K-Mille.

== Career ==
In its formative year, the band released Hawaï, its debut album with the single "Pépettes" with immediate success and a live album Java Sur Seine the following year. They recorded their album Safari Croisière in Brazil in 2003, that included the single "Samba do Jerusalem". After a cool-off period where various members made solo recording, they came together for a third album released on 27 April 2009, right after a tour in a long tour that included Australia. On 7 September 2010, the band announced that they were going on a hiatus for an undetermined period.

== Members ==
- Erwan Séguillon alias R.wan – vocals, singer-songwriter
- François-Xavier Bossard alias Fixi – accordion/keyboard
- Jérôme Boivin alias Pépouseman – double bass
- Alexis Bossard alias Bistrol Banto – drums

== Solo careers ==
In addition to their joint work in Java, members François-Xavier Bossard (also known as Fixi) and Erwan Seguillon have developed their own solo careers

=== Erwan Séguillon ===
Erwan Séguillon also known as R.wan (or R.Wan or R.WAN) (born in Paris in 1974) has been active since 2006 in releasing his own solo albums: Radio Cortex in 2006, Radio Cortex 2 in 2008 and Peau Rouge in 2012. He is the son of journalist Pierre-Luc Séguillon.

Erwan also worked with a group of songwriters known as "Saint-Ouen All Stars" (that included Gilles Lavanant, Nicolas Kassilchik and Michel Ange Mérinot in addition to R.wan). A dramatic fire accident damaged the recording studio and sound engineer and producer Lucas Chauvière was injured in his hand, but could finish the album with one hand.

=== François-Xavier Bossard / Fixi ===
François-Xavier Bossard a multi-instrumentalist also known as Fixi has worked with a number of artists. He cooperated with Jamaican artist Winston McAnuff producing McAnuff's opus Paris Rockin' .

With Winston McAnuff, he has jointly released the Garden of Love EP (4 tracks) followed by the album A New Day both in 2013.

== Discography ==
List of studio albums, with selected chart positions
Album details	Peak chart positions	Notes
Album details	FRA	Notes
Hawaï: Date released: 2000; Type: Studio album; Record label: Sony/S.M.A.L.L.	187	1. Sex, accordéon et alcool 2. Pépétes; 3. Chihuahua; 4. Dieu; 5. Hawaii; 6. Métro; 7. Le Ramses'; 8. C'est la vie 9. Interlude; 10. Le poil 11. Danser; 12. Au banquet des chasseurs 13. Mon monde
Sur Seine: Date released: 2001; Type: live album; Record label: Sony/S.M.A.L.L.	–	1. Apocalypse; 2. Pépètes; 3. Chronique d'Une Toxine; 4. Hawaï; 5. Le Poil; 6. Danser; 7. Sexe, Accordéon et Alcool
Safari Croisière: Date released: 2003; Type: Studio album; Record label: Makasound/PIAS	31	1. 6/8; 2. Ce S'ra Tout; 3. Bzzz; 4. Samba Do Jerusalem; 5. Carte Bleue; 6. Sacrifice Chez Les Zombile; 7. Le 10; 8. Cendrier; 9. Alinea; 10. Trafic Info (G pour L); 11. La Muse; 12. La Guerre
Maudit français: Date released: 2009; Type: Studio album; Record label: Makasound/PIAS	46	1. Intro; 2. J'me marre 3. Folklore; 4. On; 5. Mots dits français 6. Ouais; 7. J'java; 8. L'amer à boire 9. Moi je moi je 10. Bling bling 11. Et ça repart 12. Ta gueule 13. Paris musée 14. Tête de nœud 15. Mona; 16. Loin

== Discography by members (solo) ==
Fixi (François-Xavier Bossard)

Year	Album	Peak positions	Certification
Year	Album	FR	Certification
2013	Garden of Love EP (with Winston McAnuff)	–	
2013	A New Day (with Winston McAnuff)	74	

R.wan (Erwan Séguillon)

Year	Album	Peak positions	Certification
Year	Album	FR	Certification
2006	Radio Cortex	–	
2008	Radio Cortex 2	169	
2012	Peau Rouge	–	
