= Roy Harter =

Musical artist (born 1973)

- Roy Harter in his home studio, 2003

Background information
- Born: Roy Gunther Harter; March 6, 1973 (age 53); Sunnyside, Queens, New York
- Genres: Country, Rock, Dub, Experimental, Ska, Folk, Blues, Metal
- Occupations: Sound Designer, Musician, Radio Personality
- Instruments: Keyboards, Accordion, Theremin, Guitar, Drums

Roy Harter (born March 6, 1973) is a New York Emmy award-winning, composer, sound designer and audio mixer, best known for his work in television and film. He is also a multi-instrumentalist for various performing and recording artists. Harter was the founder and owner of the post-production facility SkinnyMan, located in Times Square, New York.

== Biography ==
=== Editional Effects ===
In 1998 Harter became co-owner of the audio division of the television post-production facility Editional Effects, (EENYC) located in Times Square, New York City. He set up and ran their audio division.

=== SkinnyMan ===
In 2003 Harter set up his television and film post-production facility SkinnyMan, in Times Square, New York City. He has composed music, mixed television commercials, promos, and shows for many major television networks. SkinnyMan served as a home base and recording studio for all of Harter's musical projects.

=== Credits ===
Roy Harter is the music composer for a number of television and internet shows, including the popular Nickelodeon game show, Figure It Out. He is the composer for astrophysicist Neil deGrasse Tyson’s show StarTalk, as well as Don Jamieson’s “That Jamieson Show”.

Harter performs and tours with various musical artists and bands, including Dan Donnelly's live band Sonovagun, The Membranes, Goldblade, The Fabulous Good Time Party Boys, Ray Wylie Hubbard, Damien Dempsey, Duke Special, The Levellers, The Pietasters, 3 Daft Monkeys, The Celtic Social Club, Pattern Pusher, and Common.

Using various musicians, including members of Paul Simon's band and Stiff Little Fingers, Roy Harter composed all the promotional music for the children's television network Noggin. The "Alley Pond Park Ensemble" he created for the project was given strict rules that only allowed the musicians to perform using common household items, such as pots and pans.

Roy Harter giving a televised alpine bell performance in Times Square, New York

On October 21, 2005 Harter gave a televised alpine bell performance in Times Square, New York City. The event was sponsored by Verizon and aired on Nickelodeon. The performance was also simulcast on the Viacom Jumbo-Tron Screen in Times Square, New York.

From January 2007 to 2010, Harter hosted a weekly radio show entitled "Roy Harter's Outlaw Hour", airing every Sunday night on UK based, Tinternet Radio. The show was primarily a music program showcasing outlaw country and rebellious musical acts, both classic and modern.

Since 2011, Harter has become a regular character on "The Davey Mac Sports Program", hosted by Dave McDonald. He plays the musical sidekick character of "Roy Shaffer", often interrupting and accompanying the host with humorous musical stings. The radio show was broadcast on SiriusXM every Saturday night at 7-10 PM (EST) on the Opie Radio channel.

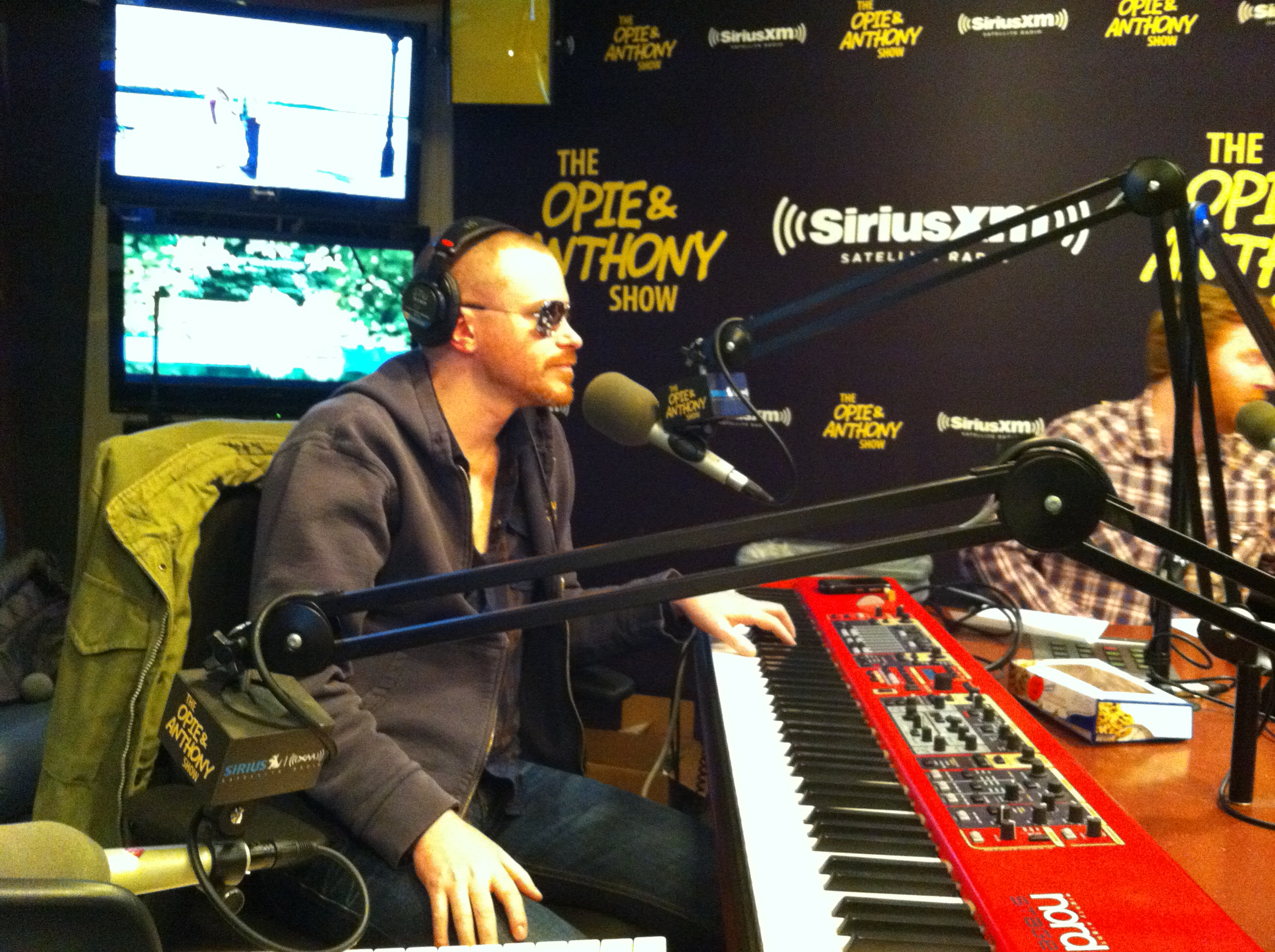
Roy Harter aka Roy Shaffer in the Opie and Anthony Studio

From 2016 to 2022 Harter was the musical director and co-host of the East Side Dave Show on Compound Media.

Harter is involved with The Beatles Complete On Ukulele project. This worldwide musical project, founded by David Barratt, features a re-recorded version of an original Beatles song, with a ukulele in every arrangement. Harter has produced tracks with radio personality Sherwin Sleeves, as well as bestselling author Deepak Chopra for the project.

Since May 2015 he has been a featured accordionist of The Celtic Social Club (collective of Scottish, Breton, French and New York musicians). Their album unplugged New York City was released in France on October 30 on the label Keltia Musique.

== Filmography ==
- 2003: Tide – Composer
- 2005: The Mad One – Actor
- 2007: Area X - Composer
- 2007: Astoria Park – Sound Design / Mix
- 2007: The Slackers - Sound Design / Mix
- 2008: Act As If - Sound Design / Mix
- 2010: Go-Go - Composer / Sound Design / Mix
- 2010: After the Catch (Season 4) - Sound Design / Mix
- 2012: Nickelodeon's Figure It Out - Composer

== Discography ==
As Roy Harter

- 2016: Roy Harter presents Stingers and Songs from The East Side Dave Show
- 2013: Oddy Clone With Sherwin Sleeves
- 2003: Lover of Beauty and Coffee Breath

As Audio Engineer or Producer

- 2001: Liz Skillman - "In the Middle"
- 2002: Liz Skillman - "Wayphoria"
- 2000: Abbey of Regina Laudis - "Women in Chant"
- 2000: Bed Devils - "Le Caprice"
- 1999: Dequincy's Dream - "Solfege"
- 1998: Dequincy's Dream - "Jeepers Mister, Thanks for the Sweet Deal"

With Dan Donnelly & Sonovagun

- 2006: Bootleg
- 2006: The Beach E.P.
- 2007: Yearning a Living
- 2008: Live in NYC
- 2010: Running E.P.
- 2011: Country and Northern
