= The Celtic Social Club =

Rock music band in Scotland

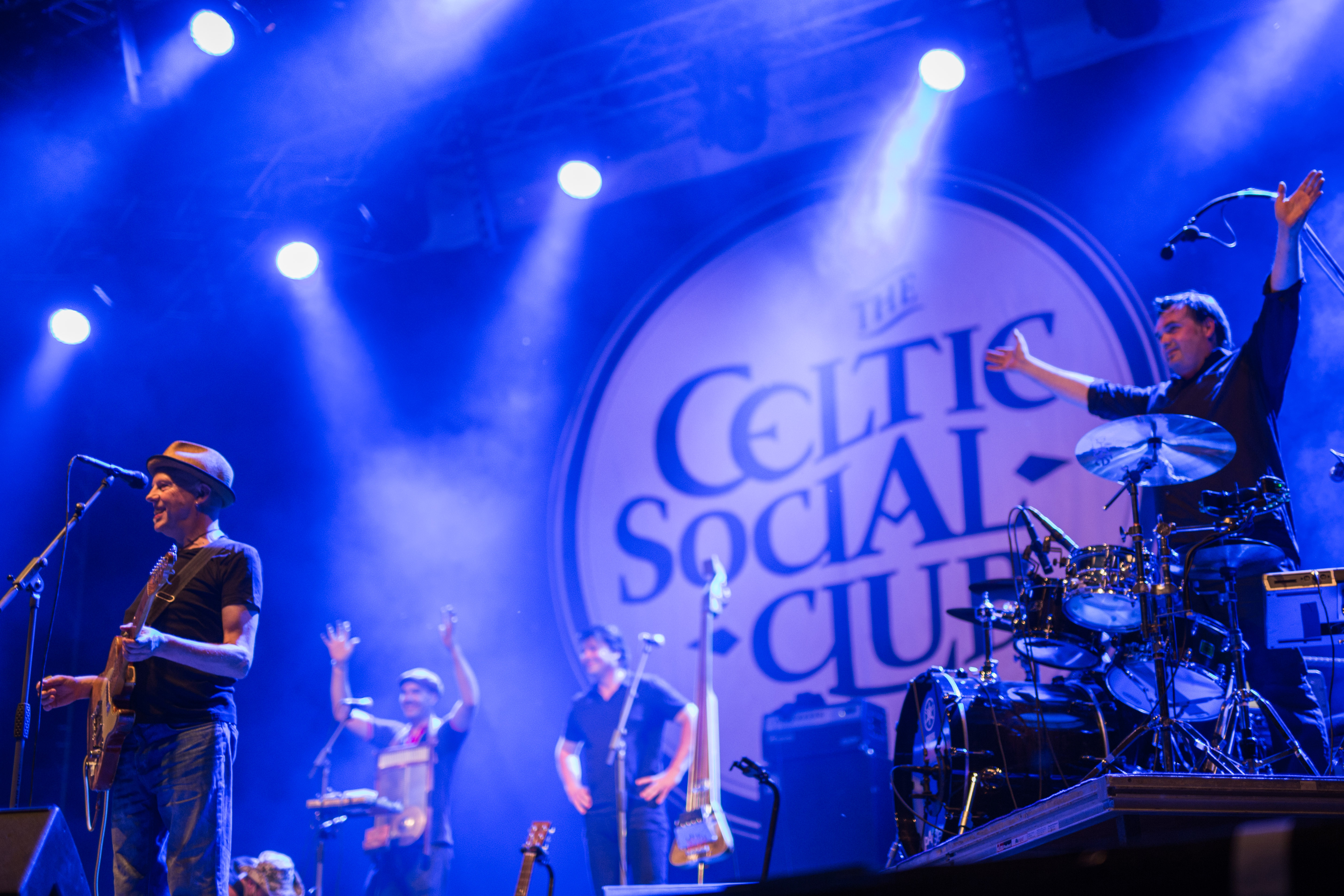
- The Celtic Social Club, 2015

Background information
- Origin: Brittany, Scotland
- Genres: Rock, Celtic music, world music
- Years active: 2013–present
- Labels: Sony Music, Keltia Musique
- Members: Taylor Byrne; Manu Masko; Dan Donnelly; Ronan La Bars; Pierre Stéphan; Mathieu Péquériau; Richard Puaud; Goulven Hamel
- Website: celticsocialclub.com

The Celtic Social Club is a Franco-Irish band formed in 2013, blending Celtic music with rock, folk, reggae, and punk.

Originally created for a one-off concert at the Vieilles Charrues Festival in 2014, the project quickly turned into a permanent band and began touring internationally (United Kingdom, United States, Asia, Europe).

To date, the band has released four studio albums, one best-of album (Inventory, 2024), and is preparing a fifth album scheduled for release in October 2025.

== History ==
=== Origins and formation (2013–2014) ===
In 2013, drummer and producer Manu Masko imagined a project mixing traditional Celtic music with contemporary influences, inspired by the concept of the Buena Vista Social Club.[citation needed] He brought together artists from different scenes — rock, folk, reggae, as well as Breton, Scottish and Irish music — with the aim of adapting traditional tunes into a modern format.[citation needed]

The project took shape with an initial performance, originally intended as a one-off, at the Vieilles Charrues Festival on 18 July 2014, before an audience of about 40,000 spectators.

The first line-up included Jimme O’Neill (The Silencers), Jean-Pierre Riou (Red Cardell), Ronán Le Bars, Pierre Stéphan, Mathieu Péquériau and Richard Puaud. Guest performers at this concert included Breton singer Louise Ebrel, New York rapper IC Will,[citation needed] and Breton folk singer Colline Hill.[citation needed]

The first single, "Celtic Social Club", entered the playlist of France Inter, which broadcast the concert in its entirety the same evening.

Prior to this concert, the group had recorded their debut album, The Celtic Social Club, produced by Manu Masko,[citation needed] at La Sirène (La Rochelle),[citation needed] mixed in New York by Ariel Borujow, and released on 18 June 2014 on the Breton label Keltia Musique. The album alternates between original compositions and re-interpretations of traditional themes from Ireland, Scotland, Brittany, and other Celtic regions.[citation needed]

=== First tours and affirmation of style (2015–2017) ===
Following positive reactions from audiences and the media, the band began touring in March 2015, with concerts in France, Switzerland, Germany, and the United States. A notable appearance in New York led to the recording of the live album Unplugged in NYC, released in October 2015 and mixed by Ariel Borujow.

Jean-Pierre Riou left the band after a concert at Moulin du Roc (Niort) in December 2015, and was replaced by Goulven Hamel, who had previously contributed to the group's communications (texts and visuals).[citation needed]

In January 2016, the band recorded three tracks (A New Kind of Freedom, The Birds, When You Need Someone) with producer John Reynolds at La Sirène (La Rochelle), before finalizing the album at Alhambra Colbert studio (Rochefort) and mixing it in New York with Ariel Borujow.

The second studio album, A New Kind of Freedom, was released in 2017. The band continued touring in China, Vietnam, Turkey, and Algeria.

In October 2016, the group played in Central Park (New York) as part of the 25th anniversary of the Vieilles Charrues Festival. A short U.S. tour followed in September 2017, although it did not fully meet expectations due to logistical and financial difficulties.[citation needed]

- Manu Masko (2013–present): drums, percussion, keyboard, samples, loops, backing vocals / art direction
- Ronan Le Bars (2013–present): Uilleann pipes, low whistle
- Pierre Stéphan (2013–present): fiddle
- Mathieu Péquériau (2013–present): harmonica, washboard, backing vocals
- Richard Puaud (2013–present): bass, backing vocals
- Goulven Hamel (2016–present): electric guitar, mandolin, banjo
- Taylor Byrne (2022-present): lead vocals, Acoustic guitar

=== Former member ===
- Jean-Pierre Riou (2013–2015): lead vocals, twelve-string guitar, mandolin, banjo, bombard
- Jimme O'Neill (2013–2018): lead vocals, Acoustic and electric guitar
- Martin Kelly (2018): lead vocals, Acoustic and electric guitar
- Dan Donnelly (2018–2022): lead vocals, Acoustic and electric guitar

=== Guests ===
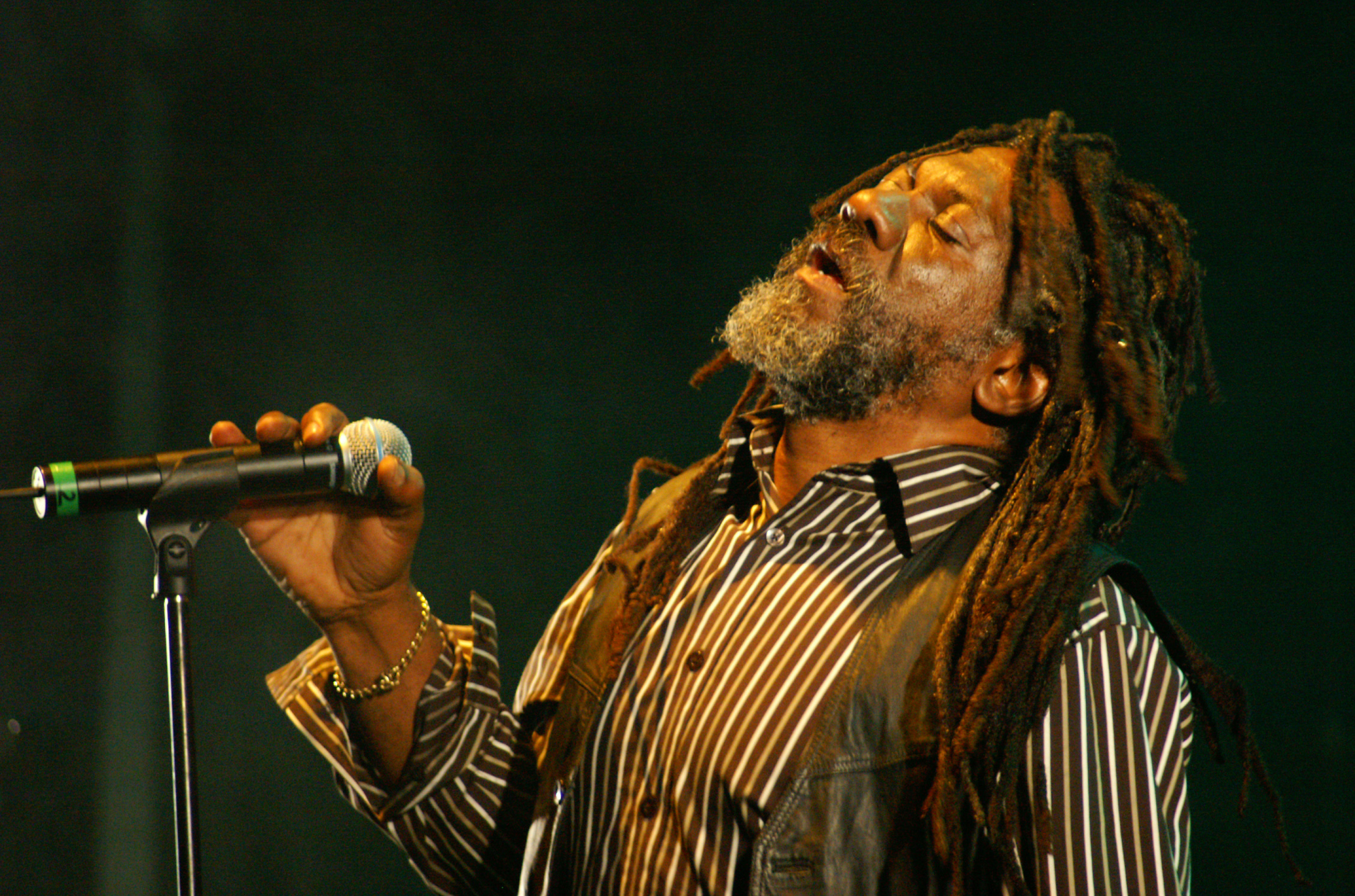
Winston McAnuff

- Winston McAnuff: lead vocals
- I.C. Will: lead vocals
- Faada Freddy: lead vocals
- Colline Hill: lead vocals, acoustic guitar
- Louise Ebrel: lead vocals
- Steven Bodénès: bombard
- Roy Harter: accordion

== Discography ==
=== Studio albums ===
Year	Title	Notes
2014	The Celtic Social Club	Debut studio album
2017	A New Kind of Freedom	Studio album
2019	From Babylon to Avalon	Studio album (France release)
2020	From Babylon to Avalon (UK version)	UK reissue including additional live tracks
2021	Dancing or Dying ?	Studio album
2025	You Should Know (planned, October 2025)	Upcoming studio album

=== Live albums ===
Year	Title	Notes
2014	Live Vieilles Charrues 2014	Recorded at the Vieilles Charrues Festival, Carhaix
2015	Unplugged in NYC	Acoustic live album, recorded in New York
2018	Summer Tour 2018 (Live)	Recorded during the band's European summer tour
2021	Live Vieilles Charrues	Digital release, performance from the 2014 festival
2022	Made in Brittany (Live)	Recorded in Brittany
2023	Live aux Vieilles Charrues	Recorded at the Vieilles Charrues Festival

=== Compilations ===
Year	Title	Notes
2024	Inventory	Best-of / Compilation

=== Singles ===
Year	Title
2014	"Celtic Social Club"
2016	"Christmas 1914"
2019	"Remember Joe Strummer"
2019	"From Babylon to Avalon"
2019	"Sunshine"
2020	"I'm Free (Radio Edit)"
2021	"For Real"
2021	"Home"
2022	"For Real (Rise Up)"
2022	"The Auld Triangle"
2023	"Far Away from Here"
2023	"Suddenly"
2024	"I Can't Wait Anymore"
2025	"Love Is a Madness"
2025	"You Should Know"
