= Winston McAnuff =

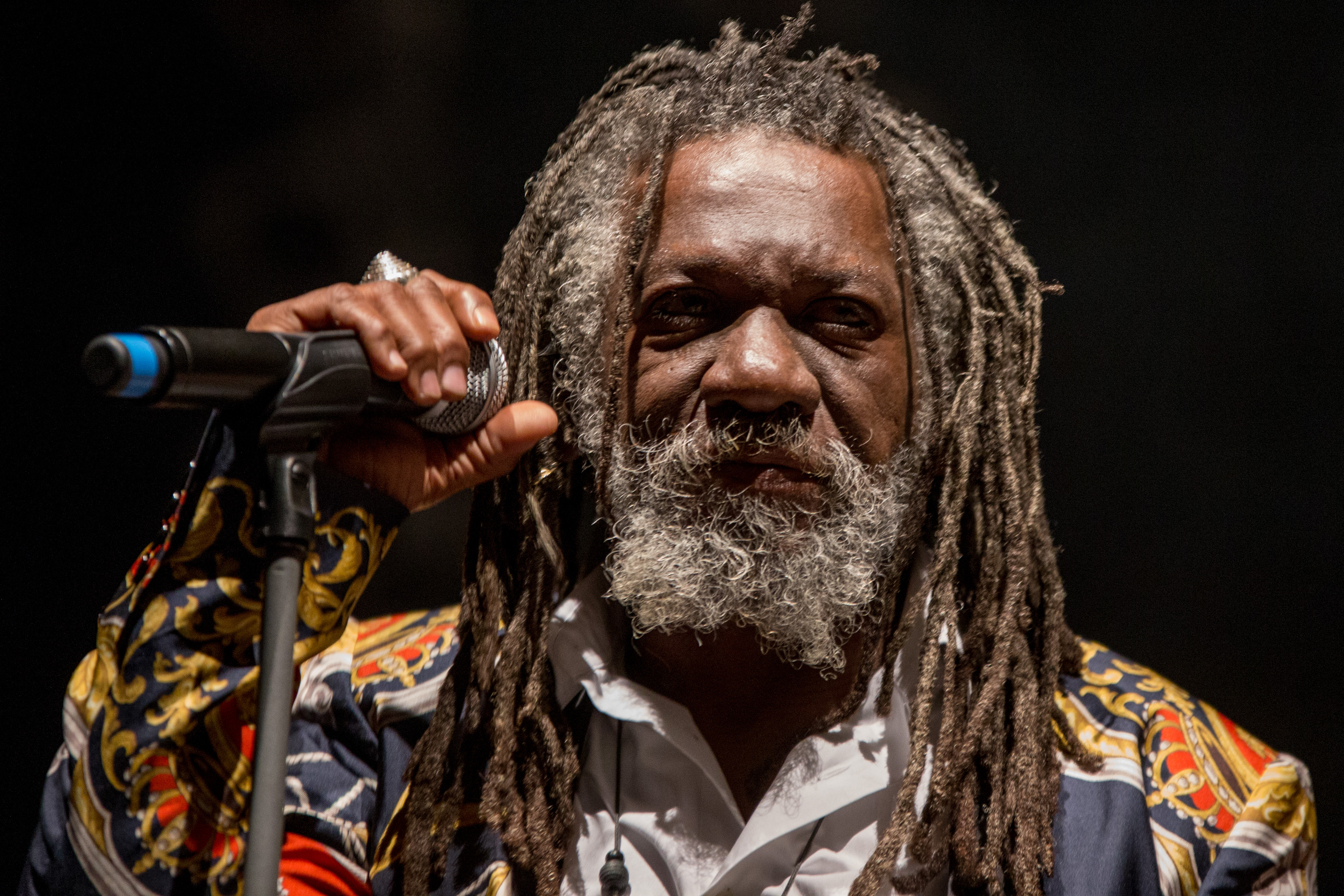
- McAnuff on stage in Rudolstadt, Germany, July 2014

Background information
- Born: Winston Boyd McAnuff; 1957 (age 67–68); Manchester Parish, Jamaica
- Genres: Reggae; dub; funk
- Occupations: Singer-songwriter; musician
- Instruments: Vocals; guitar; percussion
- Years active: 1978–1986; 2005–present
- Labels: Chrystal Records; Makasound; The Bombist
- Website: www.myspace.com/winstonmcanuff

Winston Boyd McAnuff, also known under the stage name Electric Dread (born 1957) is a Jamaican singer and composer of reggae and dub music.

== Life and career ==
McAnuff was born in Manchester Parish, Jamaica into a family of preachers. One of his great-grandfathers was Scottish. He started his musical career singing gospel in the church choir. He recorded his first album Pick Hits to Click in 1978. Two years later his second album What the man "a" deal wid was released. His best known song from this time is the single "Malcolm X" (about Malcolm X), which was also recorded by Earl Sixteen, and most successfully by Dennis Brown. It was originally recorded by McAnuff for Joe Gibbs but the producer decided not to release it, and he got Earl Sixteen to record it before the song was given to Dennis Brown who recorded it for his Visions of Dennis Brown album. The song was the subject of a legal dispute in 2013 between McAnuff and Greensleeves Records after the record label allegedly registered the song as co-written by Brown. A third studio album, Electric Dread, was released in 1986.

Although McAnuff had reasonable fame in Jamaica, none of his work was released elsewhere. It wasn't until 2002 that his work was released in Europe. In 2002 the French record label Makasound released the first two albums and a compilation album Diary of the Silent Years. The release of the albums revived McAnuff's career, notably in France.

In 2005 McAnuff released the album A Drop, which he recorded with the French keyboard player Camille Bazbaz. This record displays a mix of rock, funk, dub and punk rock. A year later, in 2006, a new album Paris Rockin', which he recorded with Java and other French session musicians, was released. His last album, Nostradamus, was released in 2008. The album was a concept album about the predictions of Nostradamus.

In 2011, he took part in Les Échos Du Temps the latest album of Danakil, a French roots reggae band, on the track "Media" where both he and his son Matthew were featured. This is the last apparition of his son, murdered 22 August 2012 in a street fight.

In 2013 he released the album A New Day, a collaboration with French musician Fixi.

In 2014 he sings on two songs of the first album of The Celtic Social Club, a collective of Scottish, Breton, French and New Yorker musicians.

In 2017, he releases the album Rabbi Son with French producers Bost & Bim on their own label The Bombist.

McAnuff's nephew is professional footballer Jobi McAnuff.

== Discography ==
=== Studio albums ===
- Pick Hits to Click (1978)
- What the Man "a" Deal Wid (1980)
- Electric Dread (1986)
- One Love (1995) – a rerelease of What the Man "a" Deal Wid
- Paris Rockin' (2006)
- Nostradamus (2008)
- Rabbi Son (2017)

=== Compilation albums ===
- Diary of the Silent Years (2002) – compilation

=== Joint albums ===
- A Drop (2005) – with Camille Bazbaz
- A Bang (2011) with The Bazbaz Orchestra
- Garden of Love EP (2013) – with Fixi
- A New Day (2013) with Fixi
- Big Brothers (2018) with Fixi
