= Houles fairy =

Fairies from Breton Folkrore specific to the Channel coast

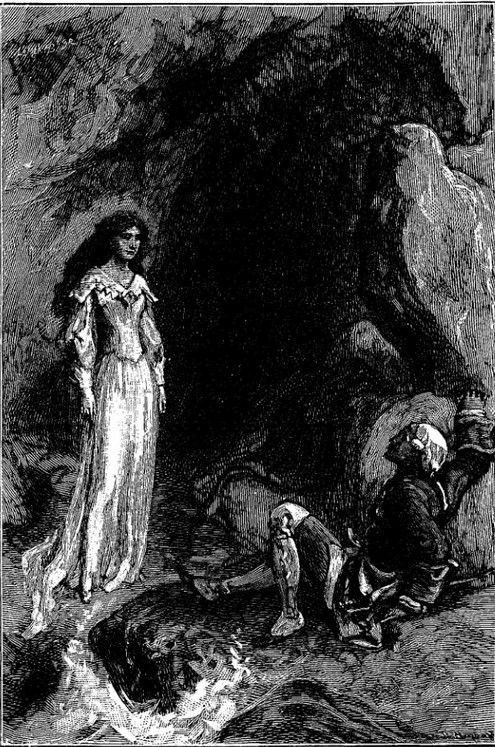
- Illustration of the tale La fée des Houles, collected by Paul Sébillot, published in 1883 in Contes de terre et de mer

Creature information
- Grouping: Popular folklore
- Sub grouping: Fairy
- Similar entities: Morgen

Origin
- Country: France
- Region: Upper Brittany, Cotentin, Channel Islands
- Habitat: Seaside caves

Houles fairies (Breton: Gwenn fadoù) are fairies specific to the Channel coast, stretching from Cancale to Tréveneuc in Upper Brittany, to the Channel Islands, and known from a few fragments of stories in the Cotentin region. They live in coastal caves and caverns known as houles. Reputed to be magnificent, immortal and very powerful, they are sensitive to salt. Rather benevolent, the swell fairies described in local stories live in communities, do their own laundry, bake their own bread or tend their own flocks, marry male fairies and are served by warrior goblins called Fions. They come to the aid of humans in many ways, providing food and enchanted objects, but get angry if anyone disrespects them or acquires the power to see their disguises without their consent.

Paul Sébillot's collections, in French and Gallo, have yielded some fifty tales and fragments of legends evoking these creatures. The houles fairies, considered "semi-divinities", were probably worshipped locally by the Upper Bretons. Belief in them waned considerably in the 19th century, under the religious influence of Christianity and teachers. Collected stories themselves evoke the disappearance of these fairies, often as a consequence of the loss of their immortality and powers.

== Etymology and terminology ==
Paul Sébillot has collected almost all of the information on houles fairies. Contrary to what their name suggests, they don't owe this one to a link with the waves of the sea, but rather to the name given to the sea caves and grottoes on the cliffs of the north coast of Upper Brittany and Cotentin, "houles" or more rarely "goules". Paul Sébillot says the name is French, but he also specifies an origin "from the Gallot country". For him, it's rather difficult to determine the etymology of the word "houle", which probably doesn't come from Breton. According to him and Françoise Morvan, the English word "hole" is the closest, since it has the same meaning. Subsequent etymological research indicates that the word "houle" is more likely to come from the Norman dialect.

== Characteristics ==
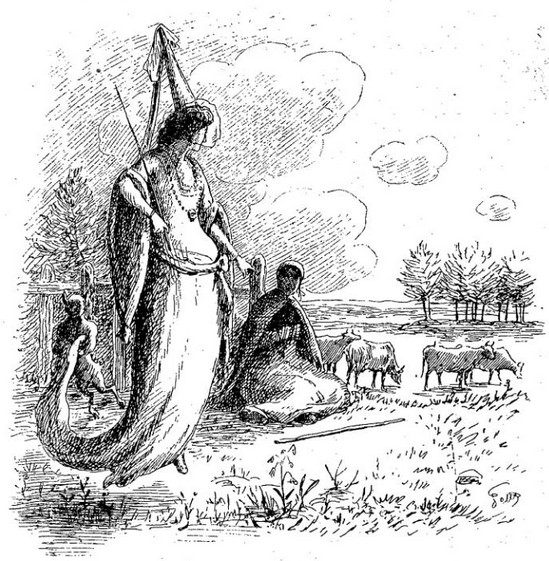
Illustration for the tale "La houle du châtelet", 1883. Published in Paul Sébillot's Contes de terre et de mer.

The stories and fragments of legends have many features in common, enabling us to reconstruct the idea that the inhabitants of the north coast of Upper Brittany had of the houles fairies in the 19th century. According to Sébillot, they considered them to be "semi-divinities". However, some information has been irretrievably lost. Houles fairies are quite numerous. They usually operate on land, and have almost no connection with water, despite their habitat. They may originally have had the power to walk on water, as two stories suggest. They tend to be contemplative and fundamentally beneficial. Reputed to be immortal, very powerful and immune to disease, they fear salt, which renders them mortal. They live in caves and caverns (houles) in coastal cliffs surrounded by reefs. These houles can be very large and luxuriously furnished, with everything needed to bake, teach, make music and dine, in true Otherworldly fashion. In the one at Saint-Briac, gold ships are built. They are respectfully referred to in French as "bonne dames" (good ladies) or "nos bonnes dames les fées" (our good ladies the fairies). The names of some of these fairies are well known: la Truitonne, la Merlitonne, Gladieuse and Fleur du rocher. Some are of royal descent and the children of magicians, capable in particular of monstrous metamorphoses. The fairies of the Grouin houle are an exception, as these evil fairies are described as cursed and cause much harm. Sébillot also notes a connection with the Basque Lamia, who have affinities with the houles fairies.

=== Appearance ===
They are most often described as tall, beautiful blond ladies. Most houles fairies are dressed in gray cloth. A few are similar to old groac'h-type fairies, adept at metamorphosis and whose role is more obscure. As they grow older, they become stunted and cover themselves with seaweed. Until they are baptized (and therefore stop being immortal), these fairies have worms in their mouths.

According to Françoise Morvan, another creature in Breton tales, the "man of the sea", is an intermediary between the houles fairies and the male sirens. She notes a certain assimilation between female korrigans and houles fairies in some tales, although in their respective descriptions, these creatures are completely opposite. Houles fairies are quite similar to mermaids, in their beauty and their voices that entice young fishermen.

=== Occupations and social life ===
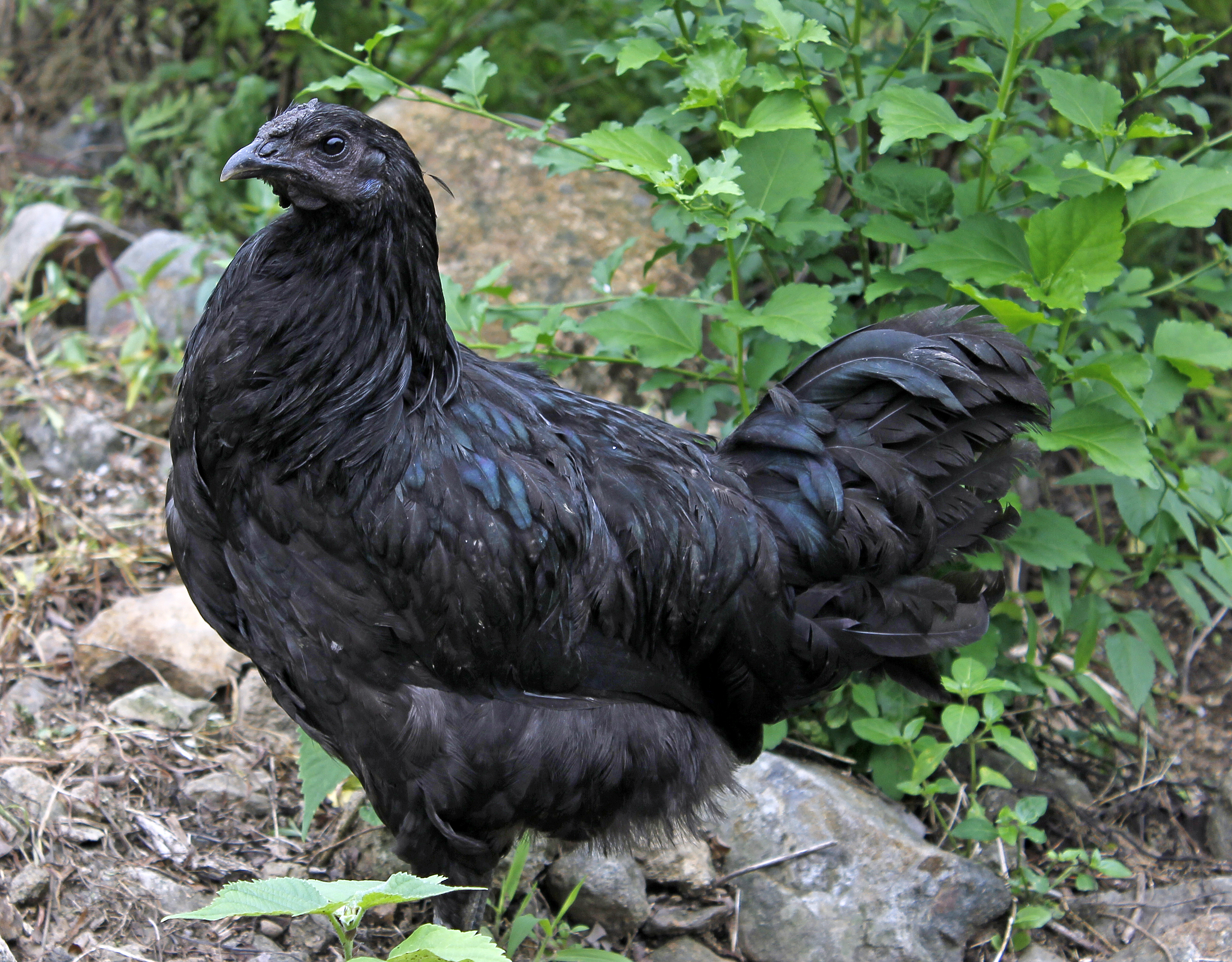
Houles fairies often have black chickens.

Houles fairies are little different from humans in their occupations and sociability, their lifestyle being comparable to that of lords or wealthy landowners. They keep their living quarters sparkling clean, baking bread, spinning wool and cloth, fishing, and hanging out their white washing in the sun. In the evening, they cradle their children, sing or dance in the moonlight. Their children receive instruction in music (fairies play the violin and sing underground a song "so sweet and melodious that just listening to it [one] falls into ecstasy"), metamorphosis and clairvoyance. They also possess a wide variety of magical objects, including a golden ship and a cord that can be passed around the body to move on land and sea.

These fairies sometimes visit their fellow creatures. One of their particularities is that they live in matriarchal communities with other fairies of the same type. They can marry, and their husbands are called "fetauds" or "féetauds" (male fairies). They give birth to chubby children. Warrior goblins called "Fions" are their servants. They also have a wide variety of domestic animals, most often black hens, roosters and cats, but also all kinds of herds of cattle, sheep and goats, which have the particularity of making themselves invisible to graze on the land of neighboring farmers. More rarely, they have geese and, exceptionally, horses.

=== Interaction with humans ===
Interactions between these fairies and humans are numerous. Houle fairies are easily visible to all at night, but during the day, only a human gifted with clairvoyance (thanks to a magic ointment they rub into their eyes) would be able to see them in all their disguises. Fairies don't hesitate to respond to requests or provide bread (which has the particularity of never diminishing) and cakes (sometimes with a jug of cider) or even healing potions, as long as the request is formulated with respect and politeness. Gifts also include lard, butter, wine, a purse that never runs out, unwearable clothes that fit children, magic wands, enchanted ships. Some tales even mention that these fairies run schools where human children are admitted if they ask: here they learn to metamorphose, to see illusions and invisible things. Sociable, the houles fairies are easily visible as long as they remain on land: Fréhel fishermen claim to have seen them dancing many times on the moor. Occasionally, some of them commit petty theft by lifting lobster traps or grazing their invisible flock on someone else's pasture. This prompts farmers and fishermen to set traps for them, which the fairies easily foil. They have no malicious intent, however. According to Françoise Morvan, they take in human children but do not abandon changelings. Philippe Le Stum cites the tale of La Houle de Chêlin, where a child is exchanged by these fairies. Houles fairies often and easily volunteer to become godmothers to unborn children, and treat adopted human children with as much consideration as their own. Life with them is said to be so pleasant that seven years seem like seven months, and "twenty years seem like one day".

Depending on where they live, the houles fairies speak different languages. Those on the north coasts of Upper Brittany and Guernsey are said to speak "coastal Gallo", while the Normandy houles fairies speak "city French". They are able to read and write, and can use this mode of communication to exchange with humans.

== Location ==
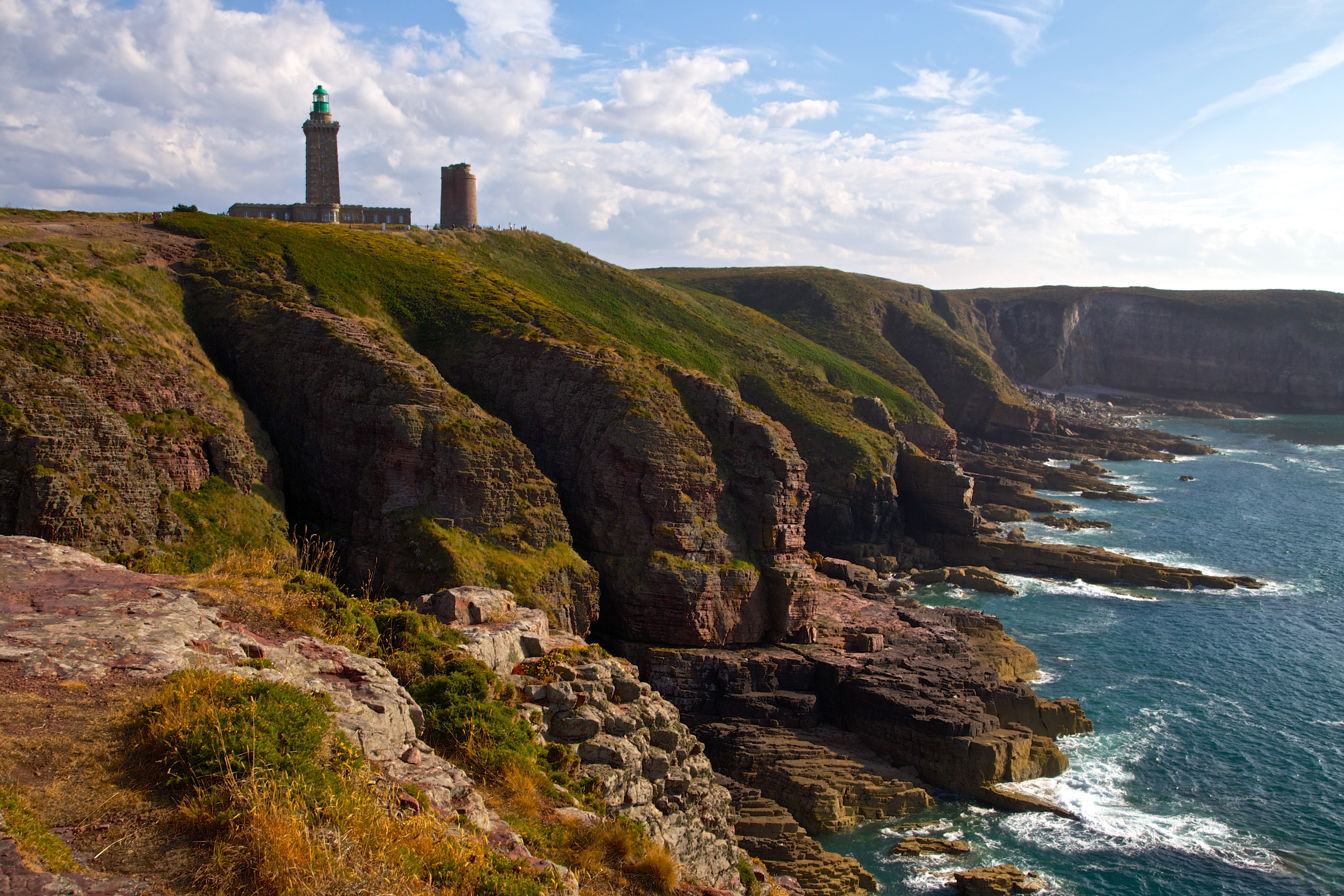
Stories of houles fairies unfold on the cliffs of Cap Fréhel.

Paul Sébillot lists numerous houles to which popular folklore associates two or three legends involving these fairies: in Cancale, Saint-Briac, Saint-Jacut (Houle Causseul), Saint-Cast, Étables (houle Notre-Dame), Cap Fréhel, and a dozen in the commune of Plévenon. He describes one in Erquy which, instead of "houle", is called "Goule de Galimoux". The Saint-Énogat grotto, well known to Dinard bathers in his day, is also called the "Goule-ès-Fées". The island of Guernsey also has its houles and fairies. Houles are not permanent habitats for fairies: there are stories of houles collapsing or being dug out by the fairies themselves.

The location of houles fairies, from the coast of Cancale to that of Tréveneuc, is known with great precision. Paul Sébillot has commissioned other folklorists to find similar tales in neighboring regions. Lower Brittany knows no houles fairies, attributing coastal caves to korrigans. In Normandy, very few legends recall these creatures, with one tradition attributing fairy-like inhabitants to the houles, known as "fairy holes".

On the other hand, very similar tales have been collected on the island of Guernsey, where a Creux-des-Fées lined with mica makes it shine like gold. Edgar MacCulloch sees this as the origin of the legend that fairies possess great wealth and go out dancing at night when the moon is full.

== Collected stories and legends ==
Sébillot lists around fifty tales or fragments of legends involving the inhabitants of the houles. He refers to the fairy tales of the houles as "the most curious and peculiar [...] of all those told in the Gallot country". The first fairy tale he collected in his career was "La Houle Cosseu", entrusted to him in 1866 by Anselme Carré, son of a fisherman from Saint-Jacut-de-la-Mer, whom he had met at the college in Dinan. A few years later, he collected Auguste Lemoine's tale of the "Goule-ès-fées", published in Littérature orale de la Haute-Bretagne with many patois words following its version told in "dialecte gallo de la côte".

A popular legend from Plévenon recounts that the houles fairies of Cap Fréhel washed their clothes at the Gaulehen pond, in the middle of the arid moor. They spread their linen, the whitest you'd ever see, over the surrounding lawns. Anyone who could get there without batting an eyelid would be allowed to take them; but no one who tried could succeed. As soon as they moved their eyelids, the linen became invisible. The fairies of the Teignouse houle, in Plévenon, had an ox grazing on the moor; one day, it strayed from the moor and passed through the wheat, causing damage. The farmers who had been wronged complained to the fairies, who compensated them by giving them a nice slice of bread, warning them never to give it to a stranger. The bread lasted two years and then disappeared, because a piece had been cut off for a beggar. According to the tale "L'école des fées", the Corbière houle in Saint-Cast was home to fairies who taught their children at school. One day, the eldest (human) child of a neighboring family heard the fairy wake up her own children to go to school, and asked her to do the same with the other siblings. These human children were taught the art of using wands and seeing illusions. A story collected on the island of Guernsey tells of a ploughman who tried to take the fairy cake uninvited, and was punished for doing so.

In Plévenon, there's also a tale of the giant Gargantua among these Breton fairies, "Gargantua filleul de la reine des fées" ("Gargantua, godson of the fairy queen").

Collected stories
Title of the story	Year of collection	Location of collection	Storyteller
La Houle Cosseu (Cosseu Houle)	1866	Saint-Jacut-de-la-Mer	Anselme Carré
La Goule-ès-Fées (The fairies' Goule)	1867	Dinard area	Collected by Auguste Lemoine, in Gallo
La Houle de la Corbière (Corbière Houle) La Fleur du rocher (The flower of the rock)	1879 1880	Saint-Cast	Marie Chéhu
Les fées de la Corbière (The Corbière fairies)	1881	Saint-Cast	Toussainte Quémat
La Houle de Poulifée (Pouilifée Houle) La Houle de Poulie (Poulie Houle)	1879 1881	Plévenon	Scolastique Durand François Marquer
La Houle de Chêlin (Chêlin Houle)	1879	Saint-Cast	Rose Renaud
La Houle du Grouin (Grouin Houle)	1880	Saint-Cast	Rose Renaud
Les fées de Lûla (The fairies of Lûla)	1880	Saint-Cast	Rose Renaud, by Marie Renaud, who inherited it from her grandfather

=== La Houle Cosseu (Cosseu Houle) ===
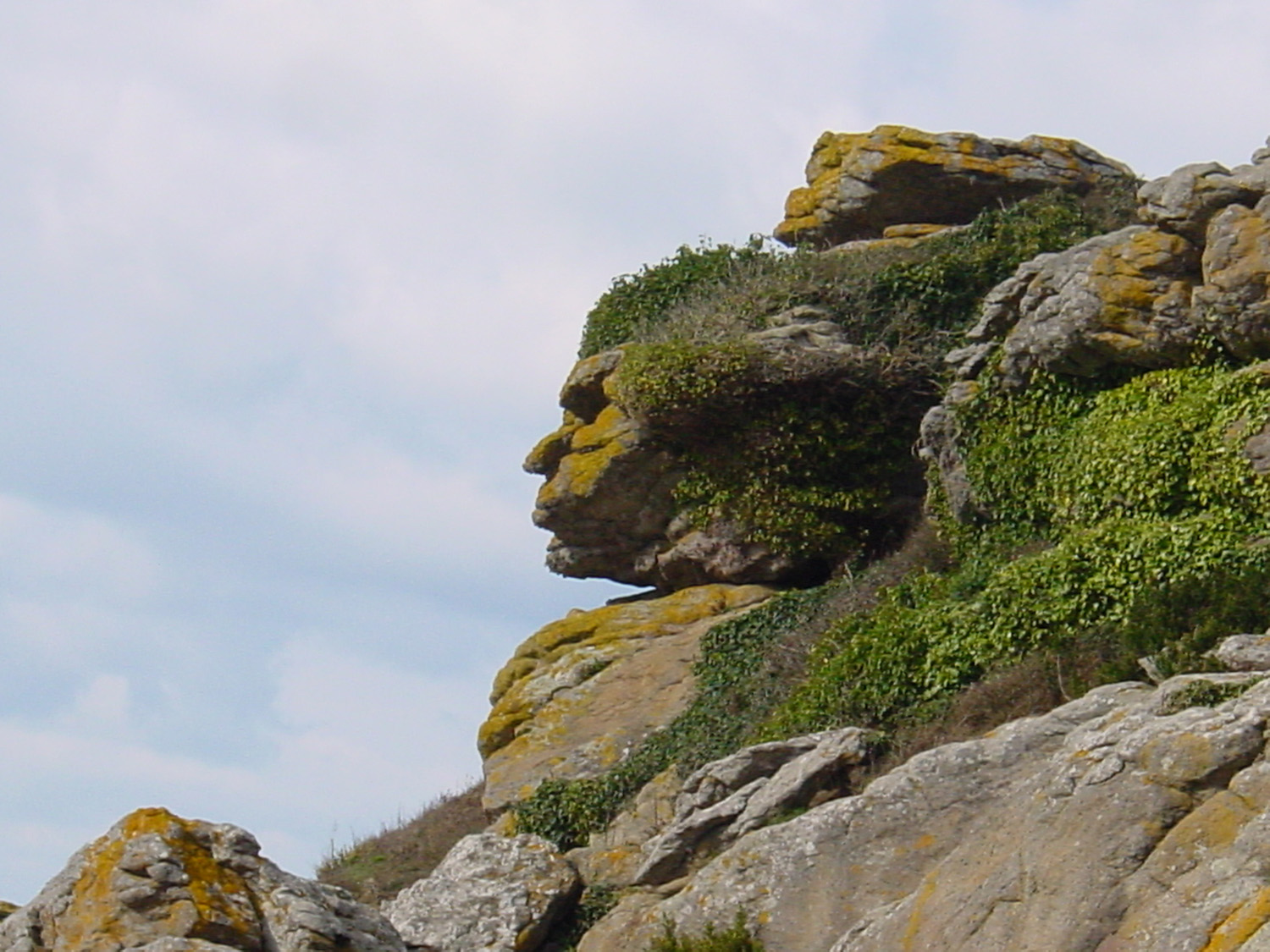
Pareidolia of a face in a rock at Saint-Jacut-de-la-Mer

Cosseu's Houle is a grotto located not far from the tip of the Saint-Jacut-de-la-Mer peninsula. One evening, at dusk, a fisherman walked along the rocks at the base of the cliffs and spotted several fairies in a cave. They rubbed their eyes with a kind of ointment, and immediately changed shape and moved away from the cave, looking like ordinary women. The fisherman hid and they passed unsuspecting. He went to the supposedly haunted cave and found a remnant of the ointment. He put some around his left eye. From then on, he recognized fairies in all their disguises (Note: This clairvoyant ointment is a frequent motif in fairy tales. See Sébillot 2002, p. 445 and article Fairy.) and protected himself from their tricks, which included begging humans for bread, casting spells on houses, confusing fishing lines and telling fortunes as gypsies. On his way to a fair, he suspected that the fairies were worried about someone recognizing them. As he passed a hut where several fairies were parading on a stage, they looked at him with irritation and, quick as an arrow, one of the fairies poked him in the left eye with the wand in her hand.

For Françoise Morvan, this tale blends certain features of the korrigans with those of the houles fairies, in particular their bohemian disguises. However, they retain the powers commonly attributed to these fairies.

=== La Goule-ès-Fées (The fairies' Houle) ===
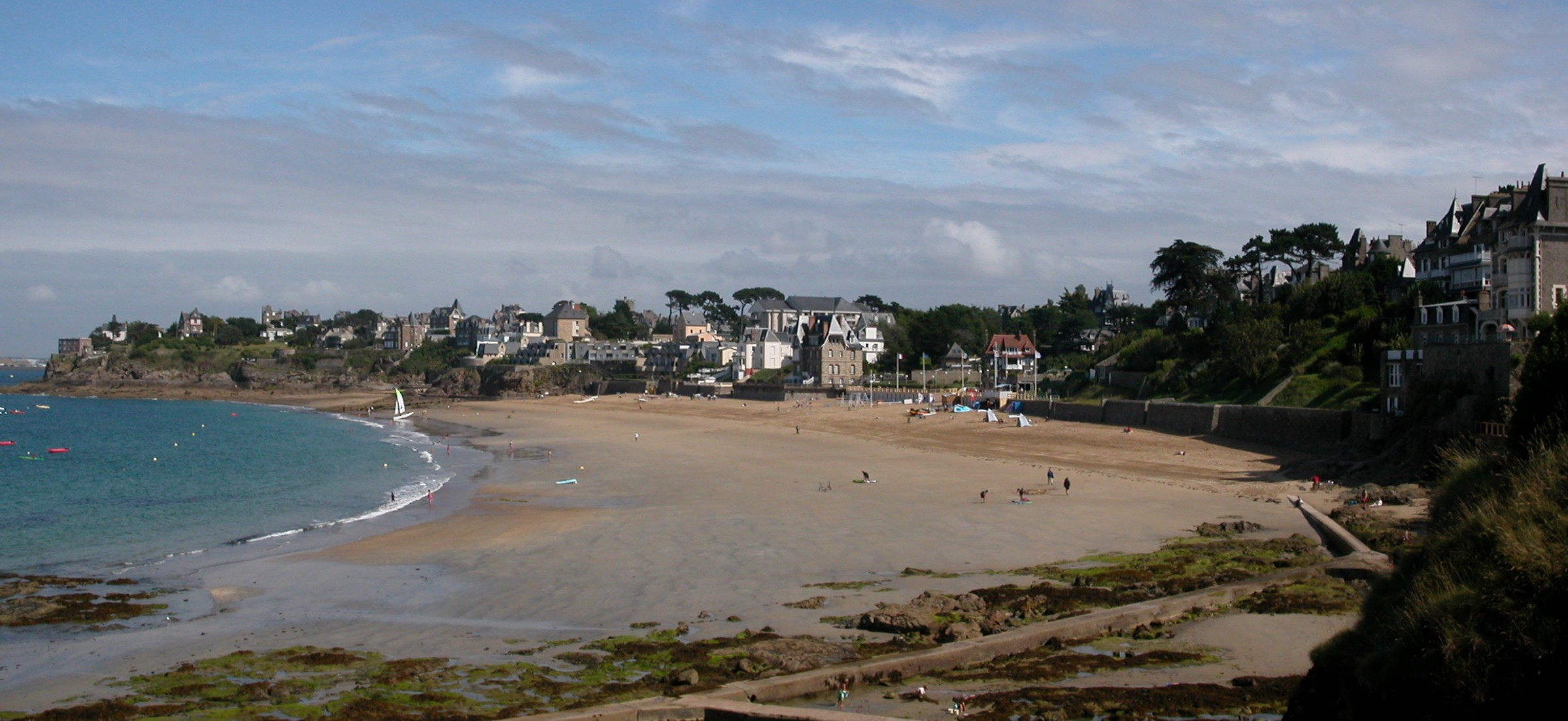
Saint Enogat beach, where the Fairies' Houle is located

One midwinter evening, Mother Milie, a midwife, let an old woman into her home, asking for help with childbirth. She followed her to the Goule-ès-Fées, which revealed the old woman's nature. In this immense cave, a beautiful young woman was the object of all attention. She gave birth to a chubby child. The fairies gave Milie an ointment made from pig fat and told her to rub it on the child, advising her to wipe her hands thoroughly afterwards, lest harm befall her. While taking care of the newborn, Milie scratched her eye. She realized that the wretched grotto was as beautiful as a church, and that the fairies were dressed like princesses. Along with the fairies, Fions no bigger than an inch were present. She said nothing of her discovery and announced that she was finished. The fairies rewarded her with a silver purse. Milie could now see the fairies and often spotted them on her travels. She hid the fact until one day she spotted a fairy stealing by putting her hand in a woman's apron in the market. She shouted "to the thief", but the fairy turned around and plucked out her eye, so that Milie became one-eyed.

This tale was collected and written in Gallo by Paul Sébillot, who points out his desire to respect the original language in which he collected it, and notes that storytellers don't usually use this dialect for storytelling, which is why this tale forms his only collection in Gallo. Françoise Morvan comments on it, noting the motif of the ointment that makes one clairvoyant, present in many other tales and legends since the Middle Ages.

Another tale linked to this place tells of a fisherman irresistibly attracted by a woman dressed in white, one foggy autumn evening. His boat broke up in the Goule-ès-Fées and he lost consciousness. The next day, he awoke to a brand-new boat full of fishing gear, moored to a large rock at the entrance to the Goule-ès-Fées.

=== La Houle de la Corbière (Corbière Houle) ===
Several tales have been told about the Corbière houle in Saint-Cast-le-Guildo. Agnès, who lived above the houle, often heard the sound of a spinning wheel, a rooster crowing, children crying, or the pestle of a churn coming from under her house. But she didn't worry, as fairies were reputed to be benevolent. One day, Agnès' child fell ill. A fairy gave a remedy by passing her hand through the stones of the fireplace and advised Agnès to "keep the bottle carefully". This saved the child, but Agnès told her neighbors, lending the bottle to those with sick children, so much so that one of them ended up breaking it. When her husband fell ill, Agnès begged the fairy who lived under her chimney to give her a new remedy. The fairy warned her that this was the last remedy, and that she was not to tell anyone about it. She later asked the fairies for help in finding her lost cow and two sheep, and the fairies helped her find three much more beautiful animals. One evening, when she had nothing left to feed her child, she asked the fairies for a loaf of bread, which had the property of never diminishing. (Note: Fairy bread, which never diminishes, is also a recurring motif in many fairy tales. See article Fairy.) A hand dropped a loaf of bread that never diminished for the child, with instructions not to give it to anyone but his parents. One evening, ten years later, Agnès' husband came home with one of his friends, to whom he cut a piece of fairy bread. But immediately the bread disappeared. Agnès and her children repeatedly beg the fairies for another loaf, but their prayers simply fell on deaf ears.

The tale of Bonhomme Mignette, which is quite similar, tells of a man with a foot injury who saw a fairy enter his home to heal him and give him an unwearable shirt. Happily, he later came across some ploughmen, one of whom had asked them for a loaf of bread without politeness, which turned out to be inedible. He politely requested the same and was gratified by a succulent one, which he shared. A woman who had heard about the fairies went to the houle and admired their weaving and singing. The fairy who cured Mignette asked the woman to find him, and gave her a loaf of bread that never runs out and a baguette as a reward, with instructions never to speak of it. When Mignette went to the houle, the fairy asked him to marry her. He accepted, but since he was old and baptized, the fairies performed a ritual by baking him in the oven to reduce him to ash and knead him, making him young and beautiful. From then on, he lived happily ever after with the fairy.

Paul Sébillot quotes another tale, of which he was only able to obtain a summary. One of the fairies who inhabited this houle fell in love with one of the soldiers guarding the Corbière Redoubt. She followed her lover into the army during the wars of the Revolution. While they were together, the soldier rose in rank and was victorious without injury. But when the fairy abandoned him, his luck ran out and he was wounded, losing every battle in which he was involved.

=== La Houle de Poulifée (Pouilifée Houle) ===
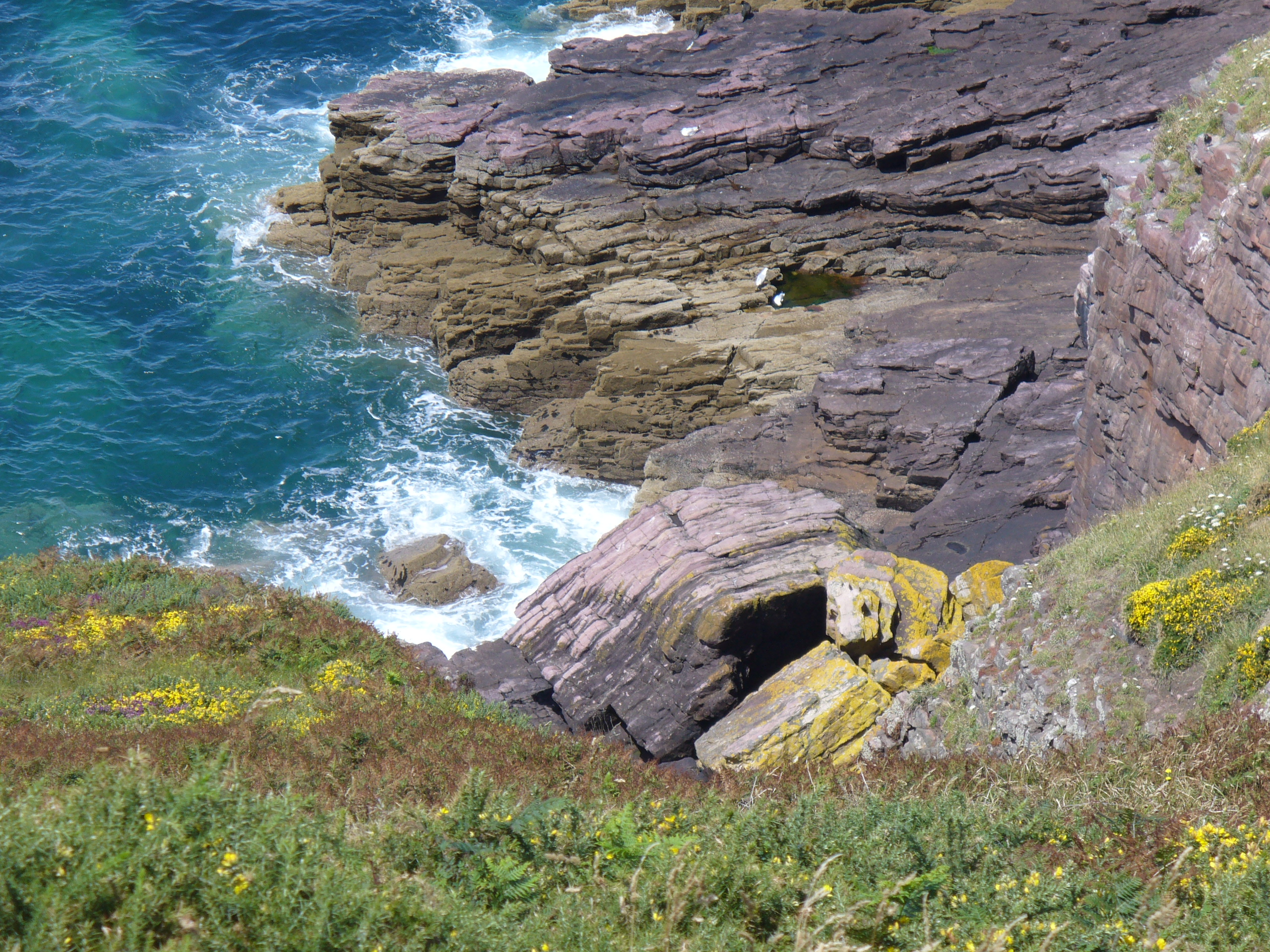
A houle on the cliffs of Cap Fréhel near Plévenon

The Poulifée Houle is reputed to be Plévenon's largest and most beautiful houle. A group of young men from the village entered it and discovered that it was inhabited. Two ladies invited them to dinner, where they ate all sorts of delicacies. When the meal was over, the ladies offered to come back another time. The people of Plévenon heard the news and often came to meet the two fairies, who asked them about their professions, advised them and gave them bread and meat. One man told them he was a father, and how difficult it was to feed his family. A fairy gave him money and told him to come back when his wife was pregnant again. When he returned to the swell, one of the fairies asked him if she could become the child's godmother. Back at home, the husband told his wife, who refused to give her child to the fairies. The ladies of the cave, angered by this refusal, took away all the gifts they had given. The family went back to being poor as before. Another tale, "La Houle de Poulie", recounts the fate of the fourteen sons of a woman from Plévenon, la Mère-aux-quatorze. She entrusted seven of her sons to the fairies of Poulifée, and the other seven joined them after the woman's death. Under the care of the fairies, these children became intelligent (they had been born simple-minded) and learned to change into "all sorts of beasts". One day, they transformed into rabbits for a walk on the moor, but a hunter shot them all.

A conflict leads to the death of many of the houles fairies. A rivalry was born between the houles fairies of Château-Serin and those of Poulifée. Jean, a child from Plévenon, became godson to a fairy from Poulifée, so that another fairy from Château-Serin agreed to kill him before he turned eighteen. The fairy godmother managed to save the child by locking him up in the Crémus houle, which she dug for him in a cliff at Fréhel. There, he reached the age of twenty, beyond which the other fairies no longer had the power to harm him. Jean learnt the secret to end with the fairies' immortality: all it took was for their lips to come into contact with salt. He was told never to use it, but Jean took revenge on the Château-Serin fairy who had tried to kill him by pouring a packet of salt into his mouth. Immediately, all the fairies disappeared from the land of Plévenon. They abandoned their houle, leaving their treasure in the care of a dwarf and a rooster.

=== La Houle du Grouin (Grouin Houle) ===
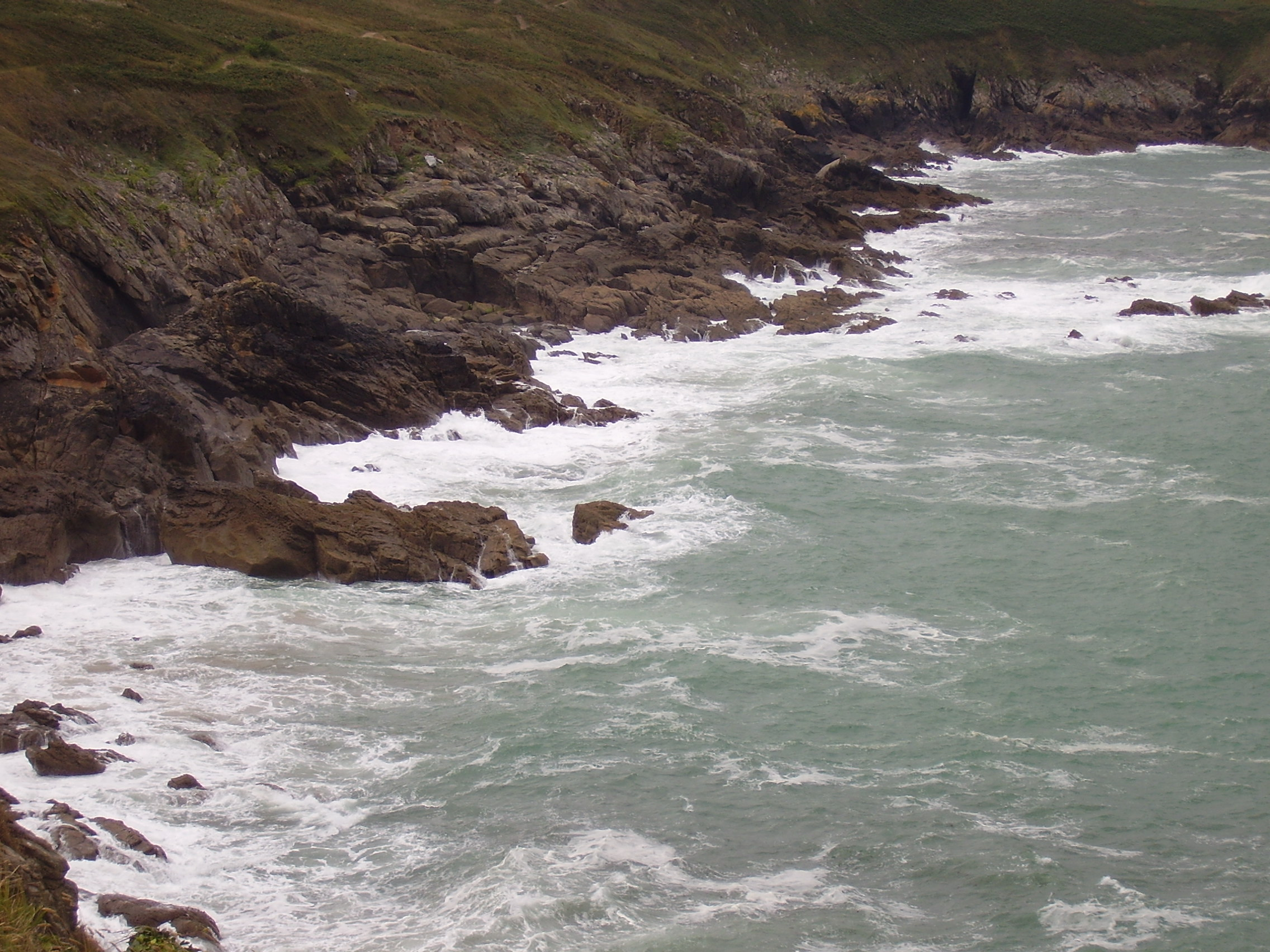
Pointe du Grouin, Cancale

The Grouin houle (on the Pointe du Grouin in Cancale) is inhabited by evil fairies who steal human goods and cause damage. One day, a farmer tending her cows saw a stranger approaching and asking her for some milk. Unaware that she was a fairy, she refused her request, saying that her cows would be milked at the usual time. The fairy cursed her, and the cows stopped giving milk. She sold them to buy new ones, but didn't succeed. The fairies then borrowed her donkey to ride for eight days straight, and the animal "became a sorcerer" by frequenting them, getting into the habit of bewitching people who hit it. Fairies also made the sheep grow horns and put horns on their ewes, so that their owners no longer recognized them. They shorn the sheep and the wool grew back in eight days. To appease the fairies, the farmers offered them butter. They lifted the spell.

The tale of "Le roué de mer et la fée" recounts the curse of a fisherman who ignored the Grouin fairies' warning him not to raise his nets. To punish him, the fairies turned him into a fish, the "roué de mer". The Grouin houle fairies are said to have disappeared after a landslide destroyed their cave.

=== Les fées de Lûla (The fairies of Lûla) ===
The Lûla grotto, in the Bay of Saint-Cast, is close to an oyster farm. Its owner realized that he was regularly robbed of oysters and lobster, so he suspected of fairies and male fairies and decided to stand guard. Discovering that his thieves were invisible, he fired a shotgun. When the fairy laughed at this attempt, he cursed her. The fairy told him not to curse, and promised to return the oysters to the farm the next day. The next day, he found his farm full of oysters. Happy, he returned eight days later and told the fairies to take whatever they wanted. The fairies appeared and said they'd keep the farm, so he wouldn't have to worry about it. They also told him that if he had a request, all he had to do was write it down on a piece of paper and leave it at the entrance to the houle.

One day, a ploughman saw smoke coming out of the ground as he turned over the fertile soil he had just worked. A voice told him not to dig any deeper, for if he destroyed the fairies' house, they would destroy his own. He replied that he meant them no harm, and the fairy offered him a gift so he wouldn't have to dig any deeper. He asked for a hook and a spade that could work on their own, which he got. The tools served their purpose perfectly until they became too worn and had to be taken to the blacksmith. From then on, they lost their enchantment. The farmer tried in vain to find the fairies and ask them for new tools, only to learn that they only came out at night. He went to their houle, which was guarded by a male fairy, who advised him to return later with a black cat and a rooster to present to the fairies. The fairy was delighted with the gift, and offered him tools that would work on their own without wearing out, as well as a ship capable of sailing to or under the sea. His wife asked for clothes and bread for her children, and she got clothes that don't wear out and bread that never wears out. The fairy asked the ploughman and his wife never to show the boat to anyone, and then announced that this was the last service their people would perform for humans, before their final departure.

== Analysis ==
Houles fairies share many of the characteristics attributed to fairies more generally. The tales associated with them involve a form of wisdom: those who wish to take advantage of the fairies, or who are insincere towards them, are punished; those who ask them a favor without ulterior motive, or who marvel at them, are rewarded. Similarly, the "bad" fairies of the houles have, according to Morvan, the essential characteristic of acting with a purpose they keep secret, unlike the beneficent fairies who act without ulterior motive. The children in the fairy tale L'école des fées, who are given the magic ointment that enables them to see enchantments by the fairies themselves, are never punished, unlike the adults who stole it. For Morvan, "the gifts of these fairies return like a reflection in a mirror, before you can foresee what would be in your image". The theme of their disappearance is also highly symbolic (even alchemical), as the fairies of the Poulifée houle killed by salt, rather solar creatures, leave their former home in the care of a dwarf, a typical chthonian creature, and a rooster symbolizing the inferno ready to be reborn.

== Evolution of beliefs ==
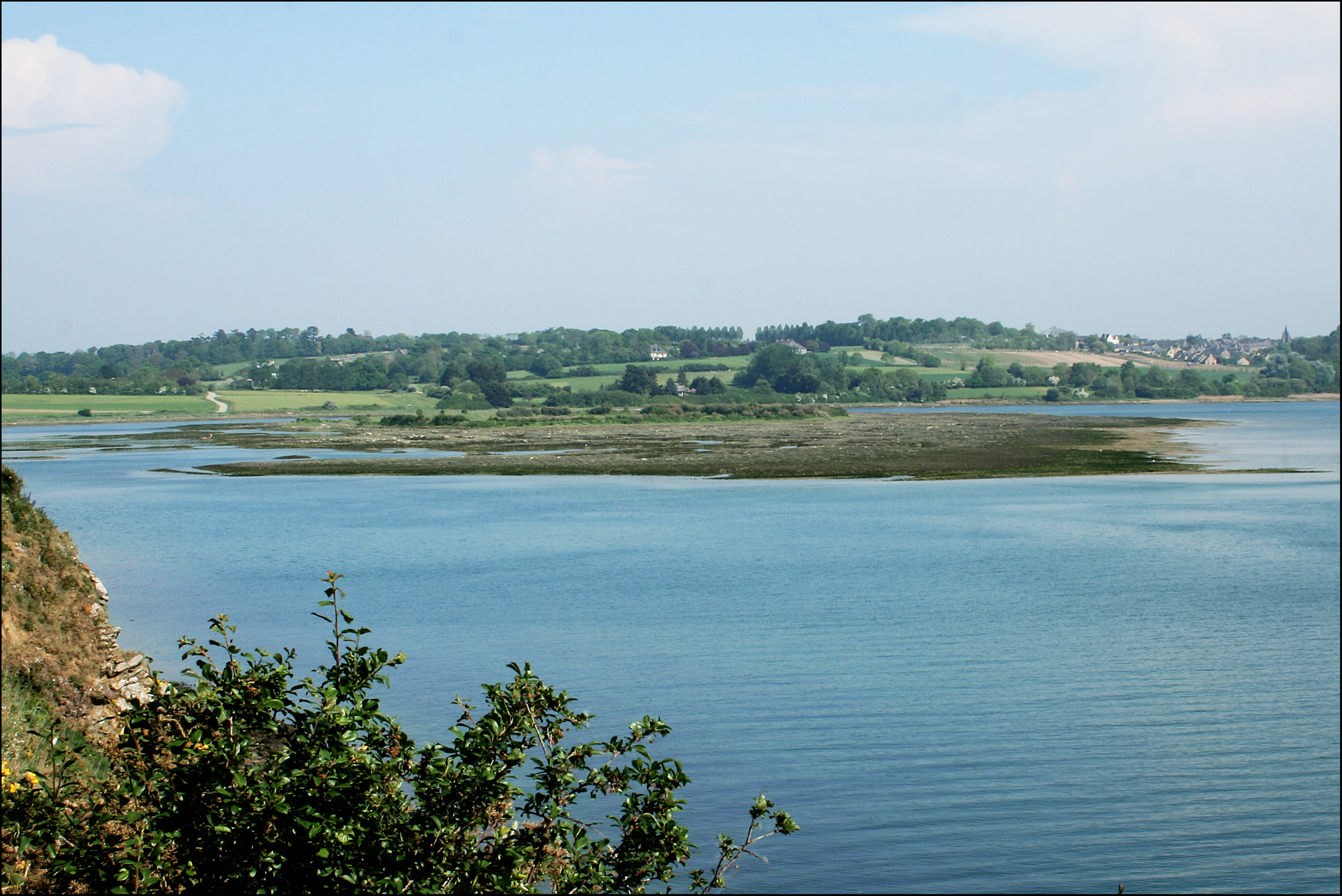
The houles fairy reputed to live on the banks of the Rance at Saint-Suliac is said to have been exorcised.

It's difficult to know the exact origin of the tales of the houles fairies. Roger Sherman Loomis postulates a kinship between the fairies of Haute-Bretagne and the Morgain of the Arthurian romances, thanks to the existence of numerous tales around Margot the fairy. Philippe Le Stum evokes the ancestry of the Parcae, ancient goddesses presiding over destiny, due to the relationships maintained by these fairies with the nobility, and their habit of becoming godmothers to children. According to Sébillot and Edgar Mac Culloch, Bailiff of Guernsey at the end of the 19th century, beliefs linked to the houles may have been deliberately peddled and nurtured by smugglers who stored their wares in these caves. Whatever the case, according to Richard Ely and Amélie Tsaag Valren, "Brittany feared [these fairies] as much as it loved them". Belief was still strong in Upper Brittany at the end of the 19th century, especially among older women born in the 18th century, many of whom believed that fairies really did exist. According to several storytellers who confided their stories to Sébillot in the 1880s, their grandfathers had known the houles fairies. The elders of the time claim to have shared the dances and rounds of these fairies, or to have heard them sing. Sébillot also points out that belief in fairies declined sharply at the beginning of the 20th century, particularly with the creation of a seaside resort in the Bay of Saint-Malo. Many believe that fairies disappeared during the 19th century, considered the "invisible century". Some tales hold out the hope of a possible return of the Houles fairies "in visible times", i.e. in the following century (the 20th century). This belief persisted to such an extent that, in 1900, some peasants mistook ladies passing by in their cars for fairies returning to their homeland.

The houles fairies seem to have been the object of real veneration. In Saint-Suliac, the cave known as "l'antre de la Fée du Bec du Puy", on the banks of the Rance, is said to have sheltered a houle fairy capable of calming the wind and the sea: she would emerge from her cave in the evening, first as an indistinct white vapor, then taking on the form of a beautiful woman in rainbow-colored clothes. Sailors going out fishing used to pay homage to her by laying flowers at the entrance to her grotto. The parish priest of Saint-Suliac came to exorcise the creature, who is said to have "lost all power". The case of this fairy is, however, somewhat unusual compared to other tales of houles fairies, as the creature seems to fall somewhere between the latter and characters such as Marie Morgen and the lavandières.

A number of tales evoke the disappearance of these fairies, including that of the houle Lûla and those of the houle Saint-Michel in Erquy and the houle du Châtelet, where the fairies said they were leaving "to another country". Others were killed when their houle collapsed. A "man of the sea" is said to have stayed in the Poulifée houle, then in the Teignouse houle, before leaving, taking all the houle's inhabitants with him to England. The reasons given for these departures are certainly linked to the influence of the Church and school education, an explanation reinforced by the fact that the immortality of these fairies was lost with the salt of baptism, a reminder of the retreat of pagan divinities in the face of Christianity.

== See also ==
- Fairy
- Houle (geomorphology)
- Fions
- Jetins
- Margot the fairy

== Bibliography ==
- Ely, Richard; Tsaag Valren, Amélie (25 October 2013). Bestiaire fantastique & créatures féeriques de France (in French). Dinan: Terre de Brume. p. 123-124. ISBN 978-2-84362-508-4.
- Gaignard, Henri-Georges (1983). Visages de Rance : flâneries à travers les pays malouin et dinannais (in French). Fernand Lanore.
- Le Stum, Philippe (2003). Fées, Korrigans & autres créatures fantastiques de Bretagne (in French). Rennes: Ouest-France. ISBN 2-7373-2369-X.
- Morvan, Françoise (1998). "Les fées des houles et la seraine". In José Corti (ed.). Trois fées des mers. J. Corti. ISBN 2-7143-0657-8.
- Morvan, Françoise (1999). La douce vie des fées des eaux (in French). Arles: Actes Sud. ISBN 2-7427-2406-0.
- Ruaud, André-François (2010). "Sables & Houles (Fées des)". In Les moutons électriques (ed.). Le Dico féérique: Le Règne humanoïde (in French). Moutons électriques (Les). ISBN 978-2361830304.
- Sébillot, Paul (1881). Littérature orale de la Haute-Bretagne (in French). Maisonneuve.
- Sébillot, Paul (1882). Traditions et superstitions de la Haute-Bretagne. Littératures populaires de toutes les nations (in French). Vol. 1. Maisonneuve.
- Sébillot, Paul (August 2002) [1904]. Croyances, mythes et légendes des pays de France (in French). Paris: Omnibus. ISBN 2-258-05989-5.
- Sébillot, Paul; Morvan, Françoise (2008). Fées des houles, sirènes et rois de mer (in French). Rennes: éditions Ouest-France. ISBN 978-2-7373-4569-2.

=== Folk tales from Upper Brittany ===
In three volumes. First published by Charpentier, reissued by Terre de Brume.

- Sébillot, Paul (1880). Contes populaires de la Haute-Bretagne (in French). Vol. I. Paris: Charpentier.
- Sébillot, Paul (1881). Contes populaires de la Haute-Bretagne: Contes des paysans et des pêcheurs (in French). Vol. II. Paris: Charpentier.
- Sébillot, Paul (1882). Contes populaires de la Haute-Bretagne: Contes des marins (in French). Vol. III. Paris: Charpentier.
- Sébillot, Paul; Besançon, Dominique (1998). Contes populaires de la Haute-Bretagne: Contes merveilleux. Bibliothèque celte (in French). Vol. I. Rennes: Terre de brume. ISBN 2-84362-036-8.
- Sébillot, Paul; Besançon, Dominique (20 June 1999). Contes populaires de la Haute-Bretagne: Contes des paysans et des pêcheurs. Bibliothèque celte (in French). Vol. II. Rennes: Terre de brume. ISBN 2-84362-050-3.
- Sébillot, Paul; Besançon, Dominique (2000). Contes populaires de la Haute-Bretagne: Contes des marins. Bibliothèque celte (in French). Vol. III. Rennes: Terre de brume. ISBN 2-84362-088-0.

=== Articles ===
- Sébillot, Paul (1886). "Légendes locales de la Haute-Bretagne". Bulletin de la Société Archéologique du Finistère (in French). 13: 206–228, 331–338.
- MacCulloch, Edgar (1889). "Le folklore de Guernesey". Revue des traditions populaires (in French). 4.
- "Fées des Houles en Haute-Bretagne". La France Pittoresque (in French) (24). Fall 2007.
