= Houle (geomorphology) =

Name given to coastal cavities in Breton Folklore

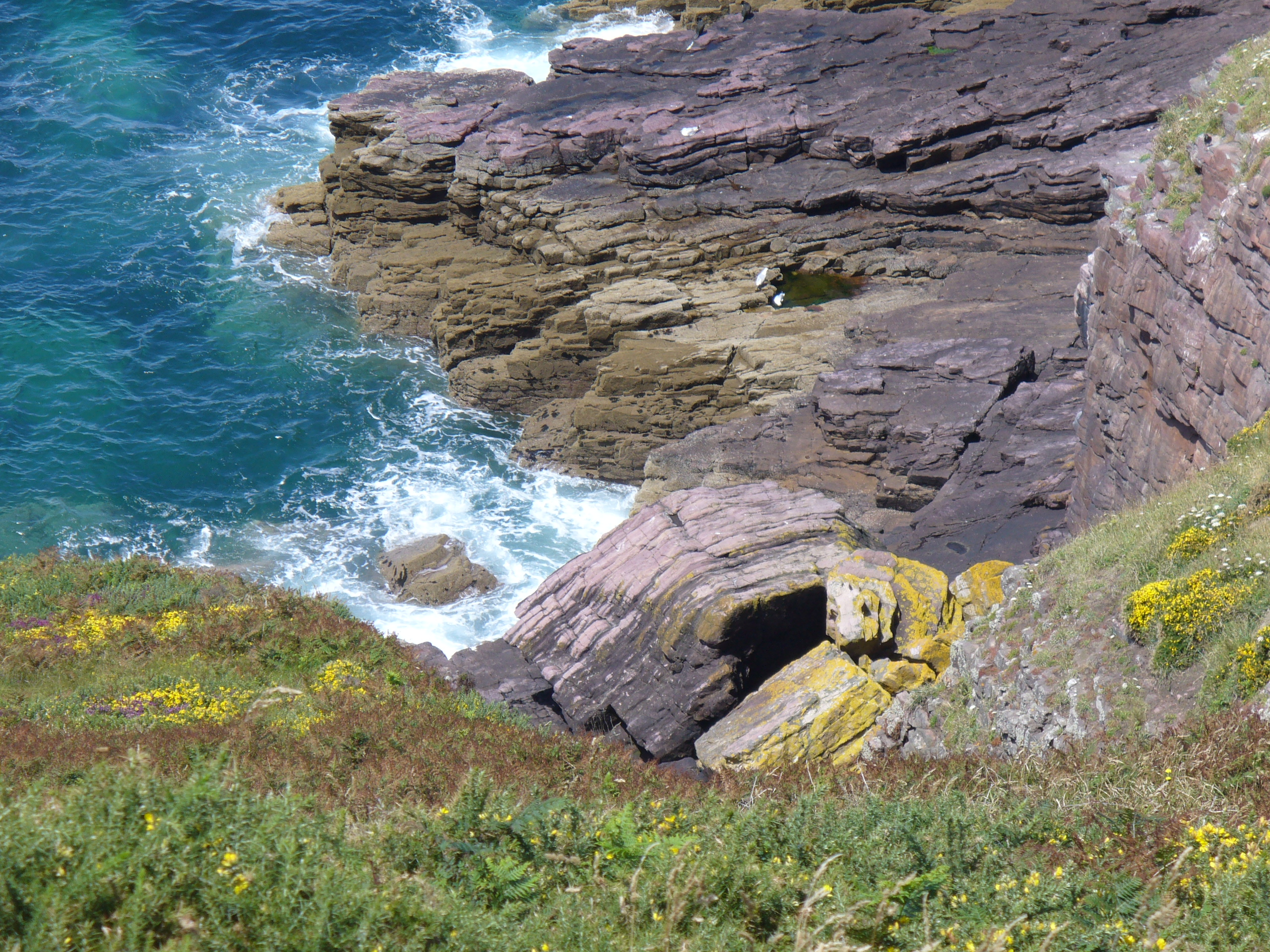
Legends of the houles fairies depict them as living in families and caves, like those on the cliffs of Cap Fréhel.

Houle, or more rarely goule, is the name given to cavities, particularly in rocks by the sea or in river banks, and to caves and grottos in the cliffs of the Normandy coast, the Channel Islands and the north coast of Upper Brittany. An important folklore is associated with these places, due to the supposed presence of the Houles fairies, Fions and Jetins.

== Etymology ==
Originally a Norman word, it has also spread to neighboring regions, as can be seen in the various dictionaries relating to this dialect. According to Joret, in his Dictionnaire du patois du Bessin, hōle, houōle has the meaning of "hollow where fish hide", then for Jean Fleury in Patois de la Hague, it means "a hole, a cave, especially in rocks". In Maze, Dictionnaire du patois du Havre, the term has the meaning of "cavity where fish retreat" found in various dictionaries dealing with the Normandy dialect. According to Charles Joret in his Dictionnaire du patois du Bessin, hōle, houōle has "the meaning of a hollow where fish hide", then for Fleury in Patois de la Hague, it means "a hole, a cavern, especially in rocks". In Maze, Dictionnaire du patois du Havre, the term means "a cavity where fish retreat".

Other forms include huole and hul. The Norman word comes from the Old Scandinavian hol, meaning "cavity", and is perpetuated in modern Scandinavian languages: Norwegian dialectal hol, Swedish hål and Danish hul.

The meaning of houle as "undulatory movement of the sea" wasn't attested until the 15th century, and then only in the 18th century as "waves that the sea pushes against each other".

The Norman dialect has many derivatives: ahouolo "to stay" (referring to fish) in rock cavities (La Hague), houlet "spider crab", "crab" (Cotentin, Pays de Caux), houlin "spider crab" (western Cotentin) and crab de houle (Pays de Caux).

This word may have been confused with Old Norse hola "hole (in the earth)" (cf. Norwegian hola "hole"), which shares the same root hol-. It has also given rise to houle, for example in the Guernes dialect, and especially its -ette derivative: houlette, meaning "burrow" in various Norman dialects. There are also numerous French derivatives like se houler (in French) "to get excited at the entrance to a burrow (speaking of rabbits)", se déhouler (in French) "to get out of one's bed or hole with difficulty" (Pays de Caux).

In Norman toponymy, the radical hol- is frequently found in compounds, but also in its romanized form with the definite article, as illustrated by the following examples le Delle-du-Houl (Calvados, Argouges), la Houle (localities in Granville, Guilberville, Écalles-Alix, les Houles (localities in Hacqueville and Saint-Aubin-de-Scellon, la Houlle (locality in Saint-Quentin-sur-le-Homme), les Houlles (localities in Roullours, Tournebu, Fresney-le-Puceux, Damville and Thiberville), etc.

There are also a few examples on the north coast of Brittany, linked to the Norman influence on Gallo: la Houle in Cancale or the port of la Houle Causseul, in Saint-Jacut.

== Description ==
Descriptions of houles emphasize the illusions that reign there, thanks to the fairy-like beings reputed to inhabit them. A houle with a tiny entrance can be home to a veritable Otherworld. This association with fairy folklore may stem from the fact that the mica that lines some of them makes them shine like gold, according to Edgar MacCulloch. The largest and most beautiful of these houles in Haute-Bretagne is said to be that of Poulifée in Plévenon, which is richly furnished and even contains a chapel. The houles are imagined to be gigantic, and the Chêlin houle is said to be fifty kilometers long, reaching as far as the town of Lamballe.

== See also ==
- Blowhole (geology)

== Bibliography ==
- Morvan, Françoise (1999). La douce vie des fées des eaux (in French). Arles: Actes Sud. ISBN 2-7427-2406-0.
- Sébillot, Paul (1881). Littérature orale de la Haute-Bretagne (in French). Maisonneuve.
