= Fions =

Mythological creatures

- Grouping: Little people
- Sub grouping: Lutin
- Similar entities: Jetins
- Folklore: Breton mythology
- First attested: Collections by Paul Sébillot
- Country: France
- Region: Brittany
- Habitat: Maritime caves and grottes named houles
- Details: Very small, battling, cavernicolous, domesticated by houles fairies

Fions are lutin-like creatures of the little people, mostly mentioned in the maritime folklore of Upper Brittany. They might be of English origin. Most of the stories about them come from Paul Sébillot's collections in the late 19th century. Characterized by their habitat in the rocks and caves of Brittany's northern shores, the Fions lead a military life in community with the houles fairies, as their servants. Organized into battalions, they are said to wage war on a golden ship. According to tales, they own and graze livestock, and sometimes give enchanted objects or food to humans. Pierre Dubois and Joann Sfar featured a Fion in the comic strip series Petrus Barbygère, in 1996 and 1997.

== Terminology, origin and gender ==
The origin of the name "Fions" is not known, and its usage remains unclear. For Walter Evans-Wentz, the term seems to have originally referred to fairies, but it can also apply to little people creatures of both sexes. Opinions differ on this point, for while Paul Sébillot says "there were no female Fions, at least in the houles", Pierre Dubois believes they are hermaphroditic creatures. Fions are credited with a habit rather peculiar to fairies in France, which is herding cattle. What's more, Fions have replaced houles fairies in many parts of Brittany. Françoise Morvan sees them as related to the Anglo-Saxon fairies, like the Jetins: the name of their caves, the houles, is taken from the English word for hole. In addition, their characteristics are in many ways reminiscent of English creatures. The Fions may represent one of the rare cases of English influence on Breton folklore, but the limited amount of information available on them limits our knowledge.

== Characteristics ==
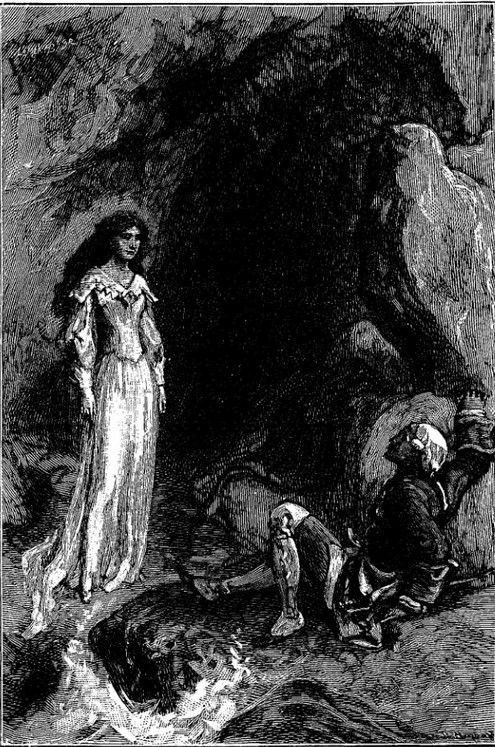
A houles fairy, reputed to share her cavernous habitat with the Fions who would serve as her servants.

Compared to the other lutins of Brittany, the Fions are clearly characterized. They can only be compared to Jetins, as they are not related to either korrigans or changelings. Nor do they belong to the same family of creatures as the houles fairies, whom they serve. They are the only lutins reputed to live with fairies, in a "state of domesticity". Their distinctly military role and their organization into battalions are also unique among lutins. In Saint-Briac, the Fions wear the garb of admirals, train in battalions of thirty and wage war on a golden ship belonging to the fairies, against the fairies of Chêlin. They sometimes (but more rarely) help the fairies weave on their spinning wheels, always in battalions, and sometimes play shuffleboard with hundred-franc coins, and train with small gold rifles.

For Françoise Morvan, the Fions are reminiscent of toy soldiers. According to a collection by Paul Sébillot, they are so small "that their swords were hardly longer than corsage pins". He attributes a height of one inch to the Fions of the houles, noting that he had no description of terrestrial Fions, also reputed to be very small. Pierre Dubois reports stories of Fions playing with children, which worried mothers because the Jetins, who are close to them, are child thieves.

== Location ==
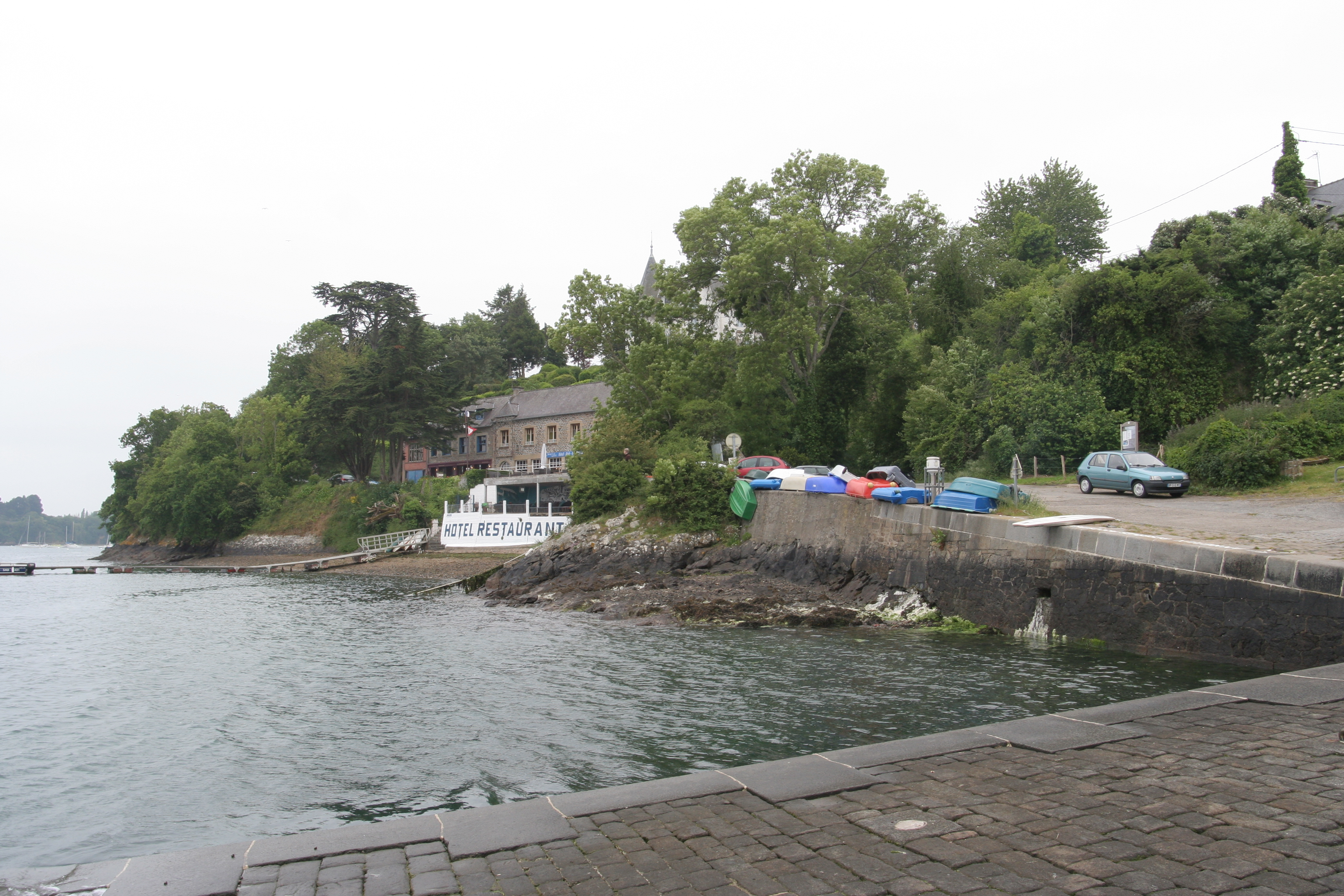
The Rance maritime at Pleurtuit. According to Paul Sébillot, the rocky caves on the banks are the domain of the Fions.

The sea caves of the north coast of Haute-Bretagne, known as "houles", are the usual domain of the Fions. The only known Breton dwarf cave is the Cache à Fions in Pleurtuit, near the Rance maritime river. Fions have been reported near Dinard, on the banks of the Rance, as well as in Saint-Briac and on the Île de Batz.

== Collected tales ==
Several tales collected by Paul Sébillot tell of the Fions. Auguste Lemoine recounts how the black cow of the Fions du Pont-aux-Hommes-Nés once ate a family's buckwheat. To the protests of the woman who owned the field and had come to their hideout, the Fions gave her a bucket of buckwheat that never ran out, warning her to give it only to her family and never to a stranger. But the woman forgot this promise, and gave buckwheat to a ragpicker. Since then, the family was never able to get any buckwheat.

The Fions, who live on the banks of the Rance in "caches" tailored to their size, possess mysterious, enchanted ovens. One day, men ploughing nearby heard them blowing a horn to call for the oven. They asked the Fions for a loaf of bread. When they reached the end of their furrow, they found the bread on a tablecloth, with knives. But one of the ploughmen put a knife in his pocket, causing the tablecloth and all it contained to disappear instantly. The tale of the fairy ship recounts a battle between the fairies of Saint-Briac and those of Chêlin. The role of the Fions was decisive, as they used their weapons to tear the Devil to pieces.

Other tales mention the Fions, although they are not the main subject. In 1881, Toussainte Quémat entrusted the tale of "La Fée de la Corbière" to Paul Sébillot, mentioning servant Fions who weaved on a distaff at the behest of the fairies.

== Popular culture ==
Pierre Dubois and Joann Sfar include a Fion in the comic strip Petrus Barbygère: the little creature appears at the start of the first album, pursued by a horde of pirates, to ask the famous elficologist for help. In La Grande Encyclopédie des lutins, Pierre Dubois recounts how, after the disappearance of the houles fairies, the Fions moved into caves in a semi-wild state. Some of them moved to the north of Ireland, where they have been terrorizing people ever since.

== See also ==
- Jetins
- Breton mythology
- Houles fairy

== Bibliography ==
- Dubois, Pierre (1992). "Fions, Jetins et Fois". In Hoëbeke (ed.). La Grande Encyclopédie des lutins. illustrated by Roland Sabatier and Claudine Sabatier. ISBN 978-2-84230-325-9.
- Ely, Richard; Tsaag Valren, Amélie (25 October 2013). Bestiaire fantastique & créatures féériques de France (in French). éditions Terre de Brume. ISBN 2843625084.
- Evans-Wentz, Walter Yeeling (1977). The fairy-faith in Celtic countries. Library of Alexandria. ISBN 1613106785.
- Morvan, Françoise (1999). La douce vie des fées des eaux (in French). Actes Sud. ISBN 2742724060.
- Morvan, Françoise (2 September 2005). Vie et mœurs des lutins bretons. Babel (in French). Actes Sud. ISBN 2742757937.
- Ruaud, André-François (2010). "Fions". In Les moutons électriques (ed.). Le Dico féérique: Le Règne humanoïde (in French). Vol. 1. ISBN 2361830302.
- Sébillot, Paul; Morvan, Françoise (2008). Fées des houles, sirènes et rois de mer (in French). éditions Ouest-France.
- Sébillot, Paul (1997). Le folklore de la mer (in French). Ancre de Marine Editions. ISBN 284141115X.
- Sébillot, Paul (August 2002) [1904]. Croyances, mythes et légendes des pays de France (in French). Paris: Omnibus. ISBN 2258059895.
