= Margot the fairy =

Creature information
- Grouping: Folklore
- Sub grouping: Fairy
- Similar entities: Swell fairy

Origin
- Region: Especially Brittany

Margot the fairy is, in the traditions of Brittany and the Mayenne, the generic name for certain earthly fairies. They are best known in Central Brittany, particularly in the Côtes-d'Armor. Presumably descended from the fairy Morgana and before her from an aspect of Mother Earth, the Margot fairies are quite powerful. They can make themselves invisible, metamorphose and transform others. Reputed to be excellent dancers, often generous and sometimes cruel, they take pleasure in testing humans by giving them gold and objects. They are believed to have built several monuments, and to possess immense treasures hidden under the earth. They have animals, often cattle.

Tales and myths tell of the habits of these fairies, who kidnap human children to replace them with their own and become the godmothers of babies whom they name and cover with more or less convenient gifts. They reward the righteous and punish those who harm them, are greedy or indiscreet towards them. They sometimes show themselves to be thieves. A number of megaliths and rocks are said to be the homes of these fairies, or their furniture and tools: table, spindle, room, shoe, armchair, cradle... They were the object of cults and beliefs, in particular at the Margot cave. These beliefs, until the end of the 19th century, led many people to offer them animals in sacrifice and to search for their supposed treasures.

== Terminology ==
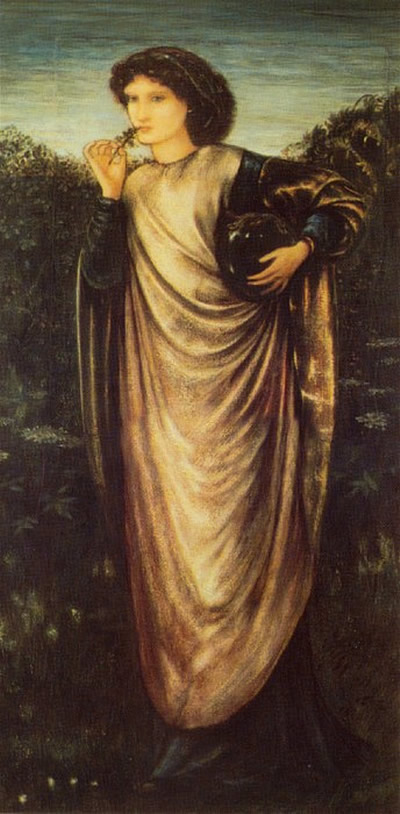
The fairy Morgan is closely related to the Margots, both in name and ability. Morgan le Fay, seen by Edward Burne-Jones (1862).

"Margot the fairy" is not a proper noun for a particular fairy. It is rather a generic term for a group of fairies, a "class" of creatures not always differentiated from other fairies, except by their language. The name probably comes from a distortion of the name of Morgana, the famous fairy of the Arthurian myth. They were originally called "Morgana" in Lower Brittany. Roger Sherman Loomis sees a relationship between the fairies of Upper Brittany and the "Morgain" of the Arthurian romances. Towards the Mené, in the cantons of Collinée and Moncontour, they are called "Margot the fairy", or " my friend Margot", or " the good woman Margot". The name Margot the fairy is used in many parts of the Côtes-d'Armor, mainly in the districts of Saint-Brieuc and Loudéac. It exists in the singular as well as in the plural ("the Margot fairies"). In Bécherel, there is mention of "Morgant fairies", a name quite similar to Margot and Morgane. According to Paul-Yves Sébillot, Central Brittany is the only part of Brittany where fairies have a particular name.

== Characteristics ==
External image
- Margot the fairy seen by the Breton illustrator Pascal Moguérou.

According to Paul Sébillot, the Margots are very close to the swell fairies, with whom they share many characteristics, and almost as many as the latter. However, Françoise Morvan makes a point of differentiating them. He also likens them to the Lorraine land fairies, the Berrichonnes fairies, and especially the Basque Laminak. They can be found in various natural places such as mounds, caves, moors and rocks. They are essentially terrestrial fairies, often inhabiting "fairy rocks" and large blocks. The fairy of Cas Margot, near Moncontour, is said to live in a swell in which "the dogs have never wanted to enter". She is said to have an iron arm and a steel one. Paul Sébillot describes them as "beautiful people" dressed in splendid clothes, although some are ugly, wrinkled and wear old clothes. Pierre Dubois describes them as rustic, florid, round and jovial fairies. Some stories mention their giving birth (usually to girls), but there is never any mention of men or males in their entourage. Their habitat is less luxurious than that of the swell fairies, which consists of a real Otherworld. Usually, they are rather large burrows.

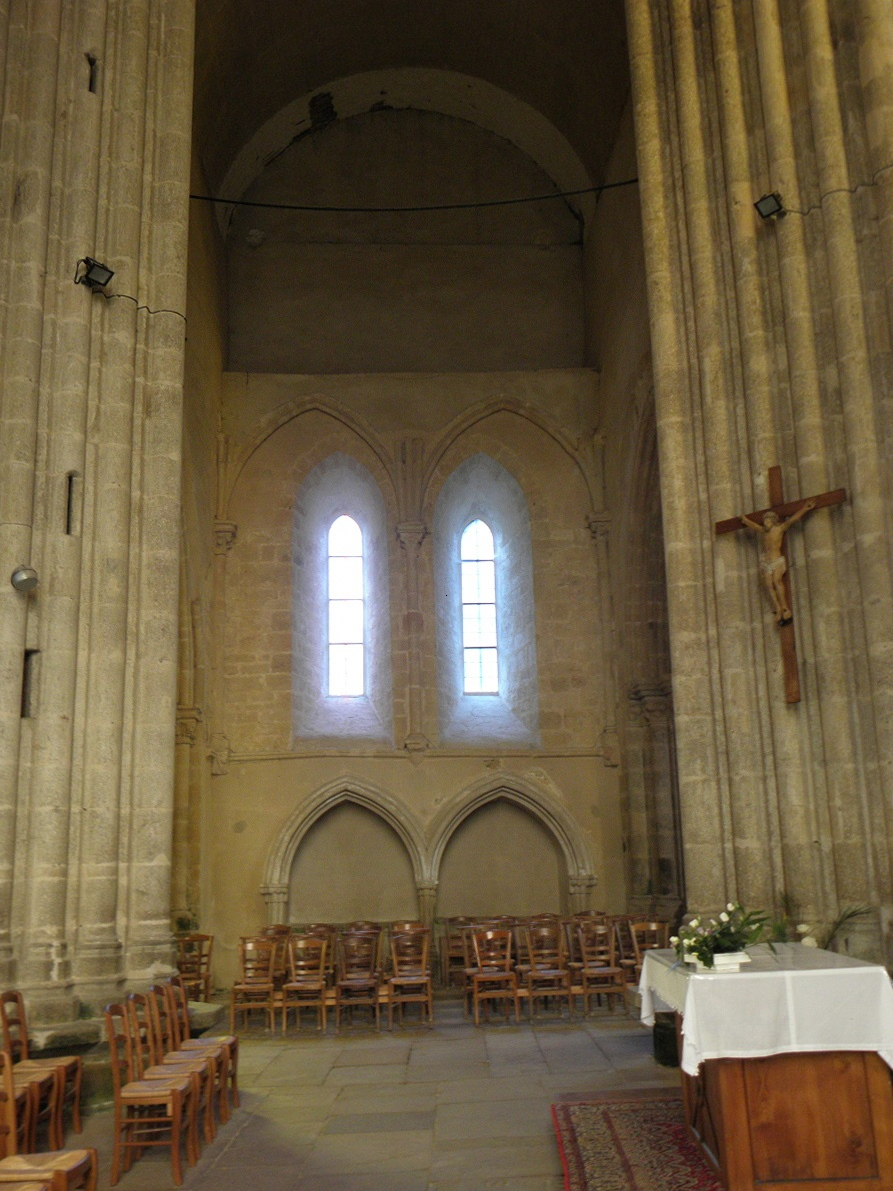
The choir of the Collegiate Church of Notre-Dame de Lamballe is said to have been built by Margot the fairy.

=== Abilities and lifestyle ===
Although they are relatively powerful fairies, known as the "high priestesses of the moors" by Jean-Claude Carlo, they are vulnerable to illness. Margot are reputed to be able to make themselves invisible when they wish. They often ask those who speak to them to look away, only to disappear as soon as the person turns their head. Like many other fairies, they are dancers: Pierre Dubois insists a lot on this aspect and on their dances in the moonlight, on Mount Croquelien, the Méné ridges and its moors. The fairies of Guenroc dance at night beside their rocks. They have all kinds of animals, except pigs and dogs. Most often, it is oxen and cows that they bring out of their underground dwelling in the morning and return in the evening.

A Lamballe legend describes them as builders, since they are said to have built the choir of the collegiate church of Notre-Dame de Lamballe and the underground passage on which it rests, which leads to the "Margot room", which contains the "Margot distaff" and its treasure, a heap of six-franc coins guarded by an evil creature. In the same way, the Margots are said to have brought the stones of Notre-Dame d'Espérance and the tower of Cesson to Saint-Brieuc in their apron in three round trips, which enabled them to build the church in two hours. The rocks brought with their fourth round trip would have been deposited at Trébry on the Mont Bel-air. The dolmen called "Margot the fairy's chest", still in Lamballe, would have been thrown by one of these fairies while she was carrying on her head stones intended to build a monument. Seeing a dead magpie and learning that everything dies, she abandoned her construction in progress.

In addition, some stories present Margot the fairy praying in their own church. The mention of a "superior" Margot in a fairy godmother tale shows a certain assimilation between Margot society and monastic life. It is possible that these additions to the stories were made deliberately to Christianise the fairies, and to bring them back to the status of former sinners who had returned to the right path of faith. It also removes the sexualised and pagan aspect of the fairies and makes them into virgin mothers and wives.

=== Interactions with humans ===
The Margot fairies show themselves to humans quite often and like to test them, a characteristic that is also very common among all fairies. They are rather kind, not hesitating to render small services in the household. They act as fairy godmothers, telling the children they have named what they will be. They generously offer enchanted food to people who ask for it, and they sometimes guard the herds of humans. They have a habit of displaying treasures under people's noses, and of depriving them of them if they are too greedy. They do not like indiscreet people and often make them repent of their curiosity, especially by bewitching those who pass too close to their home. The stories of the Margot fairies who are busy washing their clothes, and who break the arms of those who help them wring them, prove an assimilation between these characters and the night washers. They are known to come into houses, often down the chimney. Sometimes they do the work of the household without asking for wages. If, as a reward, they are offered a meal, they take a liking to it and come back every day to steal it if it is not offered to them. Often they are thieves and, hidden on the chimney, they spy on people's sleep to take what they like. The Margots are also child-stealers, kidnapping human babies (and sometimes even adults) to replace them with their own. When they can't replace them, they put them back on the steps of the cloth looms. Sometimes they need the help of humans to deliver their babies.

== Origins and analysis ==
The exact origin of the Margot is not precisely known. In terms of esotericism, it seems that, like the fairy Morgana of which she is an avatar, she may represent an aspect of the mother goddess and therefore of nature. Morgana and Margot share the sound "MRG", which refers to the grandmother in the language of birds, nature in its healing aspect. The relationship with Morgana is more obvious, as attested by the multiplicity of spellings in medieval manuscripts (Morgain, Morgues, Mourgues...), as well as many commonalities in their role and function as fairy godmother. They have also been linked to the goddesses and bird-fairies who heralded destiny (such as Morrigane), through "Margot the Magpie", although the possible origin of a panceltic bird-goddess is controversial.

== Tales and myths ==
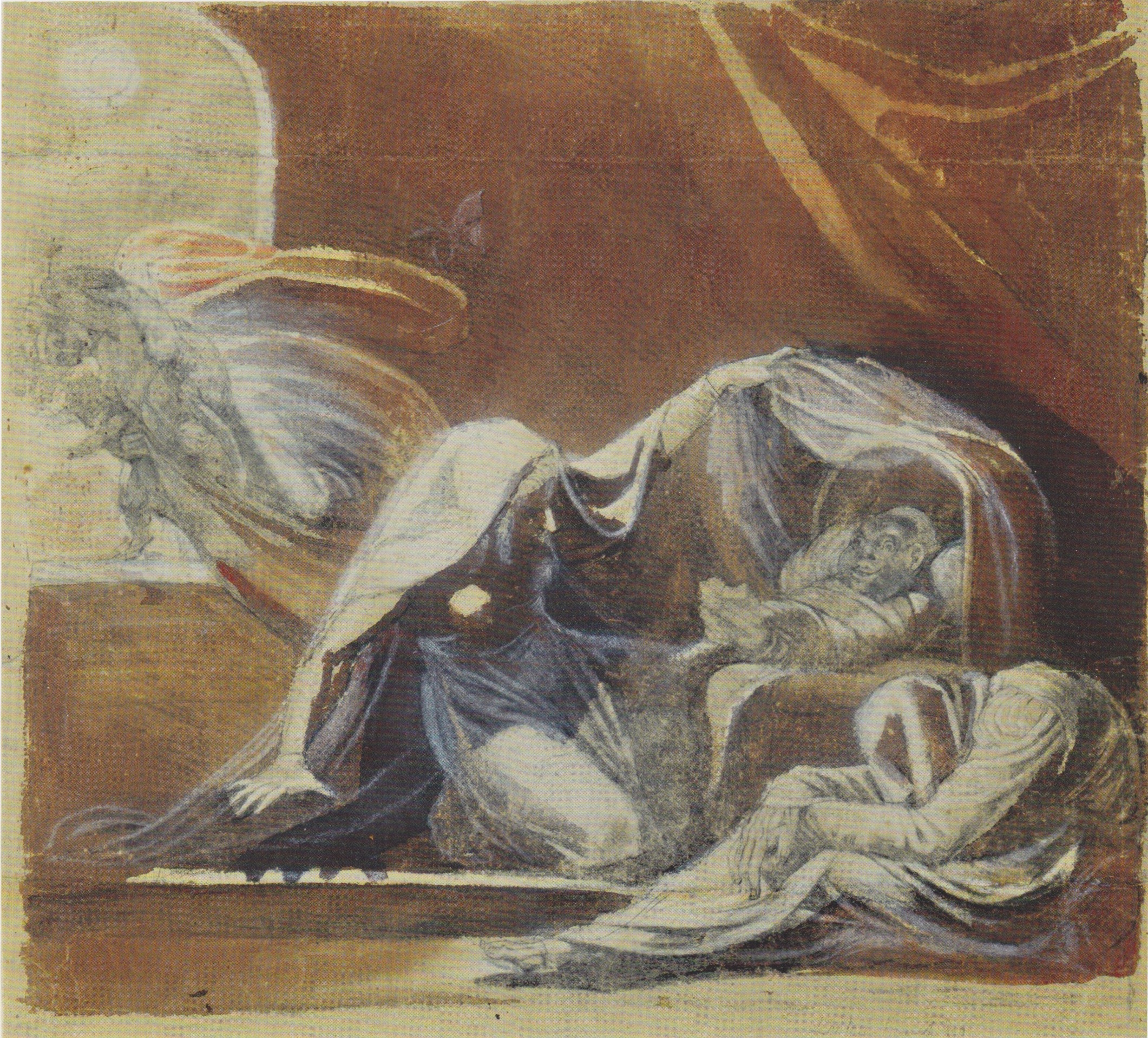
Johann Heinrich Füssli, The Changeling, 1780

Most of these stories come from the collections of Paul Sébillot. These stories put the Margot the fairies in the roles of godmothers, purveyors of gold and gifts, thieves or even child abductors, who leave a changeling in their place.

=== Role of godmother ===
Several tales and fragments of myths collected by Sébillot detail the role of the Margot fairy godmother. Around Collinée, a father of a large family is looking for a godfather or godmother for his youngest child, when he comes across a fairy Margot who offers to take on this role. She comes with "a friend" and all sorts of gifts and donations for the household, but, on seeing the child, vows that he will not change in size until he has made them laugh. Time passes and the child, who reaches the age of seven, remains as small as the day he was born. He catches a rat in his house and makes it his mount. Margot the Fairy and her friend see him being thrown off to lead the rat to the river to drink. They laugh so hard that the spell is lifted, and the child immediately grows to the size of all the other seven-year-olds.

The Margots show little regard for people who forget to invite them to name a child. A woman, mother of two daughters, forgets to invite the Margot's superior, the fairy, to name her child. In revenge, the fairy turns the child's face black as coal. The fairies take this girl into their service and order her to spin yarn as fine as her hair. One day, the Blessed Virgin comes to her rescue and spins in her place. The fairies order her to draw water from pierced pots, and the Virgin helps the girl again by plugging the holes in the pots so that she can accomplish her task. She asks her to clean her face with the water she has drawn. Immediately it becomes white again. The girl finally goes to a castle where there is a garden with a snake. It is a metamorphosed prince, whom she eventually marries.

=== Childbirth and child abduction ===
A tale collected by Sébillot in Le Gouray says that a midwife helped a Margot the fairy to give birth. She forgets to wash her hand and touches her eye. Since then, she recognizes the disguises of the fairies. One day, she sees the husband of the Margot stealing grain, and shouts at the thief. He asks her with which eye she sees it, and immediately tears it out. (Note: This tale is very common, it is found in the same form with a swell fairy, and its plot is known since the Middle Ages.) In another tale, a woman confides to her neighbour that she fears her child has been exchanged by the Margots, as he is very greedy and talks like a grown-up. She advises her to take some eggs, to break off the small end, and then to put small brachiaux of wood on them and light a good fire, near the child. When the little dummy sees the eggs boiling, he says: "I am almost a hundred years old, but I have never seen so many boiling jars in my life". The woman guesses that her child has been changed and cries out, "You wicked little wizard, I'll kill you! The fairy in the attic yells at her not to do anything about it, and promises to return the real child.

=== About donations and gold ===
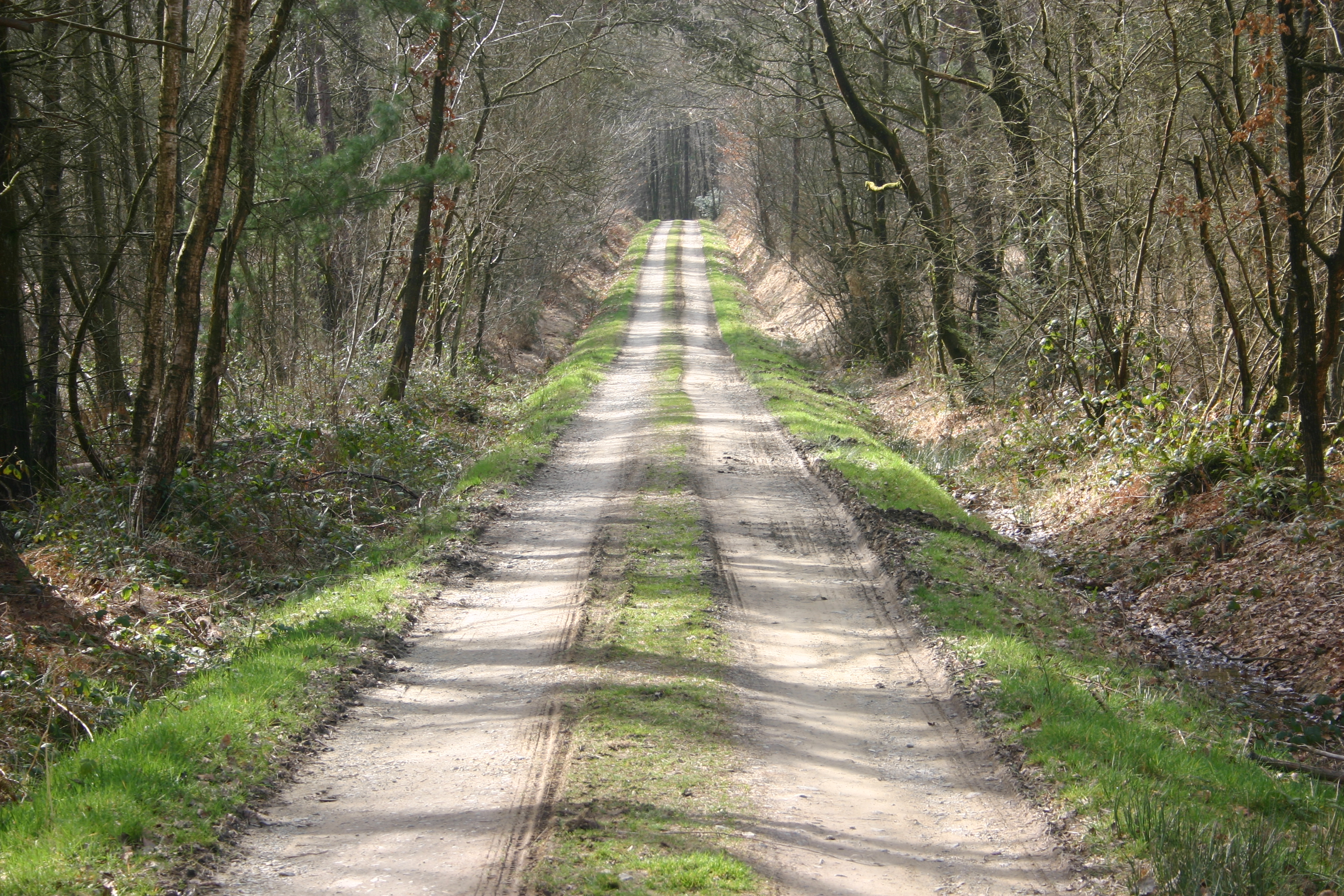
The forest of Loudéac, in which an encounter with a Margot the fairy is recounted.

A fragment of myth collected in Moncontour tells of a woman, at the Ash, who is sorry she has no bread to give to her children. She asks Margot the fairy for charity, and one of them gives her a gift of a song that never diminishes. But one day, the Ash's wife forgets that the Fairy Margot has forbidden her to share her bread; she gives some to a neighbouring gossip, and from that moment on the bread diminishes like ordinary bread. At the fountain in Plessis Wood, two women go to draw water and meet Margot the fairy who asks them for a drink. The first is very rude, the second gives the fairy a drink. When they both come back and empty their goblets, the one who spoke wrongly finds hers full of ugly animals. The other's is full of gold coins. The fairy of Margot Cave is said to have offered gold to those who give her a black chicken.

There are also several fragments of stories about the great wealth of these fairies, and how they punish men who are too greedy. A man named Jean Rénier went to look for wood in the forest of Loudéac. When he arrived at the Courtieux (courtils) Margot, deep hollows, he saw fairies spreading beautiful white shrouds filled with silver in the sun. Jean Renier approaches the Margots, who ask him if he wants money. He answers "yes", whereupon the fairies ask him to choose between having a full hat or a full bushel of silver (a bushel containing twenty-five to thirty kilograms). He chooses his bushel, but since he does not carry it with him, the fairies invite him to go and get it. When he returns with his bushel, the fairies and the shrouds full of money have disappeared. Another very similar story tells of a fairy washing her clothes with a shroud (bed sheet) covered in silver beside her. A man passes by and she asks him if he wants her load of money or the load of a horse. He replies that he prefers the load of a horse; but while he is looking for it, the fairy disappears.

=== Misdemeanours of margots ===
There is a woman near Le Gouray who every evening heated her supper in the fireplace; but while she was busy spinning, the fairies came down the chimney and ate her supper. She complains about this to her husband, who is a day labourer and only comes home to bed. He tells her to leave him home alone one evening. He dressed as a woman and took a distaff like a spinner; but he did not spin. When the fairies arrive, they stop in surprise and say that this is not the woman of other nights. The man said nothing; he took a stick and hit the fairies, who never returned.

One evening, a fairy Margot washes at the fairy house of Le Gouray. A woman offers to help her wring her clothes. The fairy accepts, but twists her arms so much that she almost dies. If the woman had not said anything to the fairy, the fairy would not have done anything to her.

=== Metamorphoses ===
Several tales mention the periodic metamorphosis of these fairies into snakes. A Margot fairy, whose daughter is on a certain day of the year metamorphosed into a snake, asks a peasant to go on the road and cover with a basin the snake that he finds in the designated place; he goes there and remains seated on the basin until the evening; then he raises it, and instead of a snake, he sees a beautiful young girl who rewards him magnificently. The storyteller Pierre Dubois evokes this tale by saying that the teenage Margot is forced to stay one day of the year in this form. According to Roger Sherman Loomis, this tale is the clearest evidence of a kinship between Morgana and the Margot the fairy, since an Italian song from the 14th century involves Gawain in a fight against a snake that transforms into a girl, and says she is the daughter of Fata Morgana. Another tale quoted by Pierre Dubois tells of two reapers having lunch, when a snake passes by. The first one says he will kill it if it passes near him, the second one would find it a pity to harm an innocent reptile. That evening, the second reaper meets a Margot fairy who gives him two belts, one for him and one for his companion, and warns him not to make any mistakes. He opens his belt and discovers that it is full of gold. Not finding the other reaper, he ties the belt intended for him to a tree, which immediately withers.

They also sometimes metamorphose those who disrespect them in order to punish them. In Le Gouray, a man went to the Margot "church" shortly before midnight to insult them, referring to them as women of ill repute. The fairy who was saying mass turned him into a pig.

=== Relationships with animals ===
Finally, there are tales that focus on the interactions between these fairies and animals, whether their own or those of humans. The fairies of Cas Margot, near Moncontour, guard their cows on the Chapelle moor with the pastures. They are not allowed to tell them anything. According to one tale, the Margot fairies have a pâtour to guard their own oxen. One day when they have "passed in damage", the master of the field wanted to hit them; but immediately his own cattle died. The fairies of the Courtieux Margot have oxen that cannot work before sunrise or after sunset. A man borrowed them to do his ploughing. He wanted to keep them working after sunset, but the oxen died.

In Saint-Aaron, north of Lamballe, a fairy cave is home to a Margot and her two children. She looks after the animals of a neighbouring farm, her children look after the cows and change their straw. One day, the farmer sees one of her pigs, very fat even though it is not eating, devouring a kettle. He takes refuge in the fairy cave when she tries to catch him. One night the farmer finds the fairy's children dressed in rags by the fire. She puts better clothes on a log for them the next day, but they disappear and never come back. (Note: There are many stories about leprechauns disappearing when they are given clothes.)

== Location, place names and beliefs ==
In Brittany, Margot the fairy is mainly present in the Côtes-d'Armor, through numerous tales and place names. Paul Sébillot has collected almost everything related to them in the communes of Le Gouray, Saint-Glen, and Penguily. There is a strong belief that certain megaliths, rocks and caves are the homes of the Margot fairies. In Pordic, a dolmen is called Table-Margot. There is also the Fuseau-de-Margot in Plédran, the Sabot-de-Margot in Ploufragan, the Chambre-de-la-Fée-Margot in Quessoy (a covered alley), the Roche Margot near Pontivy. The Roche-Margot in Plaintel, near the village of "Sur-le-Moulin", is an enormous block of granite. On the banks of the river Lié, three kilometres north-west of Plémet, a cluster of rocks is thought to be the home of the fairy Margot. One of them imitates the shape of a roughly carved armchair. This is the fairy's seat. A "Margot chair" is known on the Lande du Gras in Meslin: it is still visible today. At La Poterie, near Lamballe, the fear of the Margot fairy led people to avoid passing near their stones. A covered alley, now ruined, would have housed these fairies who came to display their gold coins in the sun. It is said that the stones of the Brousse, in Saint-Cast-le-Guildo, were the hostels (houses) of Margot the fairy. A stone carved like a cradle would have been used to cradle their children. In Moncontour, the swell known as "Cas Margot" located on the river bank is also inhabited by these fairies.

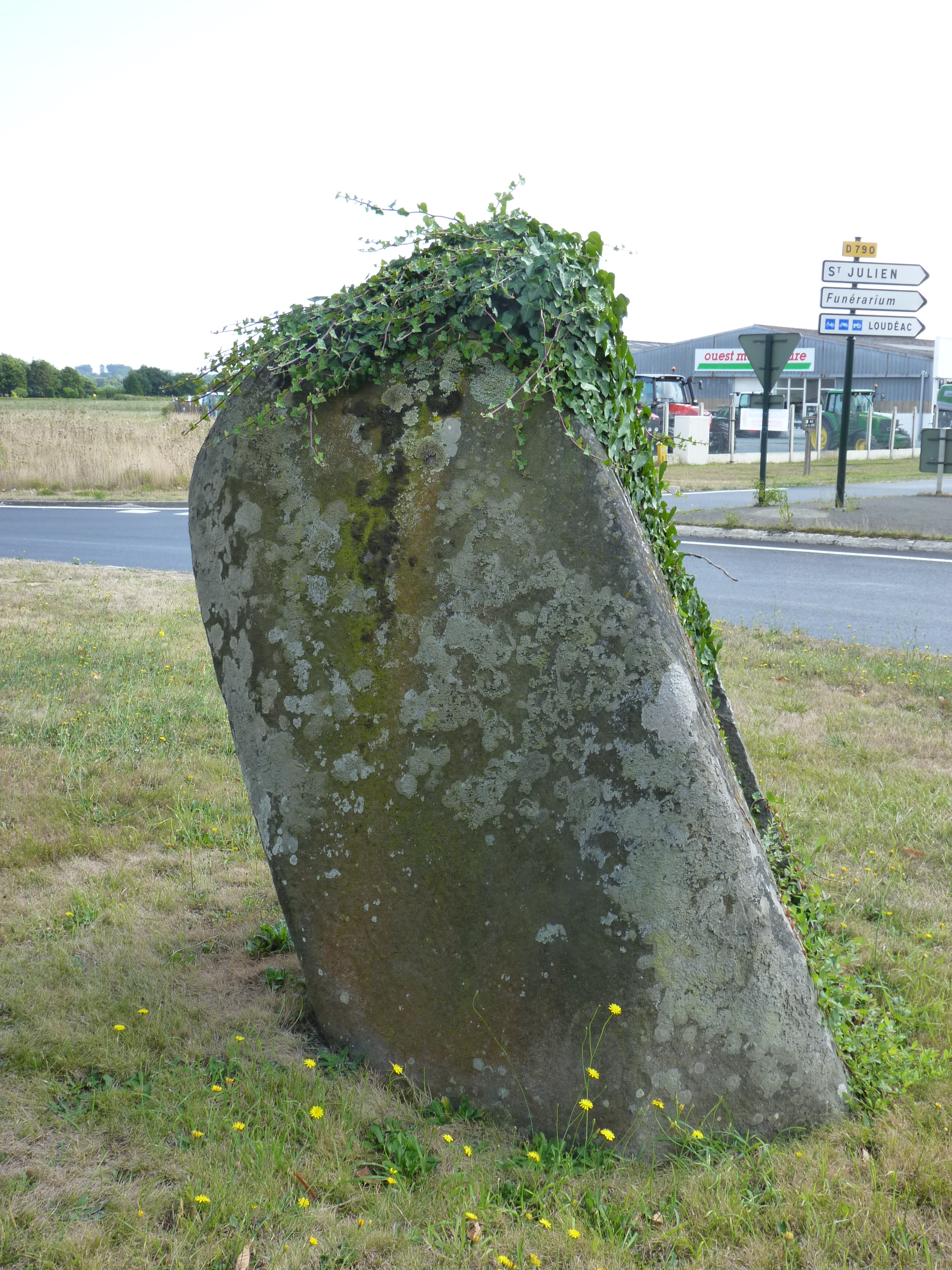
Le Sabot de Margot in Ploufragan

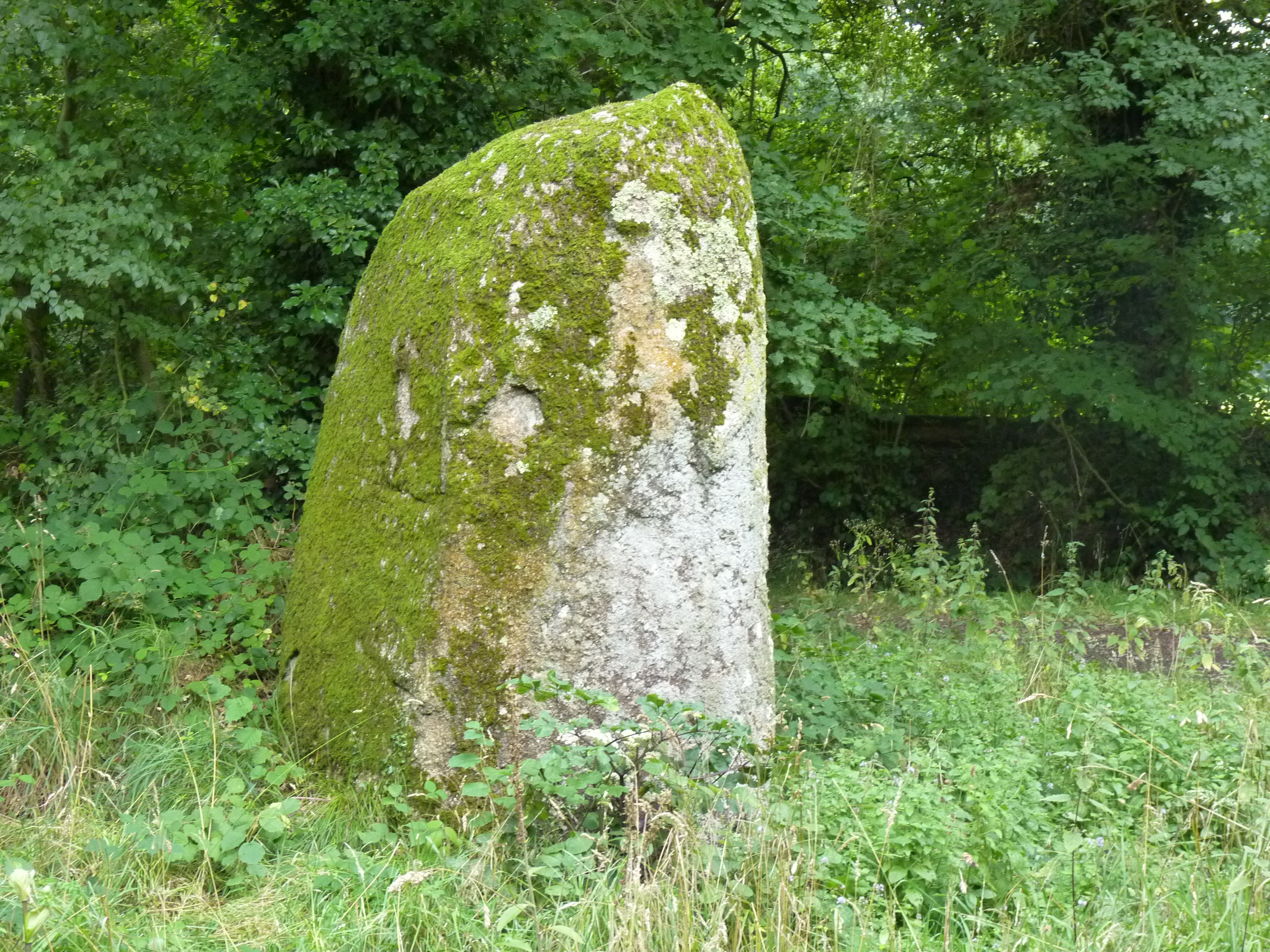
The Margot spindle in Plédran

Although the vast majority of these megaliths bearing the name Margot are located in the Côtes-d'Armor, there are some elsewhere. A 2.30 m high stone in the commune of Pisy (Yonne) is called Margot du bois or "the rock of the fairies". In Montrond in the Jura, the Margot cave is said to be inhabited by a witch. A place called Margot-la-fée exists in Avize in the Marne. On the other hand, the Roches Margot near the church in Senones (Vosges) are linked to a legend of a witch with this name.

=== Margot fairies at Le Gouray ===
The Mont Croquelien site, a wild and rocky moor in the commune of Le Gouray, is well known for hosting some of these fairies. There are boulders called "Rochers de Margot la fée", including a granite boulder on a high spot with a smaller boulder above it. A group of natural boulders in the small wood of Limbé has a cavity in the shape of an elongated cave. It is called by the old people "L'Hôté (the house) of Margot the fairy". These large rocks are 5 to 6 metres apart and about 1.5 metres high, forming a sort of house. Sébillot is told that the Margot fairies once lived there. The belief was still strong enough in the 1880s that the inhabitants refused to pass by after sunset. A 50 cm long footprint on the rock shows the feet of the Margots, the nails of their hooves and their her (cradle). There are two places where they would have made a fire, and large stones on which they would have sat to keep warm. Another rock is their bed; a smaller one their pillow. A little further on, separated from the wood by a stream, a flat stone is said to be the tomb of the queen of these fairies. There is also the umbrella and the ox trough of the Margots.

=== Margot Cave of Thorigné-en-Charnie ===
In Thorigné-en-Charnie, in the Mayenne region, a much-visited cave is known as the Margot cave. It is said to have housed a fairy sovereign. Its local myth was first mentioned in 1701, but it is certainly much older. The fairy or witch Margot, who lived in the cave, is said to have made a pact with the devil. He forbade her to enter his cave for a week, promising her a treasure on her return. Too greedy, the fairy returned to her home early and disappeared forever. A study links this legend from Mayenne with the Breton Margot. This fairy was worshipped throughout the local valley until the middle of the 19th century, through the sacrifice of black animals. In the 17th and 18th centuries, many people brought her offerings of black goats, sheep and chickens, while a diviner dispensed his oracles. This sacrifice is said to bring fortune, some sources attest that people have actually found money after an offering to the fairy Margot.

It seems that the cult of this fairy was closely related to that of the local saint Cénéré de Saulges, evangeliser of Maine who, according to a legend told by Albert Grosse Dupéron, would have in a way "improved" Margot, an ancient goddess, whose cult was later demonised and reduced to the rank of "superstition of the coarse and stupid people" by the Catholic priests and the educated upper class. Margot the fairy, the power of the Earth's interior, most likely represents a feminine aspect complementary to that of the phallic and solar Cénéré de Saulges. The proximity of the feasts of Saint Marguerite (20 July) and Saint Céneré (21 July) invites further investigation into their complementarity.

=== Treasures of the Margot ===
Tradition has it that the treasures of Margot the fairy are hidden under rocks, megaliths and religious buildings. In Pordic, three barrels of gold are said to be buried under the dolmen of the Table-Margot. In the 1840s, a chronicle tells that on the advice of a gypsy woman, the inhabitants try to lift the stone under which they imagine this hidden treasure. However, the Egyptian woman's instructions were not followed exactly, and the stone fell down each time, forcing them to give up. Similarly, three rocks on Mount Croquelien would protect the fairies' fortune, but any looter would be put to death. As for the treasure which is said to lie under the collegiate church of Notre-Dame de Lamballe, a procession is said to have tried to take it when a cloud of insects caused the candles to be extinguished and the monks to panic, who have since then condemned access to it. The Margot well at Saint-Cast-le-Guildo is covered with a slab that sounds hollow when knocked on, it is supposed to shelter a treasure.

== See also ==
- Morgan le Faye
- Tuatha de Danaan
- Tylwyth Teg

== Bibliography ==
=== Works cited ===
==== Sources of Paul Sébillot and Paul-Yves Sébillot ====
- Sébillot, Paul (1882). Les Littératures populaires de toutes les nations (in French). Vol. 9. Maisonneuve et Larose.
- Sébillot, Paul (1887). Légendes locales de la Haute-Bretagne : les Margot la Fée (in French). Maisonneuve & Ch. Leclerc. p. 25.
- Sébillot, Paul-Yves (1995). Mythologie et folklore de Bretagne (in French). Terre de brume. p. 233. ISBN 2-908021-43-9.

==== Other sources ====
- Doulet, Jean-Michel (2002). Quand les démons enlevaient les enfants : les changelins : étude d'une figure mythique (in French) (Presses Paris Sorbonne ed.). Paris: Terre de brume. p. 433. ISBN 2-84050-236-4.
- Dubois, Pierre (2008). "Les Margot la Fée". La Grande Encyclopédie des fées (in French). Roland Sabatier et Claudine Sabatier. Hoëbeke. ISBN 9782-84230-326-6.
- Guicheney, Pierre (2013). "Margot la fée dans la vallée de Saulges". Habiter la Terre en poète (in French). Roland Sabatier et Claudine Sabatier. éditions du Palais - Fête de la Terre.
- Ladurée, Jean-René; Pigeaud, Romain; Betton, Jean-Pierre (2013). "Du paléolithique au paléographique : Étude des graffitis modernes dans la grotte Margot (Thorigné-en-Charnie, Mayenne)". Bulletin de la Société préhistorique française (in French). 110 (4): 605–621. doi:10.3406/bspf.2013.14316.
- Le Stum, Philippe (2003). Fées, Korrigans & autres créatures fantastiques de Bretagne (in French). Rennes: Ouest-France. p. 121. ISBN 2-7373-2369-X.
- Leclerc, Y. (1982). "L'écrit de la Fée. Légende(s) de la Cave-à-Margot (Saulges, Mayenne)". Langue et littérature orales dans l'Ouest de la France (in French).
- Loomis, Roger Sherman (1949). "Le Folklore breton et les romans arthuriens". Annales de Bretagne (in French). 56 (2): 203–227. doi:10.3406/abpo.1949.1888.
- Mozzani, Éloïse (2015). Légendes et mystères des régions de France (in French). Robert Laffont. p. 1566. ISBN 978-2-221-15922-4.
