= Richard Ely =

Richard Ely may refer to:

- Richard T. Ely (1853–1943), American author and economist
- Richard Ely (writer) (born 1974), Belgian writer
- Richard Ely (1945–2019), American actor, singer and voice actor
