= Lower Brittany =

Western region of Brittany

Lower Brittany (Breton: Breizh-Izel; French: Basse-Bretagne) denotes the parts of Brittany west of Ploërmel, where the Breton language has been traditionally spoken, and where the culture associated with this language is most prolific. The name is in distinction to Upper Brittany, the eastern part of Brittany, which is of a predominantly Romance culture.

In colours, Lower Brittany, where the Breton language is spoken; in grey Upper Brittany, associated with the Gallo language.

== History ==
=== Naming ===
The words "upper" and "lower" in the names of Upper and Lower Brittany refer to the relative positions of the capital. In the case of Brittany, Nantes and Rennes have both been the capital of the ancient province called Brittany. Other French regions are also divided into Lower (Bas or Basse) and Upper (Haut or Haute) parts - for example Lower Normandy, Basse-Lorraine, and Bas-Poitou. However, the French word "bas" is often understood as carrying negative connotations, implying "inferior in status". The Breton name of Lower Brittany, "Breizh Izel", is used in many Breton songs sung in French of the 19th and 20th centuries, perhaps because the Breton word "Izel" has no such negative connotations.

=== Line between Upper and Lower Brittany ===
Having been based on linguistic areas, the dividing line corresponds very roughly to administrative borders. It had already been established by the 14th century and has changed only slightly since, hand in hand with the pushing back of the Breton language.

In 1588, the historian Bertrand d'Argentré defined the border as running from the outskirts of Binic southwards down to Guérande, leaving the communes of Loudéac, Josselin, and Malestroit in Upper Brittany. In 1886, Paul Sébillot moved the frontier deeper into what had been Breton speaking territory, the line then running from Plouha to Batz-sur-Mer. Maps in the 17th century favour the latter.

== See also ==
- Bro Gwened (Vennetais)
- Cornouaille
- Culture of France
- Enclos paroissial
- French architecture
- History of France
- Religion in France
