= Saint Enogat =

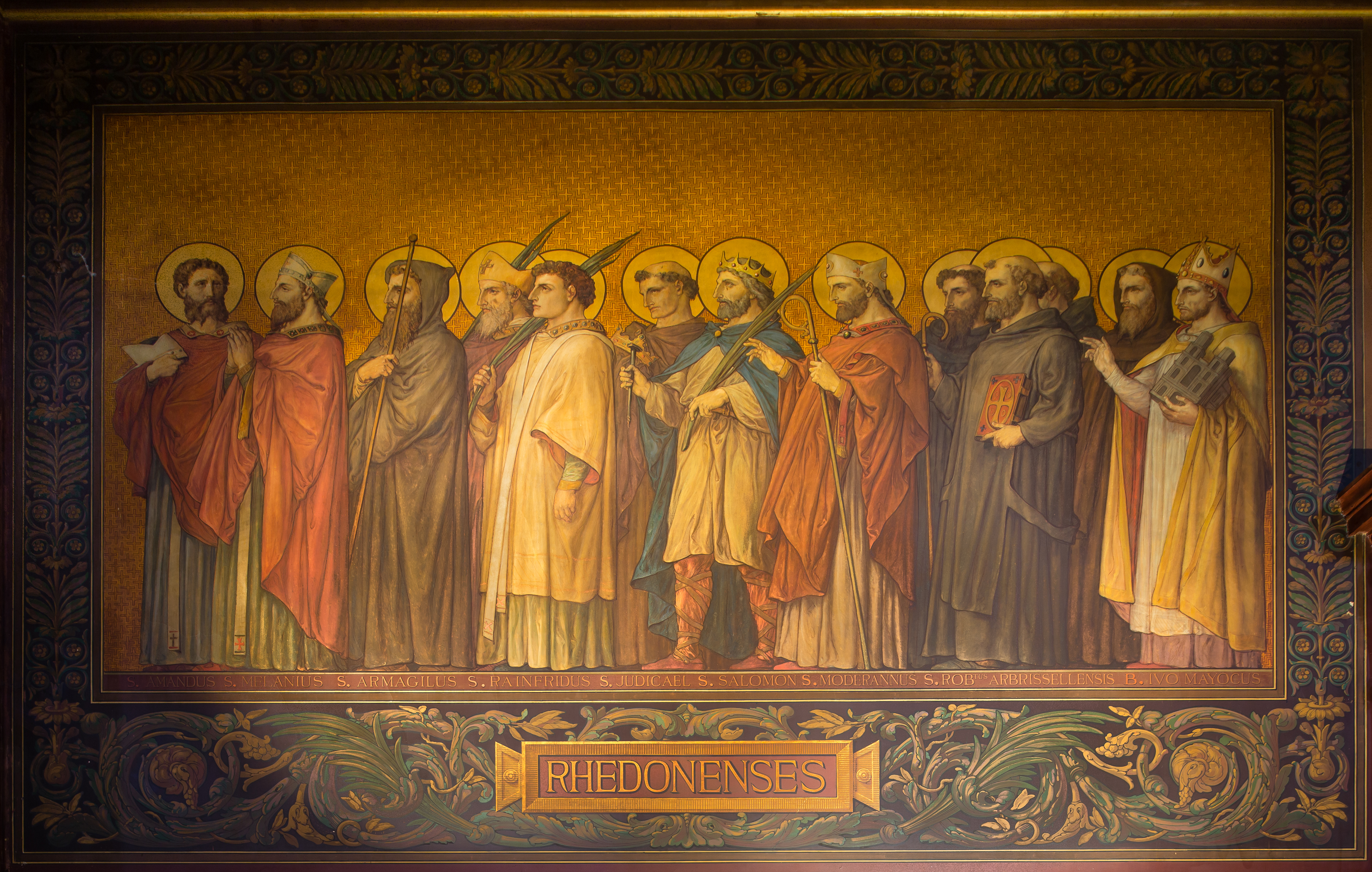
Procession of the Saints of Britain - Diocese of Rennes, Rennes Cathedral

Saint Enogat was a Breton saint and the fifth or sixth Bishop of Saint-Malo. His feast is 13 January.

Enogat was Abbot at Saint-Méen and Bishop of Aleth (now Saint-Malo). He restored the abbey of Saint-Méen and was noticed for his talents as administrator. He obtained for his abbey the possession of the abbey of Gaël. He collaborated with Conwoïon at the Abbey of Redon for the establishment of new monastic rules and was -- it is said -- at the origin of the election of the abbots by the members of the community.

== Bibliography ==
- Google Books - Page 52 Malo-Joseph de Garaby - Vie des bienheureux et des saints de Bretagne, pour tous les jours de l'année - 1839
