= Saint-Aubin-de-Scellon =

- Commune
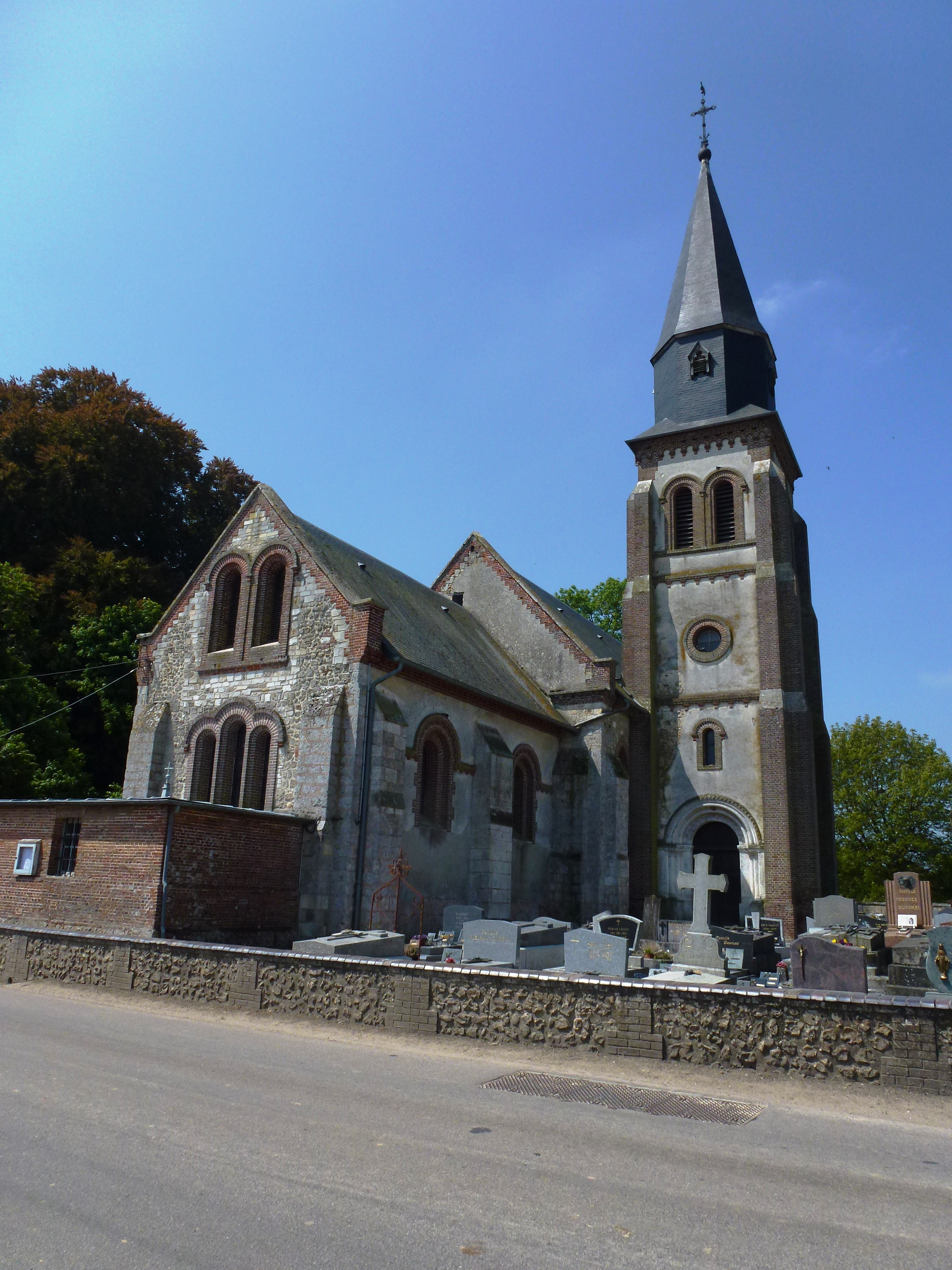
- The church in Saint-Aubin-de-Scellon
- Location of Saint-Aubin-de-Scellon
- Location within France Location within Normandy
- Coordinates: 49°10′23″N 0°28′33″E
- Country: France
- Region: Normandy
- Department: Eure
- Arrondissement: Bernay
- Canton: Beuzeville

Government
  - Mayor (2020–2026): François Chartier
- Area^{1}: 13.9 km^{2} (5.4 sq mi)
- Elevation: 172 m (564 ft)
- Highest elevation: 180 m (590 ft)
- Lowest elevation: 114 m (374 ft)
- Population (2023): 326
  - Density: 23.5/km^{2} (60.7/sq mi)
- Time zone: UTC+01:00 (CET)
  - Summer (DST): UTC+02:00 (CEST)
- INSEE/Postal code: 27512 /27230
- ^{1} French Land Register data, which excludes lakes, ponds, glaciers > 1 km^{2} (0.386 sq mi or 247 acres) and river estuaries.

Saint-Aubin-de-Scellon (French pronunciation: [sɛ̃.t‿obɛ̃ də selɔ̃]) is a commune in the Eure department in Normandy in northern France.

== Population ==
Historical population
Year	Pop.	±% p.a.
1968	347	—
1975	277	−3.17%
1982	299	+1.10%
1990	285	−0.60%
1999	314	+1.08%
2007	337	+0.89%
2012	355	+1.05%
2017	346	−0.51%
2023	326	−0.99%
Source: INSEE

== See also ==
- Communes of the Eure department
