= Françoise Morvan =

French writer (born 1958)

- Born: 1958; Rostrenen (France)
- Alma mater: Paris-Sorbonne University; Rennes 2 University; Faculté des lettres de Sorbonne Université
- Occupation: Scientific editor; children's writer; editor
- Works: Le Monde comme si
- Partner(s): André Markowicz
- Website: francoisemorvan.com

Françoise Morvan (born 1958 in Rostrenen, Côtes-d'Armor) is a French writer who specialises in Breton history and culture.

She studied literature in Colombes, then at the Sorbonne. Her doctoral thesis was in French literature, discussing the work of Armand Robin. She later wrote another thesis on the work on François-Marie Luzel.

Her subsequent works typically fall into five different areas of literature:

== Theatre ==
Her translation of Eugene O'Neill's Desire Under the Elms led her to translate other dramatic literature, such as John Millington Synge and parts Seán O'Casey. She has also created new translations of Chekhov and Shakespeare in collaboration with André Markowicz. She won the 2006 Molière prize for best theatrical adaptation with André Markowicz for her version of Chekhov's Platonov, directed by Alain Francon.

She also creates shows for Breton theatre troupes, notably Le Pain des âmes, D'un Buisson de ronces (Spiritual Bread: of a Thornbush). She also adapted the myth of Sainte Tryphine et le roi Arthur ("Saint Tryphine and King Arthur") from the writings of Luzel.

== Critical editions ==
She published editions of the works of Armand Robin, including his manuscripts, which she first published in their full original form, which had previously been truncated.

She has also published the prose works of François-Marie Luzel (eighteen volumes) by scrupulously adhering to Luzel's manuscripts, given in facsimile and always giving the original text where they exist in both the French and Breton languages (Tales of Brittany, Rennes University Press).

She has also published works by Danielle Collobert, and has contributed over a hundred prefaces, articles and essays to scholarly editions of poetry and literature.

She has also published translations of Marie de France and the poems of Sylvia Plath.

== Children's literature ==
La Gavotte du mille pattes (The thousand footed gavotte) was the first of her books of songs, followed by books of stories La Femme du loup gris (The Woman of the gray wolf), L'École des loisirs (School of recreation) and Lutins et lutines (Elves and goblins). She worked in collaboration with illustrators.

== Folklore ==
Editing Luzel led her to continue her research in the folklore of the fantastic and supernatural, especially fairies and elves, as in Vie et mœurs des lutins Bretons (Life and manners of Breton elves) and La douce vie des fées des eaux (The sweet life of water-fairies). She considered authentic folk traditions to be an increasingly frail barrier against the commercialization of folklore. She aspired to authenticity by basing her studies on journals giving precise references and citing them specifically in the texts, while including her own form of humour and poetry based on these sources.

She has expanded her work in folklore beyond Brittany to France as a whole and initiated the series "The Great Collections" published by Ouest-France: it has published the folk-story collections of Jean-François Blade (Gascony), of Amélie Bosquet (Normandy) and Henry Carnoy (Picardy).

== Breton regionalism ==
Françoise Morvan has published a provisional autobiographical memoir, which is subtitled "drifting identity and nationalism in Brittany". She has published on the same theme an article which was reproduced by the Breton Information Group (Groupe information Bretagne, or GRIB), which she helped to found. She defended linguist François Falc'hun from numerous "telephone harassment campaigns" by Breton nationalists.

Her memoir "Le Monde comme si" (The world as if) caused controversy in Brittany because of its attacks on the Breton regionalist movement (emsav). She discusses the arguments about the authenticity of Barzaz Breiz, the cultural and political movements in Brittany, their attitude during World War II, the creation of the unified Breton spelling, the Cultural Institute of Brittany, the subsidies given for the Breton language, the Flag of Brittany, among other things.

== Principal publications ==
- by Armand Robin:
  - La Fausse parole, reprint.
  - Armand Robin. n° spécial, revue Obsidiane, 1985
  - Écrits oubliés .1, essais critiques - Armand Robin. UBACS, 1986
  - Écrits oubliés .2, traductions - Armand Robin. UBACS, 1986
  - Poésie sans passeport, Ubacs, 1989
  - Fragments, Gallimard, 1992, ISBN 2-07-072245-7
  - Le Cycle du pays natal, La part commune, 2000.
- on Armand Robin :
  - Armand Robin : bilan d'une recherche, thèse d'État, Université de Lille III (Tomes 1–2–3), 2685 p, 1990
- by François-Marie Luzel, 18 volumes:
  - Contes Bretons
  - Contes populaires de Basse-Bretagne (3 vols)
  - Contes inédits (3 vols)
  - Contes du boulanger
  - Journal de route
  - Correspondence Luzel-Renan
  - Contes retrouvés (2 vols)
  - Veillées bretonnes
  - Nouvelles veillées bretonnes
- on François-Marie Luzel :
  - François Marie Luzel. Enquête sur une expérience de collectage folklorique en Bretagne Presses Universitaires de Rennes et Éditions Terre de Brume, 1994
- Publications on the great collections of French folk literature:
  - Jean-François Bladé, Contes populaires de Gascogne, Ouest-France, 2004, ISBN 2-7373-3446-2
  - Amélie Bosquet, Légendes de Normandie, Ouest-France, 2004, ISBN 2-7373-3442-X
  - Henry Carnoy, Contes de Picardie, Ouest-France, 2005, ISBN 2-7373-3496-9
  - Léon Pinault, Contes du Poitou, Ouest-France, 2005.
  - Félix Remize, Paul Sébillot, Henri Pourrat, Contes d'Auvergne, Ouest-France, 2006.
  - François-Marie Luzel, Fantômes et dames blanches, Ouest-France, 2007.
  - François-Marie Luzel, Contes de basse Bretagne, Ouest-France, 2007.
  - Paul Sébillot, Contes de haute Bretagne, Ouest-France, 2007.
- Translations:
  - Les Trois sœurs. Anton Chekhov; translated from Russian by André Markowicz and Françoise Morvan. Actes Sud, Collection Babel, 1992.
  - La Cerisaie. Anton Chekhov; translated from Russian by André Markowicz and Françoise Morvan. Actes Sud, Collection Babel, 1993.
  - L'Homme des bois. Anton Chekhov; translated from Russian by André Markowicz and Françoise Morvan. Actes Sud, Collection Babel, 1993.
  - La Mouette. Anton Chekhov; translated from Russian by André Markowicz and Françoise Morvan. Actes Sud, Collection Babel, 1993.
  - Oncle Vania. Anton Chekhov; translated from Russian by André Markowicz and Françoise Morvan. Actes Sud, Collection Babel, 1993.
  - Ivanov I et II. Anton Chekhov; translated from Russian by André Markowicz and Françoise Morvan. Actes Sud, Collection Babel, 1995.
  - Platovov. Anton Chekhov; translated from Russian by André Markowicz and Françoise Morvan. Les Solitaires intempestifs, 2004
  - Désir sous les ormes, Eugène O'Neill, translated from English by Françoise Morvan (mise en scène by Mathias Langhoff)
  - Long voyage du jour à la nuit, Eugène O'Neill, translated from English by Françoise Morvan, preface and notes by Françoise Morvan, ed. de l'Arche.
  - Nanny sort ce soir, Seán O'Casey, translated from English by Françoise Morvan, preface and notes de Françoise Morvan, TNS, 2002.
  - Théâtre complet. J.M. Synge; translated from English by Françoise Morvan. Actes Sud, collection Babel, 1996, Les solitaires intempestifs, 2005.
  - Le Songe d'une nuit d'été; translated from English by André Markowicz and Françoise Morvan, presentation and notes de Françoise Morvan, éditions Les Solitaires intempestifs, 2004. ISBN 978-2-84681-084-5
  - Arbres d'hiver, Syvia Plath, translation and notes by Françoise Morvan, Poésie/Gallimard.
  - Quand la poésie jonglait avec l'image, quatre livres pour enfants de Samuel Marchak translations by Françoise Morvan, édition MeMo, Nantes, 2005.
  - "P'tigars-P'tidoigt", conté par Alexandre Afanassiev, illustré par Étienne Beck, et traduit par Françoise Morvan et André Markowicz, éditions Memo, Nantes, 2007.
- Vie et mœurs des lutins Bretons, Actes Sud, collection Babel, 1998, ISBN 2-7427-1783-8
- La douce vie des fées des eaux, Actes Sud, collection Babel, 1999, ISBN 2-7427-2406-0
- La Gavotte du mille-pattes, Actes-Sud, 1996
- Lutins et lutines, librio, 2001, ISBN 2-290-31863-9
- Les Lais de Marie de France, Librio, 2002.
- Essays:
  - Le Monde comme si - Nationalisme et dérive identitaire en Bretagne, Actes Sud, 2002, réédition Babel, 2005. ISBN 2-7427-5552-7
- Henri Fréville, Archives secrètes de Bretagne, 1940-1944, Ouest-France, Rennes, 1985 (réédité en 2004 et 2008, édition revue et corrigée par Françoise Morvan), ISBN 978-2-7373-4453-4.
