= Upper Brittany =

Eastern portion of Brittany

In grey, Upper Brittany; in colours, Lower Brittany.

Upper Brittany (French: Haute-Bretagne; Breton: Breizh-Uhel; Gallo: Haùtt-Bertaèyn) is the eastern part of Brittany, France, which is historically associated with the langues d'oïl (French, Gallo and Poitevin). The name is in contrast to Lower Brittany, the western part of the ancient province and present-day region, where the Breton language has traditionally been spoken. However, there is no certainty as to exactly where the line between 'Upper' and 'Lower' Brittany falls.

In many regards, Upper Brittany is dominated by the industrial and cathedral city of Rennes, seat of the University of Rennes 1 and the University of Rennes 2.

== Distinctions ==
The principal distinction between the two parts of Brittany is that Lower Brittany is the historic realm of the Breton language, while Upper Brittany is that of Gallo and Poitevin, both oil dialects closely related to French. The isolation of Brittany from the mainstream of French society was always less acute in Upper than in Lower Brittany, largely thanks to the languages they spoke.

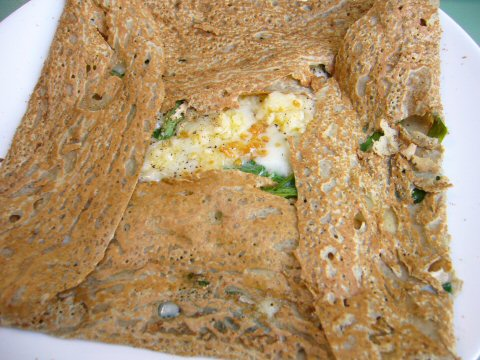
A galette

Together with other factors, this has led to other differences throughout history. The Revolt of the Papier Timbré of 1675 was more ferocious in Lower Brittany than in Upper, but the Chouannerie, a royalist uprising in the west of France against the French Revolution, the Republic, and the First Empire, enjoyed more support in Upper Brittany than in Lower. Upper Brittany accounted for some sixty per cent of the province's emigrants to French Canada, with especially high rates of emigration from Nantes and Ille-et-Vilaine, despite having a smaller population than Lower Brittany until the middle of the 20th century.

In the realm of cuisine, the pancakes known as galettes, made with buckwheat, originated in Upper Brittany, crêpes, made with wheatflour, in Lower Brittany.

In the 20th and 21st centuries, the growth of urbanization and industry has been more pronounced in Upper Brittany than in Lower Brittany, the character of which has remained more rural.

== Languages ==
In much of Upper Brittany, Breton has been little spoken, and indeed in some parts it may never have been the principal means of communication. Instead, the population historically spoke Gallo and Poitevin, and later a mixture with French. However, in both ancient and modern times the larger towns of Upper Brittany have drawn in large numbers of Breton speakers from Lower Brittany, and most of them have at some time contained various institutions supporting that language and its culture. At the beginning of the 21st century, it was estimated that about one-tenth of Breton speakers lived in Upper Brittany.

Gallo and Poitevin, like the Breton language, were until recently highly stigmatized, and their use declined steeply during the 20th century. Attempts are now made to revitalize them, with schools playing a role in this, but they are largely viewed as rural languages of older people.

== The boundary between Upper and Lower Brittany ==
Place-names are one form of evidence for the linguistic boundary during the Early Middle Ages, suggesting that it was much farther to the east than it is now, near Nantes and Rennes. For example, Pleugueneuc, in Ille-et-Vilaine, combines the Breton element plou (parish) with the name 'Guehenoc'.

The distinction of two Brittanys was made at least as early as the 15th century, when the names used were Britannia gallicana (Upper Brittany) and Britannia britonizans (Lower Brittany). At that time, it appears that Lower Brittany had a separate fiscal status. Since then, the boundary between them has changed slowly as a result of the long retreat of the Breton language.

Under the ancien régime, the boundary between the two was generally in line with the province's division into nine bishoprics, with those of Rennes, Dol, Nantes, St Malo and St Brieuc considered to form Upper Brittany, while Tréguier, Vannes, Quimper and Saint-Pol-de-Léon formed Lower Brittany.

In 1588, the historian Bertrand d'Argentré defined the boundary as running from the outskirts of Binic southwards to Guérande, leaving the towns of Loudéac, Josselin, and Malestroit in Upper Brittany. In 1886, Paul Sébillot noted that the boundary was deeper into what had been Breton territory, the line then running from Plouha on the north coast to Batz-sur-Mer in the south, on the Bay of Biscay.

The boundary between 'Upper' and 'Lower' Brittany is now a purely imaginary line and has no administrative or other status. However, having been based on linguistic areas, the boundary does correspond very roughly to administrative borders. The town of Ploërmel is one point where the two meet.

In area, Upper Brittany now takes in something over half of the 35,000 square kilometres of the whole of Brittany, but it has some 2.5 million people, compared with Lower Brittany's 1.6 million. In the early 20th century, about 60% of the population had lived in the Breton-speaking areas.
