= Richard Ely (writer) =

Belgian writer, journalist and ethnobotanist

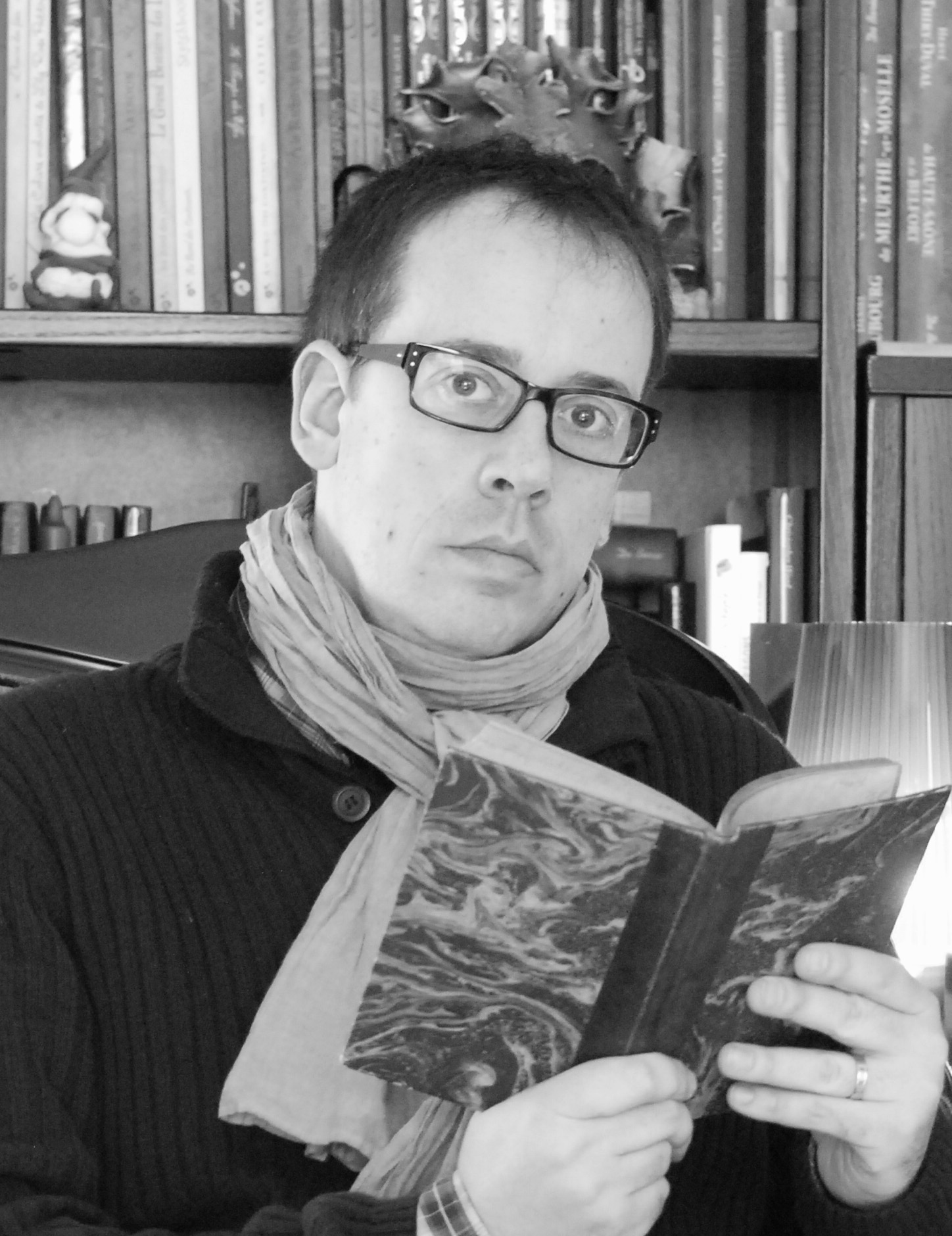
Richard Ely

Christophe Richard Ely Van De Ponseele (born March 20, 1974) - professionally known as Richard Ely - is a Belgian writer, journalist and ethnobotanist. Main instigator of the ‘Trolls & Legends” Festival in Mons (Belgium), he is also the former editor-in-chief of Khimaira magazine and the creator of the blog Peuple féerique to which he still contributes today. His books are mainly specialized in fairies and/or nature.

== Biography ==
Richard Ely was born on March 20, 1974, and raised in Ellezelles – a small village situated in the ‘Pays des collines’ in Belgium and renown for his witchcraft folklore. He studied humanities and social sciences in Louvain-La-Neuve University (UCL) until 2001 and developed a passion for folklore and fantasy. Here he met Pierre Dubois, famous “elficologist” (specialist in fairies and other similar beings)m French writer Claude Seignolle and Belgian writer Thomas Owen. Since 2011, he also holds a diploma in applied ethnobotanic from Lille II University where he dedicated his research to the use of herbal remedies growing in the Pays des Collines region.

In 2005, Richard created – together with the NPO he founded, Anthêsis ASBL - the ‘Trolls et Legends’ Festival. He later explained in an interview for Le Soir how he came up with the whole idea of such a festival. It started from the huge success of the first installment of the movies ‘The Lord of the Rings’. The ‘Trolls et Legends’ Festival was so popular it emulated many fairies and fantasy festivals across Belgium and France such as ‘Le Printemps des Légendes’ in Monthermé, ‘Cidre et Dragons’ in Normandy or the ‘Féeries du Bocage’ in Voulx.

From January 2005 to October 2010, Richard was the editor-in-chief of Khimaira magazine - a national publication distributed in bookshops across France and specialized in fantasy and science fiction. In late 2010, Khimaira magazine became a website.

In 2012, Richard launched the idea of the ‘Journées féeriques du 1er mai’ – a celebration of the fairies taking place at the same time in different locations. May 1 is a symbolic date in terms of fairies and many ancient festivals such as the Beltaine or the Floralia in honour of Flora are related to it. The first edition of the ‘Journées féeriques du 1er mai’ was followed by three new ‘1st of May’ festivals : the ‘Journées féeriques du 1er Mai’ in Avesnois (Prisches, France); Les rencontres Féeriques de Shawinigan in Quebec and Les Collines enchantées in Flobecq (Belgique).

Today, Richard allocates his time to his Fairies and Nature activities on his blog Peuple féerique, continues writing books, and carries on with his ethnobotanic research in the Pays des Collines - research aimed at understanding the relation between humans, plants and beliefs.

== Publications ==
- Richard Ely and elleN, Songes d'une nuit de fées, Spootnik Editions, coll. Estragon, décember 2007
- Richard Ely and Joachim Delbart, L'hôpital des fées, Spootnik Editions, Picksel, coll. Estragon, September 2008
- Richard Ely and Frédérique Devos, Le Grand Livre des Esprits de la nature, Véga, 2013
- Richard wrote an article in Forest Faeries from Séverine Stiévenart and wrote the introduction of Les Enfants de la Chimère, the Artbook from Khimaira magazine.

=== In Khimaira magazine ===
Mainly in Khimaira magazine.

- Comme le silence est doux pour ceux que le bruit achève..., 2001
- Iphrineos, 1999
- Avance Elohin, 1999
- Vésanie, 1999
- L'Zîl, 1999
- Délires vampiriques, 2000
- Au cœur des ombres, 2000
- Je me souviens..., 2000
- Frénésies..., 2001
- Lorsque l'esprit..., 2001
- Tristes cortèges, 2001
- Naissance de l'Incarnat, 2001
- Un doux parfum m'éveille, 2001
- Sur un chemin au fond des bois..., 2001
- Lycanthe, 2002
- Par trois fois, 2002
- L'Ombre du vampire, 2003 (with Christian Lesourd)

== Notes and references ==
=== Bibliography ===
- Jérôme Vincent, « Interview de Christophe Van De Ponseele », ActuSF, juillet 2008
