= Paul Sébillot =

French folklorist, painter, and writer

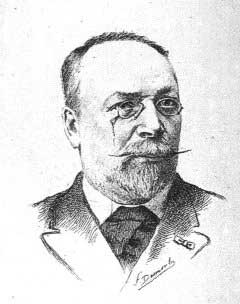
- Born: February 6, 1843; Matignon, Côtes-d'Armor, France
- Died: April 23, 1918 (aged 75); Paris, France
- Occupations: Folklorist, painter, and writer

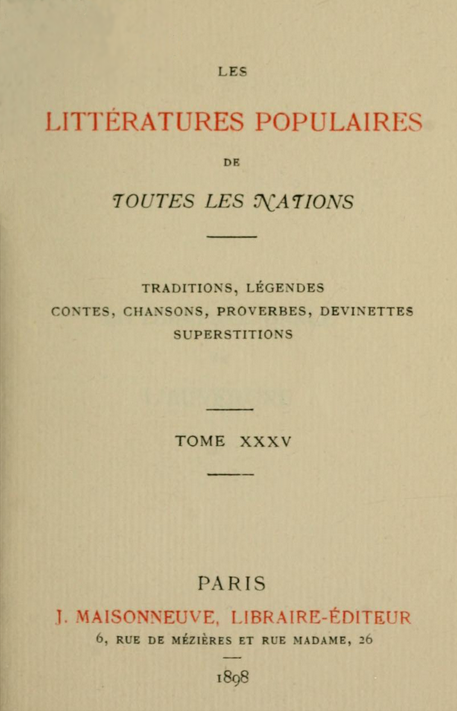
Les littératures populaires de toutes les nations (XXXV) 1898.

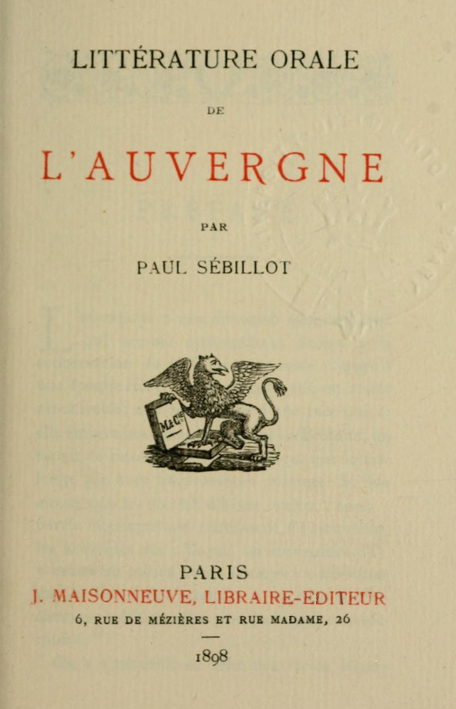
Littérature orale de L'Auvergne (1898).

Paul Sébillot (French: [pɔl sebijo]; 6 February 1843 in Matignon, Côtes-d'Armor, France – 23 April 1918 in Paris) was a French folklorist, painter, and writer. Many of his works are about his native province, Brittany.

== Early life and art ==
Sébillot came from an old Breton family and a line of doctors. His father Pierre Sébillot was cited for his devotion during the cholera epidemic of 1832 at Saint-Cast-le-Guildo, and became mayor of Matignon in 1848.

After studying at the communal college of Dinan, Sébillot moved to Rennes to study jurisprudence, which he completed in Paris in 1863. Very interested in painting, he also took courses with Augustin Feyen-Perrin and in 1870 he exhibited at the Salon a canvas entitled Rochers à Marée Basse (Rocks at Low Tide), which was also later shown at London in 1872. Sébillot continued his painting until 1883, during which time fourteen of his works were shown at the Paris Salon and two at the Vienna World Fair in 1873. His inspiration was largely taken from the Breton landscape. He also contributed to several journals as an art critic: Le Bien Public, La Réforme, L'Art français and L'Art libre.

== Writings ==
In parallel with his art work Sébillot began a literary career with the publication in 1875 of La République, c’est la tranquillité the success of which was such that it was republished twice in the same year. It was at that time that he met the folklorist François-Marie Luzel who translated the book into Breton.

After this he published new works regularly. In 1877, he created La Pomme, an association of Bretons and Normans, of which he became president the following year. In 1889, a monthly journal of the same name was created. In 1881 he initiated with Charles Leclerc the publication Collection des Littératures populaires de toutes les nations (Collection of the Popular Literatures of all Nations), to which he contributed La littérature orale de la Haute-Bretagne (Oral Literature of Upper Brittany). In 1882, came the creation of the Société des Traditions populaires, which organized the Dîners de ma Mère l'Oye, meetings of folklorists which gave rise to the journal of the same name. From 1886 he became the general secretary of the association and assumed the direction of the journal.

In 1889, he participated in the first Congress of Popular Traditions in Paris, and was named principal private secretary to the Ministry of Labour, when his brother-in-law, Yves Guyot was named Minister for Labour. He remained in this job until 1892, an ideal position from which to collect the information which would later be the subject of his book Les Travaux publics et les mines dans les traditions et superstitions de tous les pays (Public Works and the Mines in the Traditions and Superstitions of all Lands), in 1894. The following year, he collected the list of his publications (books and articles), under the title Autobibliographie.

In 1905, he was named President of the Société d'anthropologie.

== Selected works ==
- Contes populaires de la Bretagne (popular stories of Brittany)
- Le folklore de France (1906)
