= Morvarc'h =

Horse from Breton mythology

Morvarc'h (Breton for "sea horse", Breton pronunciation: [mo.va:rx], /moʊ.vɑːrx/) is the name of a fabulous horse of Breton legend found in two folktales reworked in the 19th and 20th centuries. Though its name appears in older sources, it was invented or reinterpreted by Charles Guyot, who named it Morvark in his version of the legend of the city of Ys in 1926. It belongs to the "Queen of the North" Malgven, who gives it to her husband King Gradlon. Endowed with the ability to gallop on the waves, Morvarc'h is described as having a black coat and as breathing flames through its nostrils. It also appears in a Breton folktale about King Marc'h of Cornouaille. In the course of a deer hunt it is killed by its own rider's arrow, which has been turned around by the spell of Dahud, the daughter of Malgven. She then puts the ears of the horse Morvarc'h on the head of King Marc'h, who seeks in vain to hide them.

The legend of Morvarc'h being from Cornouaille in Brittany, it is the subject of equestrian statues in the town of Argol and in Saint Corentin's Cathedral in Quimper. Folklore connects it with the village of Pouldreuzic. Linked to the water like many Celtic horses, Morvarc'h reappears in more recent works composed around the legend of the drowned city of Ys, among which are novels by Gordon Zola, André Le Ruyet and Suzanne Salmon, and a song by Dan Ar Braz.

== Etymology ==
The name Morvarc'h means "sea horse" or "marine horse" in Breton. It appears in Grégoire de Rostrenen's dictionary, published in 1732. This name causes confusion in the Breton language, because depending on the case, it can also mean "walrus" or "whale": Françoise Le Roux and Christian Guyonvarc'h translate the Morvarc'h of Charles Guyot as "morse" ("walrus"), a name they find "incongruous to designate a fiery stallion".

== In Breton legends ==
The horse Morvarc'h appears in two Breton legends reworked in the 19th and 20th centuries: that of the city of Ys with Malgven and Gradlon, and that of Marc'h, King of Cornouaille. This name is also mentioned in Barzaz Breiz, without any apparent link to the other two stories.

=== Barzaz Breiz ===
Théodore Hersart de la Villemarqué mentions a "sea horse" (morvarc'h) in the Barzaz Breiz (1840). This horse is a warrior symbol, as evidenced by the bard Gwenc'hlan in his prophecy likening it to the king:

Diougan Gwenc'hlan	The prophecy of Gwenc'hlan
Me wel ar morvarc'h enep tont, Ken a gren ann aot gand ar spont. Dalc'h mat 'ta, dalc'h mat 'ta, morvarc'h; Darc'h gand he benn, darc'h mat 'ta, darc'h!	I see the sea-horse coming to meet him, Making the shore tremble with terror. Stand firm! Stand firm, sea-horse; Strike his head, strike hard, strike!

=== The City of Ys ===
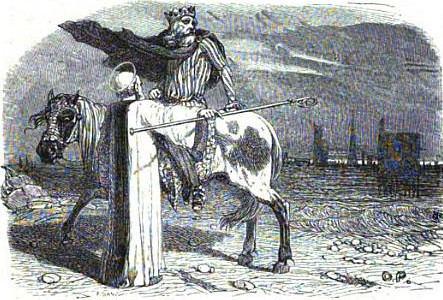
Gradlon on his horse, after an illustration of the story "Keris" by Émile Souvestre (1844).

Excerpt from The Legend of the City of Ys by Charles Guyot

"Morvark, this is the master I have chosen. Take us over the sea to his ships. You are more rapid than the wind, you laugh at the waves, you outstrip the storms, the sea-eagle wears out his tireless wings pursuing you.

Morvarc'h also figures in recent versions of the legend of the city of Ys, featuring King Gradlon, his wife Queen Malgven, their daughter Dahut and the evangelist Saint Guénolé, who is trying to persuade Gradlon to put an end to the pagan machinations of his daughter.

==== Lai wrongly attributed to Marie de France ====
There is a possible mention of Morvar'ch, not named, in a poem which Théodore Hersart de La Villemarqué presents as dating from the 13th century. Without having a specific name, the mount of King Grallon loses its master during an attempt to escape by swimming; the master drowns, and the horse runs wild:

His destrier, when he escaped him from the perilous river, grieved greatly for his master's loss. He sought again the mighty forest, yet never was at rest by night or day. No peace might he find but ever pawed he with his hoofs upon the ground, and neighed so loudly that the noise went through all the country round about.
The Lay of Graelent, translated by Eugene Mason

This poem, presented by La Villemarqué as a medieval lai by Marie de France, is better categorized as an Arthurian tale of courtly love.

==== Morvark in Charles Guyot's text ====
Contrary to popular belief, our detailed picture of Morvarc'h (here named "Morvark") comes mostly from a modern reworking of the legend, written by Charles Guyot in 1926, which is clearly influenced by the Romantics of 19th century. The legend is not fixed, and many hagiographized and folklorized versions circulate. According to the Celticists Françoise Le Roux and Christian-Joseph Guyonvarc'h this constitutes a "catastrophe for legend" and seriously complicates the search for elements deriving from Celtic sources. Indeed, according to Thierry Jigourel, this horse is an invention of Charles Guyot. (Note: Older versions of the Ys story often mention horses, but do not usually name them.)

In the version of Guyot's The Legend of the City of Ys published in 1926 by H. Piazza, this horse is "a supernatural mount worthy of a god, born of a siren and an undine, offered by the genii of the sea to King Harold, ageing husband of Malgven". However, only Queen Malgven can tame it. It is described as black, crosses the ramparts without reins or bridle "as easily as the hedge of an orchard", and "flies over the frothy sea". Malgven calls him the "horse of the night".

During a war expedition, King Gradlon of Cornouaille is abandoned by his army, while he besieges a fortress built by the side of a fjord. Left alone and pacing the foot of the ramparts to find a way to enter, one evening he meets a woman who seems to wait for him. This is Malgven, the queen of the "North", who tells him that she has observed him since the beginning of the siege and that she loves him. (Note: In Thierry Jigourel's account (Jigourel 2005), this statement comes after a day of single combat between the two future lovers.) She enables him to enter the citadel and leads him to the royal chamber where her husband sleeps. Gradlon kills him and seizes the treasure. To return to Cornouaille he mounts an enchanted horse, Morvark, who can run on the ocean, and rides him with Malgven. At the end of a day's ride, the lovers join the Breton fleet. A year elapses before they return to Brittany, then Malgven dies giving birth to a girl, Dahud. On the death of his mistress, Morvark emits a whinny "as mournful as a human sob" and begins to weep.

After Malgven's death it is King Gradlon who rides him, while his daughter Dahut has a "flame-coloured hackney". The horse reappears during the flooding of the city: "Morvark, the gallant steed, swam tirelessly shoreward; through flooded crossroads, through streets in torrents, he galloped, lighter than air ". Gradlon carries his daughter on Morvarc'h, but:

Barely does he stay on the horse, the latter bends as if three heavily armed men were riding it; then the ocean reaches it, embraces it, suddenly reaches as far as its hocks; and Gradlon feels his knees cold, his fingers grasping Morvark's mane. The noble animal strikes the sea with its powerful hooves; his chest boldly divides the swell, like the bow of a ship under the steady pull of the oars; it neighs with pride and rage, and raising its double burden, shakes its wet mane. Meanwhile the water licks its sweating flanks, penetrates into its smoking nostrils; it engulfs the riders to the waist.

When Morvark is about to sink into the waves, Guénolé touches Dahut's shoulder with the tip of his staff and drops it into the water, allowing Morvark to rise to the surface.

=== Marc'h de Cornouaille ===
In a tale collected in the valley of the Aulne by Yann ar Floc'h in 1905, Morvarc'h is also the name of the fabulous horse that belongs to another king, Marc'h de Poulmarc'h (or Portzmarc'h, Plomarc'h), near Douarnenez. Passionate about hunting, the king fails to catch a doe on his fabulous horse. Only on the edge of the cliff, near where Ys was sunk, is he facing her. He aims his bow and shoots an arrow that magically turns around and kills his horse. He rushes to the doe to finish it with his dagger, but she has disappeared and in her place is a beautiful girl. It is Dahud (Ahès), the daughter of Gradlon and Malgven. Before returning to the sea, she affixes horse's ears to Marc'h. He tries to hide this, and in the process he kills all the barbers of the kingdom who discover his secret until there remains only one, whom he tells to say nothing, under pain of death. The barber cannot hold his peace any longer, and divulges to a handful of reeds that "King Marc'h has the ears of the horse Morvarc'h". The reeds are harvested and bagpipes are made from them, but in a burst of music the bagpipes reveal the king's secret, making the whole kingdom of Brittany aware.

Yann Brékilien adds that this horse is "silver shoed", and runs so lightly "that his feet do not leave marks on the moor".

== Analysis ==
The horse Morvarc'h is an indispensable adjunct in the story of the legend of the city of Ys. Like many other horses of Breton legend, it is linked, etymologically and symbolically, to water and the sea. Stories of horses crossing the sea (often having some of the characteristics of psychopomps) exist in Celtic mythology, and there are many instances in popular Celtic traditions of maleficent horses who come from the water. The horse competes with the boat of Charon, the ferryman of the dead, in this role of psychopomp crossing the water. For the esoteric author Robert-Jacques Thibaud, who cites Morvarc'h as the first example, "the horse represents the primordial ocean".

The storyteller Yann Brekilien identifies the horse of Gradlon with that of King Marc'h, and describes it as having a black mane and as "galloping as well on water as on land". For Gaël Milin, although the tale of King Marc'h is often close to that of King Midas with his donkey ears, (Note: King Midas also seeks to hide this feature, but a barber discovers it, digs a hole in the sand and says the secret out loud. The reed grows and is used to make a panpipe, so that the whole of Greece is soon aware that Midas has donkey's ears.) the analogy stops there since the equine ears of Marc'h are probably a mark of the legitimacy of his sovereignty. This trope of the horse ears appears from the 12th century in a work of Béroul, The Romance of Tristan.

Morvarc'h supposedly left a hoofprint in the municipality of Pouldreuzic, according to Pierre-Jakez Hélias; the horse would have stepped on shore coming out of the water with Gradlon on his back, after the drowning of the city of Ys.

== In the visual arts ==
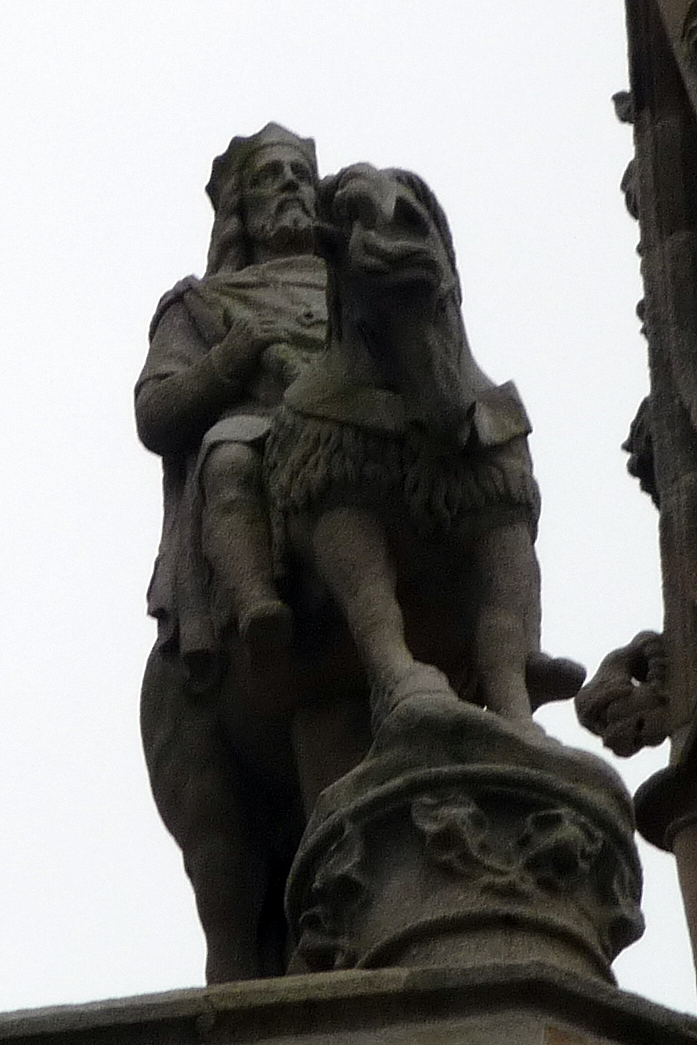
Equestrian statue of King Gradlon between the two spires of Quimper Cathedral

The first possible representations of Morvarc'h are ancient, there having been a lead statue from the 15th century of Gradlon on his horse between the two spires of Saint Corentin Cathedral in Quimper. (Note: However, though Gradlon is mounted, there is nothing to indicate that the horse's name is "Morvarc'h".) It was destroyed by the sans-culottes on 12 December 1793, during the French Revolution, with other art objects considered royalist. A new statue, this time in granite, designed by the architect Joseph Bigot, was based on a fragment of the old one. It was created by the sculptors Amédée Ménard and Le Brun, and was placed in the same spot as the old one in 1858.

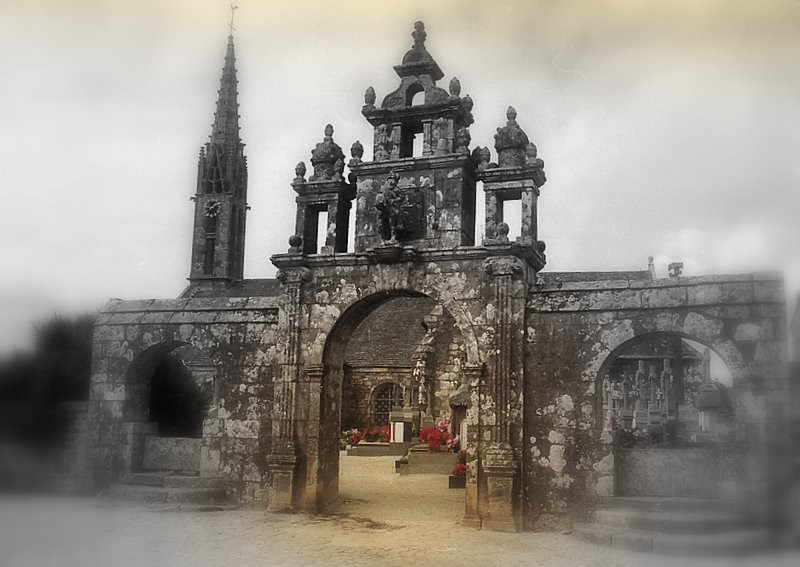
Triumphal arch at the entrance to the Church of St. Peter and St. Paul, Argol, featuring an equestrian statue of King Gradlon on the pediment

Morvarc'h also appears on a painting by Évariste-Vital Luminais, The Flight of King Gradlon, painted around 1884 and kept at the Musée des Beaux-Arts de Quimper. This painting itself inspired another equestrian sculpture in granite, made by Patrig Ar Goarnig, in the municipality of Argol. It represents the horse Morvarc'h ridden by Gradlon. On each side of the statue is a version of the legend of the city of Ys, a pagan and a Christian. The Christian version is the one that is most commonly told, the pagan version has Dahut managing to flee with her son on the back of Morvarc'h, while Gradlon is in the water and shouts to his daughter to stay with him. Another equestrian statue stands on the pediment of the triumphal arch of the Church of St. Peter and St. Paul in Argol. The poet Arthur Rimbaud parodied the legend in one of his letters, with a drawing titled "The Sledge", in which Malgven is riding a sledge pulled by a schoolboy who fears he might see it overturn.

== In literature and music ==
The horse Morvarc'h has made appearances in various novels, and also in music. Dan Ar Braz gave the title Morvac'h (cheval de la mer) to the sixth track of his 1977 album Douar Nevez. Novels which include the legend of the city of Ys are mostly pseudo-historical tributes to the legends of Brittany. Morvarc'h gives its name to André Le Ruyet's book, Morvarc'h cheval de mer (1999, reissued 2011), which tells of the travels of Philippe, a Parisian who discovers the wonders of Celtic legend. It is mentioned in Gordon Zola's parody, La Dérive des incontinents: "Having no boat at their disposal, Grallon the Breton and Malgven stole and rode off on Morvarc'h, the magic horse of the queen – Morvarc'h, which is to the sea what the morbac'h is to fleece, means "sea horse" – It was a beautiful marine steed – as black as the bottom of a moonless night and endowed with nostrils that spit fire. It is found in Ce soir à Cornebise, a novel by Suzanne Salmon where six holidaymakers practise spiritualism and contact the spirit of Dahut, one of them being a reincarnation of King Gradlon.

== See also ==
- List of fictional horses
- March Malaen

== See also ==
- Breton mythology
- Ceffyl Dŵr
- Each-uisge
- Enbarr
- Glashtyn
- Kelpie
- Water horse
