= Malgven =

Mythological character

- First appearance: Édouard Schuré, Les Grandes légendes de France, 1892
- Based on: possibly Breton mythology
- Aliases: Malgwen, Malgwenn
- Species: Fairy or human
- Gender: Female
- Title: Queen of the North
- Occupation: Warrior, and sometimes sorceress
- Family: Gradlon, Dahut
- Spouse: Harold

Malgven, or Malgwen(n), is a character introduced into the legend of the city of Ys, a mythical city on the coast of Brittany, at the end of the 19th century by Édouard Schuré, and is possibly based on a local legend from the Cap Sizun. She was made known by Charles Guyot (Géo-Charles) at the beginning of the 20th century, in his literary adaptation of the legend of Ys. As a valkyrie and queen of the "North", Malgven reigns over the land with her ageing husband, King Harold. She meets King Gradlon while he is raiding and falls in love with him. She persuades him to kill her husband and to flee with her on her horse Morvarc'h, towards Gradlon's lands in Brittany. The journey lasts a year, during which time she gives birth to a daughter, Dahut. Malgven dies in childbirth.

Although she may not be an authentic part of the legend of the city of Ys, Malgven provides a magical origin story for her daughter Dahut and contributes to the dramatic and romantic aspect of the legend. New representations of this character have appeared in a number of more recent productions, notably novels, a play and a graphic novel.

== Etymology ==
"Malgven" may be the most common spelling, but some recent texts use "Malgwen" or "Malgwenn". Françoise Le Roux and Christian-J. Guyonvarc'h do not explain the etymology of this name, but state that they consider it to be "neither Breton, nor Scandinavian".

== Description ==
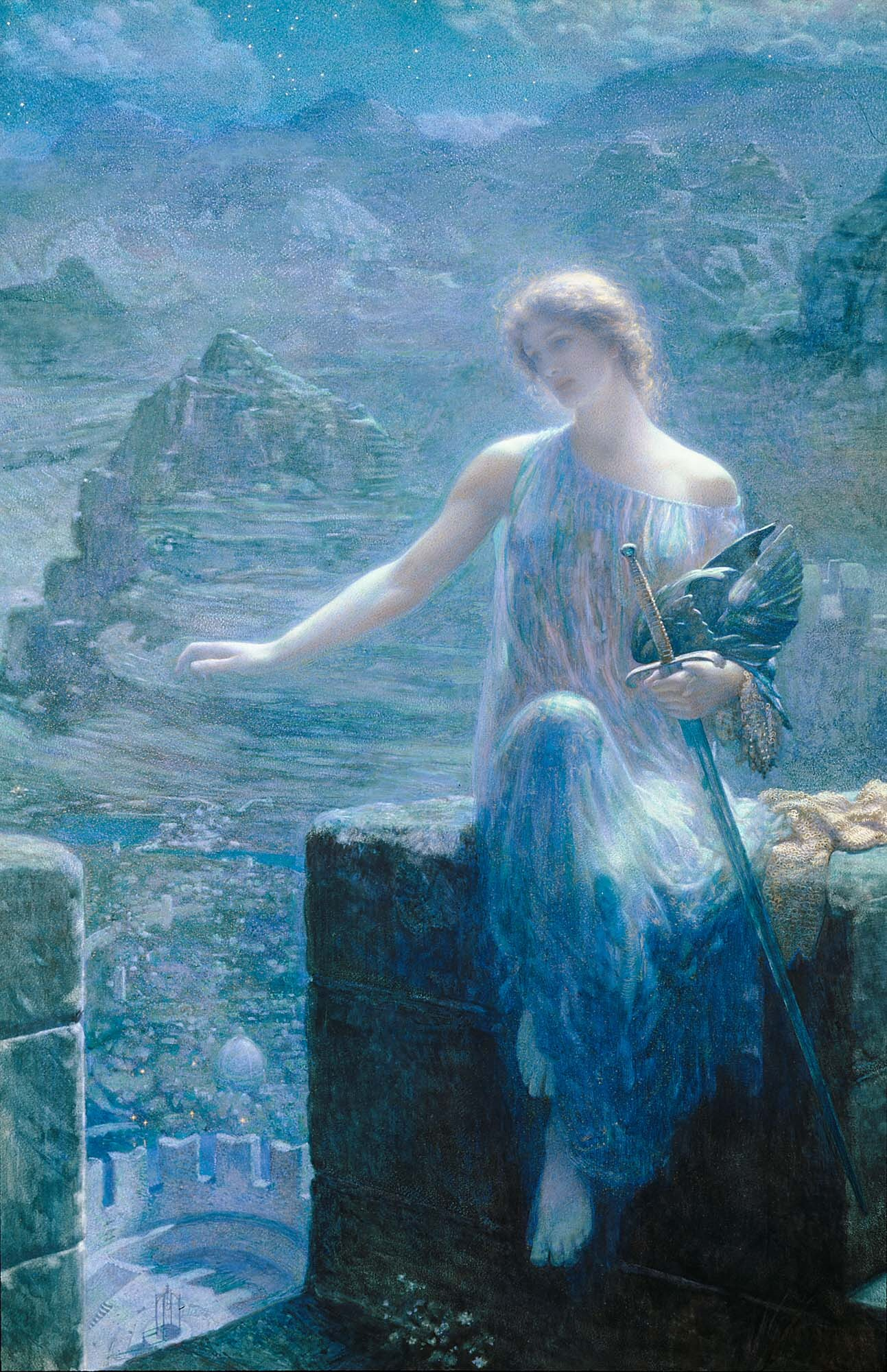
Pre-Raphaelite painting of a valkyrie, similar to descriptions of Malgven

Malgven is often cited as the wife of King Gradlon, and therefore the mother of the princess Dahut, in the legend of the city of Ys, after being popularised in this role by Charles Guyot at the beginning of the 20th century.

=== Origin ===
In the original legend of Dahut, there is no mention of her having a mother. No genealogy is given for her either. According to Le Roux and Guyonvarc'h, she represents a Celtic figure "with no age and no origin" and Malgven is therefore a later addition to the legend of the city of Ys.

Matthieu Boyd highlights the oldest known mention of Malgven in the essay Les Grandes légendes de France by Édouard Schuré, in 1892 (however, Schuré's text was pre-published in the academic journal Revue des deux Mondes the previous year). Schuré makes vague references to sources in oral tradition recorded near the Cap Sizun, according to which King Gradlon was looking for a princess of Hibernia (Ireland). This story is somewhat similar to the legend of Tristan and Iseult, and could give Malgven a more authentic origin, as Schuré engaged in extensive correspondence with his colleagues to collect legends. Malgven was then mentioned by name in a play in 1903, as the mother of Dahut. Her name also appeared in an English publication in 1906.

Boyd therefore disagrees with the conclusion that Malgven is purely a literary invention of Charles Guyot, although he remains cautious as to a possible origin in Breton mythology, as Schuré did not give precise sources. The lai of Graelent-Meur, recorded by La Villemarqué, mentions a relationship between King Gradlon (however, the identification of this character as the king from the legend of Ys remains controversial, as does the authenticity of this text) and a woman from the Otherworld. Based on this lai, Jean Markale — whose theories are strongly criticised by Le Roux et Guyonvarc'h — developed the hypothesis that after meeting the woman from the Otherworld, the "knight Gradlon" returned with Dahut, "a small girl with long hair". There are no sources confirming that this woman from the Otherworld is related to Dahut, or that she is Malgven, but in Celtic tradition, these women bring good fortune to their husbands and are capable of having children with them, which could provide clues as to her identity.

Françoise Le Roux et Christian-J. Guyonvarc'h (2000) consider Malgven and the horse Morvarc'h to be literary inventions by Charles Guyot, for his version of the legend of Ys. This version, which includes Malgven and Morvarc'h, is the one which has been recognised as the "canon version" of the town of Ys since the mid 20th century, notably by Jean Markale.

=== Physical appearance and kingdom ===
Malgven is often described as the "queen of the North". The country over which she reigns could be Ireland, Norway, or Denmark. Malgven is thus considered a "'dannite'," or Danish, in some texts from the late 19th century, but Charles Guyot portrays her as a Norwegian valkyrie. Édouard Schuré gives the following description of her (1908):

formidable and beautiful was the queen of the North, with her golden diadem, her corset of steel chainmail, from which arms as white as snow emerge, and the golden ringlets of her hair, which fall upon her deep blue armour, less blue and less shimmering than her eyes

She is described as a red haired woman in other versions, such as that of Florian Le Roy (1928):

In the moonlight, her chainmail and her armour flowing with brightness, was a woman with red hair spread out widely. She was as beautiful as a goddess of War. A water of enchantment shone in her eyes. It was Malgven, queen of the North

. Pascal Bancourt sees her as a "fairy of the North" with the appearance of a woman warrior, with curly hair. The most well-known version portrays her as the wife of the ageing Nordic king Harold. Malgven falls in love with King Gradlon, and persuades him to kill her husband.

== Literary evolution ==
The earliest known version, that of Édouard Schuré, depicts Malgven as a sorceress, "an Irish druid or a Scandinavian goddess who killed her first owner, to follow the Armorican leader" Gradlon. But no sooner does he become king of Cornouaille than she suddenly dies. Gradlon falls into despondency, wine and debauchery, unable to forget her. He feels he is able to see his wife again in his daughter Dahut as he watches her grow up.

=== Malgven in Charles Guyot's novel ===
At the beginning of the 20th century, Charles Guyot published La Légende de la ville d'Ys d'après les anciens textes with H. Piazza Editions, a work which saw remarkable success, with an eleventh edition appearing in 1926. It was regularly republished throughout the 20th century, notably in 1987, 1998 and 1999 (with Groupe Flammarion), and was also translated into English in 1979.

Malgven mainly appears in the first chapter, titled "Le deuil de Gradlon". Gradlon, king of Cornouaille, leaves to wage war on Norway at the head of a considerable fleet. After a long and exhausting voyage, he arrives at the border of the kingdom of the North. The Bretons engage him in battle for the first time, a massacre in which neither side prevails over the other. This is repeated the following day, with a similar battle and the same death toll, but this time Malgven participates in the fighting. The king of Cornouaille lays siege in vain to a fortress nestled deep in a fjord, but as winter approaches the army refuses to stay and departs for Armorica, leaving the king alone. Every night, he tries to find a way to penetrate the fortress. One evening, a woman is waiting for him at the foot of the ramparts. She tells him that it is impossible to capture the town and its treasure without her help. She offers to let him in, but he must kill the king, an old, avaricious and unfaithful man with a rusted sword. In the citadel, Gradlon kills the queen's husband who has fallen asleep in a drunken stupor. The couple flee with the treasure on Morvarc'h ("the sea horse"), an animal capable of running on water. The horse sets out across the sea and joins Gradlon's boat. The return journey lasts a year. Malgven and Gradlon's love results in a daughter, Dahut. The queen dies in childbirth. Gradlon is inconsolable after the death of his lover and shifts all his affection onto his daughter, who resembles Malgven and practices the Celtic religion.

Malgven's role contributes to the dramatic aspect of this novel, through the episode of her death in childbirth. Thierry Jigourel believes that, through the addition of Morvarc'h and Malgven, Guyot gives "an astonishing novelistic strength" to his text. Françoise Le Roux and Christian-J. Guyonvarc'h condemn the "unjustified notoriety of this book", which they describe as a "falsification of a Breton legend for commercial purposes".

=== Later developments ===
The various authors who speak about the city of Ys, often basing their works on Charles Guyot's text, introduce slight differences to his version. Georges-Gustave Toudouze quotes a summary of the legend in the journal L'Ouest-Éclair (which would later become Ouest-France) in 1933:

When Gradlon succeeded Conan Meriadoc, he departed across the sea, roaming with a fleet, of which he lost three-quarters. In the waters of the North, he met a queen, Malgven, who fell in love with him and who he married according to rituals of the Nordic country. She lived on, she voyaged with him across the sea

. In 1937, in an article in Paris-Soir, Malgven is depicted as Gradlon's wife, "who he brought back from the North". Dahut is not his daughter, she is "the daughter of Malgven and the devil — the child of a sinister and adulterous affair". In Thierry Jigourel's version of the legend, Gradlon learns of the existence of the kingdom of the North, of its treasures and of Malgven by overhearing a conversation between sailors in an inn in Quimper. Queen Malgven declares her love for him after a day of single combat between the two future lovers.

== Recent adaptations and new uses ==
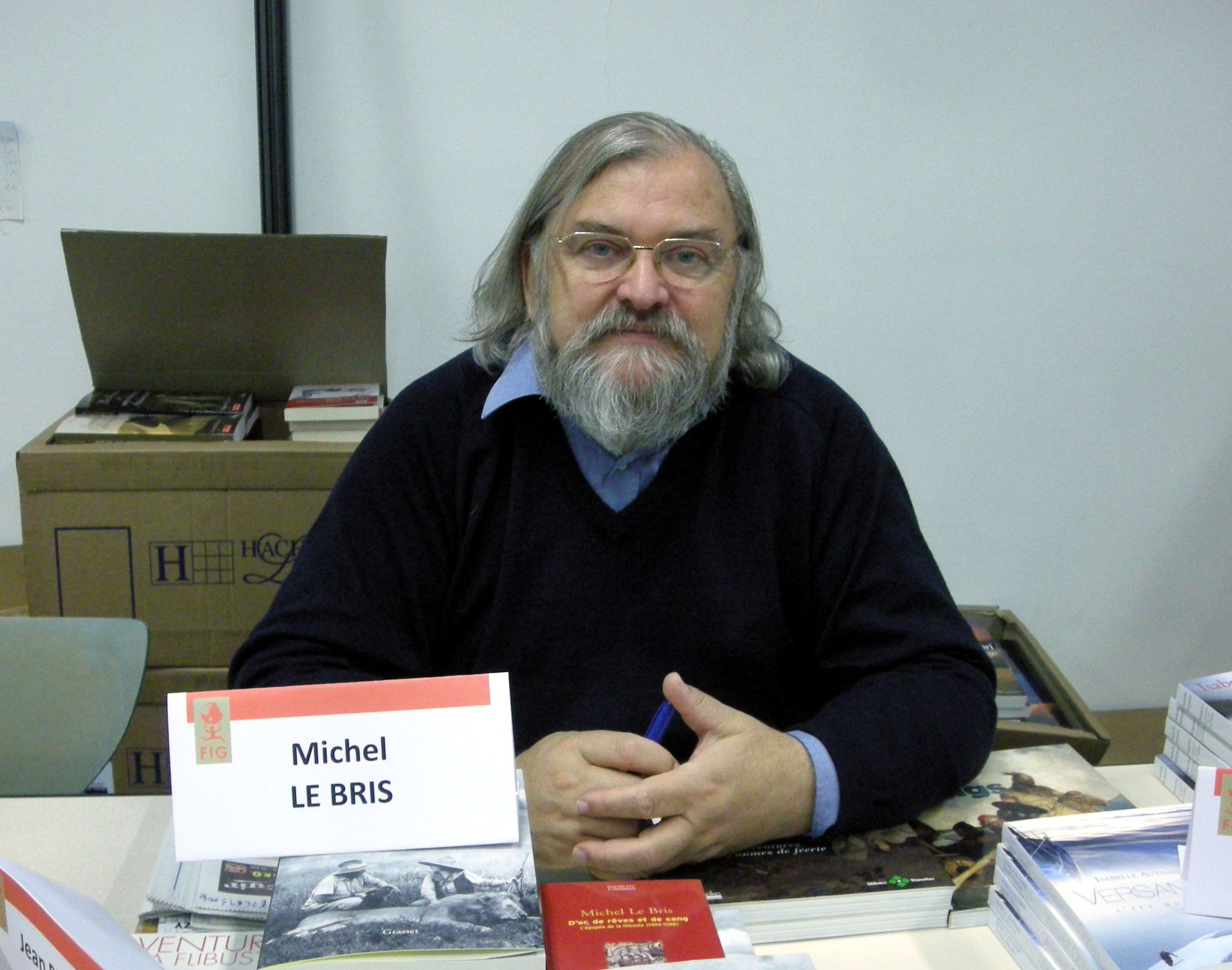
Michel Le Bris revives the character of Malgven in his play Ys, dans la rumeur des vagues (1985).

In the majority of recent literary adaptations of the legend of the city of Ys, the portrayal of Malgven resembles Charles Guyot's version. Notably, this is the case with Henri Iselin (Légendes des cités perdues, 1964), Jean Markale ("La ville engloutie ou le mythe celtique des origines" in Les Celtes, 1969), the storyteller Yann Brékilien who re-uses the "fairy Malgven, queen of the North" as the mother of Dahut (Contes et légendes du pays breton, 1973), Michel Le Bris (for his play Ys, dans la rumeur des vagues, 1985), Françoise Gange (La ville plus basse que la mer, 1988) and Christian Querré (La légende de la ville d'Ys, 1996).

Malgven is present in the humorous version of the legend of Ys in La Dérive des incontinents by Gordon Zola. In Édouard Brasey's novel La Sirène d'Ouessant (2014), Malgven is an old healer who follows pagan traditions. The graphic novel series Les Druides by Thierry Jigourel, Jean-Luc Istin and Jacques Lamontagne mentions Malgven in its second volume, "Is la blanche" (2006), when Gwench'lan must investigate a murder in the legendary city, against a background of tensions between Catholics and Pagans.

Arthur Rimbaud parodies the legend in one of his letters, with a sketch titled "The Sledge" - Malgven is riding a sledge pulled by a schoolboy who is scared to topple it over. Malgven is also the name of a strong red ale, produced in the artisanal brewery "La Korrigane" in Quebec.

== See also ==
- Ys
- Gradlon (husband)
- Morvarc'h (horse)
- Dahut (daughter)

== Bibliography ==
=== Primary sources ===
- Guyot, Charles (1926). La légende de la ville d'Ys. Épopée et Légendes. Edition d'art H. Piazza. p. 148.
  Réédité en 1998 chez Coop Breizh et en 1999 chez Gallimard.
- Jigourel, Thierry (2005). Merlin, Tristan, Is et autres contes brittoniques (in French). Paris: Jean Picollec éditeur. p. 270. ISBN 2-86477-213-2.
- Schuré, Édouard (1908). Les grandes légendes de France. Paris: Perrin.

=== Secondary sources ===
- [Amemiya 2006] Hiroko Amemiya, « La déesse bretonne de la mer », dans Littératures de Bretagne. Mélanges offerts à Yann-Ber Piriou, Rennes, Presses universitaires de Rennes, 2006 (ISBN 2753502099, 9782753502093), p. 253-266.
- Bancourt, Pascal (2003). Les mystères de la ville d'Is (in French). Monaco/Paris: éditions du Rocher. p. 261. ISBN 2-268-04508-0.
- Boyd, Matthieu (2006). "L'enfant d'Ahez ou le fabuleux parcours du comte Kristof, une légende de la ville d'Is". Littératures de Bretagne: mélanges offerts à Yann-Ber Piriou. Rennes: Presses Univ. de Rennes. ISBN 9782753502093.
- Boyd, Matthieu (November 2013). "What's New in Ker-Is: ATU 675 in Brittany". Fabula. 54 (3–4): 235–262. doi:10.1515/fabula-2013-0020. ISSN 1613-0464. S2CID 162221933.
- Le Roux, Françoise; Guyonvarc'h, Christian-J. (May 2000). La légende de la ville d'Is. De mémoire d'Homme (in French). éditions Ouest-France. p. 335. ISBN 978-2-7373-1413-1.
  Textes précédés par 130 pages d'analyses.
- Joël Hascoët (2012), " À la recherche de Ker-Is ", dans Guide de la France merveilleuse, Paris: Payot, p. 306
- Varin, Amy (1982). "Dahut and Gradlon". Proceedings of the Harvard Celtic Colloquium. Vol. 2. Department of Celtic Languages & Literatures, université d'Harvard. pp. 19–30.
