= Le Goarnig =

- Pronunciation: pronounced [ɡwaˈrnik]

Origin
- Origin: Breton
- Meaning: little housekeeper, little governess.
- Region of origin: Brittany

Other names
- Variant forms: Gouarnic, Goarnigou, Le Guernic, Le Guernigou

Le Goarnig is a surname, and may refer to:

Goarnig derives from gouarn which means govern in Breton and the suffix -ig is very frequently used as a diminutive of common and proper nouns.

- Jean-Jacques Manrot-Le Goarnig and Mireille Manrot-Le Goarnig (née Lier), Breton activists who legally thought against the French state, especially Article 1 of the 11 germinal an XI (2 April 1803) law, for French parents’ right to give their son or daughter a Breton or another regional language first name (i.e. Garlonn, Patrig, Katell, Yann, Morgann, Adraboran, Maïwenn, Gwendal, Sklérijenn, Gwenn, Diwenza). The law related to the vital records subsequently changed and became less restrictive with the 12 April 1966 Instruction générale relative à l'état civil. Their children were ultimately given by the Court of Justice of the European Union a special identity card as ‘European citizens of Breton nationality’
- Patrig Ar Goarnig (born Patrick Manrot-Le Goarnig), French sculptor, famous for his artwork, Morvarc'h Argol in Argol Parish close which depicts King Gradlon. He is also the son of Jean-Jacques and Mireille Manrot-Le Goarnig.
- Katell Le Goarnig (born Katheline Manrot Le Goarnic), French engraver, illustrator and author and daughter of Jean-Jacques and Mireille Manrot-Le Goarnig.
- Garlonn Le Goarnig (born Garlone Manrot-Le Goarnig), French painter and daughter of Jean-Jacques and Mireille Manrot-Le Goarnig.
- Diwezha Le Goarnig, French rigger and daughter of Jean-Jacques and Mireille Manrot-Le Goarnig.
- Gwendal Le Goarnig, French carpenter and son of Jean-Jacques and Mireille Manrot-Le Goarnig.
- Aziliz Manrow (born Aziliz Manrot-Le Goarnig), French musician and daughter of Gwendal Le Goarnig.
- Gwenn Le Goarnig, Breton music producer and organizer of the first Festival de Kertalg.
- Yseult Le Goarnig, French writer.
