= Yann ar Floc'h =

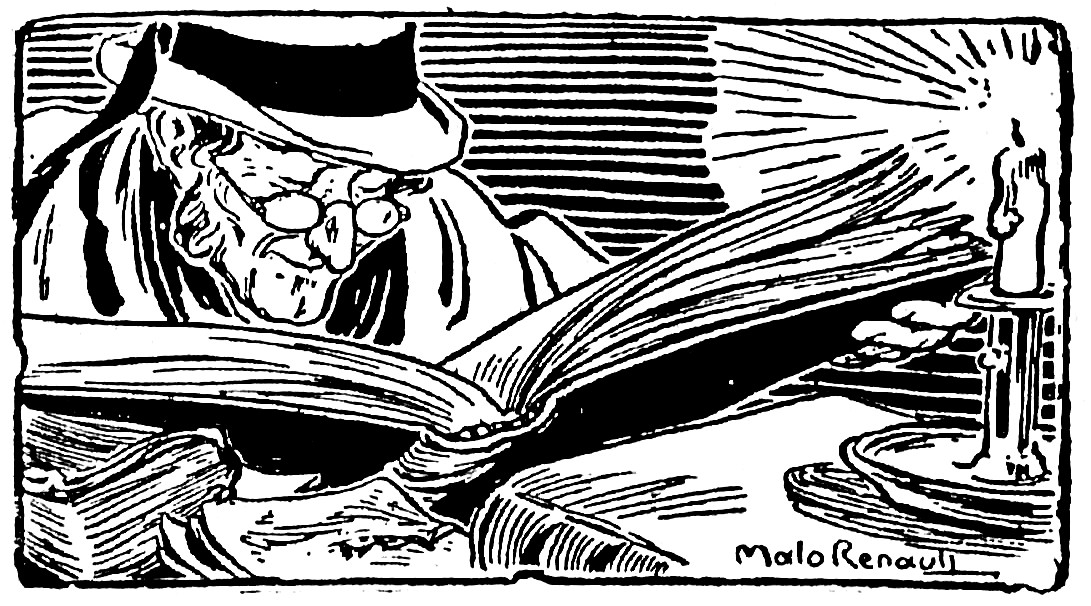
- Detail from the cover of Yann ar Floc'h's Koñchennou eus Bro ar Ster Aon (1950)
- Born: Jean Le Page; February 25, 1881; Pleyben, France
- Died: July 2, 1936 (aged 55); Pleyben, France
- Occupation: Folklorist
- Writing career
- Pen name: Yann ar Floc'h
- Language: Breton
- Notable work: Koñchennou eus Bro ar Ster Aon

Yann ar Floc'h (25 February 1881 – 2 July 1936), pseudonym of Jean Le Page, was a Breton folklorist. He collected the oral traditions of the Aulne region in the department of Finistère and published them in Breton periodicals. He was one of the few folklorists of that time to publish this kind of material in the Breton language. These texts were posthumously published in the collection Koñchennou eus Bro ar Ster Aon ("Folk-tales from the Aulne river country").

== Publication ==
Between 1904 and 1911, he published the various Breton language tales which form the collection Koñchennou eus Bro ar Ster Aon ("Folk-tales from the Aulne river country") in periodicals, particularly Kroaz ar Vretoned and Ar Vro. Notably, Yann ar Floc'h collected in 1905 the longest known oral version of the history of King Mark, a version that is of great interest in the study of this character; it blends the legend of Ys, with the premise that Marc was condemned by Gradlon's daughter Ahès (or Dahut). These tales form "the original narration of folk traditions" and are representative of the renewal of popular Breton literature in prose at the beginning of the 20th century. In 1950, the folktales published in the periodicals were gathered together by Yeun ar Gow and published by Le Dault.

== Editions ==
- Koñchennoù eus Bro ar Stêr Aon. Kemper: Le Dault. 1950.
- Koñchennou euz bro ar ster Aon. Kemper: Emgleo Breiz. 2002. ISBN 9782913860049.

== Sources ==
- Cormerais, Jean (1957). "Review of Koñchennou eus Bro ar Ster Aon". Annales de Bretagne et des pays de l'Ouest (in French). 64: 520.
- Favereau, Francis (2001). Anthologie de la littérature de langue bretonne au XX^{e} siècle: Partie 1900–1918 (in French). Morlaix: Skol Vreizh. ISBN 2911447573.
