= Paul Emmanuel Péraire =

French painter (1819–1893)

Paul-Emmanuel Péraire (September 12, 1819, Bordeaux – January 21, 1893, Paris) was a French landscape painter of the Barbizon school.

== Life ==
He was born in Bordeaux and originally worked as a stockbroker before studying painting under Eugène Isabey and Évariste Vital Luminais. It was not until he was nearly forty years old that he began to show his works which usually depict landscape or architectural subjects. He exhibited at the Salon from 1866 to 1892.

He received a bronze medal at the Salon of 1880 for his painting The Seine at Saint-Dennis and his work L'Etang à Mortefontaine, effet du matin (Morning Effect. Lake at Mortefontaine) was much praised at the Salon of 1881. His pictures show the influence of Corot and the other Barbizon masters. The Musée des beaux-arts at Bagnères-de-Bigorre holds one of his works and two drawings are held by the Louvre.

Among his chief pictures are:

- Le moulin des Andelys
- Le Château Gaillard aux Andelys
- L'Etang à Mortefontaine, effet du matin (1881)
- Un coup de vent
- Village au bord de l'eau
- Vue des bords de l´Oise
