= Ys =

Mythical city of Brittany in western France

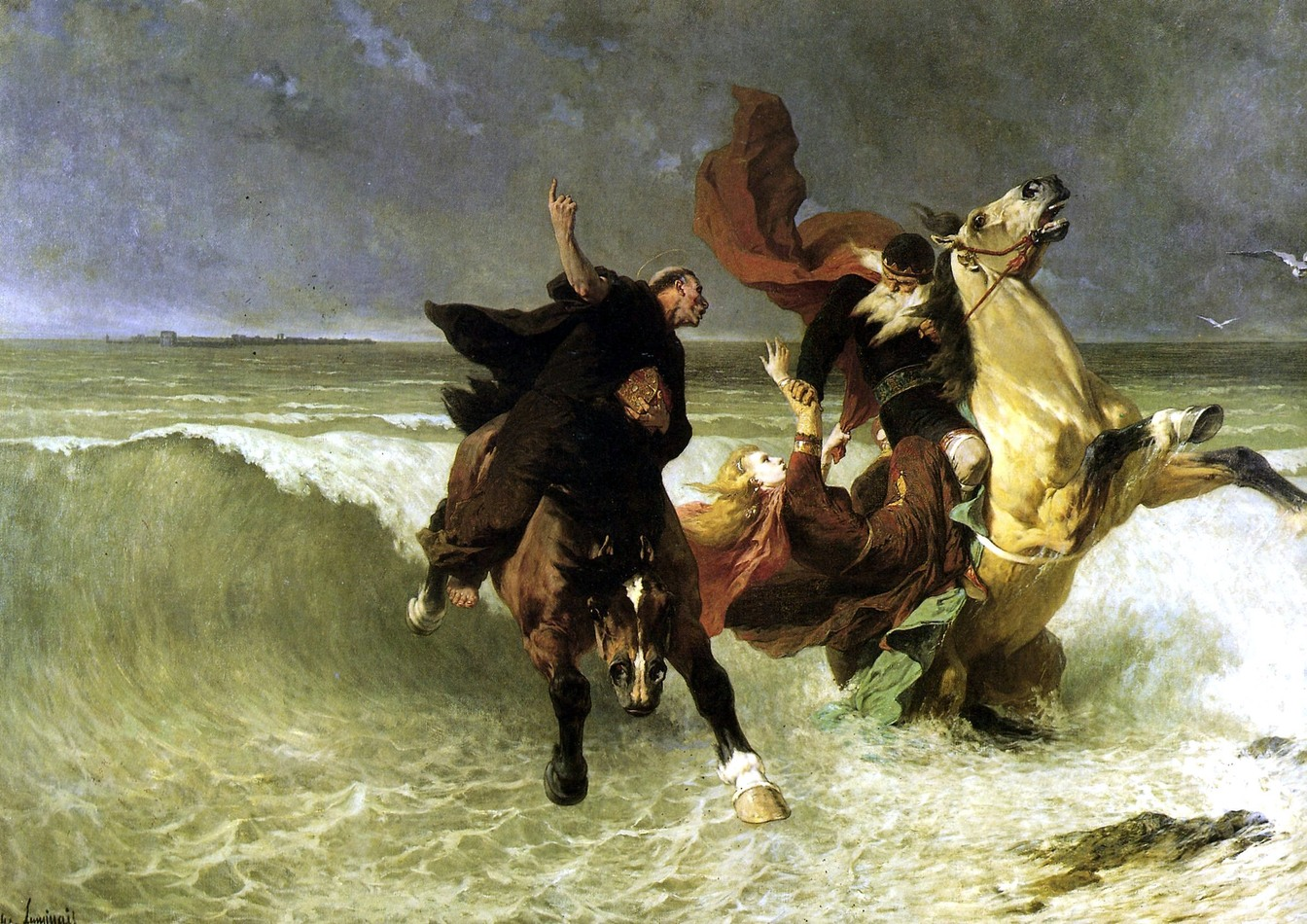
Flight of King Gradlon, by E. V. Luminais, 1884 (Musée des Beaux-Arts, Quimper)

Ys (pronounced /ˈiːs/ EESS), also spelled Is or Kêr-Is in Breton, and Ville d'Ys ("City of Ys") in French, is a mythical city on the coast of Brittany that was swallowed up by the ocean. Most versions of the legend place the city in the Baie de Douarnenez.

== Etymology ==
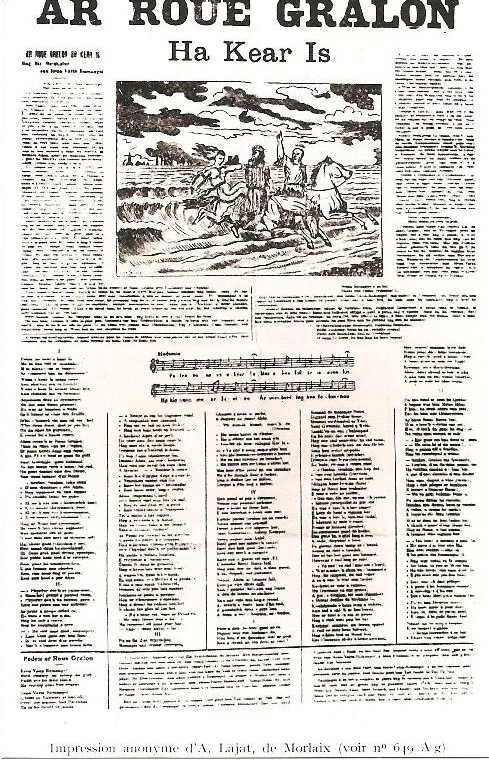
Lyrics and sheet music for the Breton gwerz "Ar Roue Gralon ha Kear Is" ("King Gradlon and the City of Ys", 1850). This uses the archaic spelling Kear Is for the city of Ys.

In the original Breton, the city receives the name of Kêr Ys, which translates as "low city". Kêr is the Breton word for "city", and is related to the Welsh caer, Cornish ker- and more distantly the Irish cathair, while Ys/Is is related to Welsh isel, Scottish Gaelic ìosal and Irish íseal ("low").

== The legend ==
Different versions of the legend share several basic common elements. King Gradlon (Gralon in Breton) ruled in Ys, a city built on land reclaimed from the sea, sometimes described as rich in commerce and the arts, with Gradlon's palace being made of marble, cedar and gold. In some versions, Gradlon built the city upon the request of his daughter Dahut, who loved the sea. To protect Ys from inundation, a dike was built with a gate that was opened for ships during low tide. The one key that opened the gate was held by the king.

Most versions of the legend present Gradlon as a pious man, and his daughter, Princess Dahut, as wayward. Dahut (sometimes called Ahez) is often presented as frivolous and an unrepentant sinner, or, sometimes, as a sorceress. However, in another version, that of an ancient ballad, Gradlon himself is blamed by his people for extravagances of every kind.

In most variations, Dahut acquires the key to the dikes from Gradlon, and its misuse leads to catastrophe. Commonly, Dahut steals the keys (made either of silver or gold) from her father while he sleeps, either to allow her lover inside for a banquet or after being persuaded to do so by her flattering lover. She opens the gates of the dikes, either in a wine-induced folly or by mistake, believing she is opening the city gates.

The sea inundates the city, killing everyone but the king. A Saint (either St. Gwénnolé or St. Corentin) wakes the sleeping king and urges him to flee. The king mounts his horse and takes his daughter with him. As the water is about to overtake him, a voice calls out: "Throw the demon thou carriest into the sea, if thou dost not desire to perish." Dahut falls from the horse's back, and Gradlon is saved. In Le Braz's version, it is Gradlon himself who throws her off on St. Gwénnolé's orders.

In some versions, after falling into the sea, Dahut becomes a morgen or mermaid who continues haunting the sea, and can be seen combing her golden hair and singing sad songs. Some 19th-century folklorists also collected old beliefs that said during low tides the ruins of Ys could be seen, or the sound of its carillon could be heard.

In Le Grand's version, St. Gwénnolé goes to see Gradlon and warns him about the sins being committed in the city, which is absorbed in luxury, debauchery and vanity. God has warned St. Gwénnolé that he is going to punish the city, and the Saint tells the king to flee since God's wrath is about to fall upon the city. The king flees the city on horseback. A storm falls upon the city and quickly inundates it. The main culprit is Princess Dahut, the king's indecent daughter, who has stolen the key, symbol of royalty, from around her father's neck. Gradlon takes refuge in Quimper.

Other versions of the legend tell that Ys was founded more than 2,000 years before Gradlon's reign in a then-dry location off the current coast of the Bay of Douarnenez, but the Breton coast had slowly given way to the sea so that Ys was under it at each high tide when Gradlon's reign began.

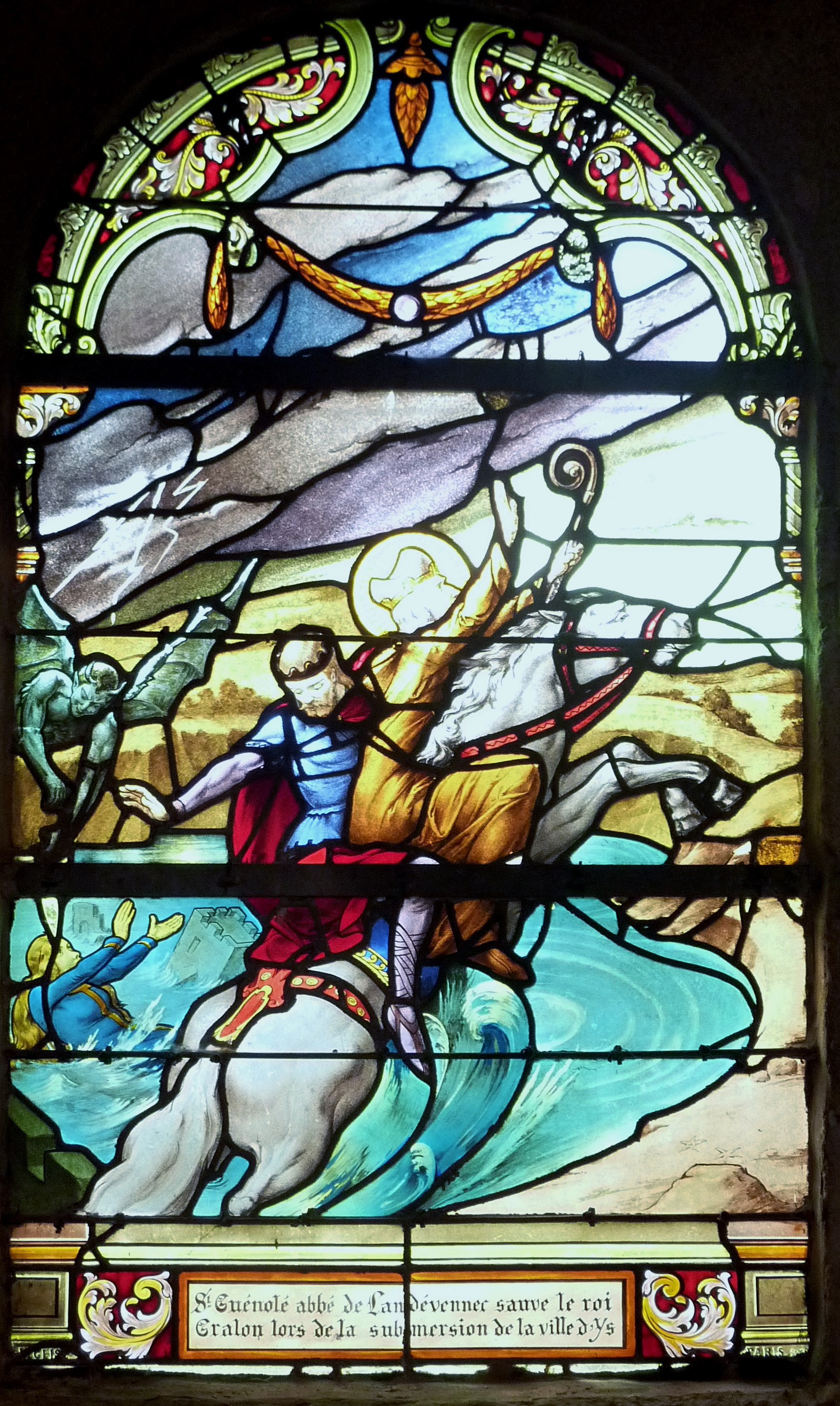
Stained glass window by Gabriel Léglise representing "Saint Guénolé, abbé de Landévennec, sauvant le roi Gradlon lors de la submersion de la ville d'Ys" Church of Saint-Germain Kerlaz.

== Development of the legend ==
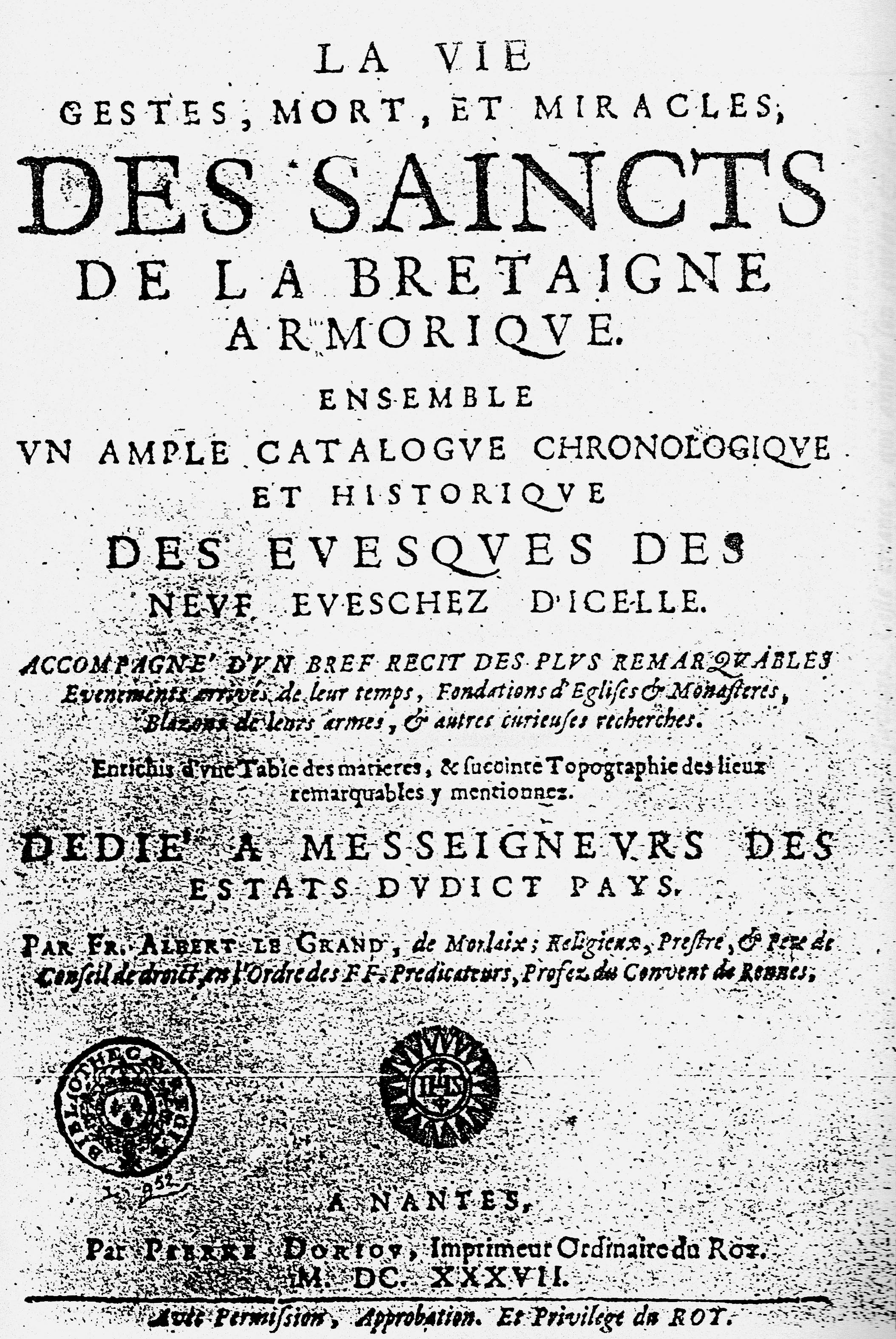
Title page of the first edition of La Vie des saincts de la Bretaigne armorique by Albert Le Grand, 1636

While legends and literature about Gradlon are much older, the story of Ys appears to have developed between the end of the fifteenth century and the seventeenth century. An early mention of Ys appears in Pierre Le Baud's Cronicques et ystoires des Bretons (1480) in which Gradlon is the king of the city, but Dahut is not mentioned. Bertrand d'Argentré's La histoire de Bretagne and mystery plays on the life of St. Winwaloe, in the sixteenth century, also provide early references to the city.

Albert Le Grand's Vie des Saincts de la Bretagne Armorique, third edition published in 1680, contains all the basic elements of the later story including the first known mention of Dahut.

In a version published in 1707, Ys is further punished after its fall beneath the waves. In this story, Saint Martin is told by that, in order to perpetuate Ys' punishment, God allows the church bells to still be heard at the bottom of the ocean, and a storm is located above Ys' former location at all times. Additionally, in the place where Ys was located, there is an island upon which is placed an obelisk that blocks the entrance to the chasm where the waters of Lake Grand-Lieu came from, and the chasm is a prison for a giant whose roars can still be heard.

=== Literary versions ===
In 1839, T. Hersart de la Villemarqué published a collection of popular songs collected from oral tradition, the Barzaz Breizh. The collection achieved a wide distribution and brought Breton folk culture into European awareness. In the second edition, the poem "Livaden Geris" ("The Submersion of Ker-Is") appeared. The same basic story elements are present and, in this version, Dahut steals the key at the incitement of a lover.

Villemarqué studied several versions of the song and created his song using the best material from each. As a result, his song mentions several traditions. In the Stanza V, it mentions King Gradlon's horse that can only be heard once a year during the Black Night, a detail he may have borrowed from Lai de Graelent, probably written in the late 12th century. Also, the last verses of the song mention a fisherman seeing a mermaid combing her hair and singing a sad song. The mermaid is Dahut transformed into a morgen, which references another tradition. It also appears that elements of the text of this version were adapted from the medieval Welsh poem about the legend of Cantre'r Gwaelod, a very similar Welsh legend about a land that disappeared beneath the ocean as a result of human error. The poem appears in the Black Book of Carmarthen, which Villemarqué had studied at Jesus College, Oxford, in 1839. Villemarqué wrongly considered the Welsh spoken in the sixth century as the same as the Breton spoken in his days.

In 1844, Emile Souvestre told a version of the legend in his work Le Foyer breton. In the tale "Keris", the character of the Devil disguised as a man with a red beard appeared. His version may have come from a different oral source. His telling also played a great part in making the legend widely known, and many 19th century English tellings of the story are closely derived from this version.

In the early 1890s, Édouard Schuré's essay Les Grandes légendes de France introduced the character of Malgven, a sorceress who was Gradlon's wife and Dahut's mother. Malgven appeared in many subsequent retellings, including Charles Guyot's La Légende de la ville d'Ys d'après les anciens textes (1926). Guyot named Gradlon's horse Morvarc'h and wrote that the horse was a gift from Malgven.

A novel by Norman Douglas, They Went (1920), is based upon the Breton legend.

=== Oral versions ===
In 1893, Anatole Le Braz collected a fragmentary version of the legend in his book La Légende de la mort en Basse-Bretagne, and its posterior 1902 augmented edition La Légende de la mort chez les Bretons armoricains This version also mentions Dahut's (here called Ahés) transformation into a mermaid but, unlike other versions, here Dahut is thrown off the horse by king Gralon himself, on orders from St. Gwénolé.

Paul Sébillot also collected oral versions among his extensive review of the history of the legend in the second volume of his 1905 book Le folk-lore de France

=== English language versions ===
In 1917, Scottish folklorist Lewis Spence included the legend of Ys among the tales told in his book Legends & Romances of Brittany. One year later, Jonathan Ceredig Davies published a short version of the legend in the 29th issue of the Folklore journal. A few years later, in 1929, Elsie Masson also included it in her book Folk Tales of Brittany, citing Souvestre and Le Braz among her sources.

The science fiction and fantasy writer Poul Anderson and his wife Karen Anderson published the novel The King of Ys in four volumes (1986–1988): Roma Mater, Gallicenae, Dahut, and The Dog and the Wolf. Their version portrays Gradlon as a Roman centurion, Gratillonius, sent to be the prefect of Ys.

The Daughters of Ys (2020) by M. T. Anderson and Jo Rioux is based on the folktale. The graphic novel's adaptation follows Dahut's perspective of the events leading to the destruction of Ys.

=== The devil in Souvestre's version ===
Émile Souvestre's telling differs from the tale in several points. Ys was still protected by dikes, whose gates were opened for ships at certain moments, but it was Dahut herself who kept the silver keys of the dikes around her neck. Dahut was a sorceress and had embellished the city with the help of the korrigans, which built works men could not make. With her magic, Dahut also tamed the sea dragons, and gave one to each inhabitant of the city, which they used to go find rare goods or to reach their enemies' vessels.

The citizens were so wealthy that they measured out grain with silver hanaps (goblets), but their wealth had also turned them vicious and harsh. Beggars had been chased from the city like beasts; the church had been abandoned, and the citizens spent all day and night entertaining themselves at the inns, dance halls and performances, while Dahut herself threw parties at her palace all day long. St. Corentin warned Gradlon that God's patience with the city was at an end, but the King had lost his power, living alone in one wing of the palace, and Dahut ignored the Saint's warning.

One day, a bearded prince dressed in red came to Ys, and seduced Dahut and her friends with his compliments and sweet words. He proposed to them to dance a new kind of branle, and he played the tune on his bagpipe, sending everyone into a frenzy. He took advantage of the situation to steal the dikes' keys from Dahut and, taking his true appearance as the demon, used them to open all the dikes, allowing the sea to flood the city.

St. Corentin appeared in Gradlon's chambers and urged him to flee. He mounted his black horse and ran. When he passed Dahut's castle, she threw herself on her father's horse, but the horse stopped suddenly. St. Corentin told the King to push Dahut off the horse, but Gradlon could not do it. So it was Corentin himself who hit her with his crozier to make her fall off into the sea. The horse ran again, taking the king to safety. When Gradlon looked back, from the ruins of the city the demon mockingly showed him the silver keys.

== Ys' return ==
A few legends speak of Ys' resurrection. Le Braz mentions one which says that, on the day it happens, the first person who sees the church's spire or hears the sound of its bells will become king of the city and all of its territory.

There is another legend told in a Breton saying, that when Paris is swallowed, the city of Ys will rise up from under the waves (in Breton, Par Is means "similar to Ys"):

Pa vo beuzet Paris Ec'h adsavo Ker Is	When Paris will be engulfed Will re-emerge the City of Ys

== Adaptations in the arts ==
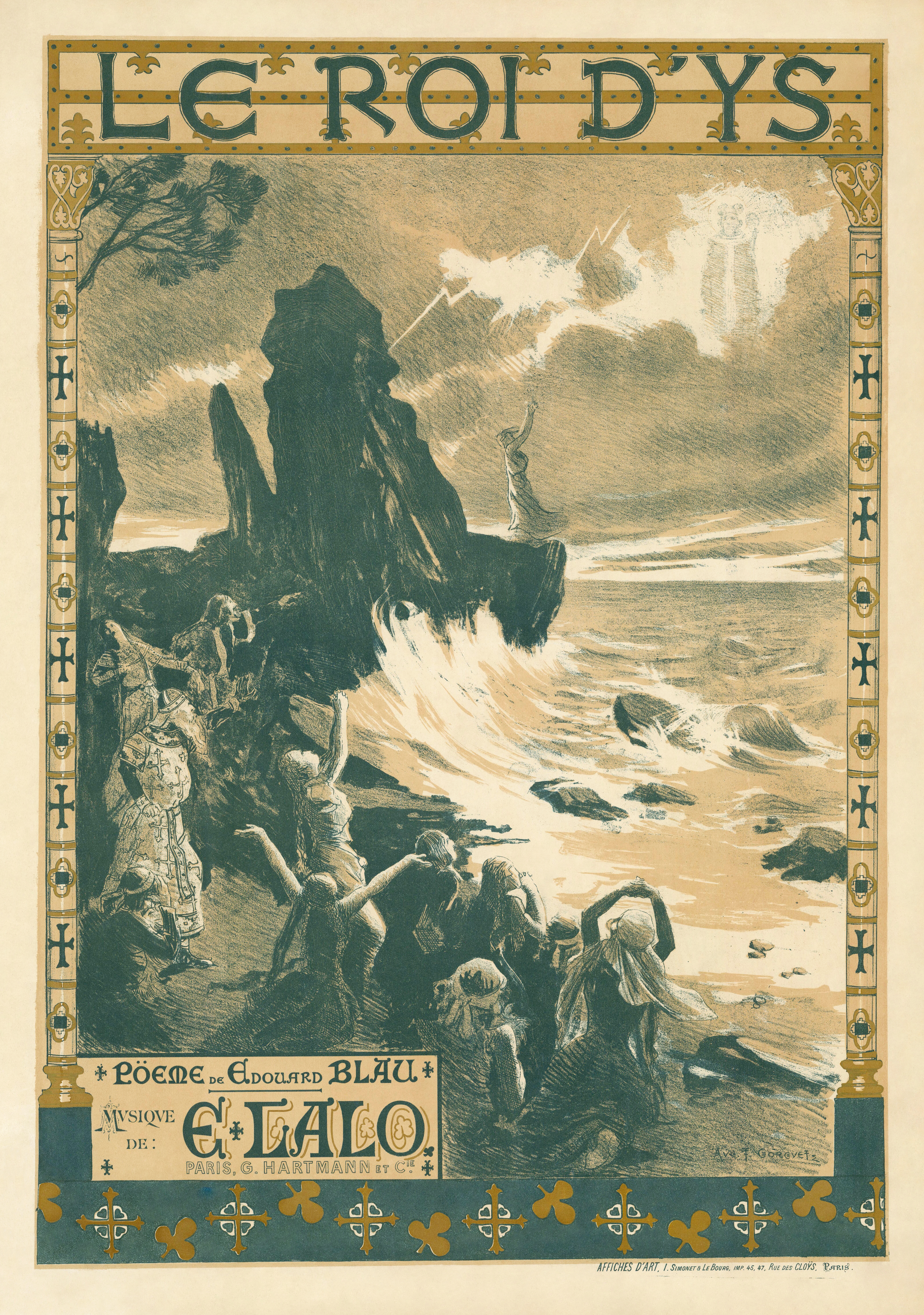
Poster for Édouard Lalo's 1888 opera, Le roi d'Ys

Several famous artistic adaptations of the Ys legend appeared in the late 19th and early 20th century. E. V. Luminais' painting Flight of King Gradlon, depicting Gradlon's escape from Ys, scored a success at the Salon of 1884.

Video games from the Ys series, mainly Ys I: Ancient Ys Vanished, Ys II: Ancient Ys Vanished – The Final Chapter and Ys Origin, are loosely inspired by this legend. However, in them, Ys is portrayed as a floating island.

In Jack Vance's Lyonesse Trilogy, Ys is a city of the Elder Isles, an archipelago situated west of France. It lies on the western coast of Hybras, the largest of the isles (identified as the Hy-Brasil of Irish myth). The city is extremely ancient. In the endnotes, Vance states that a land bridge once connected the Elder Isles to the European mainland (presumably during the Pleistocene Ice Age); when the first modern humans crossed to the Elder Isles, they discovered the city of Ys already in existence.

=== Music ===
Le roi d'Ys, an opera by the French composer Édouard Lalo which premiered in 1888, transforms the story significantly, replacing the figure of Dahut with Margared, whose motive for opening the gates (with the aid of her own betrothed Karnac) is her jealousy at her sister Rozenn's marriage to Mylio (characters who are also inventions of Lalo).

Also inspired by the story of Ys is Claude Debussy's La cathédrale engloutie, found in his first book of Preludes (published 1910). This is a prelude intended to evoke the atmosphere of the legend by its sound.

In 1929 M.C. Escher made a woodcut print inspired by Debussy's piece, also titled "La cathédrale engloutie".

Alan Stivell's album Renaissance of the Celtic Harp opens with a track entitled "Ys". Harpist Joanna Newsom titled her sophomore album Ys after the mythical city. The story of Ys also inspired a 1972 album of the same name by the Italian progressive rock band Il Balletto di Bronzo.

Cornish composer William Lewarne Harris wrote his third and largest opera, The Sunken City, about "Ker-ys". The three-act, prologue and epilogue opera, completed in 1992, has not been publicly performed, but there are many private recordings of excerpts.

== Historicity ==
In 2025, marine archaeologists discovered submerged ruins near Sein Island, approximately six miles from the Bay of Douarnenez. They speculate that a real-world city lost to rising sea levels would have been memorable to local peoples, and that the myth of Ys might be based on this sunken settlement.

== See also ==
- Lyonesse - semi-mythical inundated land off the tip of Cornwall.
- Cantre'r Gwaelod - Welsh legend of a sunken kingdom
- List of mythological places
