= Dahut =

Princess in Breton legend and literature

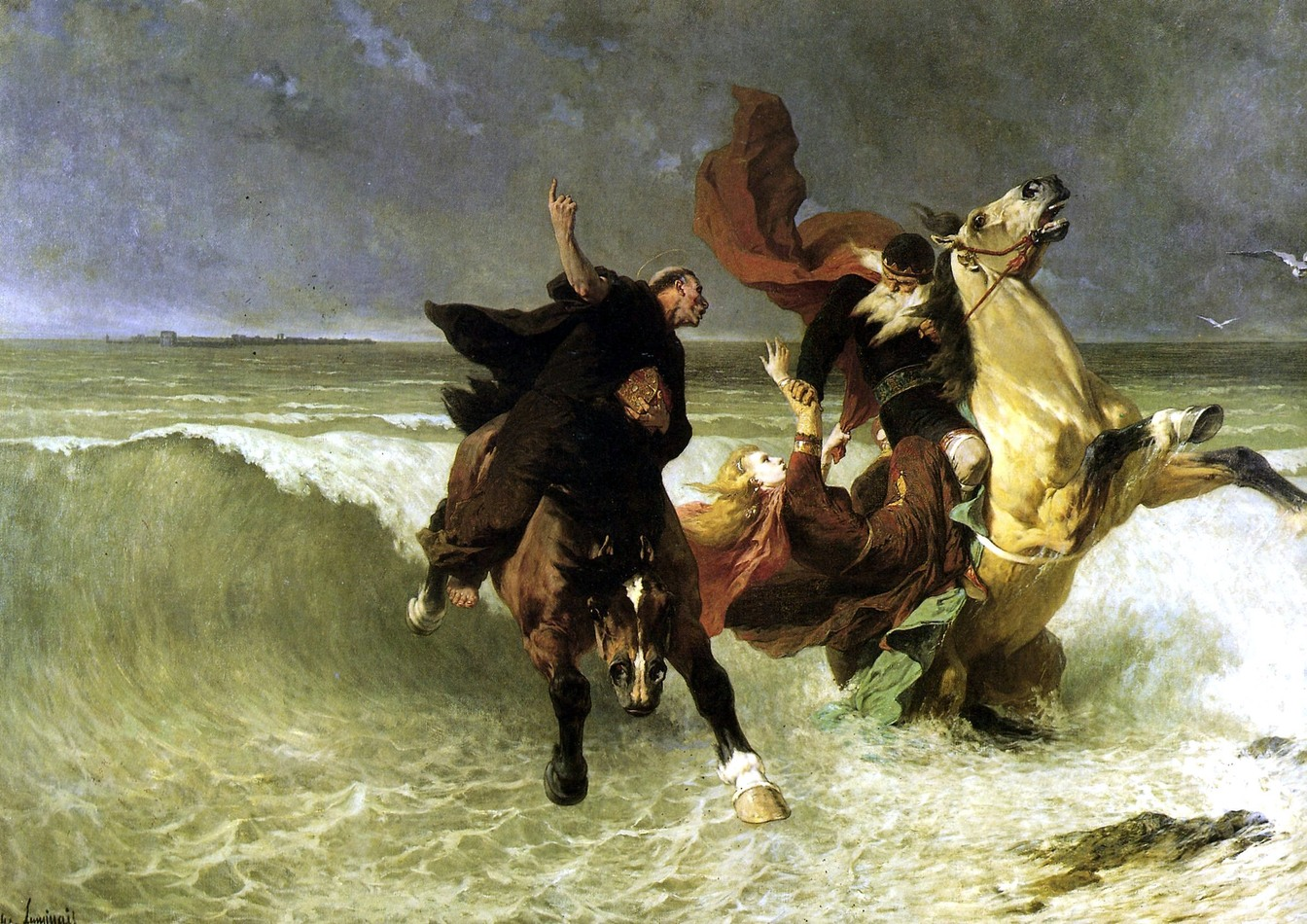
Gradlon's flight by Évariste Vital Luminais

Dahut, also spelled Dahud, is a princess in Breton legend and literature, associated with the legend of the drowned city of Ys.

== Etymology ==
From Old Breton da, "good" (cf. Welsh da, same meaning), and hud, "magic" (cf. Welsh hud, same meaning). Amy Varin suggests that Dahud was given the name Ahes due to confusion with "alc'hwez" (key).

== Legend of Ys ==
Dating to the 15th century, the earliest mentions of Ys and its king, Gradlon, do not mention Gradlon's daughter Dahut, and the king himself is to blame for the destruction of the city. Dahut was first mentioned in the third edition of Albert Le Grand's Vie des Saincts de la Bretagne Armorique (1680). In this early version, the "shameless" Dahut intends to kill her father and steals the key which symbolizes his royalty. Her wickedness causes a storm which floods Ys, and she dies in the destruction.

In most retellings, the city of Ys is protected from floods by a dike, with King Gradlon possessing the keys to its gate. His daughter, Dahut, is a wicked and lustful young woman. In some versions she has many lovers, whom she murders, until the Devil himself comes to seduce her. Dahut steals the silver or gold keys, and during her carousing with her lover winds up opening the gate. The sea floods the city. A saint, either St. Gwénnolé or St. Corentin, wakes Gradlon and warns him. Gradlon attempts to flee on his horse with Dahut riding behind him, but the water almost overtakes him. He either throws Dahut off or she falls off. As soon as Dahut falls into the water, Gradlon is able to escape to safety. The ruins of Ys can still be seen and its bells can be heard underwater. In some versions, Dahut transforms into a Mari-morgan or mermaid who haunts the area and can still be heard singing.

Some renditions add the story of Dahut's mother, a sorceress or Valkyrie named Malgven who may have died in childbirth. It is debated how much of this story is traditional, with the first known mention of Malgven coming from Édouard Schuré's essay Les Grandes légendes de France in the 1890s.

== Other legends ==
In one legend, King Mark of Cornwall was hunting and shot an arrow at a white doe. The doe transformed into the beautiful Ahès, daughter of Gradlon, who gave Mark the ears and the mane of his horse Morvarc'h as punishment. This variant seems to have originated with a story collected by Yann ar Floc'h in 1905 which combined the stories of Mark and Ys. Other versions of the Mark legend do not include Dahut.

"Ahez" appears in the Breton folktale Kristof, a variant of the fairytale "The Lazy Boy" (Aarne-Thompson type ATU 675) recorded in 1870. Kristof, the lazy son of a fisherman, catches a talking fish which allows him to wish for whatever he wants. Kristof travels to the city of Ys and uses his powers to uproot and ride an oak tree. When Princess Ahez mocks him, Kristof wishes that she would become pregnant; his wish comes true and she bears a son. With help from a druid, King Gradlon identifies Kristof as the baby's father. He puts Kristof, Ahez and the child into a wooden chest and sets them out to sea, but Kristof uses the fish's power to create an island and mansion far more wealthy than Gradlon's. Impressed, Gradlon offers to let the three of them return to Ys, but Kristof refuses and predicts that the city of Ys will be destroyed by the next high tide, due to the loss of the oak tree. Matthieu Boyd notes the general scholarly consensus that this tale is a literary creation, and interprets Kristof as a Christian figure who ends the pre-Christian society of Ys.

Ahès is sometimes attributed with building roads in Brittany and her name is connected to Carhaix, "Ker Ahès" (city of Ahès). However, some scholars argue that her name instead derived from the town. In a medieval tradition, Ahès is the name of an ancient woman who builds roads.

== References in the arts ==
French singer Nolwenn Leroy recorded a song titled "Ahès" on her 2012 album Ô Filles de l'Eau.

Modern authors and artists such as Patrig ar Goarnig have sometimes interpreted Dahut as a heroic pagan figure.

Dahut is a primary character in M.T. Anderson's graphic novel, The Daughters of Ys (2020). In this adaptation, Dahut manages her father's kingdom and is forced to use sorcery to protect the city of Ys. Her sister and the kingdom's heir, Rozenn, acts as a foil for Dahut. As the novel progresses, the destruction of Ys is due in part to Dahut's continued use of sorcery as well as the inaction of King Gradlon and Princess Rozenn.

== See also ==
- Cantre'r Gwaelod
- Lí Ban
- Morgan le Fay
- Peruonto
