= Corentin of Quimper =

5th-century Breton saint

Saint Corentin of Quimper
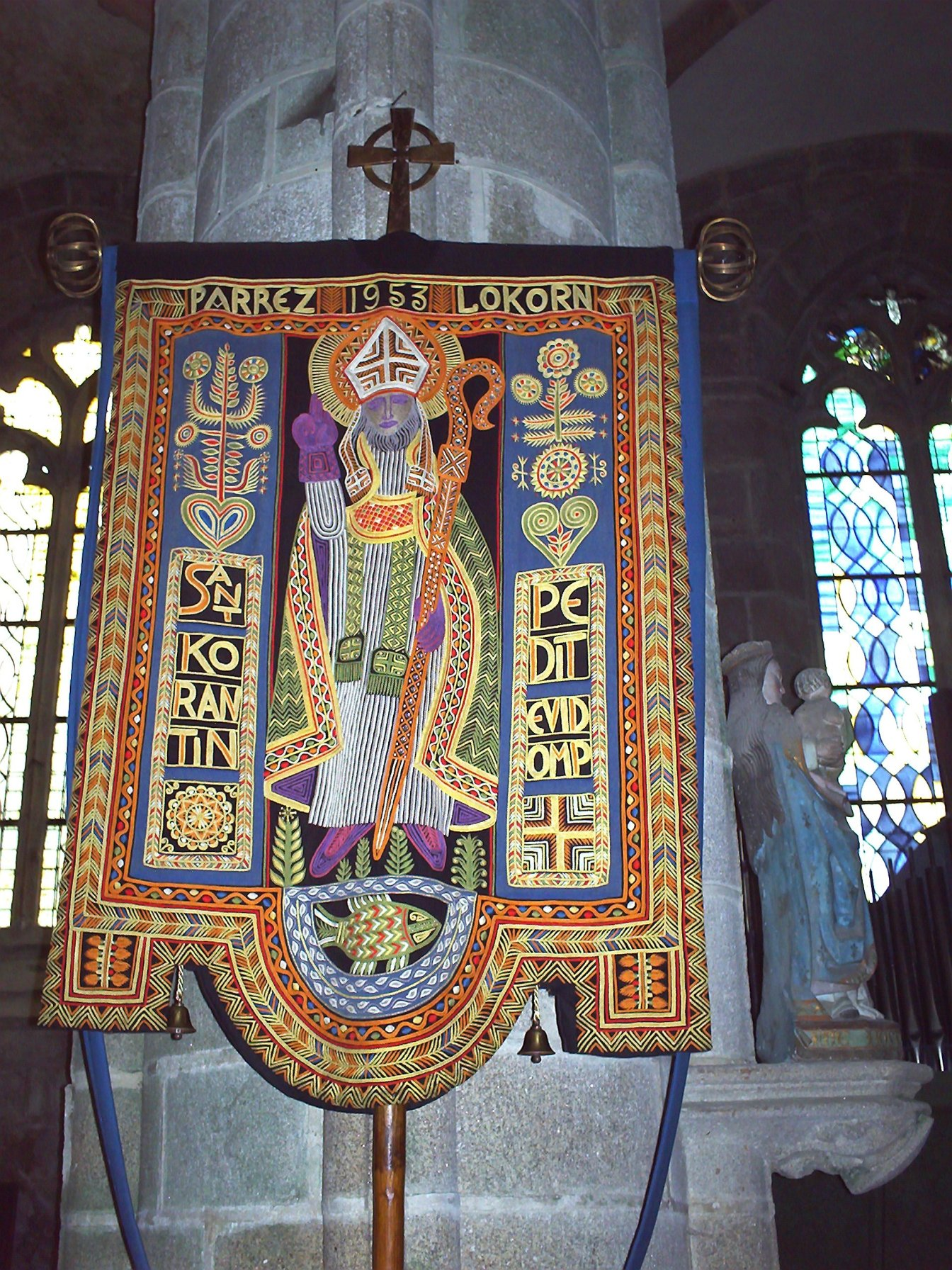
- St Corentin, pictured on the banner of the parish church of Locronan, Brittany.
- Born: c. 4th century AD; Cornouaille
- Died: c. 460 AD; Quimper
- Venerated in: Catholic Church, Eastern Orthodox Church
- Major shrine: Quimper
- Feast: December 12
- Attributes: fish; episcopal attire
- Patronage: Cornouaille

Corentin of Quimper (Corentinus; in Breton, Kaourintin) (born 4th century AD - died 460 AD) is a Breton saint. He was the first bishop of Quimper. Corentin was a hermit at Plomodiern and was regarded as one of the seven founding saints of Brittany. He is the patron saint of Cornouaille, Brittany, and is also the patron saint of seafood. His feast day is December 12.

== History and tradition ==
Corentin is one of the "Seven Saints" who evangelized Brittany. The others are: Tugdual de Tréguier, Paterne de Vannes, Samson of Dol, Pol de Léon, Malo and Brieuc. The Tro Breiz, which in Breton means "tour of Brittany", is a Catholic pilgrimage that connects the cities of the seven legendary saints of Brittany, monks from Wales and Cornwall who brought Christianity to Armorica and founded the first bishoprics in the fifth century and sixth century.

Corentin's life is told in the book Vita de saint Corentin, written by Dom Plaine around 1220–1235. This publication was revised and comments were added to it, particularly after the discovery of a book called The Ancient Life of Saint Corentin. The song of Aiquin also evokes his life.

According to Albert le Grand, Corentin was born in a region called Cornouaille armoricaine. He became a hermit in the city of Plomodiern, adjacent to Ménez-Hom, where he was already changing lives through his devotion to people. His selflessness was renowned across France, and through the medium of scriptures and word of mouth, his humanitarianism was recognised in Europe also.

Legend has it that near where he was living, a miraculous fish would present itself to Corentin in a fountain. He would cut a small piece of the fish to feed himself, and that piece would regrow (he would otherwise feed himself with herbs and roots found in the forest).

When King Gradlon decided to create the diocese of Quimper, he called on Corentin and asked him to become the first bishop. He sent Corentin to the city of Tours so that he could be consecrated by Martin of Tours. He was accompanied by his disciples, Guénolé, founder of Landévennec Abbey, and Tudy.

Gradlon also gave him a palace on the location where the Quimper Cathedral now stands.

After his death, he was buried in front of the altar of the Quimper Cathedral. An abbey was dedicated to him in 1201 by King Philippe Auguste, near Mantes; it was called Saint Corentin Abbey.

He is also known in Cornwall, where St. Corentine's Church, Cury is dedicated to him.

== Legend of Ys ==
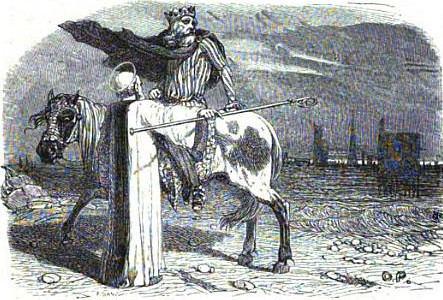
Gradlon et Corentin

In the Breton legend of the city of Ys, Corentin is the saint who observed the fall of Ys and warned King Gradlon of the sin committed by his daughter, Dahut (Ahes). The Christianization of the Celts was concurrent with the fall of Rome, and so the mercy of Corentin towards Gradlon symbolized the cultural transition. Prior to Christianity, the Celtic lifestyle was based around estuarine aquaculture dependent upon the pattern of the tides. In lowland environments where flooding is a major hazard, megaliths served as an astronomical calendar to predict the movement of water. Coastal Celts (also called Armoricans) used a system of dikes and locks to provide irrigation on an alternating basis, allowing separate plots of land to switch between producing cereals and shellfish. Corentin is a patron saint of seafood and, through him, inland aquaculture demonstrates the sustainability of Celtic Christianity over prior practices.

Later tales blamed the caprice of Princess Dahut for the cataclysm at Ys. Some tales refer to her as a descendant of faeries sent to beguile King Gradlon into ruin. Others depict her as a princess seduced by the devil into opening the floodgates. The tales share a common plot point: King Gradlon and Princess Dahut magically escaping to shore on horseback where they are waylaid by Corentin, (or in some versions Guénolé) who decries the excess of Dahut, causing her to fall into the water and become a morgen or siren.

Corentin then absconds to his hermitage while the king embarks on a hunting party. Gradlon becomes lost and hungry enough to request food when he stumbles upon Corentin's hermitage. Corentin offers the king a morsel of his miraculous, regenerative fish, symbolizing the gift of Christianity.

== Iconography ==
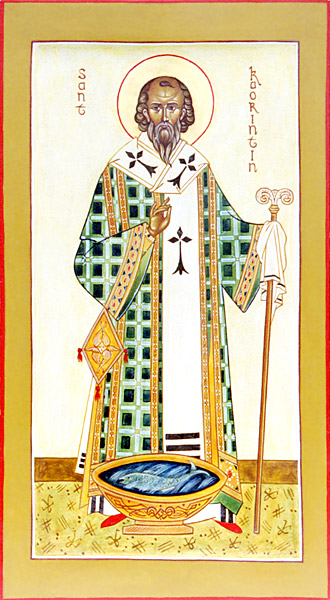
The 20th-century icon of Saint Corentin (with his attribute, the fish), painted for the Saint Anne Orthodox Association (Brittany).

He is represented with a whole fish or a half of fish (reminder of the fish he shared with the hunter) that he holds in his hand or at his feet where he is sometimes associated with a fountain.

== See also ==
- Argol Parish close
- Julian Maunoir, "Apostle of Brittany"
