= Lí Ban (TV series) =

Irish animated show

- Genre: Anime
- Created by: Gráinne McGuinness; Máire Zepf
- Based on: Lí Ban
- Written by: Máire Zepf
- Voices of: Lí Ban: Sadbh Breathnach; Con: Jude Petticrew
- Country of origin: Ireland
- Original language: Irish
- No. of seasons: 1
- No. of episodes: 13

Production
- Producers: Claire Handley; Jude Petticrew
- Production company: Paper Owl Films

Original release
- Network: TG4; Cúla4
- Release: 15 October 2024 – present

Lí Ban is a Northern Irish anime-inspired animated series produced by Claire Handley and Jude Petticrew. Heavily inspired by the story of Lí Ban, the series follows the titular 12-year-old character and her dog Con as they mysteriously transform into a mermaid and a sea otter. As they explore the deep sea in search of answers, they encounter gods, monsters, giants, and wily humans. The series debuted on both TG4 and Cúla4 on 15 October 2024, and was also made available for streaming on Cúla4's website. It is distributed internationally by Aardman.

A Welsh language dub of the series was broadcast on S4C.

The series was made with funding support from Coimisiún na Meán and Northern Ireland Screen's Screen Fund, and the Irish Language Broadcast Fund.

The series consists of 13 episodes, each of which are 11 minutes long.
