= André Le Ruyet =

French poet and writer (1932–2021)

- Born: 2 December 1932; Saint-Denis, France
- Died: 9 April 2021 (aged 88)
- Occupations: Poet; Writer

André Le Ruyet (2 December 1932 – 9 April 2021) was a French poet and writer of Breton origin.

== Biography ==
The son of a Breton language storyteller, Le Ruyet wrote short stories, poems, and novels, imbued with Breton fantasy stories. In the working-class suburbs of Paris, he joined the Young Christian Workers. After a long career with Nouvelles Messageries de la Presse Parisienne, he returned to his fatherland of Brittany and started his work on short stories and novels.

Le Ruyet received the Prix Corbière for his book Morvarc'h, the Prix des Écrivains bretons for Itinéraire de Paris à Kernascléden and the Prix Bernard Moitessier for Spectralement vôtre. His book Itinéraire de Paris à Kernascléden discusses his life and his family, Bretons of the Bro Pourlet who emigrated to Paris, which is a common experience for millions of Bretons across France. He was awarded the Prix de la Fédération des Bretons de Paris in 2005.

Le Ruyet was a member of the Association des Écrivains Bretons and the Association "Emergences Littéraires et Artistiques" for the promotion of Breton literature. He also contributed to the radio station Audio ELAÏG.

André Le Ruyet died on 9 April 2021 at the age of 88.

== Bibliography ==
- Sklérigenn (1993)
- Morvac’h, cheval de mer (1998)
- Malle en vrac (2002)
- Du rififi au gagatorium (2005)
- Itinéraire de Paris à Kernascléden (2005)
- Pavés et Bleuets (2006)
- Spectralement vôtre (2008)
- Le chasseur de touristes (2016)
