= Morgen (mythological creature) =

Welsh and Breton water spirits that drown men

Morgens, morgans, or mari-morgans are Welsh and Breton water spirits that drown men.

== Etymology ==
The name may derive from Mori-genos or Mori-gena, meaning "sea-born. The name has also been rendered as Muri-gena or Murigen.

The name may also be cognate with the Irish Muirgen, an alternate name of Lí Ban, a princess who was transformed into a mermaid when her city was flooded. The Cornish term for a mermaid is usually Morvoren, as in the Mermaid of Zennor.

== Welsh and English legend ==
The oldest occurrence of the name is in Geoffrey of Monmouth's Vita Merlini, where the ruler of Avalon is referred to as "Morgen". As such, the origin of Morgan le Fay may be connected to these Breton myths. The medievalist Lucy Allen Paton argues against this, stating that the Welsh name Morgen was pronounced "Morien" in the twelfth century, and that aside from living on an island, Morgan le Fay was not associated with the sea until later literature.

Controversial English folklorist Ruth Tongue collected several tales with the term "sea-morgan," as in "The Sea Morgan and the Conger Eels" and "The Sea-Morgan's Baby," attributed to western Somerset, in which a fisherman adopts an infant morgan who grows up to return to the ocean. Sea-morgan is a direct translation of the Breton "mari-morgan." A parallel tale comes from Brittany, where the child is called a Mary Morgan.

== Breton legend ==
In Brittany, the formation "mari-morgan" or "mary-morgan" is common. Sébillot compared the Mari Morgan to mermaids or, in French, "sirènes," although without fish tails. They lured sailors with their hypnotic voices and sat in the water to comb their hair seductively. They were believed to live near coasts, at cave entrances and at the mouths of rivers, with some held to still inhabit a cave near Crozon. The mari-morgans, who were well-versed in evil spells, would drag young men underwater and the men would never be seen again. In some versions, however, Mari Morgans carried kidnapped sailors to underwater palaces of mother-of-pearl and crystal, and married them. The morgens, eternally young, are also blamed for heavy flooding that destroys crops or villages.

One example was the princess Dahut or Ahes, who betrayed the city of Ys and caused it to flood, and as punishment was transformed into a Mari-Morgen. Paul Sébillot wrote that she was the progenitor of the mermaid race.

In a parallel tradition from Ushant, an island off the coast of Brittany, are legends of beautiful water-dwelling little people known as morganed (male plural) and morganezed (female plural). In one story, an ugly old morgen king kidnapped a human girl to be his bride, but she fell in love with his handsome young son who helped her escape. In another tale, the morganed people helped the Virgin Mary with the infant Jesus and received the blessing of beauty, while in another the morganezed habitually dried their golden treasures on the sunlit beach and might give some to humans.

== See also ==
- the Morrígan
- Bucca (mythological creature)
- Mermaid
- Merman
- Kelpie
- Lí Ban (mermaid)
- Melusine
- Morgan le Fay
- Selkie
- Siren
- Merrow
