= Évariste Vital Luminais =

French painter (1821–1896)

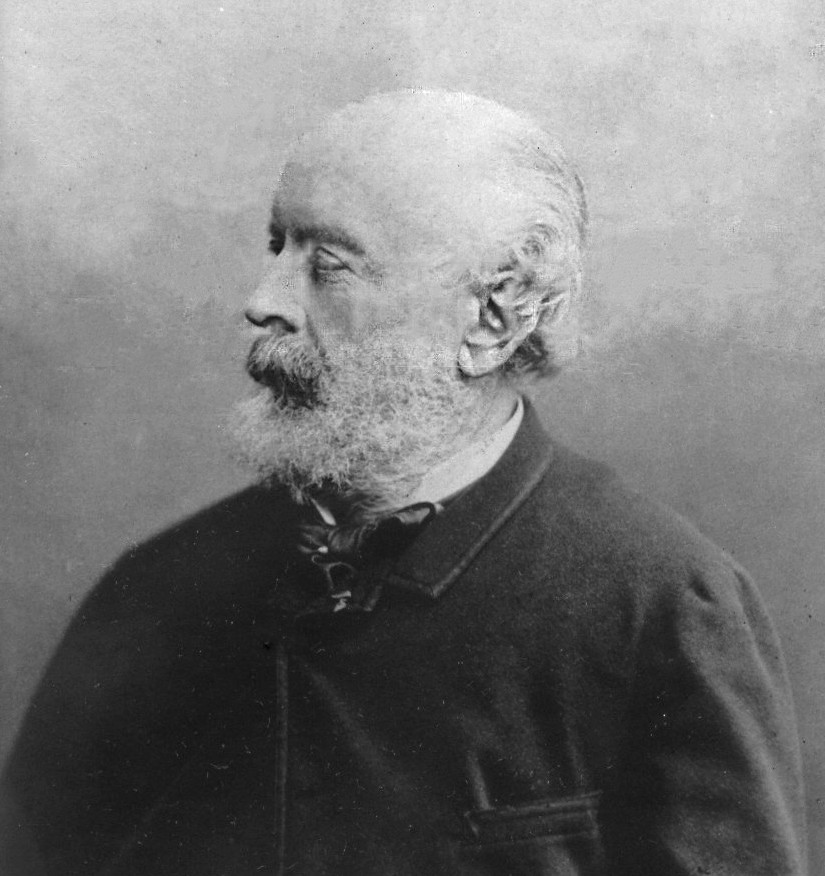
Luminais (date unknown)

Évariste Vital Luminais (French pronunciation: [evaʁistə vital lyminɛ]; 13 October 1821 – 10 or 15 May 1896) was a French painter. He is best known for works depicting early French history and is sometimes called "the painter of the Gauls".

== Life and career ==
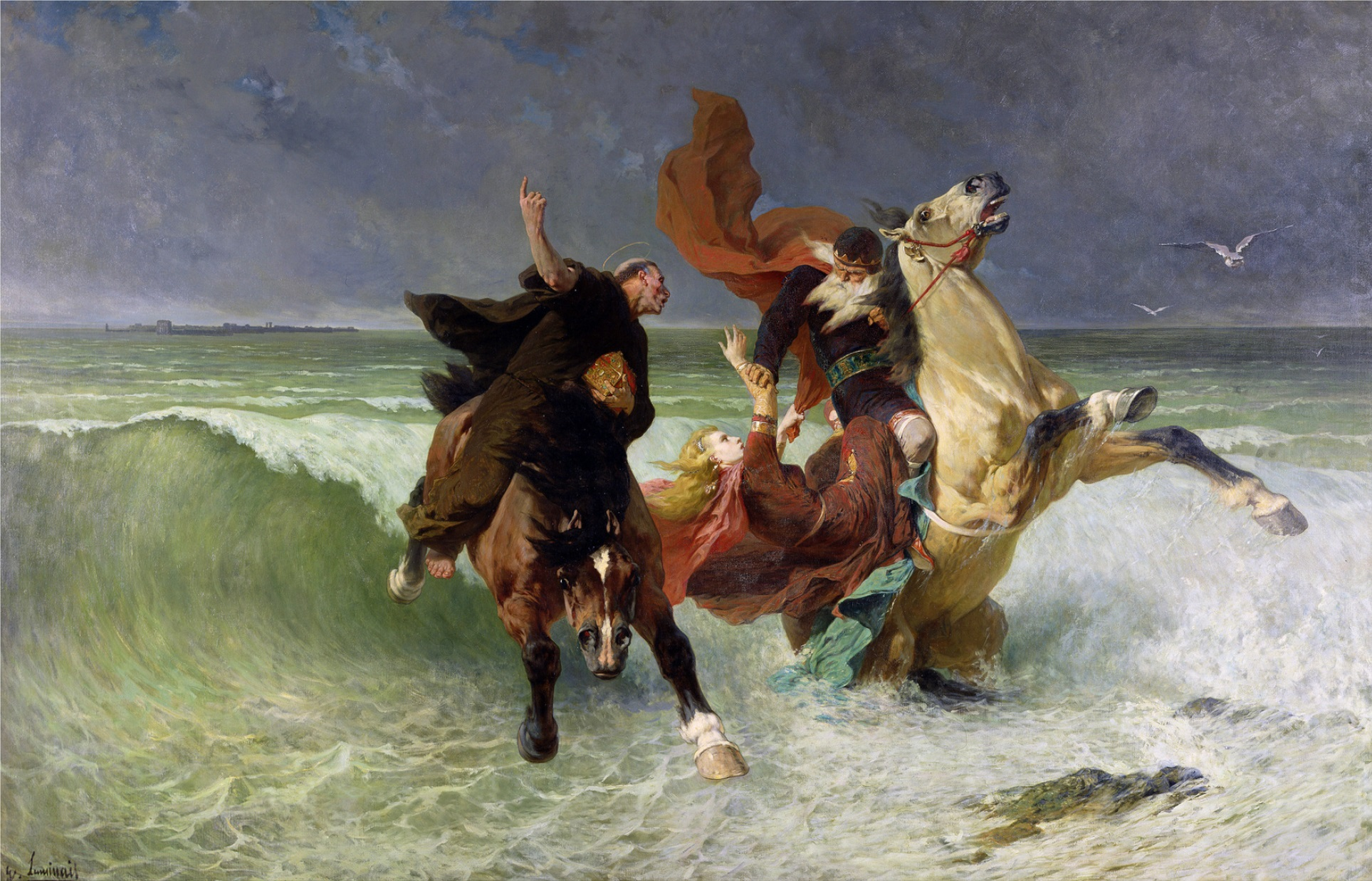
Flight of King Gradlon (c. 1884)

Luminais was born in Nantes into a parliamentary and legal family. His great-grandfather Michel Luminais was an official in the Vendée; his grandfather Michel-Pierre Luminais represented the Vendée in parliament from 1799 to 1803; and his father, René Marie Luminais, represented Loire-Inférieure from 1831 to 1834 and Indre-et-Loire from 1848 to 1849. Aware of his natural artistic talent, his family sent him to Paris when he was 18 to study with the painter and sculptor Auguste Debay. He also studied with Léon Cogniet, a historical and portrait painter whose pupils included Léon Bonnat, and Constant Troyon, who painted landscapes and animals.

He married twice. By his first wife, Anne Foiret, he had a daughter, Esther. After Anne's death in 1874, he remarried in 1876 to one of his pupils, Hélène de Sahuguet d'Amarzit d'Espagnac; she had been married to Claude Durand de Neuville but had been widowed in the War of 1870.

He made his official début at the Paris Salon of 1843, where two of his paintings were hung. He won medals at the Salons of 1852, 1855, 1857, 1861 and 1889. In 1869, he was awarded the Légion d'honneur. He won the gold medal at the 1889 Exposition, and was a founder member of the Société des Artistes Français. For more than forty years, he divided his time between his Paris studio at 17 boulevard Lannes and his summer house and studio in the village of Douadic, in the Brenne region. The area had been recommended to him by two friends, Jules de Vorys and Louis Fombelle. Among his students were Albert Maignan and Emily Sartain; he was one of the few Academy painters who would teach women.

Luminais died in Paris at the age of 75 and was buried in the little cemetery in Douadic. His native city of Nantes has a street named for him.

== Works ==
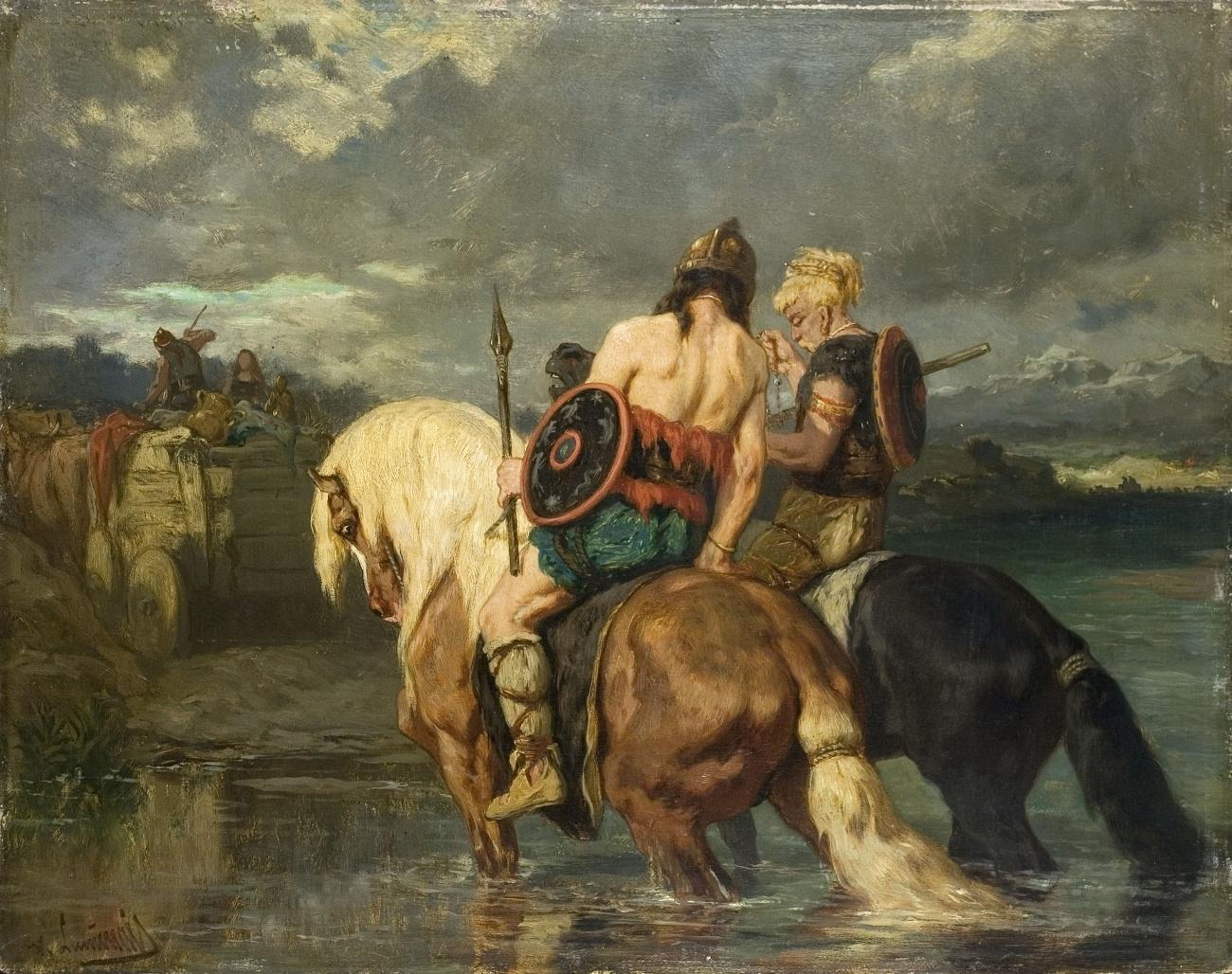
Goths crossing a river

Luminais worked in the genre and historical modes. He was among the academic painters who satisfied a social demand for aggrandising, even propagandistic historical works in the early years of the Third Republic, after the defeat in the Franco-Prussian War. As such, he shared in their condemnation by the advocates of modern art. However, in some paintings, such as The Widow (1865) he foreshadows social realism. He also used a historical dressing to make hunting and peasant scenes more palatable to the Academy.

=== Gauls and other ancient peoples ===
Luminais played an important part in disseminating the iconography of the Gauls; their popular image, with long hair and winged helmets, was developed by historians at this time as part of an examination of French history. Sometimes called 'the painter of the Gauls', he also depicted other scenes of early medieval history, often clashes between different peoples, such as campaign-hardened Romans in breastplates reinforced with metal battling daring Celts who are bare-chested, with only helmet and shield for protection.

More unusually among historical artists of the time, he also depicted the Franks, whose contribution to French history was then generally underrated in favour of the Gauls. His painting of the Alemannic rout at the hands of the Franks in the Battle of Tolbiac impressed Théophile Gautier at the 1848 Salon. His Frankish Cavalry in Combat was inspired by reading Chateaubriand. His paintings on Merovingian topics emphasise the barbaric cruelty of the rulers. Pepin the Short's overthrow of Childeric III with the agreement of Pope Zachary and the deposed king's imprisonment in the Monastery of St. Bertin at Saint-Omer is the subject of his painting The Last of the Merovingians, for which he reportedly used one Jean Marie Dagobert as his model. At the 1883 Salon, the critic Charles Bigot hoped this would indeed be Luminais "last" Merovingian painting.

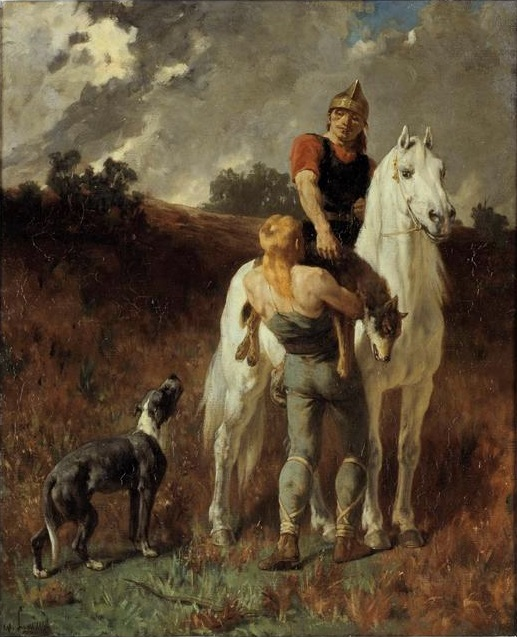
Gaul Returning from the Hunt (1906)

As was common among historical painters at the time, his paintings contain anachronisms and out of place details. For example, in the 1906 painting of a Gaul returning from the hunt, the clothing is anachronistic and the helmet more a characterisation of the mounted man as a Gaul than a hunting accessory. The long red hair is part of the 19th-century image of the Gaul. His In Sight of Rome shows the same liberty: the shield on the left and the helmets are not realistic. The Celtic incursion into Italy made an early and lasting impression on artists. In depicting the Merovingian Franks, 19th-century painters unaware of archaeological evidence costumed queens in Oriental Germanic fashion, as in Luminais' Merovingian Princess. Luminais' approach focussed more on distancing the image from the present than on evoking a specific era.

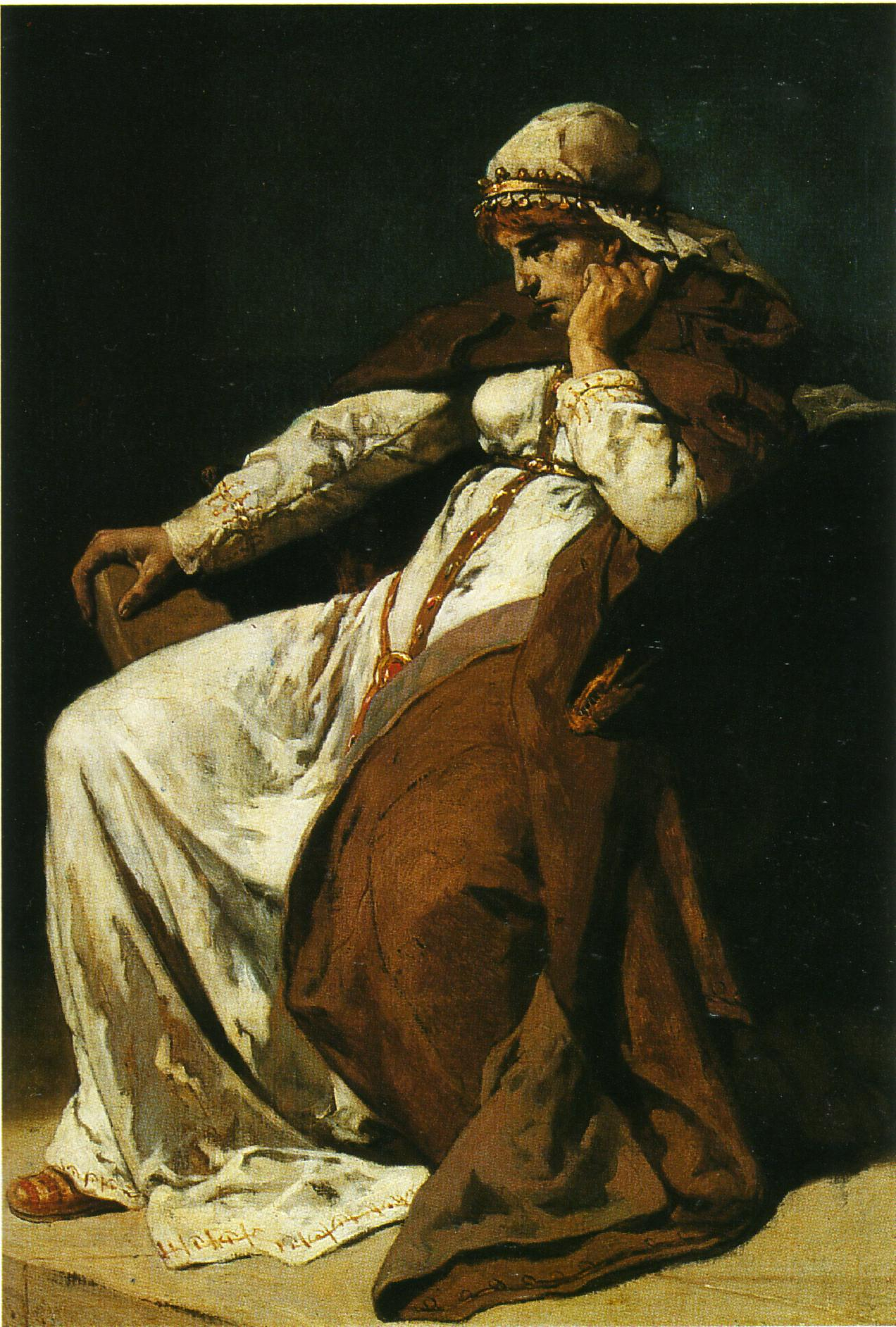
Merovingian Princess

Having met Théodore Hersart de La Villemarqué, who had published a collection of popular Breton songs, Barzaz Breiz, around 1884 he based on one of the songs his Flight of King Gradlon, depicting the king fleeing on horseback from his city of Ys as it is swallowed by the sea; St. Winwaloe urges him to jettison his only child, Dahut. The art museums in Quimper, Rennes and Nantes hold several sketches for the work. Exhibited at the Salon of 1884, the painting was hailed as a "superb dramatic group, full of life".

=== The Sons of Clovis II ===
In 1880 he painted what, according to Bonnie Effros, was his most famous Merovingian painting, The Sons of Clovis II, also called Les Énervés de Jumièges (the enervated men of Jumièges), based on a legend concerning the 7th-century Merovingian king Clovis II: after rebelling against their father, the two princes are said to have been punished according to their own mother's suggestion by the removal of their vital force ("enervation") through the destruction of the tendons of their muscles; they were then set adrift on a raft in the River Seine, at the mercy of God, but according to the legend they were rescued by the monks of the Abbey of Jumièges and later reconciled with their parents. The version exhibited at the 1880 Salon created a sensation and is judged to be his best work. The painting evokes varying and strong reactions; Simone de Beauvoir wrote in 1960 of "calm horror".

The work went through a number of stages of refinement. The first study, Première pensée pour les Énervés de Jumièges, shows the cutting of the tendons and depicts four figures; a second study depicts the raft floating down the river, but has three figures, prefiguring the men's salvation by the monks. The two finished paintings show only the two figures alone on the raft. The version shown at the Salon was sold to Australia under the title The Sons of Clovis II and after being exhibited in various locations including Wallis & Sons' gallery of French paintings in London (1881), the Munich International Exposition (1883), the National Gallery of South Australia and the National Gallery of Victoria (1896), is now in the Art Gallery of New South Wales in Sydney. The second version, with greater emphasis on the grandeur of nature, was kept by Luminais; after his death it was acquired by the State and in 1912 was deposited in the Musée des Beaux-Arts in Rouen.

=== Brenne paintings ===
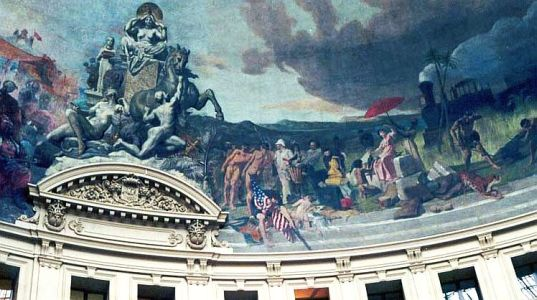
North America section of the fresco for the Paris Commercial Bourse.

At his summer studio in Douadic, he painted works reflecting his love of nature and of hunting, such as:

- The Hallali, memories of hunting in Brenne in 1863
- The Two Guardians
- La Folle du Tertre (the madwoman of the mound), based on a local legend
- Hunting Through the Ages, six-panel work for the dining room of his friend Louis Fombelle
- Illustrations for Jules de Vorys' book on Dagobert I, Dagobert en Brenne

=== Monumental painting ===
Luminais was one of five artists who collaborated between 1886 and 1889 on a monumental fresco, more than 1,500 square metres (16,000 sq ft) in area, for the interior of the dome of the Paris Commercial Bourse, representing the history of intercontinental trade. It includes a scene representing America which features Indians, slaves, labourers, cowboys, and a steam train representing the modern world.

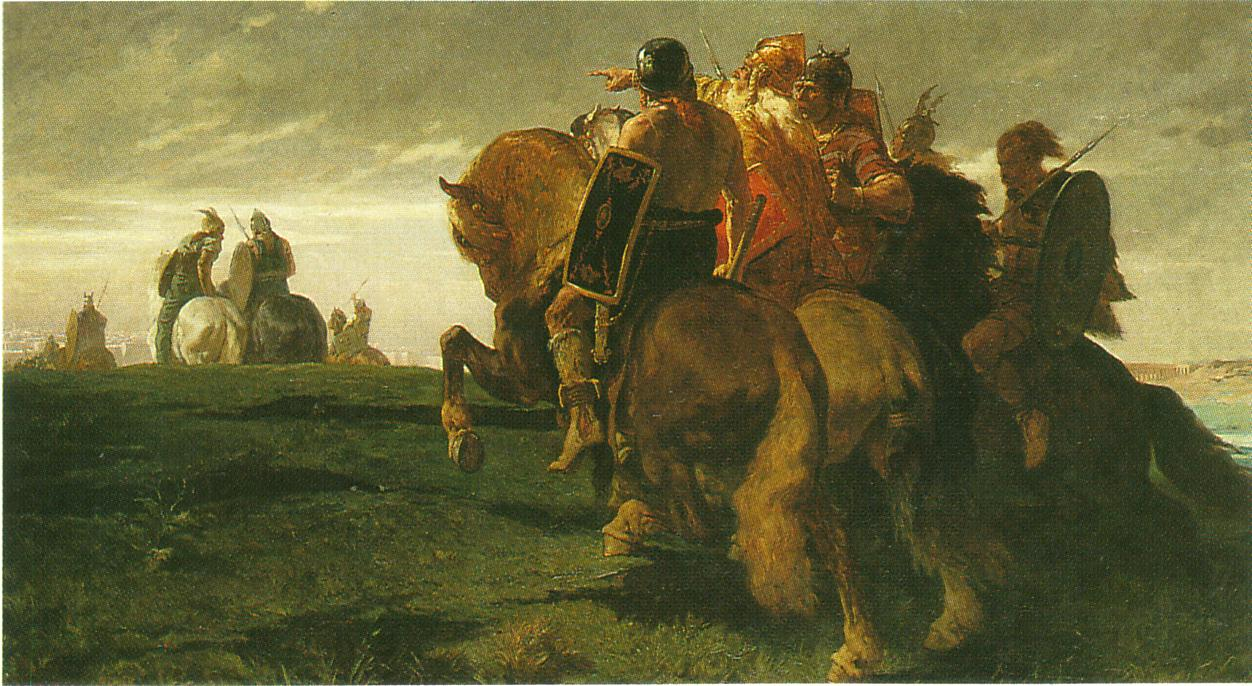
In Sight of Rome

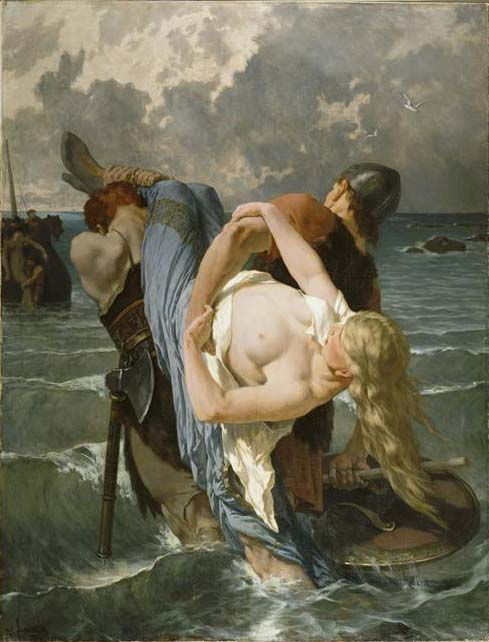
Norman pirates in the 9th century

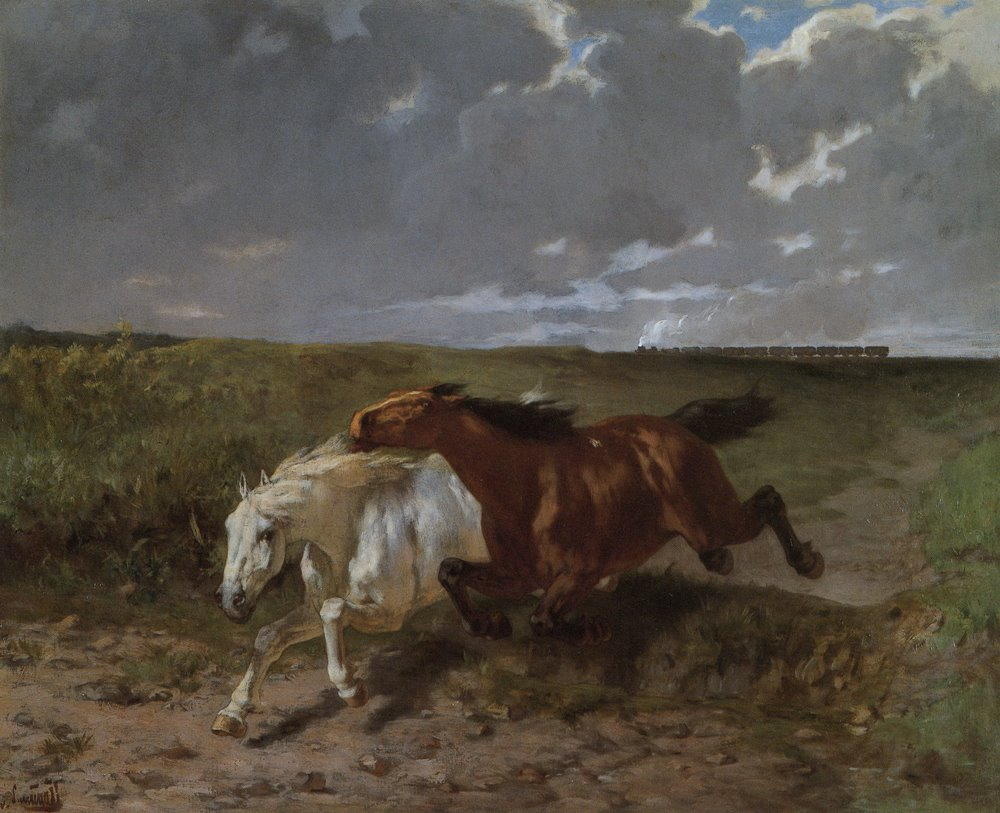
Rivals

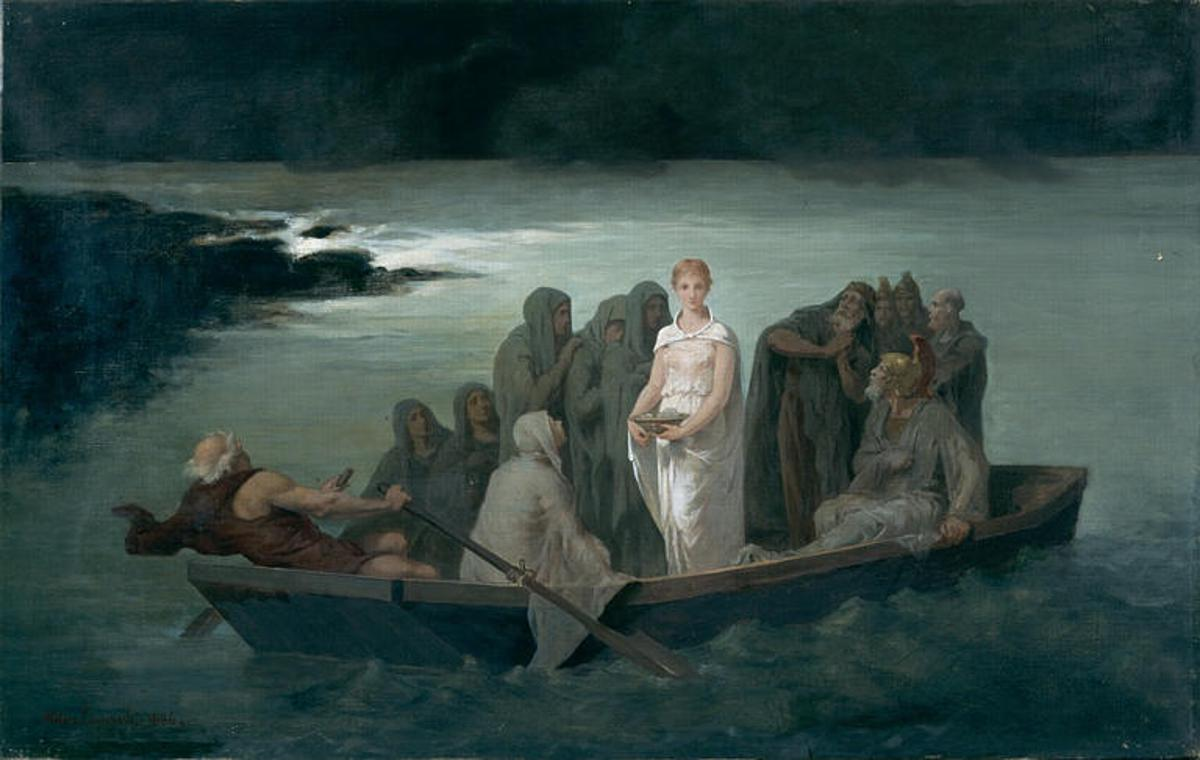
Psyché

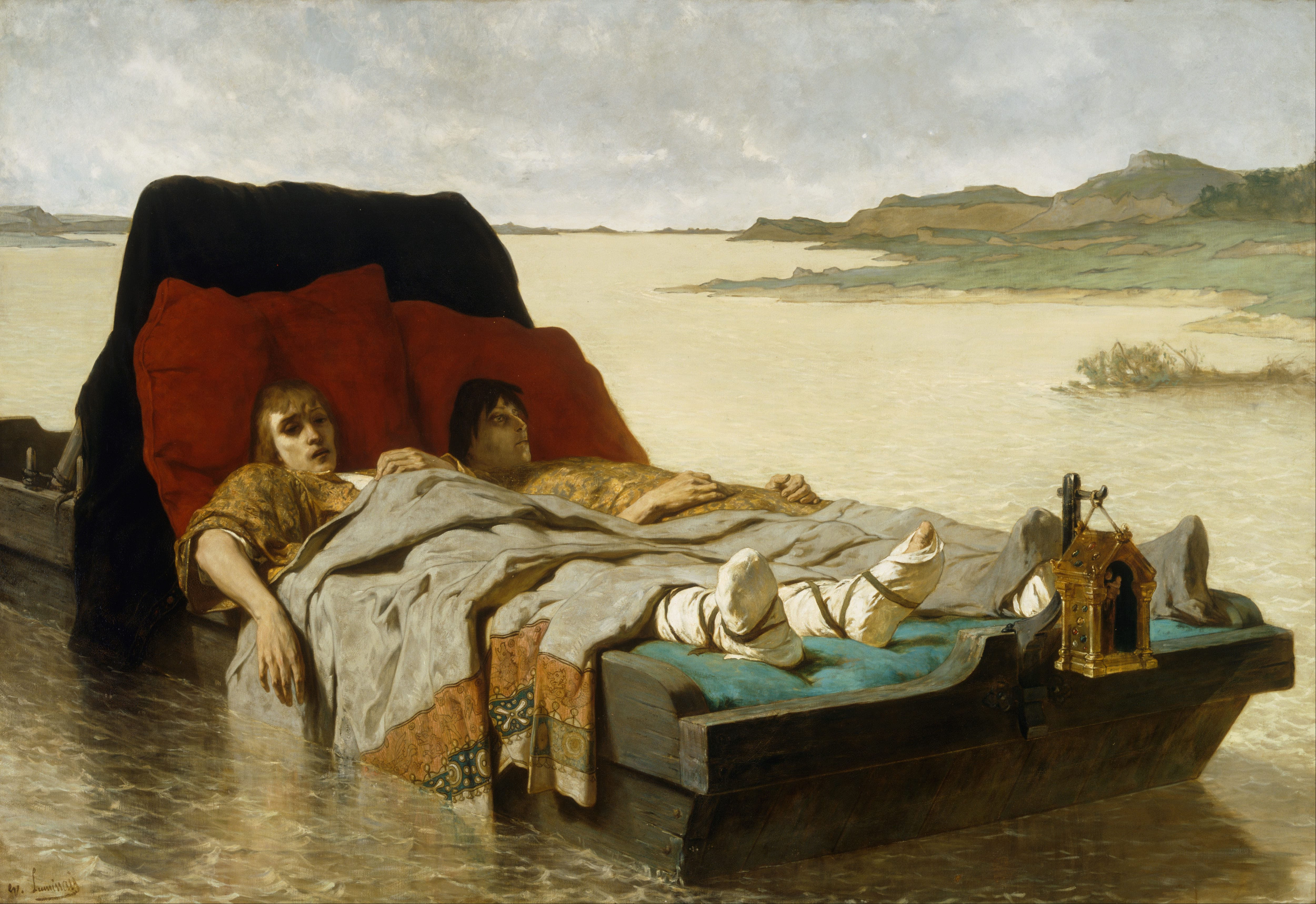
The Sons of Clovis II (Sydney version)

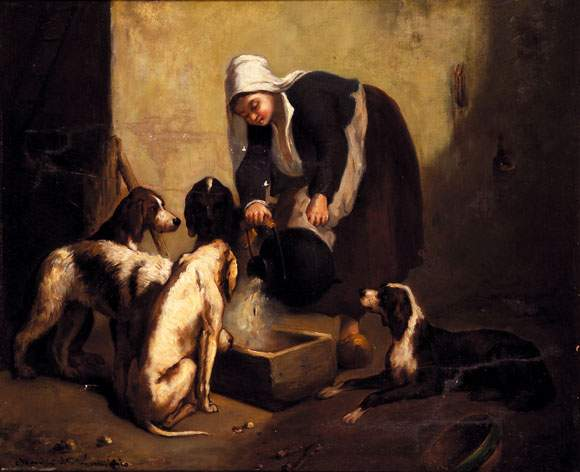
Feeding the hunting dogs

== Further information ==
- Media related to Évariste-Vital Luminais at Wikimedia Commons
- Françoise Daum, Dominique Dussol et al. Evariste Vital Luminais, Peintre des Gaules, 1821–1896. Exhibition catalogue. Carcassonne: Musée des beaux-arts; Charleville-Mézières: Musée de l'Ardenne, 2002. OCLC 225448715. (in French)
- Gilles Brenta and Claude François (script and direction). Le Défilé des toiles. VHS documentary. 52 mins. Brussels: Les Trois petits cochons, 1997. OCLC 490326144. (in French)
- Claude Duty. Les Énervés de Jumièges. Short film, in Claude Duty réalisateur: six films courts. VHS compilation. 72 mins. France: Production A.A.A. / Stellaire Production, 1986–1995. OCLC 415521441. (in French)
