= Gradlon =

King of Cornouaille (5th century)

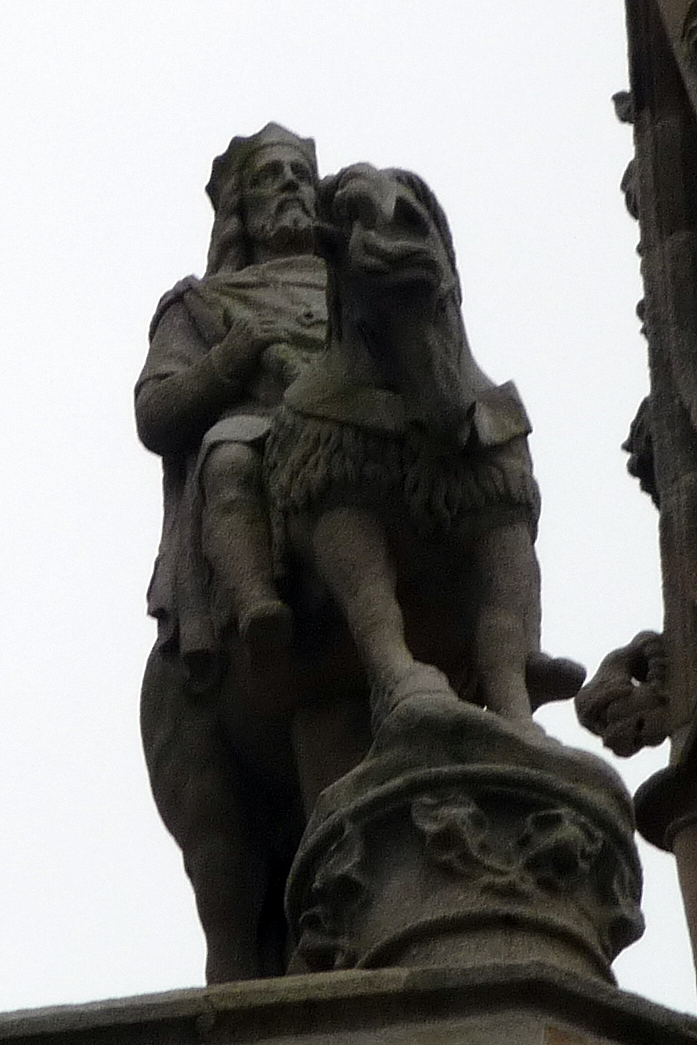
Statue of King Gradlon at Quimper Cathedral, by sculptors Amédée Ménard and Alphonse Le Brun (1858)

Gradlon the Great (Gradlon Meur) was a semi-legendary 5th century "king" of Cornouaille who became the hero of many Breton folk stories. The most famous of these legends is the story of the sunken city of Ys. He is supposed to have been the son of Conan Meriadoc, but Conan lived much earlier in the late 4th Century.

== Legend of Ys ==
King Gradlon (Gralon in Breton) ruled in Ys, a city built on land reclaimed from the sea, sometimes described as rich in commerce and the arts. He lived in a wealth palace of marble, cedar and gold. In some versions, Gradlon built the city upon the request of his daughter Dahut, who loved the sea. To protect Ys from inundation, a dike was built with a gate that was opened for ships during low tide. The one key that opened the gate was held by the king.

Some versions, especially early ones, blame Gradlon's sins for the destruction of the city. However, most tellings present Gradlon as a pious man, and his daughter Dahut as a sorceress or a wayward woman who steals the keys from Gradlon and opens the gates of the dikes, causing a flood which destroys the whole city. A Saint (either St. Gwénnolé or St. Corentin) wakes the sleeping Gradlon and urges him to flee. The king mounts his horse and takes his daughter with him, but the rising water is about to overtake them. Dahut either falls from the horse, or Gradlon obeys a command from St. Gwénnolé and throws Dahut off. As soon as Dahut falls into the sea, Gradlon safely escapes. He takes refuge in Quimper and reestablishes his rule there.

== Malgven ==
Some versions add the story of Gradlon's wife, a Viking princess and sorceress named Malgven. This character's first known appearance was in 1892 in the writings of Édouard Schuré, where she dies suddenly after Gradlon becomes king of Cornouaille, leaving him to raise their daughter Dahut.

Malgven was popularized in Charles Guyot's La Légende de la ville d'Ys d'après les anciens textes. In Guyot's version, Gradlon invades Norway and there meets Queen Malgven, who helps him enter the city and kill her decrepit, avaricious husband. She and Gradlon flee on the magical horse Morvarc'h, which can run on the water. However, Malgven dies giving birth to Dahut, who closely resembles her. The grieving Gradlon lavishes his attention on his daughter. It is debated how much of this story is traditional, with some readers believing it is totally literary and others seeing possible parallels in folklore.

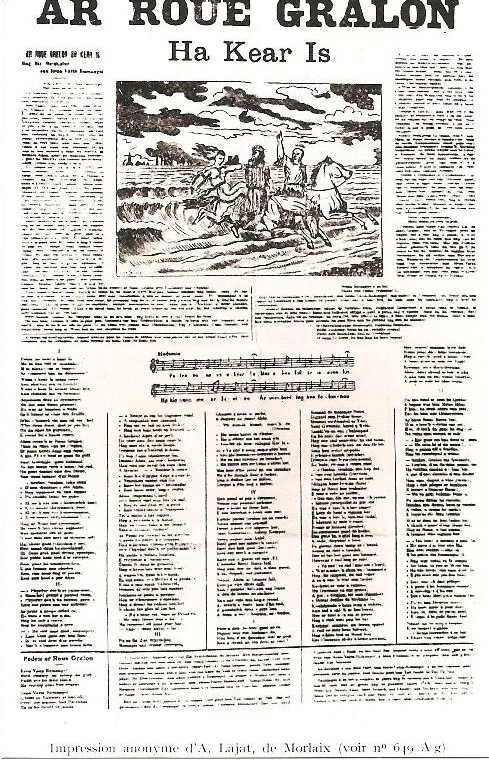
Lyrics and sheet music for the Breton gwerz "Ar Roue Gralon ha Kear Is" ("King Gradlon and the City of Ys", 1850)

== Graelent ==
Some scholars have connected Gradlon to the Breton lai of Graelent, as far back as Kerdanet's edition of Albert Le Grand's Vies des Saints. The knight Graelent, reduced to poverty after angering the queen, meets a beautiful woman at a fountain and takes her as his mistress. She restores his wealth. However, he breaks his promise to her and tells others of her existence. When she leaves, he pursues her and nearly drowns trying to follow her across a river. She relents and takes him with her to her world, leaving his horse waiting on the bank. The couple is never seen again.

== Historicity ==
Gradlon Mor or, in Latin, Gradlonus Magnus, appears in the Life of St. Winwaloe written before 884. Here he is depicted as the founder of Cornubia (Cornwall) who died at the beginning of the 6th century. Elsewhere, a cartulary of Landévennec describes Charlemagne sending ambassadors to appeal for Gradlon Mur's help.

Gradlon Mor, the son of Conan Meriadoc, was succeeded by his son Salomon I and then by his grandson Auldran. According to Amy Varin, the Landevennec Cartulary credits Gradlon with one son named Riwallon who died young.

Gradlon may have been a common Breton name; the cartulary of Landévennec also mentions two other Cornish counts named Gradlon Flam and Gradlon Plueneuor.

== See also ==
Media related to Gradlon Mawr at Wikimedia Commons

- Argol Parish close
- Culture of France
- History of France
- Religion in France
- Roman Catholicism in France
