= Lí Ban (mermaid) =

Figure from Irish mythology

Lí Ban or Liban (from Old Irish lí 'beauty' and ban 'of women', hence 'paragon of women'), in the legend surrounding the formation of Lough Neagh, was a woman turned mermaid who inhabited the area before the great lake gushed up on dry land. Her family was drowned, but she survived in an underwater chamber in the lake for a year, after which she was transformed into a being who was half-human, half-salmon.

In her mermaid form, she was spotted by the ship carrying a messenger sent by St. Comgall to Rome. She promised to meet at the seaport inlet of Inbhear nOllarbha (Larne Lough) in Ireland after one year, and was captured in a fishnet. There she was baptised by Comgall, and given the Christened name Muirgein ("sea-born") or Muirgeilt ("sea-wander"). (Note: Imhoff 2008, p. 114 note 37: "Muirgeilt..in Aided Echach.. implied [as being] interchangeable with Murgein", and Muirgeilt appears in the saints' list in the Martyrology of Drummond.) She appears as Saint Muirgen in genealogies of Irish saints with her feast day assigned to 27 January.

The mermaid figure may ultimately derive from another Lí Ban, Sister of Fand, in Irish mythology.

== Legend ==
Liban, a mermaid (muirgelt) who was the daughter of Eochaid, was captured in the year 558 A.D. according to the Annals of the Four Masters, compiled the 17th century. Her capture (Note: She is not referred to by name in the Annals of Ulster, but only as "the mermaid" (in Muirgheilt); O'Donovan identifies this as an account of the same event.) is also given brief notice under the year 571 in the Annals of Ulster.

The Annals of the Four Masters adds that Liban was captured on the strand of "Ollarbha" (River Larne, or Inver River in Larne), in the net of a fisherman for St. Comgall of Bangor. An account of Liban's life story is found in the tale Aided Echach maic Maireda (Death of Eochaid son of Mairid), preserved in the 12th century Lebor na hUidre ("Book of the Dun Cow"). The tale has been translated by P. W. Joyce and by Standish Hayes O'Grady (1892).

According to this old tale, Liban turned into a mermaid when a spring burst under her house to form Lough Neagh (Old Irish: Loch nEchach), named after Liban's father Eochaid mac Mairidh (Note: son of king Mairid of Munster (Imhoff 2008, p. 108)) who was drowned by the gushing water. But Liban survived in an underwater chamber in the lake for one year, after which she turned into mermaid form, half human and half salmon. Together with her lapdog which assumed the form of an otter, the mermaid was free to roam the seas for 300 years, while maintaining her dwelling under the same Lough. During the time of St. Comgall, her angelic singing causes her to be discovered by a passing boat (coracle), and she agreed to come ashore. The mermaid was then baptised Muirgen ("sea-born"), but died immediately and ascended to heaven. She had forfeited another 300 years of longevity for a Christian soul.

Liban's capturer, named Béoán son of Innli, (Note: "Beonan, son of Inli" in the Annals) was not just a "fisherman" according to the tale, but a member of the monastery of Tech Dabeoc (House of St. Dabeoc in County Donegal), and was on a mission to Rome sent by St. Comgall when he encountered Liban. Liban agrees to be buried in his monastery, but later on, a dispute arises over the right to her burial between him and St. Comgall, and the owner of the net. This was settled by divine judgment, as two oxen hitched to her chariot carried Liban to the monastery of Dabeoc.

== Notes ==
Explanatory notes

== See also ==
- Morgan le Fay
- Morgen

== Bibliography ==
- Imhoff, Helen (2008), "The Themes and Structure of Aided Echach Maic Maireda", Ériu, 58: 107–131, JSTOR 20696364
- O'Donovan, John, ed. (1856), Annals of the Kingdom of Ireland, vol. I (2nd ed.), Hodges, Smith, and Co., pp. 200–202
- O'Conor, C., ed. (1826), Annales Ultonienses, vol. Tome IV, Buckingham: J. Seeley, p. 26
- O'Grady, Standish Hayes, ed. (1892), "Death of Eochaid", Silva Gadelica (I. – XXXI.): Translations and notes, Williamsa na Norgate, pp. 265–9
- Joyce, Patrick Weston, ed. (1879), "The Overflowing of Lough Neagh and the Story of Liban the Mermaid", Old Celtic Romances, London: Kegan Paul, pp. 97–105
- Vries, Ranke de (2007), "The Names of Lí Ban", in Nagy, Joseph Falaky (ed.), Myth in Celtic Literatures, CSANA Yearbook 6, Dublin: Four Courts, pp. 39–54, ISBN 978-1-84682-046-5
