= Géo-Charles =

French poet

Olympic medal record

Art competitions
Gold medal – first place	1924 Paris	Literature

Géo-Charles real name Charles Louis Proper Guyot (French: [ʃaʁl ɡɥijo]; March 22, 1892 – July 7, 1963) was a French poet. In 1924 he won a gold medal in the art competitions of the Olympic Games for his "Jeux Olympiques" ("The Olympic Games").

== Biography ==
A sports enthusiast, his works often deal with this subject. He was a winner of the literary contest at the 1924 Olympic Games in Paris. He was friends with many athletes, as well as with French writers of his time (Jean Cocteau, Blaise Cendrars). A great art lover and friend of Tsuguharu Foujita, Léopold Survage, Vicente do Rego Monteiro (his guide on a journey through Brazil to discover sacred Baroque art), and Frans Masereel, he was a discerning collector (he acquired Max Beckmann’s Le Pont at auction, Metzinger, Manolo), he immersed himself in the artistic buzz of Montparnasse and co-founded the magazine of the same name with Paul Husson. Close to the avant-garde movements in art and literature, he was also a radio host and commentator. In 1982, his wife Lucienne donated 143 works to the city of Échirolles to establish a museum dedicated to sports. Born on July 6, 1915, she died on January 21, 2015, at the age of 99.

== See also ==
- Musée Géo-Charles
