= Édouard Schuré =

French philosopher, poet, playwright, novelist, music critic, and publicist

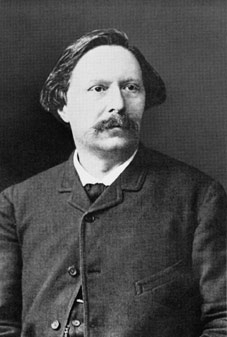
Édouard Schuré

Eduard (Édouard) Schuré (January 21, 1841 in Strasbourg – April 7, 1929 in Paris) was a French philosopher, poet, playwright, novelist, music critic, and publicist of esoteric literature.

== Biography ==
Schuré was the son of a doctor in the Alsatian town of Strasbourg, who died when Édouard was fourteen years old. Schuré mastered French as well as German, and was influenced by German and French culture in his formative years. He received his degree in law at the University of Strasbourg, but he never entered into practice. Schuré called the three most significant of his friendships those with Richard Wagner, Marguerita Albana Mignaty and Rudolf Steiner.

Schuré's interest and studies led to an extensive knowledge of German literature. The discovery of Wagner's "music drama" Tristan and Isolde impressed him sufficiently to seek—and obtain—Wagner's personal acquaintance.

In France, he published his first work Histoire du Lied—a history of the German folk song, which earned him some recognition in the country of his family. With the publication of the essay Richard Wagner et le Drame Musical, he established himself as a major French Wagner expert and advocate of the time.

When the Franco-German war of 1870-71 poisoned the German arts for many French, it would seem that Schuré was not immune from this influence. His nationalism is reflected in his remarks of this time—and later in his life—in a comparison of glorified Celtism (France) and a negatively viewed "Teutonism" (Germany).

On a trip to Italy during this time he met, twenty years his senior, a Greek woman, Marguerita Albana Mignaty, whom he subsequently described as his "muse", although he himself was married.

After the tide of war had ebbed, Schuré reestablished his relationship with Wagner. In 1873, he met the German philosopher Friedrich Nietzsche; with frequent contact they shared enthusiasm for Wagner. The cultist veneration of Wagner, however, seeded Schuré's alienation from the composer.

Schuré now turned increasingly to the esoteric and the occult, his major influence being the famous French occultist-scholar Fabre d'Olivet. In 1884, he met the founder of the Theosophical Society Helena Petrovna Blavatsky. Although unwelcome in the Theosophical Society, he nevertheless entered. In 1889, he published, after some smaller works on similar topics, his major work Les Grands Initiés (The Great Initiates).

In 1900, the actress Marie von Sivers came into contact with him because she intended to translate his works into German (The Great Initiates, The Sacred Drama of Eleusis and The Children of Lucifer). At the German Section of the Theosophical Society, he met the Austrian philosopher and later founder of Anthroposophy, Rudolf Steiner. In 1906, Sivers brought about a meeting between Schuré and Steiner. Schuré was deeply impressed and thought of Steiner as an authentic 'initiate' in line with his The Great Initiates. After hearing Steiner lecture in Paris for the first time in 1906, Schuré in an ecstatic state ran home and wrote down the entirety of the lecture from memory. This first lecture, and the other lectures in the series (which Schuré wrote down) were published as Esoteric Cosmology. Subsequently, Steiner and von Sivers staged Schuré's esoteric dramas at the following Theosophical Congresses in Berlin and Munich. Schuré's The Children of Lucifer, served as a precursor of Rudolf Steiner's own esoteric dramas.

In 1908 Schuré brought out Le Mystère Chrétien et les Mystères Antiques, a French translation of Steiner's work Christianity as Mystical Fact and the Mysteries of Antiquity. With the outbreak of World War I, Schuré's relationship with Steiner and his wife became strained. Schuré threw in the two secret intentions about Germanic and Pan and stepped out of Steiner's Anthroposophical Society. Four years after the war, Schuré re-consolidated his friendship with Steiner.

In subsequent years, Schuré published his autobiography.

== Esoteric and literary meaning ==
Schuré's The Great Initiates is described by some as a masterpiece. In it, he describes the path allegedly followed by some of the ancient philosophers in search of profound esoteric knowledge, often called the "initiation", as describing the process of becoming a mystic master or spiritual healer.

Those familiar with Rama, Hermes Trismegistus, Socrates, Jesus, Orpheus will find frequent references in Schuré's work. Although having no knowledge of the 'druid' Rama, Schuré pursued the notion that a secret esoteric knowledge was known to them all, that this group were among the pillars of civilization and represented the founders of spiritual and philosophical ways of being as well as in some cases—though contrary to their message—religions. Schuré recognized that the path to a harmonious world was not to be found through a bigoted denial of the value found by other civilizations by their own sages. He wanted people to recognize the value of democracy in spiritual, philosophical, and religious ways.

Schuré wrote a considerable number of books and plays. In his 1912 From Sphinx to Christ (Treatise on Occult History), he admires the hereditary caste system in India. He believed the Brahmans had to protect their pure caste from admixtures with the blood of the lower castes of India.

His plays enjoyed relative fame in his days in Europe, and some of them were put on stage by Steiner. He also influenced Russian composer Sergei Prokofiev.

== Works (selection) ==
=== Works available in English ===
- The Great Initiates, A Study of the Secret History of Religions
- The Children of Lucifer (Drama in 5 Acts)
- The Genesis of Tragedy and The Sacred Drama of Eleusis (Treatise on Theatre, including a reconstruction of an ancient drama)
- From Sphinx to Christ (Treatise on Occult History)
- Hermes to Plato
- Krishna and Orpheus
- Jesus the Last Great Initiate
- The Priestess of Isis (Novel)
- Woman the Inspirer (Lecture/Treatise)
- Ricardo Wagner - His Work and Ideas
- History of Music Drama
- A Beam of Sunlight in the Deep Forest (A collection of mystical prose works, including the novel 'The Angel and the Sphinx')

=== Original editions ===
- Histoire du Lied ou la chanson populaire en Allemagne, 1868
- Le drame musical. Richard Wagner, son œuvre et son idée, 2 volumes, 1875
- Les Grands Initiés. Esquisse de l'histoire secrète des religions, 1889
- Le drame sacré d'Eleusis, 1890
- Sanctuaires d'Orient, Paris 1898
- Les grandes légendes de France, Paris, 1893
- Les Enfants de Lucifer, 1900
- Précurseurs et revolt, Paris, 1904
- La Prêtresse d'Isis (Légende de Pompeii), 1907
- Femmes inspiratrices et poètes annonciateurs, Paris, 1908
- L'évolution divine. Du Sphinx au Christ, 1912
- Les prophètes de la renaissance, 1920
- Celtique L'âme et le génie de la France à travers les Ages, Paris 1920
- Merlin l'enchanteur, Paris, 1921
- Le rêve d'une vie. Confession d'un poète (autobiography), 1928
