= Malo-Renault =

French pastelist, color engraver and illustrator

- Émile Auguste RENAULT
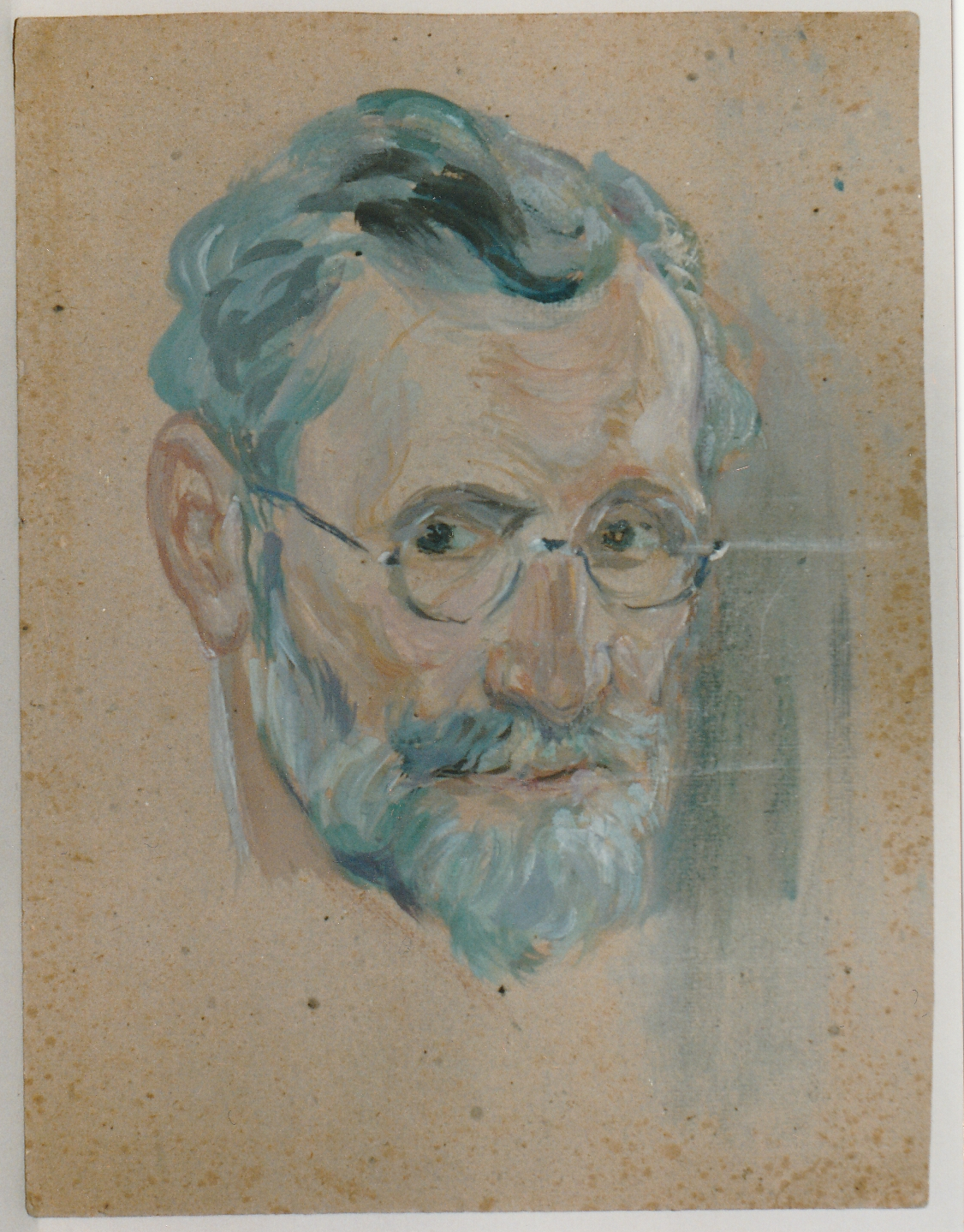
- Born: Émile Auguste Renault; October 5, 1870; Saint-Malo, France
- Died: July 19, 1938 (aged 67); Le Havre, France
- Burial place: Rocabey Cemetery, Saint-Malo
- Other name: Émile Malo-Renault
- Occupations: artist pastel, color engraver, illustrator
- Style: Art nouveau Figurative art
- Spouse: Nori Malo-Renault
- Children: Jean Malo-Renault
- Website: malo-renault.fr

Émile Auguste Renault, better known by his pseudonym Malo-Renault, was a French pastelist, color engraver and illustrator. He was born in Saint-Malo on October 5, 1870, and died in Le Havre on July 19, 1938.

== Biography ==
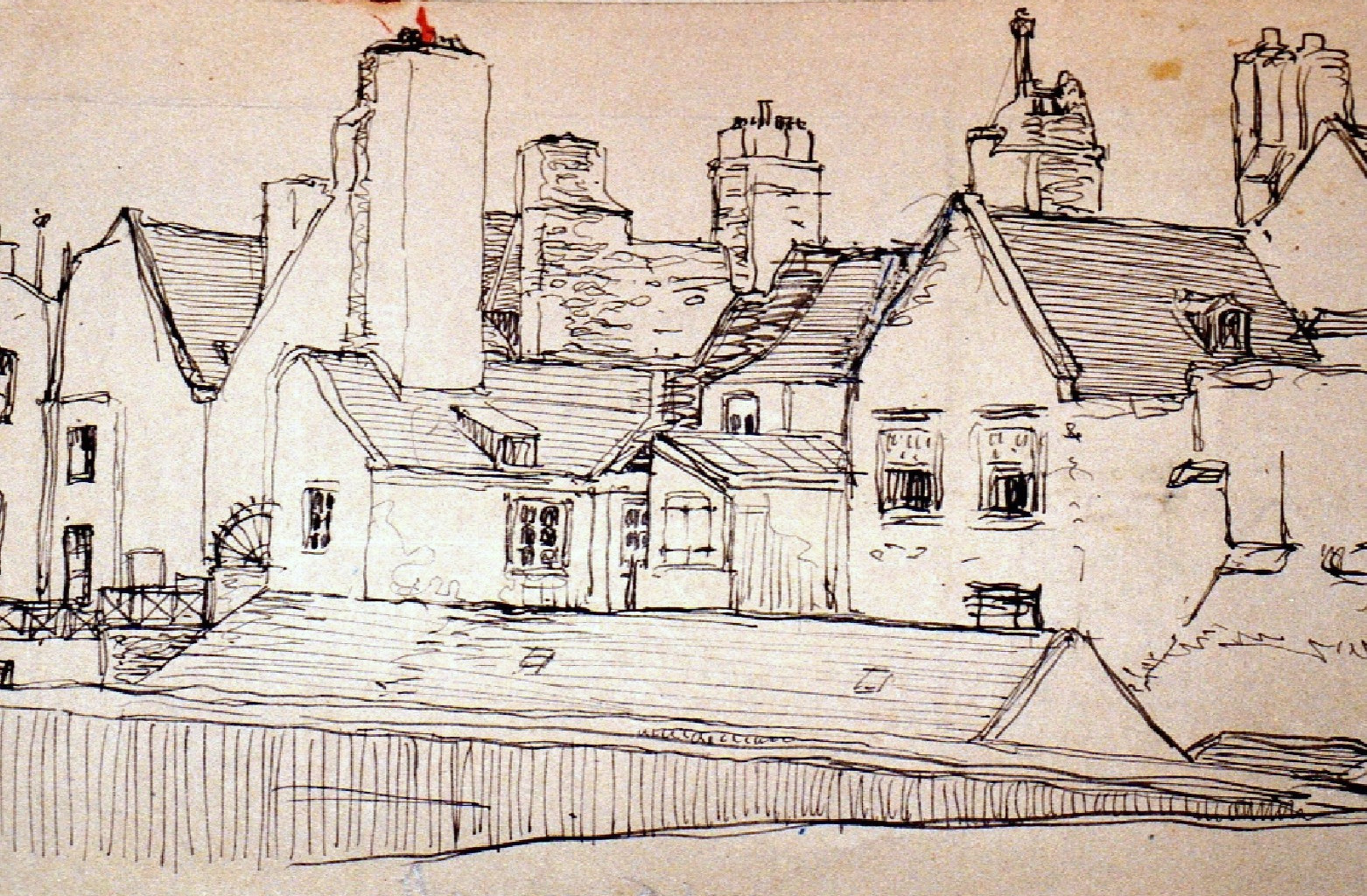
Saint-Malo, demeure d’Émile Auguste Renault

Renault began drawing frequently in childhood. Auguste Lemoine (1848–1909), a drawing teacher at the college of Saint-Malo from 1883 to 1903, inspired him to draw from nature and in colour. Under the direction of Auguste Lemoine, Malo-Renault experimented with etchings. After completing his Bachelor of Arts, Malo-Renault went on to study architecture in Paris as a Stéphane Pannemaker student at the École nationale supérieure des arts décoratifs.

It was only after his marriage in 1897 with Honorine Tian (1871–1953), known as Nori Malo-Renault, a student of etcher Géry-Bichard, that Malo-Renault began his engraving career with the support of his wife for the development of color prints, in particular in Le serpent noir by Paul Adam.

Between 1903 and 1928 he participated in many exhibitions at the Salon of the Société Nationale des Beaux-Arts, where he was a member from 1910. he is a representative of the art nouveau style with a Japanese influence.

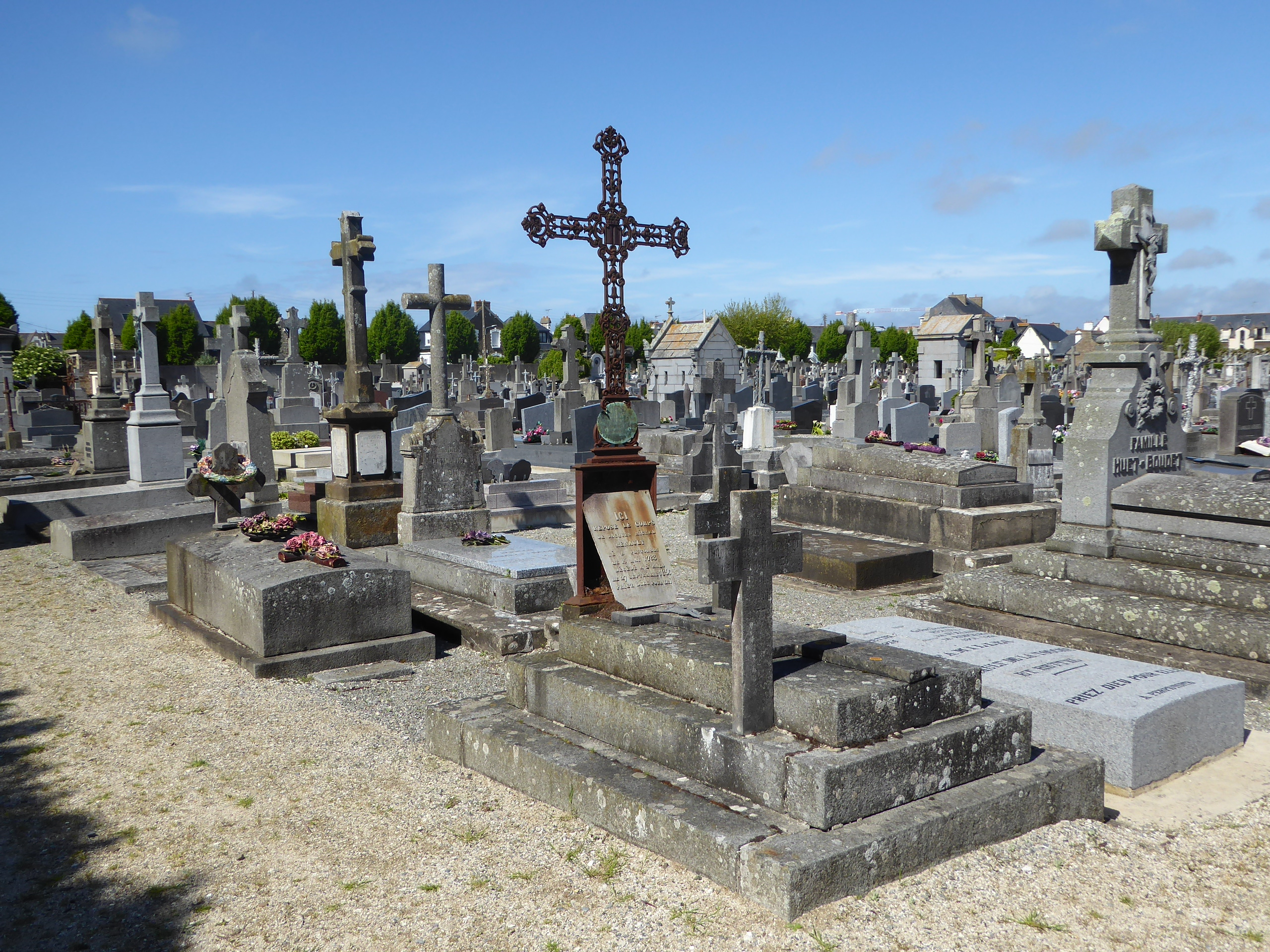
Rocabey Cemetery, the grave of Malo-Renault

He died accidentally in Le Havre, run over by a motorcycle, on July 19, 1938 and buried in Saint-Malo Rocabey Cemeter.

== Works ==
Malo-Renault found inspiration in his native land, Saint-Malo and Brittany: landscapes and Bretons are the first subjects of his pastels and his color prints.

He specialized in color engraving, first in etching, in soft varnish, then in drypoint.For his color prints, he uses several matrices (generally 2 to 4), one color per color. the identification of the engraved plates is necessary for the correct superposition on the paper. On the print of the Little Pussy, the traces of the two small holes for identification are clearly visible

Between 1904 and 1906, Malo-Renault produced a series of 15 sketches of Parisian women, subsequently creating 15 engravings based on them between November 1905 and November 1906. Roger Marx wrote the preface for this album, titled *Quelques-Unes*, in February 1908; the preface was printed by Frazier-Soye in May 1908.

Quelques Unes: Series of 15 sketches of Parisian women (1904–1909)

Series of prints:The Months of the Year, or Fashion Figures (Paris 1912–1913)

In 1912, he took up wood engraving on the advice of Stéphane Pannemaker, but it was mainly afterwards that he adopted the process of wood with a penknife for the illustration of La Rapsode foraine and Le Pardon de Sainte-Anne (1920) based on this poem by Tristan Corbière.

Le Pardon de Sainte-Anne (1920), matrices engraved on wood, Library of Rennes Métropole.

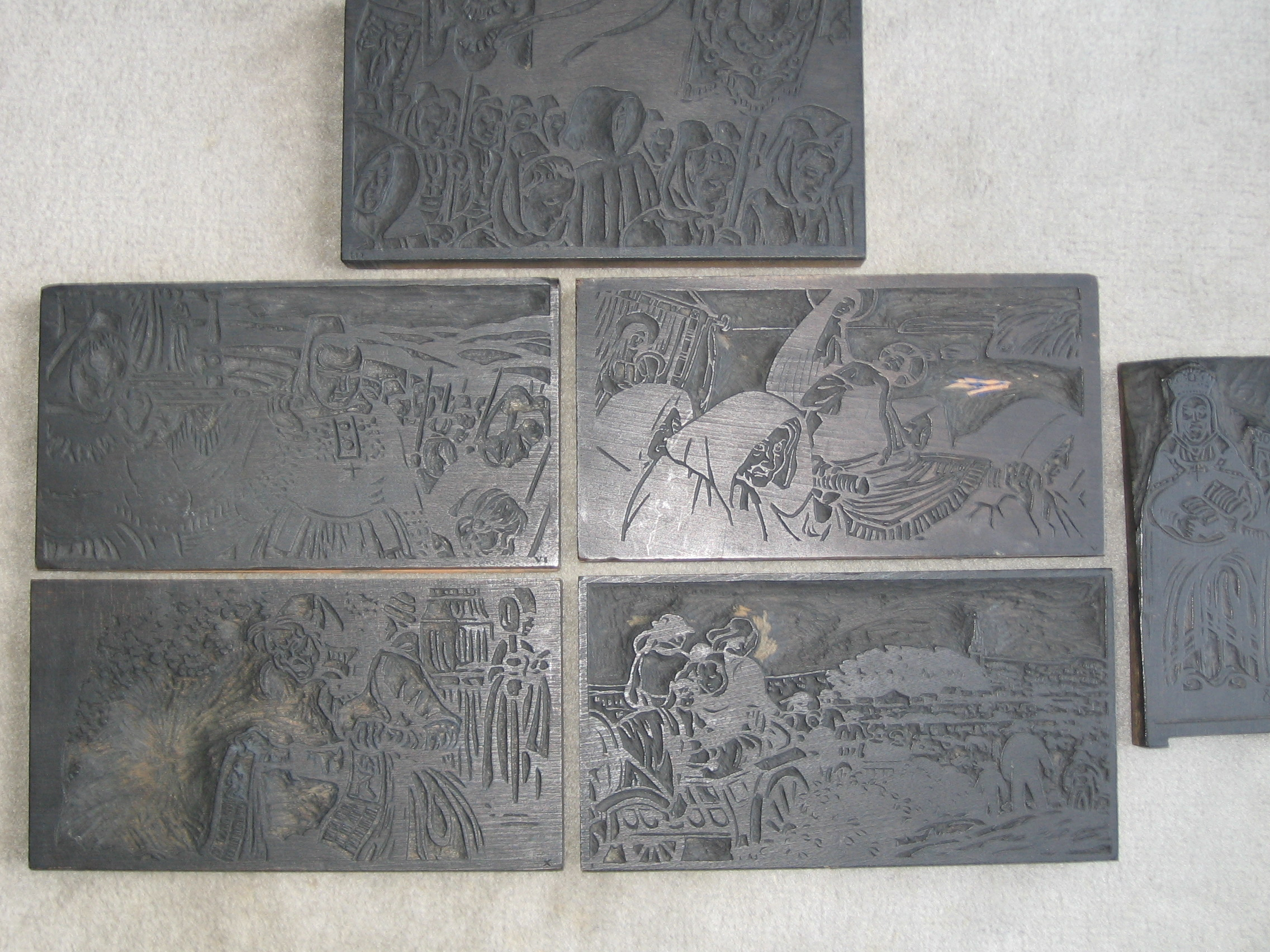
Woodcut of La Rapsode foraine et Le Pardon de Sainte-Anne

Le pardon de Sainte Anne de Tristan Corbière

  .

On the occasion of the release in 1922 of Jardin de Bérénice by Maurice Barrès, he engraved on wood the print of the menu for the Cent bibliophiles, using four plates for the four colors.

== Gallery ==
=== Pastels ===
   Pastels of Malo-Renault (early 20th century)

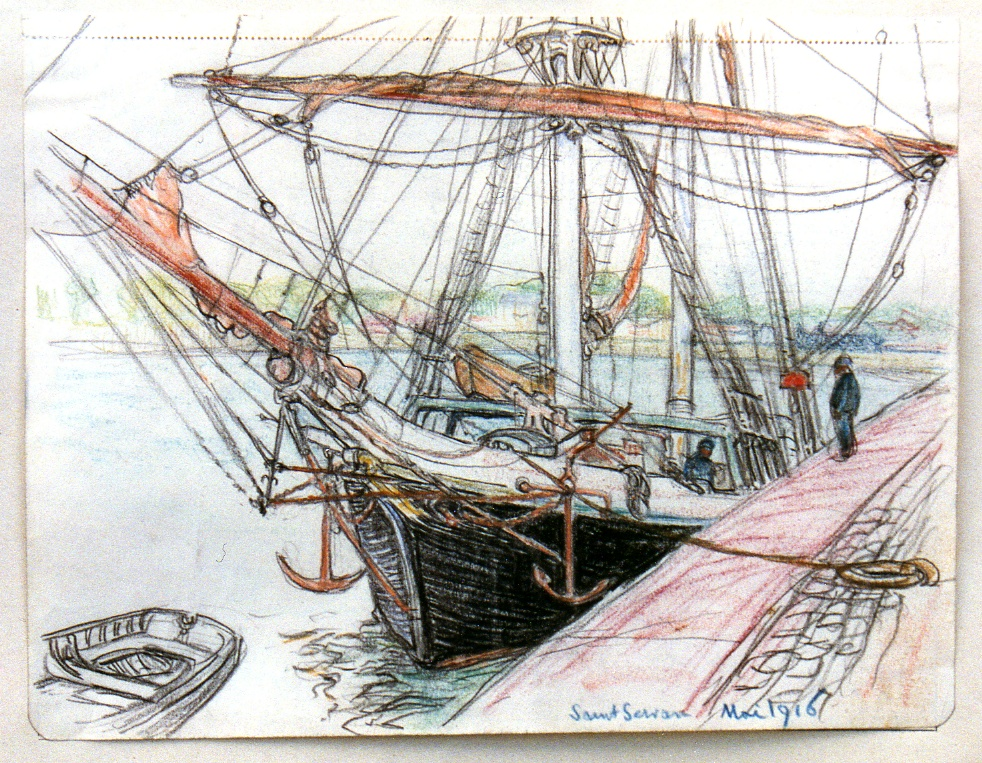
Terre-neuvas at quay in Saint-Servan,(1915) ,Saint-Malo, Museum of the History of the City and the Malouin Country.

Belgian fishing boats that took refuge in Saint-Servan (1916)

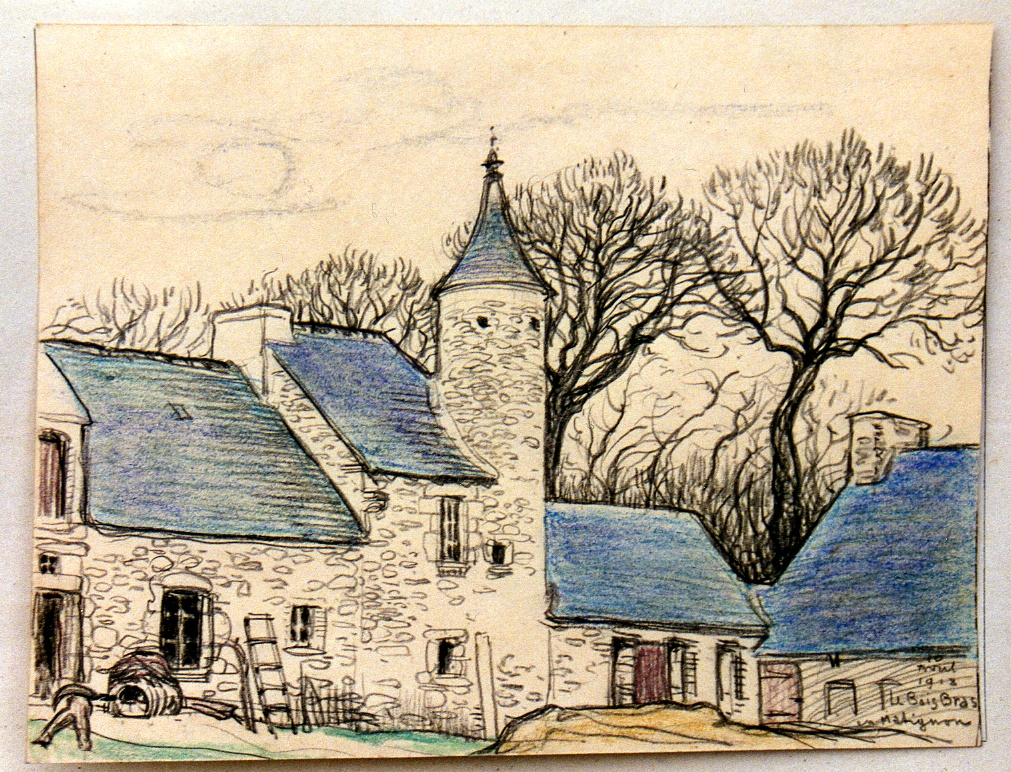
Le Bois Bras en Matignon (1918) . collection musée de Bretagne

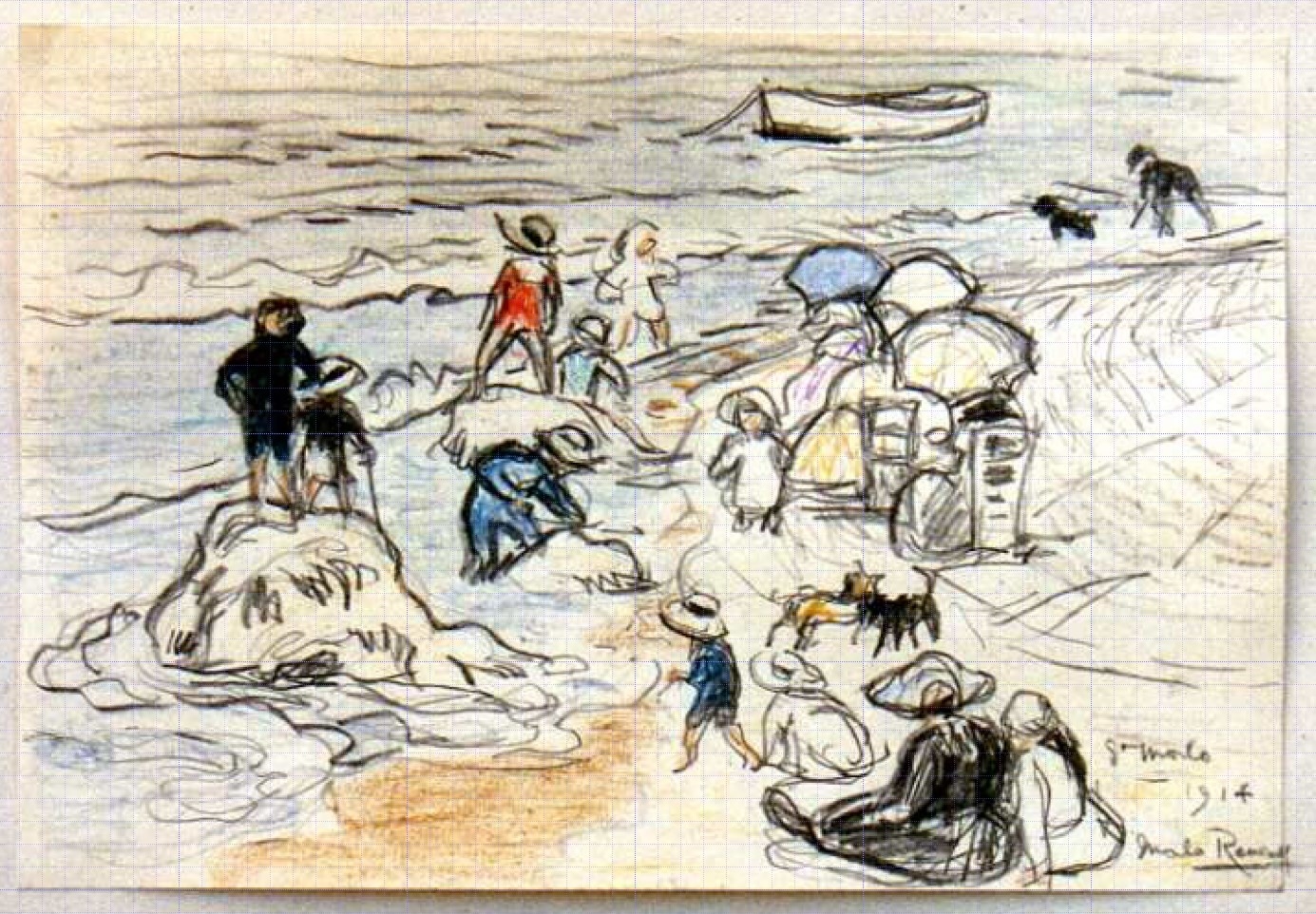
Saint-Malo, Plage de l'éventail, children play at the water's edge,

L'oreiller aux poupées, pastel preparatory to the print of the same name (1907)

=== Color print ===
Color etching & color drypoint of Malo-Renault

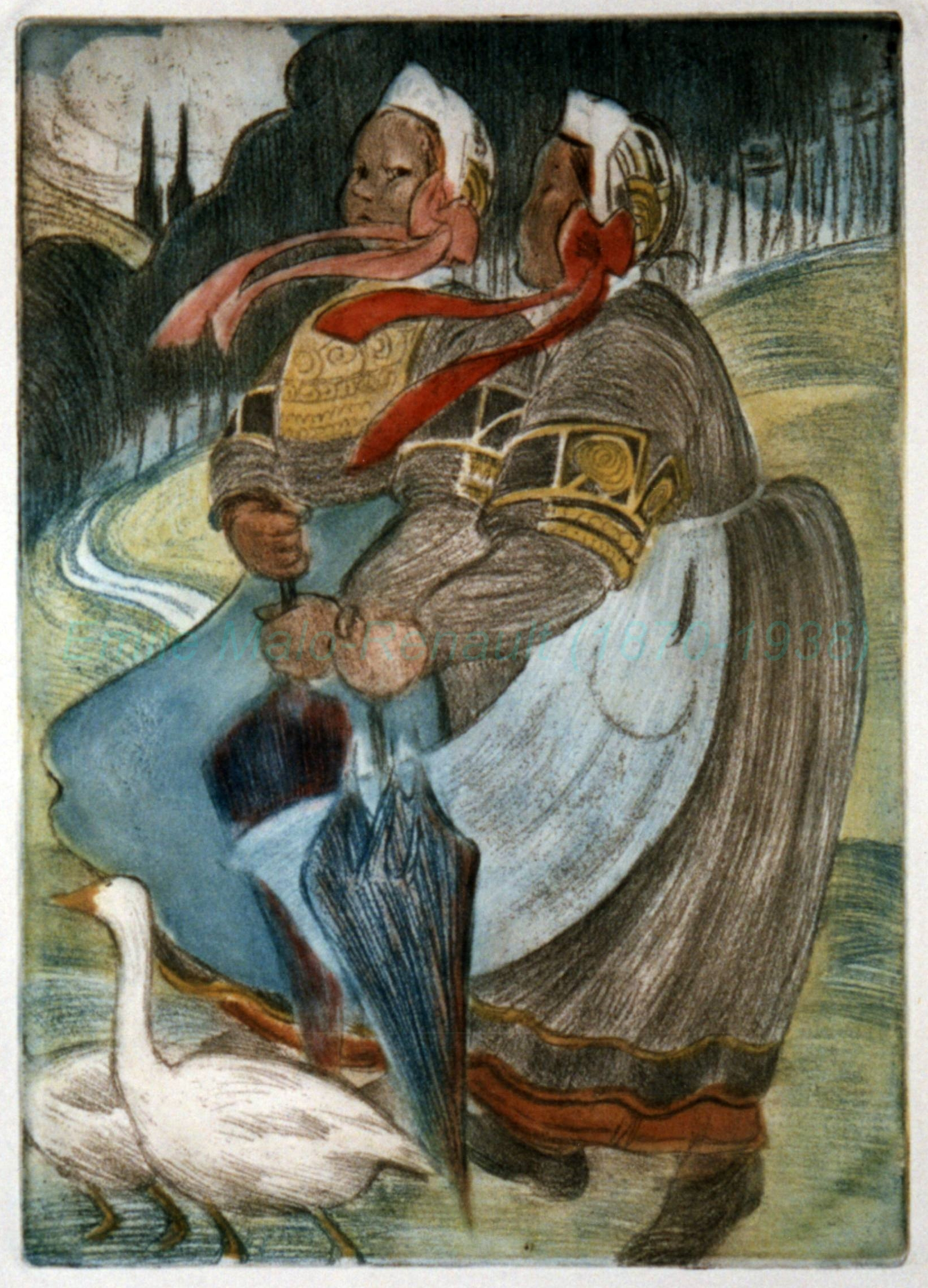
Le coup de vent, etching (1902)

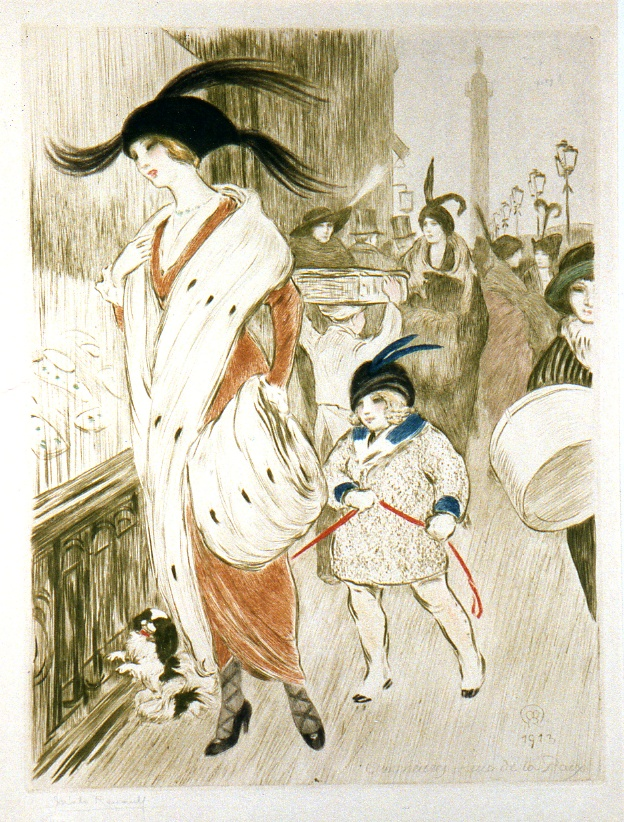
Cinq heures rue de la Paix, drypoint (1912)

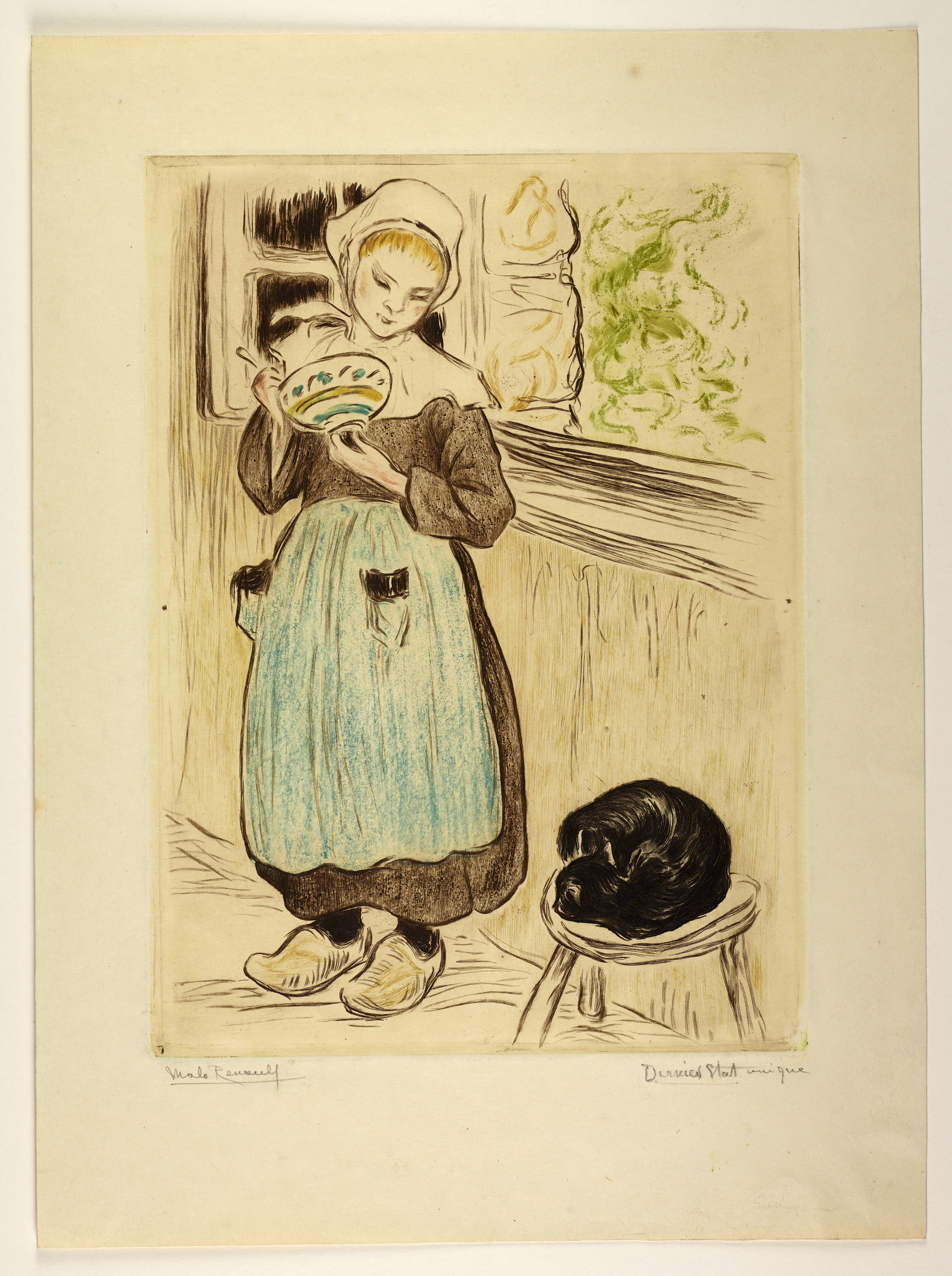
La petite Chatte, drypoint, etching, and aquatint. Brittany Museum

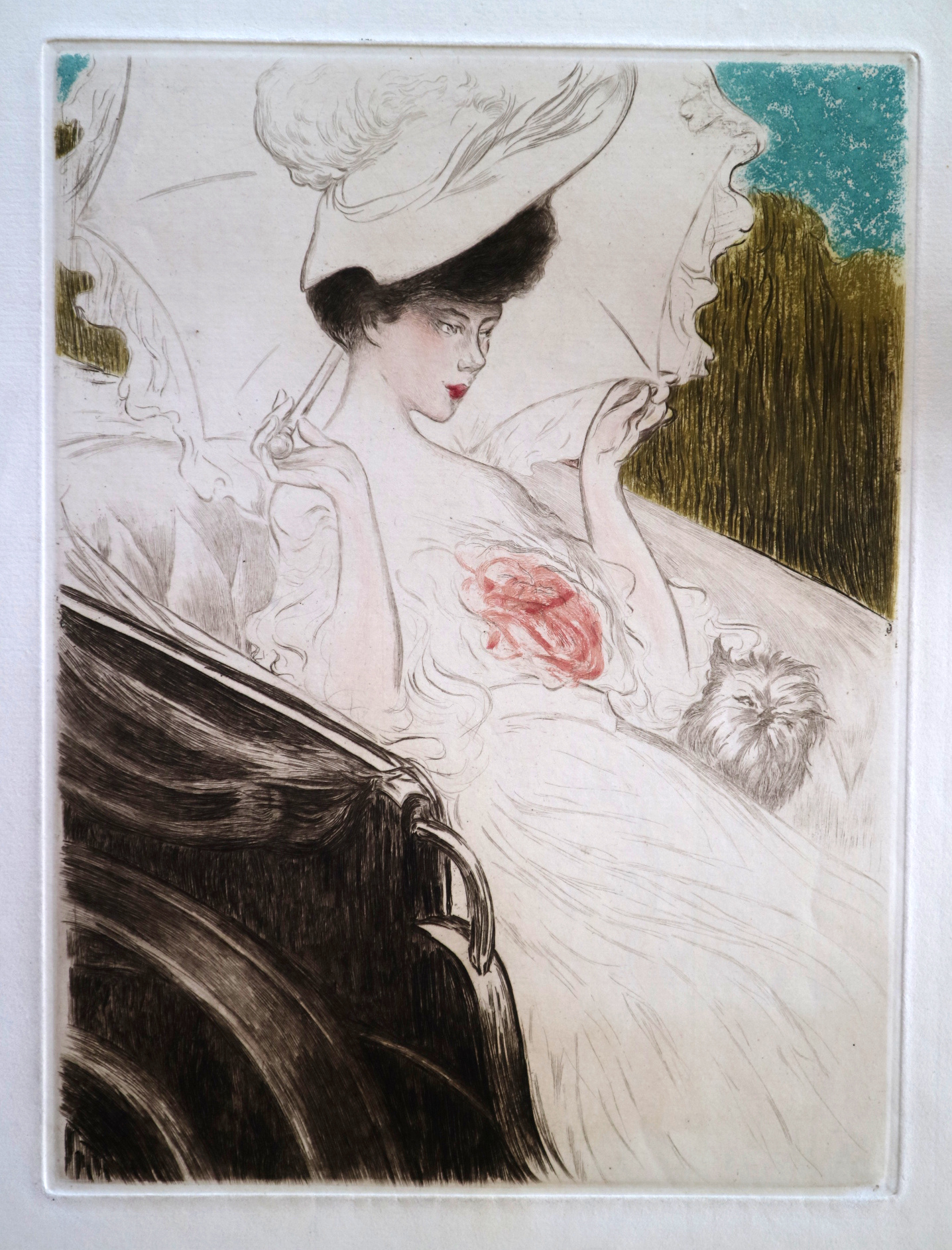
En Victoria, color etching (1908)

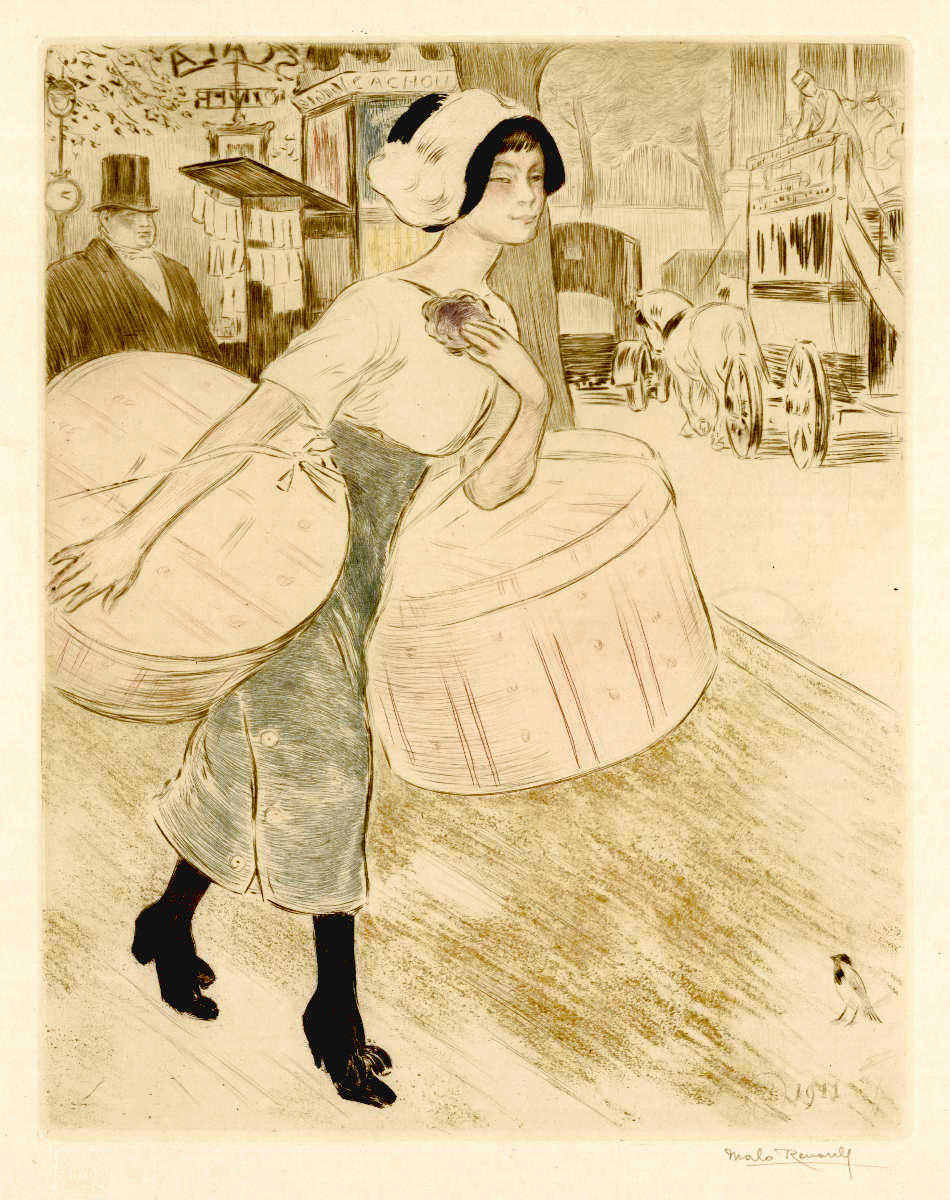
MuséeLeTrotitn; etching and drypoint (1911), musée de Genève MAH

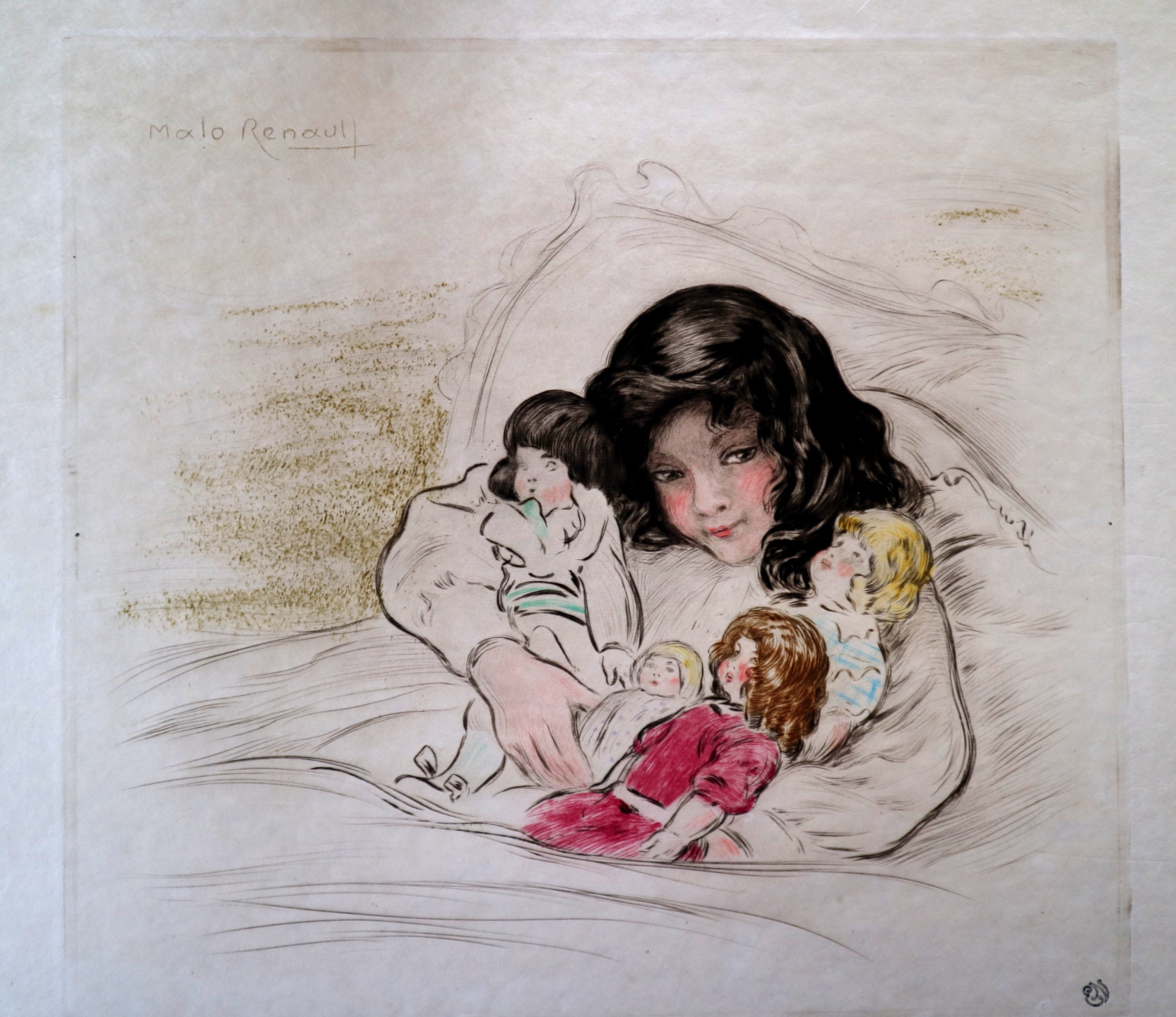
L'oreiller aux poupées (1913) British Museum

=== Illustrated books(1904-1928) ===
Drypoint prints, etchings, litho drawing by Malo-Renault:

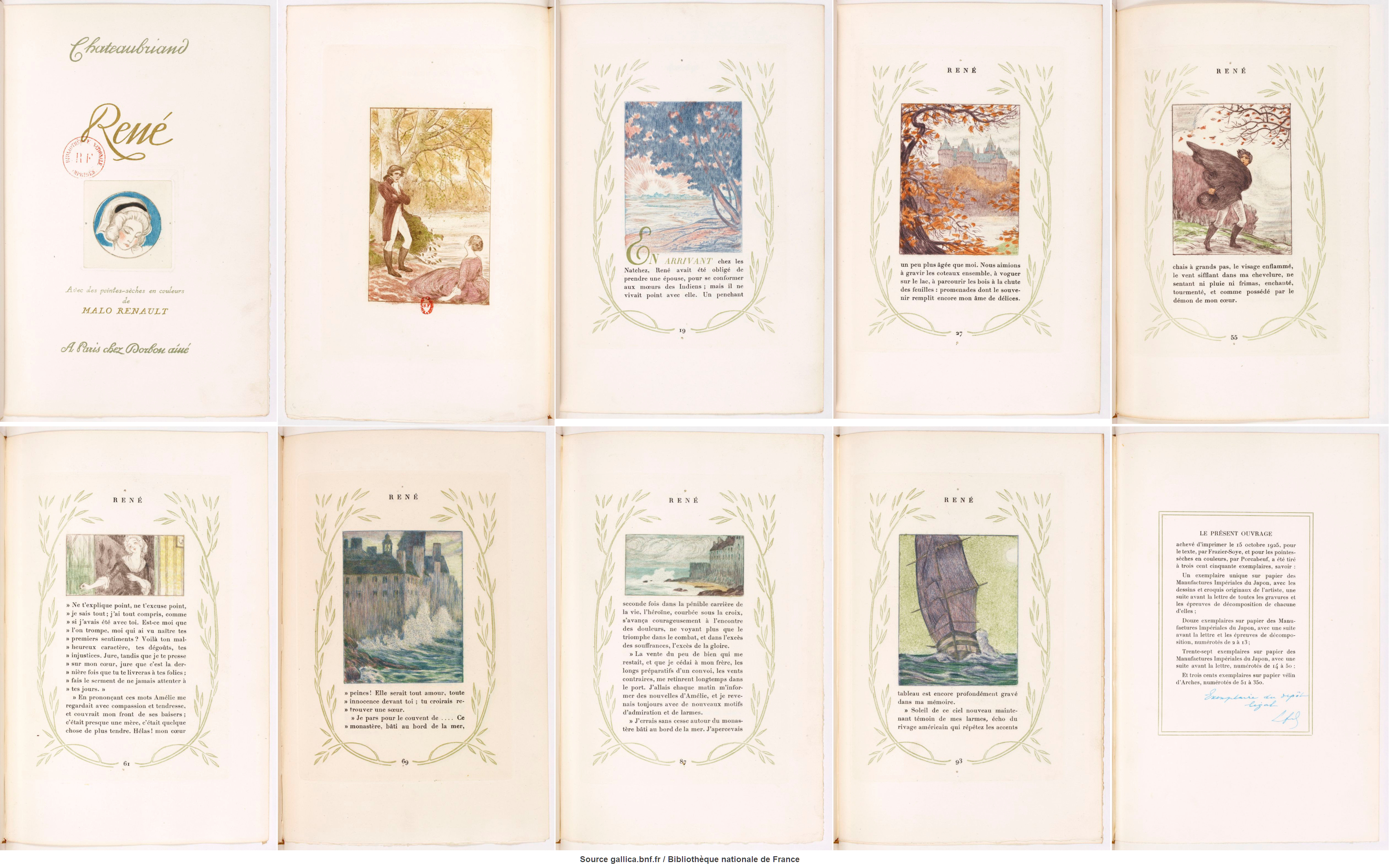
René, autobiographical novel of Chateaubriand. p.s color by Malo-Renault

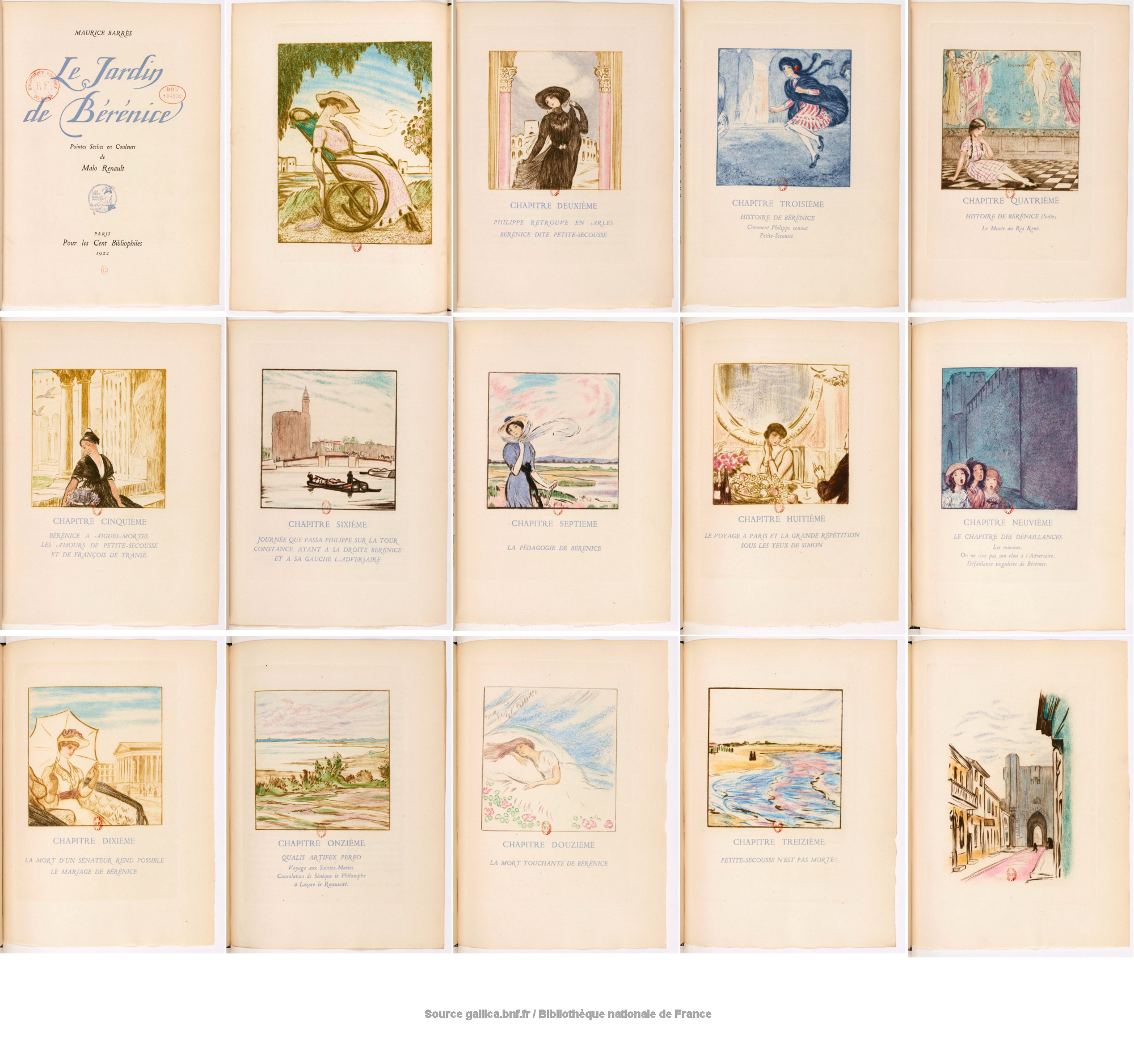
Le jardin de Bérénice, M. Barrès, color drypoint (1922) Malo-Renault

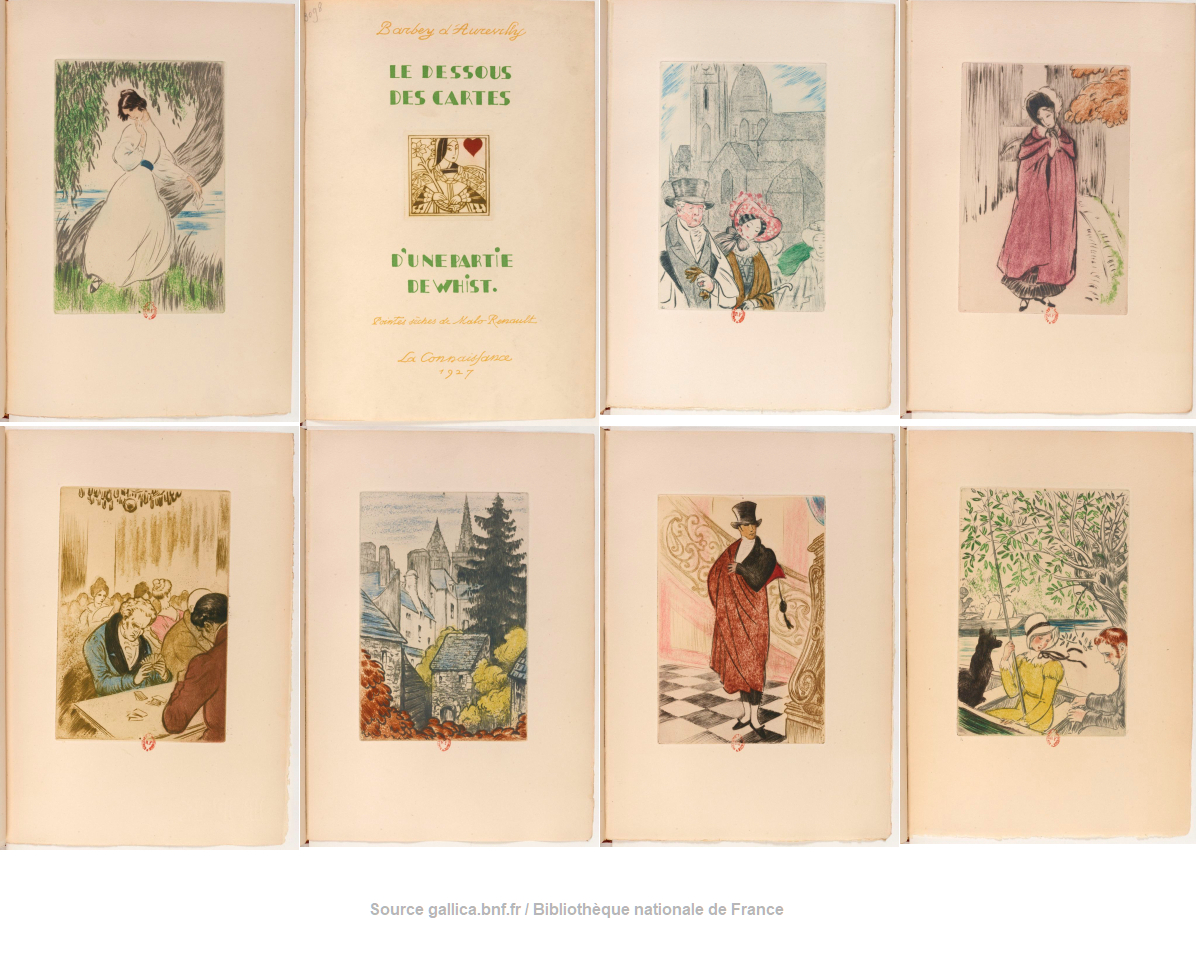
Le dessous des cartes d'une Partie de Whist, J.B. Aurevilly, dryprint prints Malo-Renault (1927)

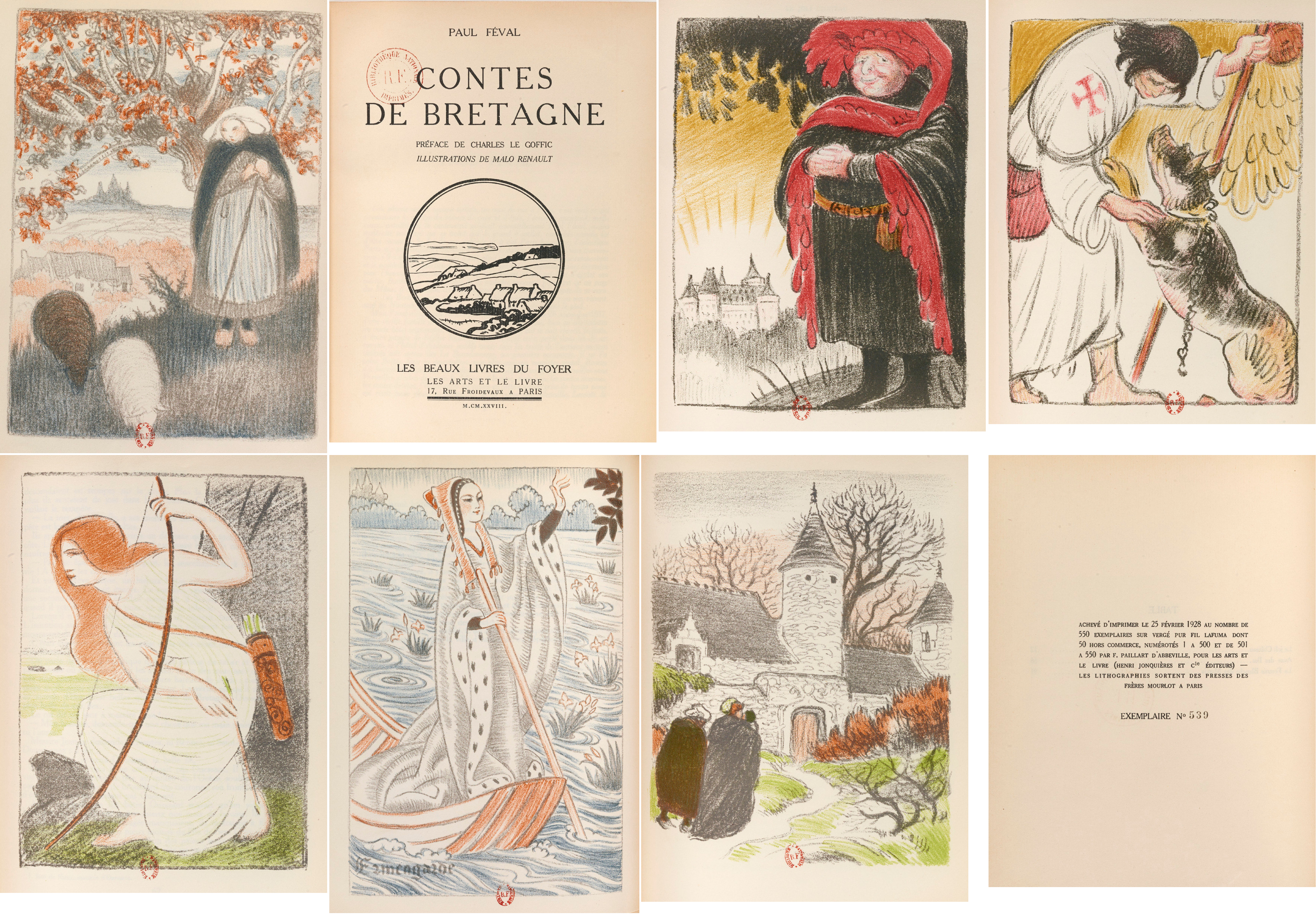
Contes de Bretagne (1928), Lithographies couleur

== Works in public collections ==
- London
  - British Museum
    - A little girl lying in bed, holding four dolls in her arms, drypoint printed in colour
    - Two women sitting on chairs, facing opposite directions, drypoint printed in colour
- Genève
  - Musée d'Art et d'Histoire
    - Cinq Heures rue de la Paix
    - Un Trottin
    - Chez le pâtissier
- Paris :
  - département des arts graphiques du musée du Louvre (ancienne Chalcographie) :
    - Vue de Quimperlé;
    - Saint-Malo;
    - Villeneuve-lès-Avignon, 1925;
    - Vue du Mont Saint-Michel;
    - Petite Baigneuse;
    - Sur le Sable, 39 × 26 cm
    - Le Château de Combourg;
  - département des estampes et de la photographie de la Bibliothèque nationale de France :
    - La Fourrure blanche, vers 1907, pointe-sèche en couleur;
    - Famille de Bigoudens, vers 1907, eau-forte en couleur;
    - Le Cochon, illustration pour Le Rire du 20 avril 1907;
    - 19^{e} Dîner du Moulin à Sel…, 1907, eau-forte;
    - Sirène de Paris, 1908, eau-forte;
    - frontispice pour l'annuaire 1897-1908 de L'Estampe nouvelle, eau-forte et pointe-sèche;
    - La Petite fille aux poupées, 1911–1913, pointe-sèche en couleur;
    - Un trottin, pointe-sèche en couleur;
    - Le Thé chez Rumpelmayer, 1912, pointe-sèche en couleur;
    - Ex-libris André Barrier, vers 1912, pointe-sèche;
    - Tête de Bretonne, 1912, projet d'ex-libris, bois;
    - La Lecture, vers 1912, pointe-sèche en couleur;
    - L'Oreiller, 1912–1913, pointe-sèche en couleur;
    - 12 pointe-sèche pour Modes de Paris, 1912–1913;
    - M^{lle} Jacqueline R., 1913, pointe-sèche en couleur;
    - Dîner des Amis de l'eau-forte, 1913, pointe-sèche;
    - Cinq heures rue de la Paix, 1913, pointe-sèche en couleur;
    - Menu pour la Société des Cent Bibliophiles, eau-forte en couleur (1913). La Bretagne offrant le Serpent noir à cette Société.
    - Sur le sable, vers 1913, eau-forte en couleur;
    - Soins maternels, vers 1913–1914, pointe-sèche en couleur;
    - Vue de Quimperlé, 1913–1919, eau-forte en couleur;
    - La Rose jaune, 1914, pointe-sèche en couleur;
    - Venezia delle Guerra, vers 1917, bois en couleur;
    - La Douloureuse Passion de N.S. Jésus-Christ, par A.C. Emme, 1921, cinq planches;
    - La Queste nocturne; L'Âme consumée; Divin dialogue, trois illustrations pour Saint Jean de la Croix. Les Canciones, 1920, bois;
    - En route de Joris-Karl Huysmans, 1921, deux illustration, bois;
    - Après le Match, 1921, pointe-sèche en couleur;
    - La Vierge de la mer, vers 1921, bois;
    - Chansons de France choisies et accompagnées d'images par Malo-Renault, 1923;
    - Villeneuve-les-Avignon, 1925, eau-forte en couleur;
    - Sonnets pour Hélène, de Ronsard, 1925, pointe-sèches en couleur;
    - Menu pour la Société des Amis des Livres, 2 février 1926, pointe-sèche en couleur;
    - La Tasse de thé, 1926, pointe-sèche en couleur;
    - Vue du Mont-Saint-Michel, vers 1926, pointe-sèche en couleur;
    - Le Château de Combourg, vers 1930;
    - Deux Pommes (cabaret Breton), pointe-sèche en couleur;
    - Illustration pour le Bulletin de l’œuvre de Sainte Clotilde, vers 1930.

=== Illustrated books ===
==== Literature ====
- Jules Renard, Ragotte, etchings in black and white printed intaglio by Geny Gros, Paris, bookstore of the Collection des Dix, A. Ramagnol editions, Paris 1909, 117 p.
- Malo-Renault, Quelques-unes, album, suite engraved in color of 15 Parisienne sketches, preface by Roger Marx, 41 × 29 cm, 1909.
- Paul Adam, Le Serpent noir, text etchings and drypoints in color Les Cent bibliophiles Paris 1913
- Tristan Corbière, La Rapsode foraine et Le pardon de Sainte-Anne 12 woods enhanced with colors, 32 × 26 cm, Flory, 1920, 22 p.
- Maurice Barrès, Le Jardin de Bérénice', 30 drypoint in color, Les Cent bibliophiles 1922. 172 p.
- Jules Renard, Ragotte, etchings in black and white printed intaglio by Geny Gros, 28 × 19 cm, Paris, bookstore of the Collection des Dix, A. Ramagnol editions, 30 dry-points in color, 28 × 20 cm, Les Cent bibliophiles, 1922, 170 p.
- Émile Malo-Renault, Raquettes, text and 6 dry-points in color, 39 × 28 cm, L’Estampe nouvelle, 1923. Edition of 45 signed copies.
- François-René de Chateaubriand, René, 6 dry-points in color and headbands, 28 × 19 cm, prints printed by Porcabeuf, Paris, Dorbon, 1925, 101 p.
- Charles Perrault, Peau d'âne, La Belle au bois dormant, drawings by Malo-Renault, Larousse, 1923.
- J. Barbey d'Aurevilly ,Le dessous des cartes d'une Partie de Whist pointes sèches de Malo Renault La Connaissance (Paris) 1927
- Émile Souvestre,Les mille et une nuits de la Bretagne, (Le foyer Breton), illustrations by Malo Renault, (1929)
- Honoré de Balzac, Ursule Mirouët, Paris, collection « L'Adolescence catholique », 1928.
- Jean des Cognets, D'un vieux Monde, Drawings of Malo-Renault, printed monograph, O.L. Aubert (1932) Saint-Brieuc.
- Paul Féval, Contes de Bretagne, Préface de Charles Le Goffic"

==== Youth literature ====
- Le Roi des Corsaires. Text and drawings by Malo-Renault (14 engravings), Paris, Larousse, 1919, << Les livres roses pour la jeunesse>>, n° 261 (200x130), 32 p
- Charles Perrault, Peau d'âne, La Belle au bois dormant, dessins de Malo-Renault, Larousse, 1923.
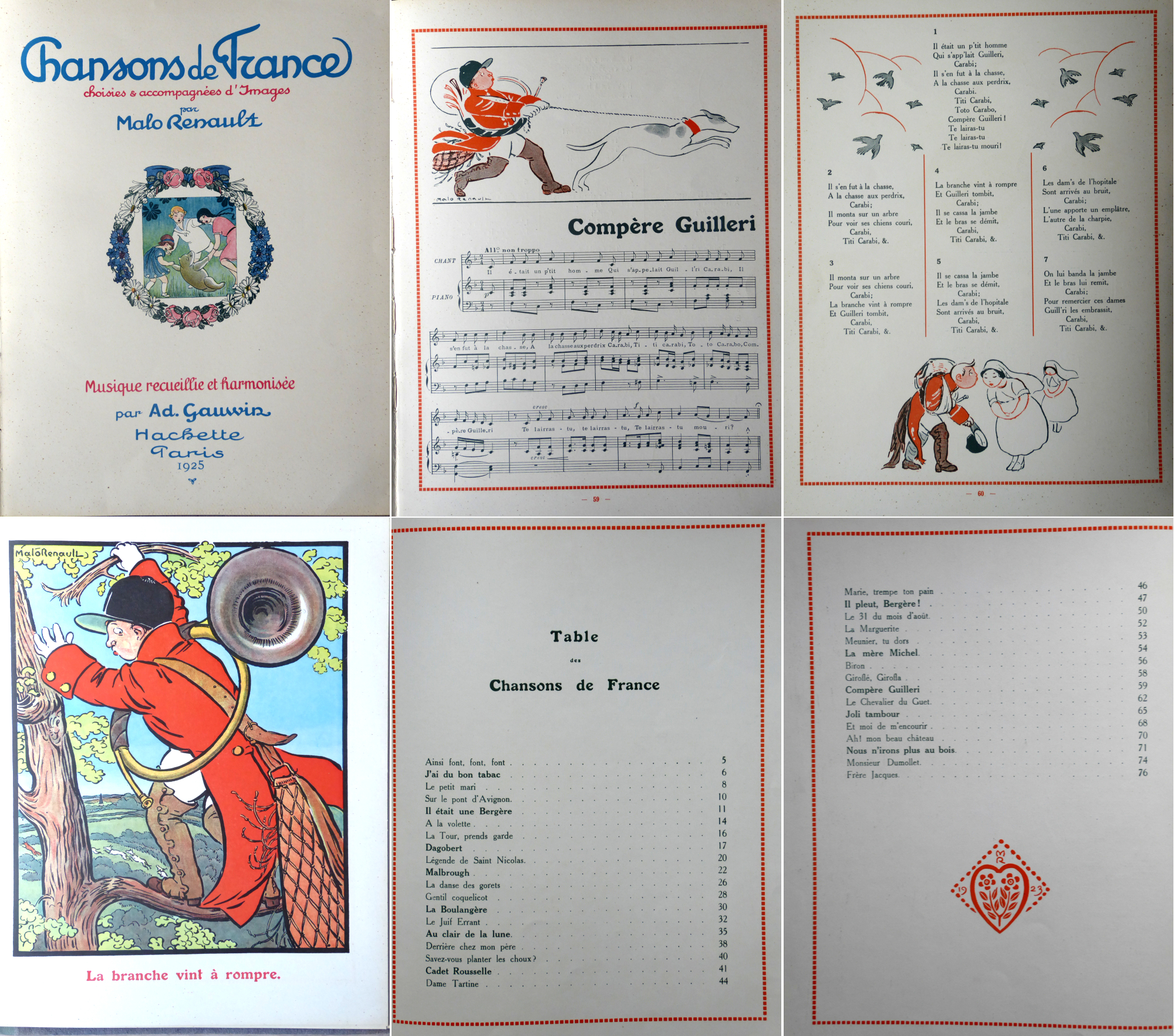
- Chansons de France (1925) illu Malo Renault, musique Ad.Gauwin
  Chansons de France, reunited by Adolphe Gauwin, illustrations by Malo-Renault, Paris, 1923, 1925, 1926, 1928; Hachette, 1931; Hachette Jeunesse, 1993

=== Publications ===
- « Un artiste breton Daniel Mordant », Le Fureteur Breton, April–May 1907, second year, n° 10, p. 167-168.
- « Le peintre Auguste Lemoine », Annales de Société d'histoire et d'archéologique de l'arrondissement de Saint-Malo, 1910, p. 259–270.
- « Charles Le Goffic ». Le Nouvelliste de Bretagne, December 12, 1910.
- « Le Monotype», Art et décoration, February 1920, p. 49-56, 8 engravings.
- « Henri Rivière », Art et décoration, February. 1921, p. 43-51, 10 engravings
- « Les Merveilles du Livre italien », A.B.C magazine de l'art, June 1926, p. 177-181.
- « Sergent-Marceau et Emira Marceau graveurs », L' Amateur d' estampes, 1927
- « La technique d'Henri de Toulouse-Lautrec, graveur ». L'Amateur d'estampes, 6th year, n^{o} 3, May 1927, p. 83–87
- « La gravure sur bois: gravure au canif, gravure au burin, gravure en camaïeu, gravure en couleur », Le Dessin, revue d'art, d' éducation et d'enseignement, October 1930, p. 369-372; et novembre 1930, p. 429-432.
- « La gravure en taille-douce. Le pointillé, la manière noire ou mezzotint, la pointe sèche », Le Dessin, Avril 1931, n° 12, p. 744-749.
- « La gravure en taille-douce (suite). L'eau-forte, l' aquatinte et le vernis mou) », Le Dessin, May 1931, p 46–52.
