= The Groac'h of the Isle of Lok =

Folklore tale

The Groac'h of the Isle of Lok (French: La Groac’h de l’Île du Lok; Breton: Ar Groac'h Enez Lok) is a Breton fairy tale collected by Émile Souvestre in Le Foyer breton. Andrew Lang included it in The Lilac Fairy Book, and Ruth Manning-Sanders included it in A Book of Mermaids.

== Synopsis ==
Two cousins, a young man named Houarn Pogamm and a girl called Bellah Postik, grew up together, and their mothers thought they would marry, but when they came of age, their mothers died. Being penniless, Houarn and Bellah both had to become servants. They lamented their poverty, dreaming of a little farm where they could live, until Houarn decided to go away to seek his fortune. Bellah gave him a bell that could be heard at any distance, but only rang to warn of danger, and a knife that broke spells with its touch. She kept a stick that could carry a person anywhere, so it could carry her to him in need.

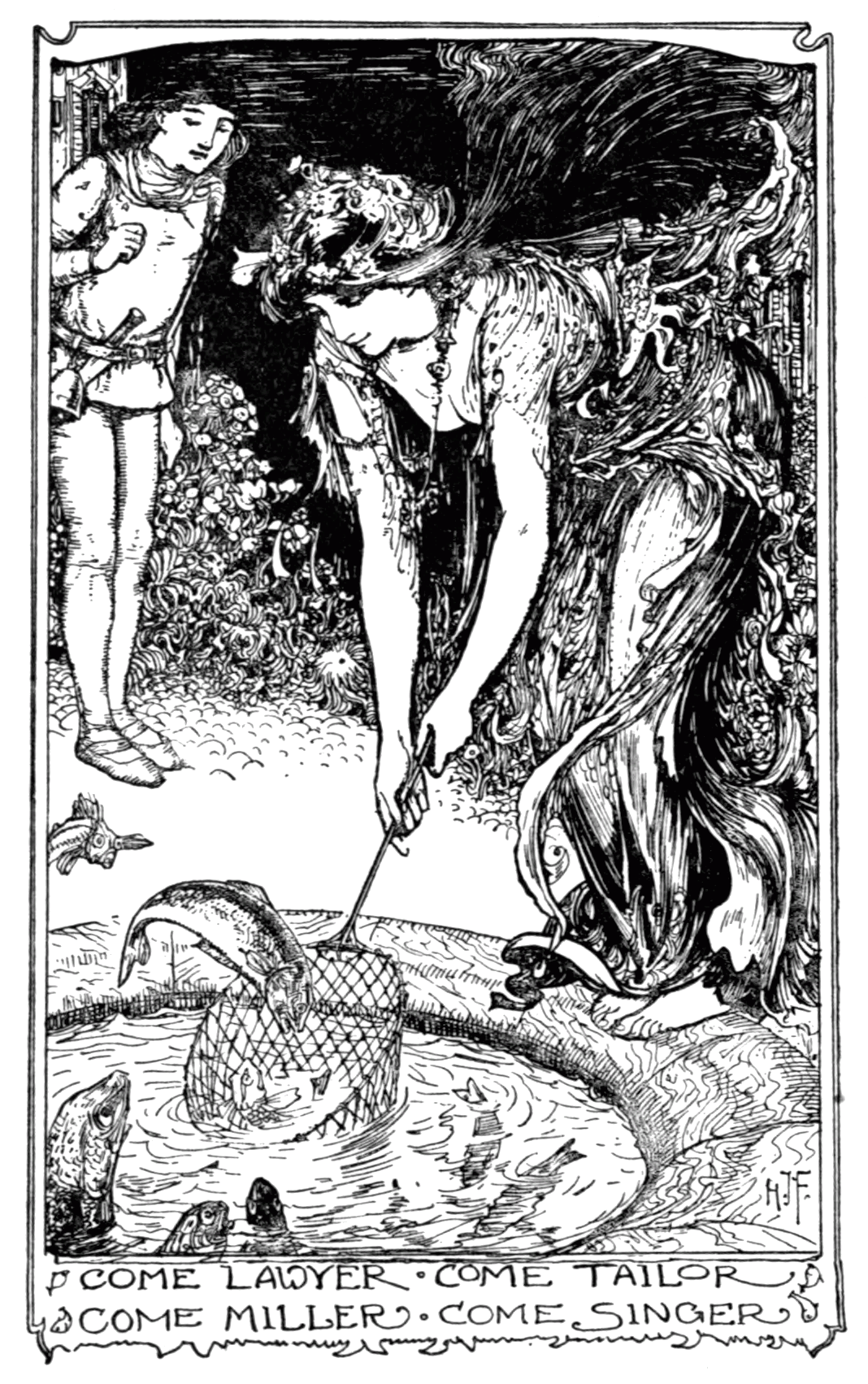

He walked until he heard of the Groac'h of the island of Lok, a rich fairy; no one had ever gone after her treasure and come back. He hired a boatman to carry him to the lake. There he found a boat like a swan, even to having its head under its wing. He stepped on it to see it more clearly, and it swam off with him. He prepared to jump off and swim, but it dived and carried him to the lake bottom, where the Groac'h had her palace. She assured him that he was welcome and told him all her wealth came from shipwrecks. She offered to share it if he would marry her, and he agreed, forgetting Bellah.

After the marriage, she summoned fish into a net, and put them in a pot. He heard cries from it, and when she served him the fish, he remembered Bellah and pulled out the knife. It turned the fish into men. They told him that they, too, had sought their fortune here. He tried to flee, but the Groac'h caught him in her net and turned him into a frog.

The bell rang, and Bellah heard it. She took her stick, and it turned into a horse, and then into a bird that carried her to a nest, where a little black man was. He told her that he was the Groac'h's husband, and that she could free him by freeing Houarn. To do that, she must dress as a man, go to the Groac'h, and get her net. He turned four of his own hairs into tailors to make her a suit out of a cabbage. She went to the Groac'h's, who soon asked Bellah to marry her. Bellah agreed, if the Groac'h would let her use the net to catch a fish in the fishpond. When she got it, she instead turned the Groac'h into a toad with it. With the knife, she freed Houarn and all the others. The little man arrived and gave Bellah and Houarn as much treasure as they could carry. They married, but instead of the little farm, they were able to buy many acres of land, and give all the men freed from the Groac'h enough money to buy small farms of their own.
