= Prix Lambert =

French award to men of letters

The Prix Lambert (French pronunciation: [pʁi lɑ̃bɛʁ]) was an award given out jointly in France by the Académie française and the Académie des Beaux-Arts. It was created in 1853 and awarded to "men of letters" (or their widows) who had served the public interest.

== Laureates ==
- 1963: Paul Minot, Sous les vergnes
- 1962: Henri Moreau, Le Pêcheur d'or
- 1939: (the widow of) André Beaunier, edition of Joubert's Carnets
- 1937: Edmond Joly
- 1935: (the widow of) Jean Bianquis
- 1934: (the widow of) Lucien Nass
- 1906: (the widow of) Amédée Pigeon
- 1904: Jacques Normand
- 1903: Edmond de Mandat-Grancey
- 1901: Mr. Parodi
- 1900: Arthur Roë
- 1899: Mr. Signoret, ms. Yetta Blaze de Bury & Paul Harel
- 1898: Constant Améro for Les Derniers Australiens, Nelly Lieutier for L'Oncle Constantin & Marie Koenig for Aimons les champs
- 1897: René de Pont-Jeste for Le Fleuve des perles
- 1896: Jacques Fréhel
- 1895: Jacques de La Faye for Le général de Laveaucoupet, Charles Buet for L'Aînée & Marie de Grandmaison for Le Petit montagnard
- 1894: Albert Cim for Mes amis et moi, Georges Beaume for Aux Jardins & Louise d'Alq for Anthologie féminine
- 1893: Robert Vallier for Guillemette, Pierre Maël & Théodore Véron
- 1892: Oscar Comettant for Au pays des kangourous & Marie Robert Halt for Le Jeune Théodore
- 1890: Dardenne de La Grangerie & Marie O'Kennedy
- 1888: Jules Ferrand, Léon Ricquier
- 1887: (the widow of) Victor Leclerc
- 1886: Ernest d'Hervilly, Alphonse de Launay & Gabrielle d’Arvor (Élisabeth Isnard de Belley)
- 1885: Émilie Carpentier for Enfants d'Alsace et de Lorraine & Marthe Bertin for Madame Grammaire et ses enfants
- 1884: Médéric Charot for Croquis et Rêveries
- 1883: Jules Levallois & Paul de Pontsevrez for La vie mauvaise
- 1882: Émile Pouvillon for Césette, histoire d'une paysanne
- 1881: Gustave Toudouze for Madame Lambelle
- 1880 (the widow of) Anatole Feugère
- 1879: Pierre-Marie Quitard for La Morale en action
- 1878: Xavier Aubryet
- 1876: Judith Gautier (wife of Catulle Mendès)
- 1875: Éman Martin
- 1874:Édouard Plouvier & Albert Mérat
- 1873: Charles Nisard for Étude sur le langage populaire ou patois de Paris et de sa banlieue and other works
- 1872: Gustave Nadaud
- 1871: (the widow of) Auguste de Belloy for his translations into verse of Plautus and Terence
- 1869: François Coppée, Le Passant
- 1868: Augustine-Malvina Blanchecotte for Impressions d'une femme. Pensées, sentiments et portraits
- 1867: Édouard d'Anglemont & François Barrillot
- 1866: the widow of Eugène Géruzez.
- 1865: Édouard Plouvier
- 1864: The widow of Auguste Cartelier for La traduction du Discours d'Isocrate sur lui-même, intitulé sur l'Antidosis revu et publié avec le texte, une introduction et des notes, par Ernest Havet
- 1863: Léopold Laluyé
- 1862: Philoxène Boyer
- 1861: Frédéric Godefroy for Histoire de la littérature française depuis le xvie siècle jusqu’à nos jours.
- 1860:Élisa Fleury & Thalès Bernard
- 1859:Marceline Desbordes-Valmore
- 1857:Louise Colet
- 1855: (the widow of) Delrieu
- 1854: (the widow of) Émile Souvestre

== See also ==
- Former prizes awarded by the Académie française
