= Vénus de Quinipily =

Ancient statue in Baud, Brittany, France

- Ar groareg Houarn (Breton); Groah Hoart (Breton)
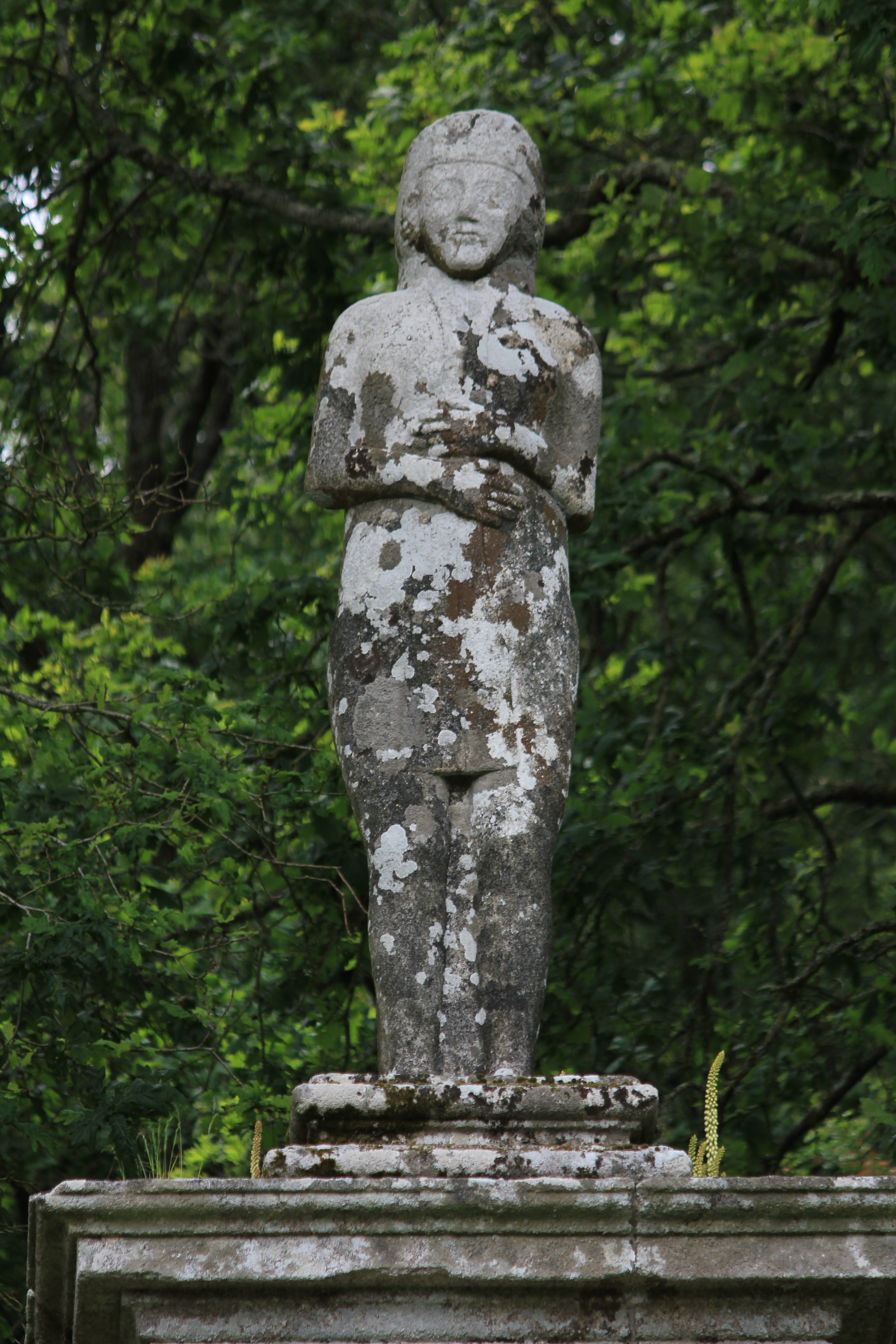
- The statue of Vénus de Quinipily

- Location within France
- 47°52′8″N 3°2′1″W
- Location: The Gardens of Vénus de Quinipily, Baud, Morbihan

History
- Built: circa 49 BC
- Demolished: 1661, 1670
- Rebuilt: 1701

Site notes
- Height: 2.20 meters (7 ft 3 in)
- Restored: 1664, 1695
- Restored by: 1664 (local peasants and devotees), 1695 (Pierre de Lannion)
- Governing body: Monument historique, France
- Owner: Privately owned

Monument historique
- Type: Sculpture
- Criteria: MH43
- Designated: 18 November 1943
- Reference no.: PA00091021
- Country: France
- Region: Baud, Morbihan

The Vénus de Quinipily (French pronunciation: [venys də kinipili], Breton: Ar groareg Houarn/Groah Hoart, English: The Iron Lady) is an ancient statue of uncertain origins, located southeast of Baud, Morbihan, Brittany, in north–western France. It is approximately 2.2 metres (7.2 ft) in height and carved from granite. The statue represents a naked woman and stands in front of a fountain on a 2.75 m high granite pedestal. The large basin beneath the statue is also carved out of a single granite block. It is believed that the statue may be of Greek, Roman or Egyptian origin. There is similar uncertainty about its subject; it may be a Celtic deity, the Roman Mother goddess Cybele, or an Egyptian Isis statue.

It was originally erected at the site of a former Roman camp in Castennec in Bieuzy-les-Eaux, a commune in the Morbihan department in Brittany. It was the centre of superstitious rites in Brittany for centuries and became an object of a pagan veneration. At the request of the Bishop of Vannes, the statue was thrown into the Blavet river twice; first in 1661 and then again in 1670, but recovered both times, first in 1664 and then in 1695 by Pierre de Lannion, the Lord of Blavet Quinipily. In 1701, the statue was substantially altered and placed in its present position at Quinipily where a garden has been created to showpiece the ancient monument.

The statue is classified under Monument historique – a National Heritage Site of France on 24 August 1993. The heritage protection was made applicable from 18 November 1943. It is indexed in the Base Mérimée – a database of architectural heritage maintained by the French Ministry of Culture.

== History ==
=== Origin ===
The origins of the Vénus de Quinipily are uncertain, but it is believed to have been sculpted around 49 BC. It was originally erected at the site of a former Roman camp in Castennec in Bieuzy-les-Eaux, a commune in the Morbihan department in Brittany in northwestern France. Various origins of the statue have been proposed, including Greek, Roman or Egyptian; a Celtic deity, the Roman Mother goddess Cybele, or an Egyptian Isis statue. It has also been proposed that the statue did not survive its restoration in 1696 by Pierre de Lannion, the Lord of Blavet Quinipily, and that he secretly replaced it with a new one. According to the French archaeologist Monsieur de Penhouët, the statue was built by Moorish soldiers in the Roman army.

=== Names ===
During the seventeenth century, the statue was worshiped by pregnant women and had various names in the Breton language such as Er Groach Couard, the "Cowardly Old Woman", or as the "Good Woman", Groah-Goard, la Couarde, or la Gward. The color of the stone from which it was carved also inspired the name Gronech Houarn – The Iron Woman. The statue has also been called Groah Hoart (The Old Guardian). It is said that as the statue stood in the Roman guard house, it was called as Hroech-ar-Gouard, the Old Woman (or Witch) of the Guard-House. The inscriptions on the pedestal say that it is called the Venus Armoricorum Oraculum. The inscriptions also claim that after the Romans conquered Gaul, it was dedicated to Venus Victrix. According to Macquoid, however, the statue could never have been meant to represent a Venus.

=== Related superstitions and rites ===
The statue was an object of superstitious rites in Brittany for centuries. It was believed that sick people would be cured by touching the statue. Childless people would often pay a visit to the statue in the hope of producing offspring. It is said that during seventeenth century "foul", "indecent and obscene" rites were also practiced at the statue, and that many couples performed "erotic" acts near the statue. The statue was also credited with being a sorcerer who would help those who approached her with dignity but would avenge herself on those who neglected to treat her with due honour.

The rituals performed at the statue by pregnant women involved walking round three times, reciting charms and touching one's abdomen. Women would also carry a band which would either be touched to the statue and then tied around their waist, or half of the band would be tied to the statue while the remaining half would be kept on the woman's body until the child was born. After the childbirth, the basin in front of the statue was used by women to bathe in. The rites performed in the honour of the statue were said to be similar to those performed by Phoenicians in the worship of their Venus.

=== Demolition and restoration ===
As the statue became an object of a pagan veneration, missionaries and the Bishop of Vannes Charles de Rosmadec asked Claude de Lannion, Lord of Blavet Quinipily, to destroy the statue. In 1661, Lannion ordered the statue to be thrown into the Blavet river. Abundant rain destroyed the harvest soon after, which peasantry and devotees interpreted as an act of anger by their insulted idol. In 1664, the statue was drawn from the river and restored to its original location.

In 1670, Rosmadec approached Claude de Lannion again and requested him to break the statue into pieces. Lannion ordered this to be done. However, the workmen, for fear of the peasants and devotees, only mutilated one of her breasts and one arm and again threw the statue into the same river. Soon after this, Claude de Lannion fell from his horse and died, which devotees considered as "a judgement from heaven for his having consented to destroy the idol." The statue remained in the river for 25 years until Bishop Rosmadec decided to root out paganism in his diocese and asked Pierre de Lannion, son of Claude de Lannion, to destroy the statue. As Pierre was an antiquarian, he pulled the statue up from the river in 1695 but did not destroy it. The events associated with the demolition and restoration became a local cause célèbre.

=== Modification and ownership ===
In 1696, Pierre de Lannion transported the statue to his château at Quinipily. It is said that it took forty yoke of oxen to drag the statue and the large granite basin there. Soldiers posted along the route from Castennec to Quinipily came to blows with peasants furious at the loss of their idol. Residents of Castennec protested against the "abduction" of the statue and with the help of Duke of Rohan sued Lannion to regain the possession. However, in 1701, the court confirmed the ownership as Lannion's by virtue of his saving it from the river. Supposedly, Pierre damaged the statue during the restoration and secretly replaced it with a new one on a pedestal.

== Design ==
Four Latin inscriptions, one on each side of the pedestal where "Venus" is placed
"PETRUS COMES DE LANNION, PAGANORUM HOC NV MEN POPULIS HUC USQUE VENERABILE SUPERSTI TIONI ERIPUIT IDEM QUE IN HOC LOCO JUSSIT COL LOCARI, ANNO DOM MDCXCVI INI"
"VENUS ARMORICUM ORACULUM. DUCE JULIO, C.C. CLAUDIO MARCELLO ET L. CORNELIO LENTULO COSS AB V.C. DCCV"	North		"PETRUS COMES DE LANNION, PAGANORUM HOC NV MEN POPULIS HUC USQUE VENERABILE SUPERSTI TIONI ERIPUIT IDEM QUE IN HOC LOCO JUSSIT COL LOCARI, ANNO DOM MDCXCVI INI"
"VENUS ARMORICUM ORACULUM. DUCE JULIO, C.C. CLAUDIO MARCELLO ET L. CORNELIO LENTULO COSS AB V.C. DCCV"	West	East	"PETRUS COMES DE LANNION, PAGANORUM HOC NV MEN POPULIS HUC USQUE VENERABILE SUPERSTI TIONI ERIPUIT IDEM QUE IN HOC LOCO JUSSIT COL LOCARI, ANNO DOM MDCXCVI INI"
"VENUS ARMORICUM ORACULUM. DUCE JULIO, C.C. CLAUDIO MARCELLO ET L. CORNELIO LENTULO COSS AB V.C. DCCV"	South		"PETRUS COMES DE LANNION, PAGANORUM HOC NV MEN POPULIS HUC USQUE VENERABILE SUPERSTI TIONI ERIPUIT IDEM QUE IN HOC LOCO JUSSIT COL LOCARI, ANNO DOM MDCXCVI INI"
"CAESAR GALLIA TOTA SUBACTA DICTATORIS INDE NOMINE CAPTO AD BRITTANIAM TRANSGRESSUS NON SEIPSUM TANTUM SED PATRIAM VICTOR CORONAVIT"

The seven-foot tall "Venus" statue represents a naked woman standing in front of a huge but dilapidated fountain on a nine foot high granite pedestal. Her arms are wrapped around her belly, and the lower part of the body consists of straight legs placed slightly apart. The breasts are damaged, and the hair is straight. The statue wears two bands as her only ornamentation. The first band is tied around head whereas the other is around the neck, with the ends hanging down in front of the body, reaching down to the thighs, and broad enough to cover the genital area.

The statue wears a fillet with three large letters; either "I. I. T.", "I. T. T.", "J. I. T." or "L. I. T." engraved on it. These letters may have been engraved when Pierre de Lannion re-chiseled the statue and may have originally read "ILITHYIA", the Greek goddess of childbirth. It is also speculated that these letters were carved later by one of the young Roman officers to amuse himself by carving his initials on the forehead. The fingers and toes of "Venus" are represented by lines and the facial expression has distinct similarities to those of Egyptian idols.

The large cistern beneath the statue is carved out of a single granite block, filled with water. It is believed that Pierre de Lannion was "deceived" by the nature of the worship paid to the statue, thus he placed the statue above a pedestal with Latin inscriptions, one on each side of it. It is believed that the design has oriental influences, but it may not be a Gallo-Roman design.

The statue was classified under Monument historique – a National Heritage Site of France on 24 August 1993, with the identification number 88378. The heritage protection was made applicable from 18 November 1943. It is indexed in the Base Mérimée – a database of architectural heritage maintained by the French Ministry of Culture, under the reference PA00091021.

== Bibliography ==
- A Handbook for Travellers in France. John Murray. 1864. p. 149. OCLC 13350366.
- Bradshaw, George; Hughes, John William C. (1897). Bradshaw's hand-book to Brittany. BiblioBazaar. p. 122. ISBN 978-1-145-67819-4.
- DK Eyewitness Travel Guide: Brittany: Brittany. Dorling Kindersley. 2011. ISBN 978-0-7566-8431-0.
- D'Anvers, N; Bell, Arthur George (1906). Picturesque Brittany. J. M. Dent & Company. p. 165. ISBN 978-1-147-15229-6.
- Douglas-Cooper, Helen; Mellor, Barbara (2000). Secret France: Charming Villages & Country Tours. W. W. Norton & Company. ISBN 978-0-393-31942-2.
- Hare, Augustus (1896). North-western France: (Normandy and Brittany). Macmillan Publishers. p. 237. ISBN 978-1-177-34117-2.
- Freitag, Barbara (2004). Sheela-na-gigs: Unravelling an Enigma. Taylor & Francis. ISBN 978-0-203-33820-9.
- Leslie, Forbes (1866). The Early Races of Scotland and Their Monuments. Edmonston and Douglas. p. 94. OCLC 5235249.
- Macbain, Alexander (1885). Celtic Mythology and Religion. Kessinger Publishing. p. 91. ISBN 978-0-7661-3562-8.
- Macquoid, Katharine Sarah (1877). Through Brittany. South Brittany. General Books LLC. p. 186. ISBN 978-0-217-30682-9.
- MacCulloch, J. A. (2010). The Religion of the Ancient Celts. MobileReference. ISBN 978-1-60778-803-4.
- Markale, Jean (1999). The Great Goddess: Reverence of the Divine Feminine from the Paleolithic to the Present. Inner Traditions – Bear & Company. ISBN 978-0-89281-715-3.
- Monk Kidd, Sue; Kidd Taylor, Ann (2009). Traveling with Pomegranates: A Mother and Daughter Journey to the Sacred Places of Greece, Turkey, and France. Penguin Books. ISBN 978-1-101-14491-6.
- Murray-Aynsley, Harriet Georgiana Maria Manners-Sutton (1900). Symbolism of the East and West. University of Wisconsin–Madison. p. 87. ISBN 978-0-8103-3395-6.
- Spence, Lewis (1917). "Accessories of Cult". Legends and Romances of Brittany. Chapter XIX: Dover Publications. ISBN 0-486-29660-1.
- Spence, Lewis (1917). "Costumes and Customs of Brittany". Legends and Romances of Brittany. Chapter XIII: Dover Publications. ISBN 0-486-29660-1.
- Trollope, Thomas Adolphus (1840). Trollope, Frances (ed.). A summer in Brittany. Vol. 2. H. Colburn. ISBN 978-1-151-11128-9.
- Ward, Greg (2003). Brittany and Normandy. Rough Guides. ISBN 978-1-84353-076-3.
- Worth, George J. (1876). "The "Venus" of Quinipily". Macmillan's Magazine. Vol. 34. Macmillan and Company. ISBN 978-0-7546-0986-5.
