= Émile Nourry =

French publisher, bookseller and folklorist

Émile Nourry (December 6, 1870 in Autun, France – April 27, 1935 in Paris) was a French publisher, bookseller, and folklorist known under the pen name Pierre Saintyves (P. Saintyves, sometimes incorrectly given as Paul Saintyves).

He was President of the Society of French Folklore (Société de folklore français et de folklore colonial), director of Revue du folklore français and Revue anthropologique, as well as Maître de conférences at the School of Anthropology, Paris.

P. Saintyves is credited with the hypothesis that many common folktales originate in pagan rituals, published in his Les Contes de Perrault et les récits parallèles, 1923.

== Works ==
- La Réforme intellectuelle du clergé et la liberté d'enseignement, Nourry, 1904
- Le miracle et la critique historique, Nourry, 1907
- Les saints successeurs des dieux. I. L'origine du culte des saints II. Les sources des légendes hagiographiques. III. La mythologie des noms propres, Nourry, 1907
- Les Vierges mères et les naissances miraculeuses, 1908
- Les reliques et les images légendaires. Le miracle de Saint Janvier, Les reliques du Buddha, Les images qui ouvrent et ferment les yeux, Les reliques corporelles du Christ, Talismans et reliques tombés du ciel, Mercure de France, 1912, 340 p.
- La force magique : du mana des primitifs au dynamisme scientifique, Émile Nourry, 1914
- Les Responsabilités de l'Allemagne dans la guerre de 1914, 1915
- Les Liturgies populaires : rondes enfantines et quêtes saisonnières, Edition du livre mensuel, 1919
- Les origines de la médecine : empirisme ou magie ?, Nourry, 1920
- L'éternuement et le bâillement dans la magie. L'ethnographie et le folklore médical, 1921. Rééd. Savoir pour être, 1995.
- Essais de folklore biblique. Magie, mythes et miracles dans l'Ancien et le Nouveau Testament, Émile Nourry, 1922
- Les Contes de Perrault et les récits parallèles, Émile Nourry, 1923, XXIV-646 p.
- La légende du docteur Faust, L'édition d'art, 1926
- En marge de la Légende dorée, Paris, Émile Nourry, 1931
- Les cinquante jugements de Salomon ou les arrêts des bons juges, d'après la tradition populaire, Editions Domat-Montchrestien, 1933
- Corpus du folklore des eaux en France et dans les colonies françaises, Émile Nourry, 1934, IV-270 p.
- Corpus du Folklore préhistorique (pierres à légendes), Nourry, 1934–1936, 510p.
- Manuel de folklore. Lettre-préface de Sébastien Charléty, J. Thiébaud, 1936, 229 p.
- Pierres magiques : bétyles, haches-amulettes et pierres de foudre. Traditions savantes et traditions populaires, J. Thiébaud, 1936, 296 p.
- Saint Christophe : successeur d'Anubis, d'Hermès et d'Héraclès, 1936, 55 p.
- L'astrologie populaire étudiée spécialement dans les doctrines et les traditions relatives à l'influence de la Lune. Essai de méthode dans l'étude du Folklore des opinions et des croyances, J. Thiébaud, 1937, 472 p. Editions du Rocher, 1989.
- Deux mythes évangéliques, les douze apôtres et les 72 disciples, Émile Nourry, 1938
