= Le Foyer breton =

1844 collection of Breton stories by Émile Souvestre

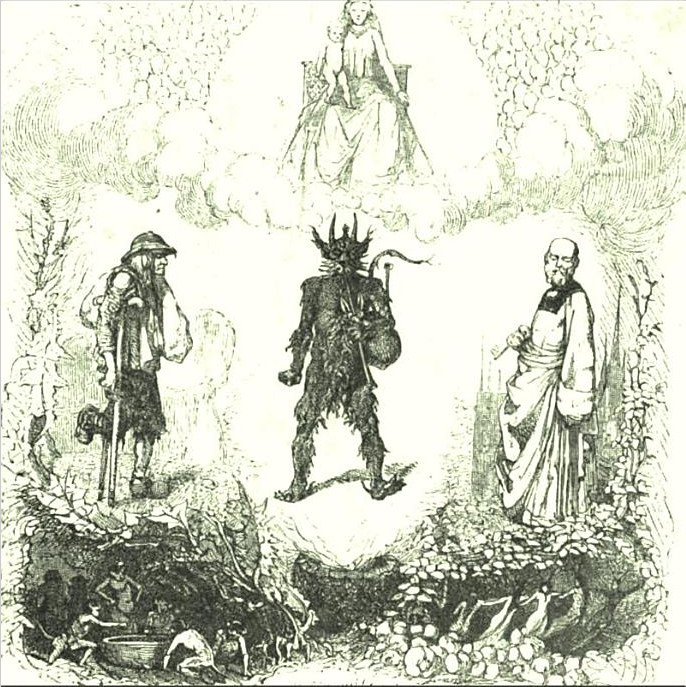
- Cover of the first edition
- Author: Émile Souvestre
- Illustrator: Tony Johannot, O. Penguilly, A. Leleux, C. Fortin and Saint-Germain
- Cover artist: Octave Penguilly
- Language: French
- Genre: Short story collection
- Set in: Brittany
- Publisher: W. Coquebert
- Publication date: 1844
- Publication place: France
- Pages: 238 (first edition)
- Dewey Decimal: 398.21

Le Foyer breton (French pronunciation: [lə fwa.je bʁə.tɔ̃]; in English: The Breton Hearth, or The Breton Home; Breton: An Ti Breizh) is a collection of Breton stories by Émile Souvestre, written in French and published in 1844. This work is a collection of Breton folktales arranged by their place of origin. It was an immediate success, becoming the foremost work of prose narrative in Brittany and inspiring several of the writer Ernest du Laurens de la Barre's works. It has been republished several times.

== Debate over its authenticity ==
The republication of Le Foyer breton by Jean Vigneau in 1947 started a long debate as to the authenticity of the stories collected by Souvestre, in which he was accused of having rearranged or, worse, totally rewritten them. In particular, Gourvil considered that "Souvestre did not weave the fabric of any of his tales, but was content to dress up à la bretonne those traditional stories which lacked the scenery and characteristics of the nation that he wanted to celebrate in his own way". In his investigation of the French folk tale, the specialist Paul Delarue definitively places the stories of Le Foyer breton among the "fabricated tales".

== Contents ==
- La Ferme des nids
- Comorre
- Les Trois Rencontres
- Jean Rouge-gorge
- La Forge isolée
- Les Lavandières de nuit
- La Groac'h de l'Île du Lok
- Invention des Ballins
- Teuz-ar-Pouliet
- L'Île de Saint-Nicolas
- Keris
- La Souris de terre et le corbeau gris
- La Hutte du sabotier
- Le Diable devenu recteur
- Les Korils de Plaudren
- Peronnik l'idiot
- Les Pierres de Plouhinec

== La Groac'h de l'Île du Lok ==
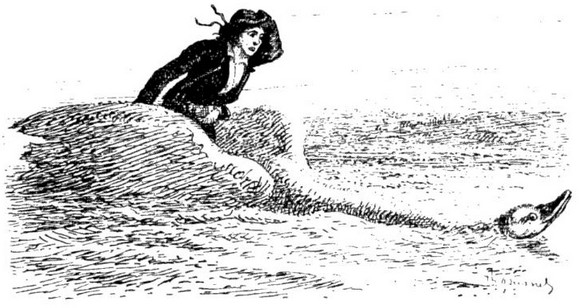
Houarn in the groac'h's magic boat. Engraving after Théophile Busnel, from Contes et légendes de Basse-Bretagne (1891).

The seventh tale, La Groac'h de l'Île du Lok, is the most famous story evoking a groac'h, a sort of Breton fairy sorceress.

Houarn Pogamm and Bellah Postik, orphan cousins, grow up together in Lannilis and fall in love, but they are poor, so Houarn leaves to seek his fortune. Bellah gives him a little bell and a knife, but keeps a third magic object for herself, a wand. Houarn arrives at Pont-Aven and hears about the groac'h of Lok Island, a fairy who inhabits a lake on the largest of the Glénan Islands, reputed to be as rich as all the kings on earth put together. Houarn goes to the island of Lok and gets into an enchanted boat in the shape of a swan, which takes him underwater to the home of the groac'h. This beautiful woman asks him what he wants, and Houarn replies that he is looking for the wherewithal to buy a little cow and a lean hog. The fairy offers him some enchanted wine to drink and asks him to marry her. He accepts, but when he sees the groac'h catch and fry fish which moan in the pan he begins to be afraid and regrets his decision. The groac'h gives him the dish of fried fish and goes away to look for wine. Houarn draws his knife, whose blade dispels enchantments. All the fish stand up and become little men. They are victims of the groac'h, who agreed to marry her before being metamorphosed and served as dinner to the other suitors. Houarn tries to escape but the groac'h comes back and throws at him the steel net she wears on her belt, which turns him into a frog. The bell he carries on his neck rings, and Bellah hears it at Lannilis. She takes hold of her magic wand, which turns itself into a fast pony, then into a bird to cross the sea. At the top of a rock, Bellah finds a little black korandon, the groac'h's husband, and he tells her of the fairy's vulnerable point. The korandon offers Bellah men's clothes to disguise herself in. She goes to the groac'h, who is very happy to receive such a beautiful boy and yields to the request of Bellah, who would like to catch her fish with the steel net. Bellah throws the net on the fairy, cursing her thus: "Become in body what you are in heart!". The groac'h changes into a hideous creature, the queen of mushrooms, and is thrown into a well. The metamorphosed men and the korandon are saved, and Bellah and Houarn take the treasures of the fairy, marry and live happily ever after.

For the scholar Joseph Rio this tale is important documentary evidence on the character of the groac'h. Souvestre explained why he chose to place it on the island of Lok by the multiplicity of versions of the storytellers which do so. La Groac'h de l'île du Lok was even more of a success in Germany than it had been in Brittany. Heinrich Bode published it under the title of Die Wasserhexe in 1847, and it was republished in 1989 and 1993.

== Editions ==
- Le Foyer breton. Traditions populaires (W. Coquebert, 1844)
- Le Foyer Breton. Contes et Récits populaires (Nelson Éditeurs, n.d. [between 1911 and 1925])
- Le Foyer breton. Traditions populaires illustrées d'après l'édition originale (Jean Vigneau, 1947)
- Le Foyer breton (Bibliothèque Marabout, 1975)

== English translations from Le Foyer breton ==
Though Le Foyer breton has never been translated into English in its entirety there have been several English translations and adaptations of stories from it. These include:

- Patrick Kennedy Legendary Fictions of the Irish Celts (1866). Includes a version of Les Korils de Plaudren.
- Andrew Lang The Lilac Fairy Book (1910). Includes retellings of 5 of the stories in Le Foyer breton.
- George Moore Peronnik the Fool (1921).
- G. H. Doble The Rector of Concoret: or, The Devil Turned Rector (1925). A dramatization of Le Diable devenu recteur.
- Roseanna Hoover (trans.) Peronnique: A Celtic Folk Tale from Brittany (1970).
- Marjorie Dixon (trans.) Breton Fairy Tales (1971). Includes 10 of the stories.
- Re Soupault (ed.), Ruth E. K. Meuss (trans.) Breton Folktales (1971). Includes versions of Peronnik l'idiot, La Groac'h de l'Île du Lok, Comorre and Keris.
- [Anonymous] Peronnik: A Fairy Tale of the Grail Quest (1984).
