= Émile Souvestre =

Breton novelist

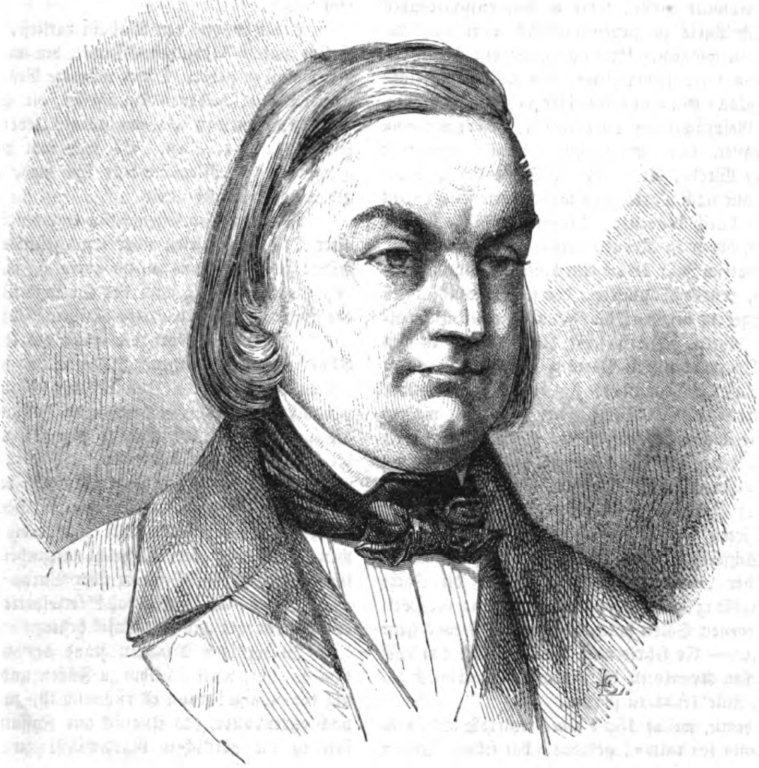
- Born: 15 April 1806; Morlaix, France
- Died: 5 July 1854 (aged 48); Montmorency, France
- Occupation: Writer

Émile Souvestre (15 April 1806 – 5 July 1854) was a Breton novelist who was a native of Morlaix, Brittany. Initially unsuccessful as a writer of drama, he fared better as a novelist (he wrote a sci-fi novel, Le Monde Tel Qu'il Sera) and as a researcher and writer of Breton folklore. He was posthumously awarded the Prix Lambert.

== Biography ==
=== Education ===
He was the son of a civil engineer and was educated at the college of Pontivy, with the intention of following his father's career by entering the Polytechnic School. However, his father died in 1823 and he matriculated as a law student at Rennes but soon devoted himself to literature.

He was by turns a bookseller's assistant and a private schoolmaster in Nantes, a journalist and a grammar school teacher in Brest and a teacher in Mulhouse. He settled in Paris in 1836. In 1848 he became professor in the school for the instruction of civil servants initiated by Hippolyte Carnot, but which was soon to be cancelled.

=== Literary career ===
He began his literary career with a drama, the Siege de Missolonghi, performed at the Théâtre français in 1828. This tragedy was a pronounced failure. In novel writing he did much better than for the stage, deliberately aiming at making the novel an engine of moral instruction. His first two novels L'Echelle de Femmes and Riche et Pauvre met with favourable receptions.

Souvestre published a series of articles in 1834 on Breton culture, and then an article on Breton poetry. These were combined and published as Les Derniers Bretons (4 vols, 1835–1837), followed by Le Foyer breton (1844), where the folklore and natural features of his native province are worked up into story form, and in Un Philosophe sous les toits, which received in 1851 an academic prize. He also wrote a number of other works—novels, dramas, essays and miscellanies.

In 1846, Souvestre published the ambitious Le Monde Tel Qu'il Sera [The World As It Will Be], a full-blown dystopia and science fiction novel which featured some remarkable predictions. In it, a French couple, Maurice and Marthe are taken to the year 3000 by a man named John Progress on a flying, steam-powered, Time traveling locomotive. There, they discover the existence of steam-powered subways, submarines, synthetic materials imitating real wood, marble, etc., telephone, air conditioning, giant fruits and vegetables obtained through what we would call today genetic engineering, etc. The world is one nation, the capital of which is Tahiti. Parenting has vanished, because most children are removed from their parents and taken to places where eugenics, genetic manipulation, and different forms of education give rise to somewhat human grotesques tailored for specific tasks. Corporations have enough power to influence government decisions to ensure good profit margins. The medical community manipulates people to ensure that they are seriously sick when they enter, and conducts medical experiments on animals. This is paid for by cutting costs in the food the patients receive. No sympathy or encouragement is given to the poor or disabled. China has become inactive and listless, going into a steep decline after their socio-economic structure was ruined by opium, and wars and murders occur in Persia for idiotic religious reasons. Russia seems more or less a backwater obscurity, and Germany is a jingoistic nation that permits freedom while undermining it at the same time.

=== Death and legacy ===
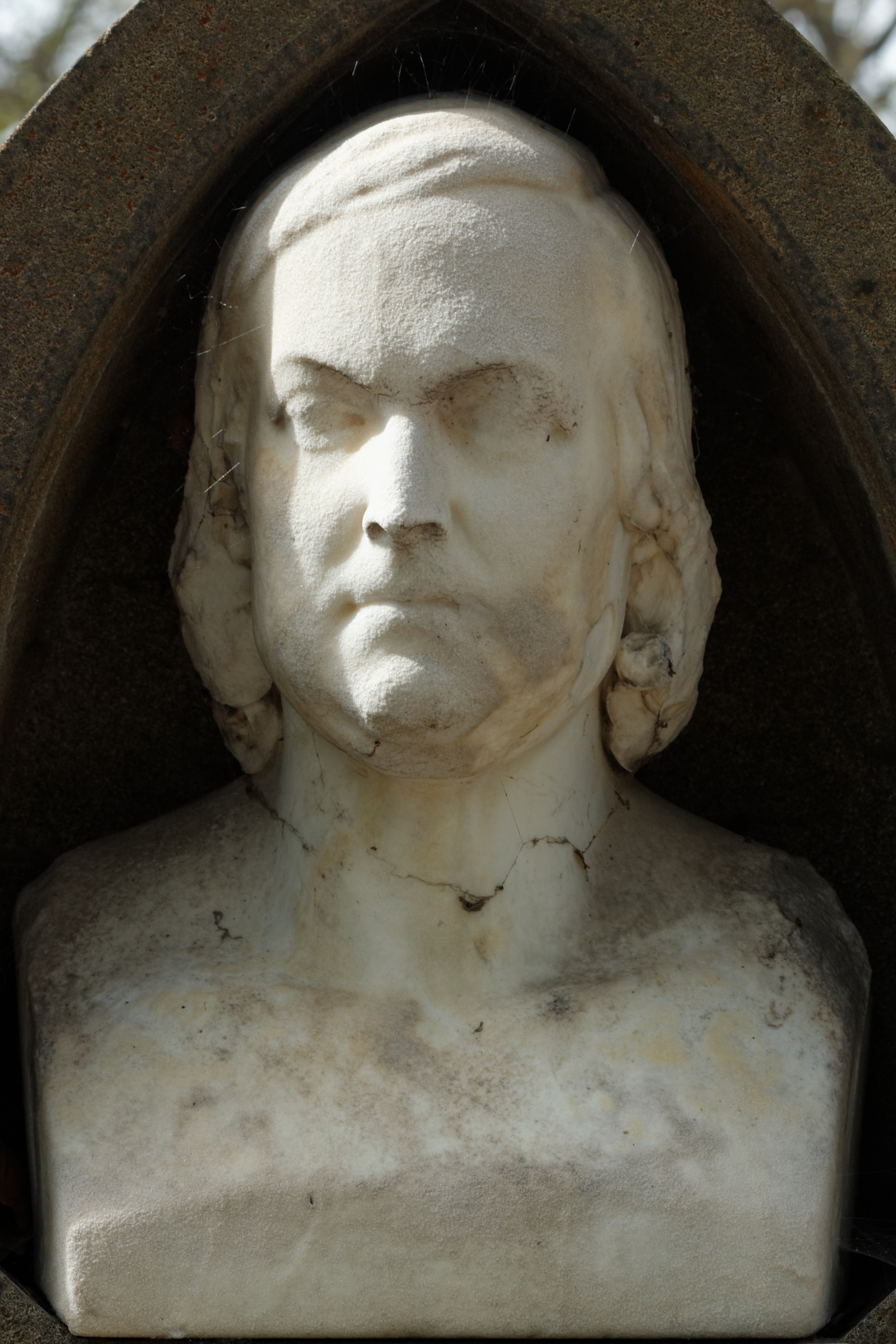
Bust of Émile Souvestre

Souvestre died in Paris on 5 July 1854. His widow was awarded the Prix Lambert, awarded jointly by the Académie française and the Académie des Beaux-Arts, for the moral quality of his work. French sculptor and Souvestre's friend Philippe Grass made his portrait on his tomb at the Père Lachaise Cemetery.

Marie Souvestre, the feminist writer and educator who was a major influence on Eleanor Roosevelt, was his daughter.

== Works ==
- Un Philosophe sous les toits
- Confessions d'un ouvrier
- Au coin du feu
- Scènes de la vie intime
- Chroniques de la mer
- Les Clairières
- Scènes de la Chouannerie
- Dans la Prairie
- Les derniers Paysans
- En quarantaine
- Sur la Pelouse
- Les Soirées de Meudon
- Souvenirs d'un Vieillard, la dernière Étape
- Scènes et Récits des Alpes
- Les Anges du Foyer
- L'Echelle de femmes
- La Goutte d'eau
- Sous les Filets
- Le Foyer breton
- Contes et Nouvelles
- Les derniers Bretons
- Les Réprouvés et les Élus
- Les Péchés de jeunesse
- Riche et Pauvre
- En Famille
- Pierre et Jean
- Deux Misères
- Les Drames parisiens
- Au bord du Lac
- Pendant la Moisson
- Sous les Ombrages
- Le Mat de Cocagne
- Le Mémorial de famille
- Souvenirs d'un Bas-Breton
- L'Homme et l'Argent
- Le Monde tel qu'il sera
- Histoires d'autrefois
- Sots la Tonnelle
