= Bugul Noz =

Fairy spirit in Breton mythology

The Bugul Noz ([byɡylˈnoːs] "Night Shepherd" or "child of the night") is a nocturnal fairy or bogeyman-like being in Breton folklore, from Morbihan, Brittany.

== Descriptions and mythology ==
Sources commonly describe it as a little man, goblin or kobold. Émilie Carpentier described the Bugul-Noz as a little man with claws, fiery eyes, and a whistling voice, who threatened shepherds and workers who linger outside after dark. In one story, the "bugul noz" rides at night, although he turns back at the sight of crossroads to avoid the shape of the cross. If he takes a person prisoner, he will drown them as soon as the cock crows.

Anatole Le Braz, a professor of French Literature, heard of the Bugul-Noz as a tall, foreboding figure who appears at twilight. One informant suggested that rather than a threatening figure, the Bugul-Noz was a benevolent spirit influencing people not to linger outside where it was not safe after dark. The Bugul-Noz was compared to Yann-An-Od.

The Bugul-Noz has also been described as having an animal pelt that allows it to take a wolf-like form and wearing a large hat and cloak. In this version, the Bugul-Noz grows larger as he approaches his victims.

Other sources have described it as an undead spirit or as a werewolf that steals children by hiding them under his hat.

Another version of the Bugul-noz is of a creature that is the last of his kind. In this version, he is aware of how terrifying he looks and calls out to warn travelers so they won't be frightened to death. He is described as a sort of Bogyman for adults, to scare them into going straight home after work.
