= Jetins =

Small creatures from Brittany folklore

Creature information
- Grouping: Little people
- Sub grouping: Lutin
- Similar entities: Fras, Fions, Tréo-Fall
- Folklore: Breton mythology

Origin
- Region: Ille-et-Vilaine, Guernsey, Channel Islands, France
- Habitat: Caves and grottes of the Normandy coast, called houles

Jetins are small, imaginary creatures from Brittany, mostly mentioned by Paul Sébillot along the coast of Ille-et-Vilaine and on the island of Guernsey. Compared with similar lutins, they are characterized by their great strength, enabling them to throw huge boulders over very long distances, and by their habitat, mainly in rocks and caves on the shore. They also have a habit, much feared by humans, of kidnapping beautiful babies to replace them with their old-fashioned changelings. Pierre Dubois gives many details on the appearance of Jetins in La Grande Encyclopédie des lutins.

== Etymology and terminology ==
The name varies from Jetins to J'tins or J'tuns. These names derive from the Jetins' habit of throwing rocks (and hence the word "jeter", which means "to throw" in French). Françoise Morvan assumes that, like the Fions to whom they are closely related, they come from the fairies of English folklore, notably because of their habitat in sea caves known as "houles" (from the word hole in English). However, the limited amount of information available about them means that we don't know much more. In Saint-Suliac, the Bec-Dupuy cave is also known as "Trou aux Jetins".

== Characteristics ==
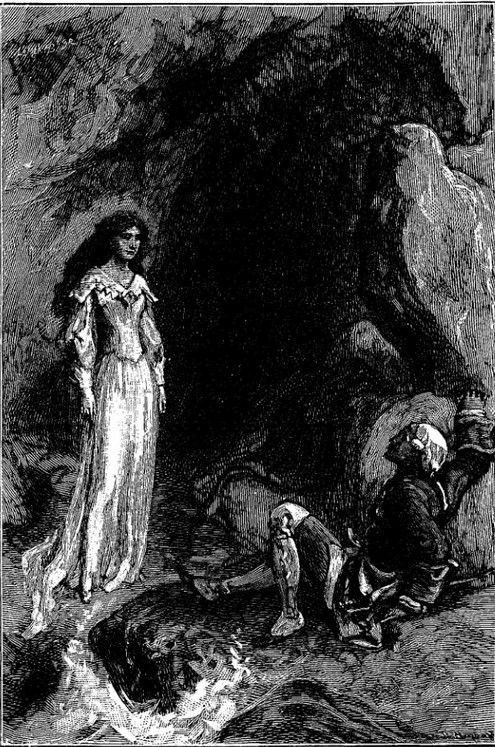
A houles fairy, occupying the same type of cave habitat as the Jetins.

Paul Sébillot collects most of the traditions about them. The Jetins are found in several maritime locations in Upper Brittany, along the Ille-et-Vilaine coastline and notably on one of the Channel Islands, Guernsey. They enjoy the banks of the Rance river.

These dwarves are said to live "in the houles", sea caves, but don't seem to share the company of the houles fairies. Guernsey's caves may be frequented either by these fairies or by the Jetins. According to testimony gathered by Sébillot, they look like little men a foot and a half tall. Those from the banks of the Rance, reputed to be very playful, come out of their holes every evening to amuse themselves in the countryside, in particular by playing tricks such as tangling horses' manes, making pigs run and opening hen houses. Jetins are generous by nature, however, and will gladly give bread, bacon or sausages to anyone who asks. Just don't try to keep one of their knives. One man found himself pinned to the ground by these little creatures, as punishment for trying to steal a utensil, until he agreed to return it. Their main characteristic is the throwing of stones "as big as a house" up to a league away: this is how the Bretons explained the presence of gigantic stones in the middle of their fields.

== Changelings ==
The Jetins also replace human babies with their old-fashioned changelings, who never grow and suckle incessantly. According to a testimony collected by Sébillot in 1891 in Saint-Suliac, the Jetins kidnapped a woman's son, replacing him with an aged changeling. On the advice of her neighbor, she put half a dozen eggshells filled with water to boil in front of the fire. The changeling exclaimed, and the mother asked him where her son had gone. He replied that the Jetins had taken him to them "to have some of the breed". She took the changeling to the edge of the Jetins' hole, and threatened to kill him if she didn't get her son back, which she did. Like other changeling legends, this one involves "life and death blackmail" to get the real baby back, and an opposition between the chubby, young child of the men and the puny, 90-year-old child of the lutins. This story lends credence to the tendency of fairies and lutins to steal human babies on the grounds of beauty, to ensure the longevity of their own "race" and protect it from degeneration.

== Popular culture ==
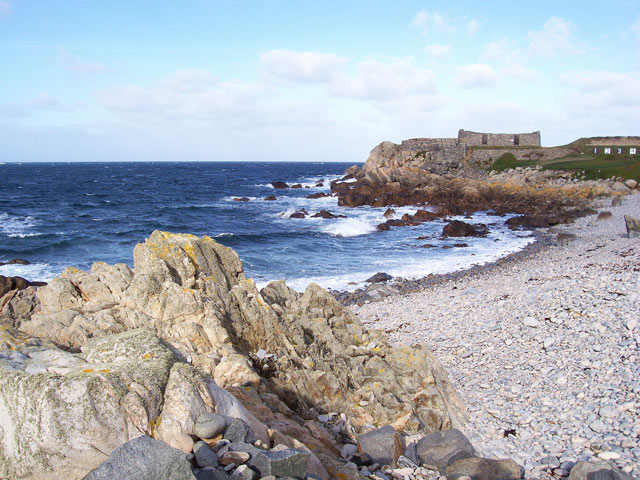
The island of Guernsey (here, at Fort Le Marchant) is said to be inhabited by Jetins.

As with many other lutins, Pierre Dubois writes about the Jetins in La Grande Encyclopédie des lutins. He attributes to them a half-foot height, a rustic dress, a hairy cap and silver clogs, adding that when the houles fairies left Brittany to reach England, it was the Jetins who definitively blocked "the entrance to the Teignouse Narrows which led to their former palace", thanks to their great strength, comparable to that of giants.

== See also ==
- Fions
- Houles fairy

== Bibliography ==
- Dubois, Pierre (1992). "Fions, Jetins et Fois". In Hoëbeke (ed.). La Grande Encyclopédie des lutins (in French). Illustrated by Roland Sabatier and Claudine Sabatier. ISBN 978-2-84230-325-9.
- Ely, Richard; Tsaag Valren, Amélie (October 25, 2013). "Jetins". In éditions Terre de Brume (ed.). Bestiaire fantastique & créatures féeriques de France (in French). ISBN 2843625084.
- Morvan, Françoise (2 September 2005). Vie et mœurs des lutins bretons. Babel (in French). Arles/Montréal: Actes Sud. ISBN 2-7427-5793-7.
- Ruaud, André-François (2010). "Jetins". In Les moutons électriques (ed.). Le Dico féérique: Le Règne humanoïde (in French). Vol. 1. ISBN 2361830302.
- Sébillot, Paul (1997). Le folklore de la mer (in French). Saint-Malo: Ancre de Marine Éditions. ISBN 2-84141-115-X.
- Sébillot, Paul (August 2002) [1904]. Croyances, mythes et légendes des pays de France (in French). Paris: Omnibus. ISBN 2-258-05989-5.
