= Korred =

Korred may refer to:

- Korrigan, a fairy or dwarf in Breton folklore
- Korred (Dungeons & Dragons), a Fey in Dungeons & Dragons
