= Denez Prigent discography =

This is a list of albums released by Breton folk singer Denez Prigent.

== Ar gouriz koar ==
Prigent's first album, Ar gouriz koar (translated The Wax Belt), was released in 1993 on Auvidis/Silex. A second version of the album was recorded and released in 1996 on Barclay Records after a lawsuit between Prigent and Auvidis/Silex over the proceeds from the album sales. The title comes from the song "Ur vag a Vontroulez", in which a woman pledges a gift of wax to Saint John if he saves her son from the wretch. This is allusion to a recurring element found in the Barzaz Breiz, in which a length of wax (or belt) circling a land three times appears several times as the reward that one promises if a particularly important favour is granted.

=== Track listing ===
All songs are traditional, except where noted.

Original release (1993)

1. "Iwan Gamus"
2. "Plac’h Landelo" (Bernez Tangi)
3. "Diwar va skaoñv"
4. "Ar verjelen"
5. "Gwerz an aksidan" (Prigent)
6. "Dañs"
7. "Ti Eliz Iza"
8. "Eur vag neves a Vountroules"
9. "Gwerz Penmarc’h"
10. "Gwerz ar vezhinerien" (Denez Abernot)
11. "Deuit Ganin"
12. "Son Marivonig"

Re-release (1996)

1. "Plac’h Landelo" (Tangi)
2. "Diwar va skaoñv"
3. "Gwerz ar vezhinerien" (Abernot)
4. "Tio, tio" (Germain Horellou)
5. "Dañs"
6. "Ar verjelenn"
7. "Ar bugel koar"
8. "Ar goulenn"
9. "Iwan Gamus"
10. "Ur vag a Vontroulez"
11. "Biskoazh kement all !"
12. "Gwerz an aksidan" (Prigent)
13. "P'edon war bont an Naoned"
14. "Ti Eliz Iza"

== Me 'zalc'h ennon ur fulenn aour ==
=== Track listing ===
All songs written by Denez Prigent, except where noted.

1. "An droug-red" (music trad.: "Jenovefa Rustefan")
2. "An heuntoù adkavet" (music trad.)
3. "Copsa Mica (Part 1)" (music trad.: "Paotred Plouillo")
4. "Copsa Mica (Part 2)" (music trad.)
5. "Brall ar rodoù"
6. "E trouz ar gêr"
7. "Ur fulenn aour"
8. "Kereñvor" (music trad.)
9. "An iliz ruz"
10. "Al lagad foll" (music trad.)
11. "Ar wezenn-dar" (music trad.)
12. "Ar rannoù" (lyric trad.)

Bonus CD

1. "Ar rannoù" (single version) (Traditional)
2. "Ar wezenn-dar"
3. "An hentoù adkavet"
4. "E trouz ar gêr"

== Irvi ==
=== Track listing ===
All songs written by Denez Prigent, except where noted.

1. "Gortoz a ran" (feat. Lisa Gerrard)
2. "Ar mab-laer"
3. "Melezourioù-glav" (music trad.)
4. "Evit netra"
5. "Hent-eon"
6. "A-dreñv va zi"
7. "Daouzek huñvre" (feat. Bertrand Cantat) (music Prigent & trad.)
8. "Ar chas ruz"
9. "Ar warizi"
10. "Yann Chaseour"
11. "Gortoz a ran" (Elegia remix)

Bonus CD

1. "Ar sonerien du"
2. "E trouz ar gêr" (Live remix)
3. "E ti Eliz Iza" (Traditional)
4. "Yann Chaseour Heart of Black Hole" (The Orb remix)

== Live Holl a-gevret ! ==
=== Track listing ===
1. "Fin'amors de flamenca"
2. "An droug-red"
3. "An heuntoù adkavet"
4. "Brall ar rodoù"
5. "Evit netra"
6. "Ar chas ruz"
7. "Melezourioù-glav"
8. "Ar sonerien du"
9. "Copsa Mica"
10. "E trouz ar gêr"
11. "E ti Eliz Iza"
12. "Ar mab-laer"
13. "Gortoz a ran" (bonus track)

== Sarac'h ==
=== Track listing ===
All songs written by Denez Prigent, except where noted.

1. "An hini a garan" (feat. Lisa Gerrard) (Traditional)
2. "E garnison !" (feat. Louise Ebrel) (Traditional)
3. "Sarac'h"
4. "Geotenn ar marv"
5. "N'eus forzh..."
6. "Dispi"
7. "Son Alma Ata"
8. "Gwerz Kiev"
9. "Ar gwez-sapin"
10. "Ar vamm lazherez"

== An enchanting garden: Ul liorzh vurzudhus ==
=== Track listing ===
1. Kredin 'raen - I Believed (5: 10)
2. Beaoet 'm eus - l Travelled (4:24)
3. An teodoù fall - Gossip (2:57)
4. An tri amourouz - Three Lovers (7: 10)
5. An Old Story (3:30)
6. Peñse nedeleg - A Ship wreck on Christmas Day (3:31)
7. Eostig kerchagrin - The Nightingale of Kerchagrin (3:53)
8. An trucher hag an ankoù - The Cheater and the death (3:42)
9. An tri seblant - The Three messages of death (10:30)
10. Gwechall gozh - Once Upon a time... (5:37)
11. Ar binioù skornet - The Frosty bagpipe (4:48)
12. Before Dawn (3:48)

== In unison with the stars: A-unvan gant ar stered ==
=== Track listing ===
1. An teodoù fall
2. Beajet'm eus
3. Eostig Kerchagrin
4. An hini a garan (acoustic)
5. Krediñ 'raen
6. An tri amourouz
7. Gwerz Kiev (acoustic)
8. Ar binioù skornet
9. An tri seblant
10. Gortoz a ran (acoustic)
11. E ti Eliz Iza

== Mil hent - Mille chemins ==
=== Track listing ===
1. Ar groazig aour
2. An hentoù splann
3. Va hent (feat. Yann Tiersen)
4. Ar rodoù avel
5. Dans la rivière courante
6. Marc'h-Eon
7. Al labous marzhus
8. Hent noazh (feat. Yann Tiersen)
9. An tad-moualc'h kaner
10. Ar marv gwenn
11. The Labyrinth of Life
12. It da lavaret 'n he huñvre
13. Nij an erer
