= Franco-Celtic =

Franco-Celtic can refer to:

- Brittany
  - Culture of Brittany
  - Breton mythology
- the Matter of Britain in medieval French literature
- (claims of) Gaulish remnants in French culture

== See also ==
- Modern Celts
