= Breton mythology =

Breton mythology is the mythology or corpus of explanatory and heroic tales originating in Brittany. The Bretons are the descendants of insular Britons who settled in Brittany from at least the third century. While the Britons were already Christianised in this era, the migrant population maintained an ancient Celtic mythos, similar to those of Wales and Cornwall.

Breton mythology has many gods and mythical creatures specifically associated with nature cults. In this tradition of gods and creatures rooted in nature, there exist traces of certain Breton Catholic saints.

- Ankou
- Bugul Noz
- Conan Meriadoc
- Fions
- Iannic-ann-ôd
- Jetins
- Korrigan
- Cannard Noz
- March Malaen
- Morgens
- Morvan, legendary chief of the Viscounty of Léon
- Morvarc'h
- Tadig Kozh (Placide Guillermic)
- Tréo-Fall
- Ys

== Folklore ==
- Fest noz
- Tro Breizh
