= Ar rannoù =

Score of the "series", as presented in Barzaz Breiz

"Ar rannoù" ("The Series", published as "The Series, or the Druid and the Child"), also known as "Gousperoù ar raned" ("The Frogs' Vespers"), is a traditional Breton folksong, composed in twelve parts or "series".

== Origin and significance of the song ==
The real origin of the song remains unknown.

Théodore Hersart de La Villemarqué collected this song in Cornouaille, Brittany, and published it in Barzaz Breiz, making it the opening piece of his work. For him the origin of the song stretches back to the time of the Druids and is a testimony of the past, treating of Breton mythology, the composition of the world, life and battles.

For others, including François-Marie Luzel who collected around twenty different versions in Cornouaille and Trégor (Gousperoù ar raned), it is only a rimadell, intended to exercise the memory. Luzel rejected La Villemarqué's version, which he declared erroneous because overinterpreted as to the mythological aspect. Some variants collected by Luzel have elements very close to the version of de La Villemarqué, which could simply be a testimony to the popularity of these songs.

In both cases, the real meaning of the lyrics remains surrounded by a certain mystery, the people from whom these songs are collected themselves admitting their ignorance of the real meaning of the lyrics.

== Manner of singing ==
The song is a dialogue between a child and a teacher (a druid for de La Villemarqué). The teacher asks the child what he wants to know, at which the child asks him for the first strophe (a "series" for de La Villemarqué). The teacher sings the first strophe, then again asks the question. The child then asks for the second strophe. The teacher sings the second strophe and repeats the first one. Then the child asks for the third strophe, and so on. The song carries on with these repetitions of the previous stanzas already sung, until the twelfth stanza is sung.

== Comparison of the translated lyrics ==
Strophe	Théodore Hersart de La Villemarqué – "Ar rannoù"	François-Marie Luzel – "Gousperoù ar raned"
1	No series for number one: the single Need; Death, father of pain; nothing before, nothing more.	A silver ring to Mary
2	Two oxen harnessed to a shell; if they pull, they will die; behold a miracle!	Two silver rings to Mary
3	There are three parts to the world: three beginnings and three ends, for man and for the oak too. Three kingdoms of Merzin (Merlin); golden fruits, bright flowers, little laughing children.	Three queens in a palace, Possessing the three sons of Henri, Playing, humming (singing), Each with her silver ring
4	There are four whetstones: Merlin's whetstones, which sharpen swift swords.	Four acolytes Singing the Exaudi
5	There are five zones around the earth: five ages in the span of time; a dolmen on our sister.	Five very black cows, Crossing a peat-bog
6	There are six little children of wax, quickened by the energy of the moon; if you don't know it, I know it. There are six medicinal plants in the small cauldron; the little dwarf mixes the drink, little finger in mouth.	Six brothers and six sisters
7	There are seven suns and seven moons, seven planets with the hen Seven elements with the flour of the air (atoms).	Seven days and seven months
8	There are eight winds blowing; eight fires with the fire of the father, lit in the month of May on the mountain of war. Eight heifers of the dazzling whiteness of sea foam, grazing the grass of the deep island; eight white heifers belonging to the Lady.	Eight little threshers on the barn-floor Threshing peas, threshing pods
9	There are nine little white hands on the threshing-floor table near Lezarmeur's tower, and nine mothers who groan aloud. Nine korrigans who by the light of the full moon dance around the spring, in clothes of white wool and with flowers in their hair. There are the boar-sow and her nine piglets at the door of the château, their lair, growling and burrowing, burrowing and growling. Babies! Babies! Babies! Hurry back to the apple-tree! The old boar will give you a lesson.	Nine sons in arms returning from Nantes; Their broken swords Their bloody shirts The most terrible son who holds his head high Is frightened to see them
10	Ten enemy ships have been seen coming from Nantes. Woe to you, woe to them, men of Vannes!	Ten ships on the shores Loaded with linen, with sheets
11	Eleven armed belek coming from Vannes, with their swords shattered; and their robes bloodied; and their hazel-wood crutches; of three hundred of them only eleven are left.	Grunting, growling Eleven sows, eleven pigs
12	There are twelve months and twelve signs; the last but one, Sagittarius, shoots his arrow armed with a sting. The twelve signs are at war. The beautiful cow, the black cow with the white star on her brow, comes out of the forest of spoils; In her breast is the sting of the arrow; her blood is flowing; she bellows, head raised; The trumpet sounds: fire and thunder; rain and wind; thunder and fire; nothing; nothing; nothing, no series!	Twelve pretty little swords Angrily cutting up your gable As fine as bran.
