= Tadig Kozh (Placide Guillermic) =

Catholic priest and canon mythologized by Breton beliefs

Tadig Kozh Placide Guillermic
- Born: Placide Marie Guillermic; 5 January 1788; Plounez (Côtes-d'Armor, France)
- Died: 28 April 1873 (aged 85); Bégard (Côtes-d'Armor, France)
- Occupation: Parish Priest in charge of the pastoral care of Bégard

Abbot Placide Guillermic, nicknamed Tadig Kozh (born 5 January 1788 in Plounez; died 28 April 1873 in Bégard) was a Catholic priest and canon mythologized by Breton beliefs. Little biographical information is known about him, but eyewitness accounts mention the exorcisms this rector of Bégard performed at Méné-Bré in the Saint-Hervé chapel. Anatole Le Braz recounts that Tadig Kozh possessed knowledge of life and death, as well as supernatural powers, enabling him to reincarnate indefinitely, and to command demons and the wind. According to Claude Sterckx, Tadig Kozh is one of the few characters from Breton folklore who can be directly linked to themes from Celtic mythology, in particular Merlin.

== Etymology ==
In Breton, Tadig Kozh (Note: In older works, we sometimes find Tadig Koz or Tadic Coz (spellings of the time).) means "old dad", a term of endearment for the elderly. According to Anatole Le Braz's collection, this name was given to the abbot because he used to address his parishioners by saying "Contet d'in ho stad, va bugel. Me eo ho tad, ho tadic-coz!" (in Breton), or "Tell me about your state, my child. I'm your father, your old dad!". The nickname stuck.

== Biography ==
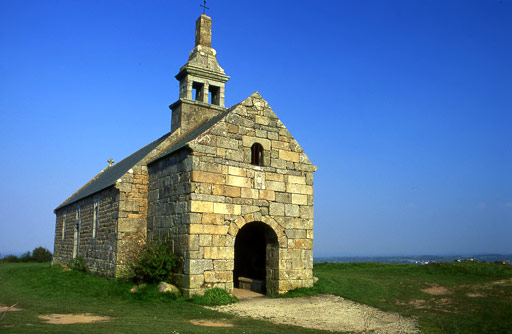
Saint-Hervé chapel, where Tadig Kozh used to perform exorcisms

According to the vital record, Placide Marie Guillermic was born in Plounez on 5 January 1788 to Jean Guillermic and Françoise Le Calvez. (Note: A source in Annales de Bretagne claims that he was 92 years old in 1869, which would make him born eleven years earlier, in 1777. But this information appears to be false. See Ollivier, J. (1941). Rennes University. Faculté des lettres et sciences humaines (ed.). "Catalogue bibliographique de la chanson populaire bretonne sur feuilles volantes (suite)". Annales de Bretagne (in French). 48: 145. . The birth in 1788 was confirmed by Daniel Giraudon (see: Giraudon, Daniel (2007). Traditions populaires de Bretagne: du soleil aux étoiles (in French). Spézet: Coop Breizh. p. 235. ISBN 978-2-84346-336-5.).)

An account was collected in 1886 in Penvénan, from a certain Baptiste Geffroy, who described him as "an old priest from the past". Gwenc'hlan Le Scouëzec and Dominique Besançon point out that many people of the time have fond memories of this abbot, reputed to be a "great thaumaturge". According to the Côtes-du-Nord departmental archives, he was rector of Bégard from 1838 to 1873. In the mid-19th century, Tadig Kozh, under the official name of "Monsieur Guillermic", performed impressive exorcism sessions at the summit of Menez Bré in the Saint-Hervé chapel, during which he "climbed barefoot to the summit on full-moon nights, ordering the demons to parade before him", before "sending them back to hell with a spray of holy water". This is known as the Ann ofern drantel, or midnight mass. The abbot seems to have been a specialist in these exorcism sessions. He died on 28 April 1873, aged 85.

== Legend ==
During his lifetime, Tadig Kozh undoubtedly embodied the ideal exorcist priest, a person very close to his parishioners. Popular imagination transformed him into a character endowed with supernatural powers: he was said to be able to tame ghosts, lock up evil souls in the body of an animal and save those of the dead. Around 1880, the rector of Plounez wrote that Yves (sic) Placide Marie Guillermic went blind at an early age, but was cured by a miracle. Another legend has it that Placide Guillermic, together with the Lannion priest Cloarec Prat, and a third person "as intelligent as the two of them", were able to stop the wind from blowing.

His canonical age is the source of another part of his legend, as Baptiste Geffroy states that Tadig Kozh "had only been known as an old man", ten times dead and ten times resurrected, because God had entrusted this priest with "as many powers as the Pope". He was said to have possessed the secrets of life and death, conversing with the devils of hell by sticking his head through the window well. During a personal investigation, Daniel Giraudon heard the account of a woman born in Tréglamus in 1897, who claimed that Tadig Kozh had recognized a devil in a deceased person, which led to a lawsuit by the family of the deceased. During this trial, Tadig Kozh enumerated the devils, provoking the arrival of a swarm of crows, which he interrogated by giving each of them a flax seed.

Tadig Kozh was thus seen as an omniscient figure with mastery and knowledge of the elements and reincarnations, like Merlin and the Irish druid Fintan. (Note: A Breton tradition collected by François-Marie Luzel has it that Merlin ended his life on the summit of Menez Bré, see Marquand, Patrice (2006). "Merlin, de la tradition brittonique médiévale à la littérature orale de Basse-Bretagne" (PDF). Session de formation de la Société de Mythologie Française (in French)..) As such, although he was originally a real person, he can be linked to Celtic mythology.

== Bibliography ==
- Le Braz, Anatole (1893). La Légende de la mort en Basse-Bretagne (in French). Paris: Honoré Champion.
- Stéphan, Alain (1996). Tous les prénoms bretons (in French). Paris: Editions Jean-paul Gisserot. p. 49. ISBN 2-87747-172-1.
- Sterckx, Claude (1994). "De Fionntan au Tadig Kozh : figures mythiques d'Irlande et de Bretagne". Irlande et Bretagne : vingt siècles d'histoire : actes du colloque de Rennes (29-31 mars 1993) (in French). Terre de Brume.
- Sterckx, Claude (2014). Mythologie du monde celte (in French). Marabout. ISBN 978-2-501-09717-8.
