= Lutin =

French folkloric hobgoblin

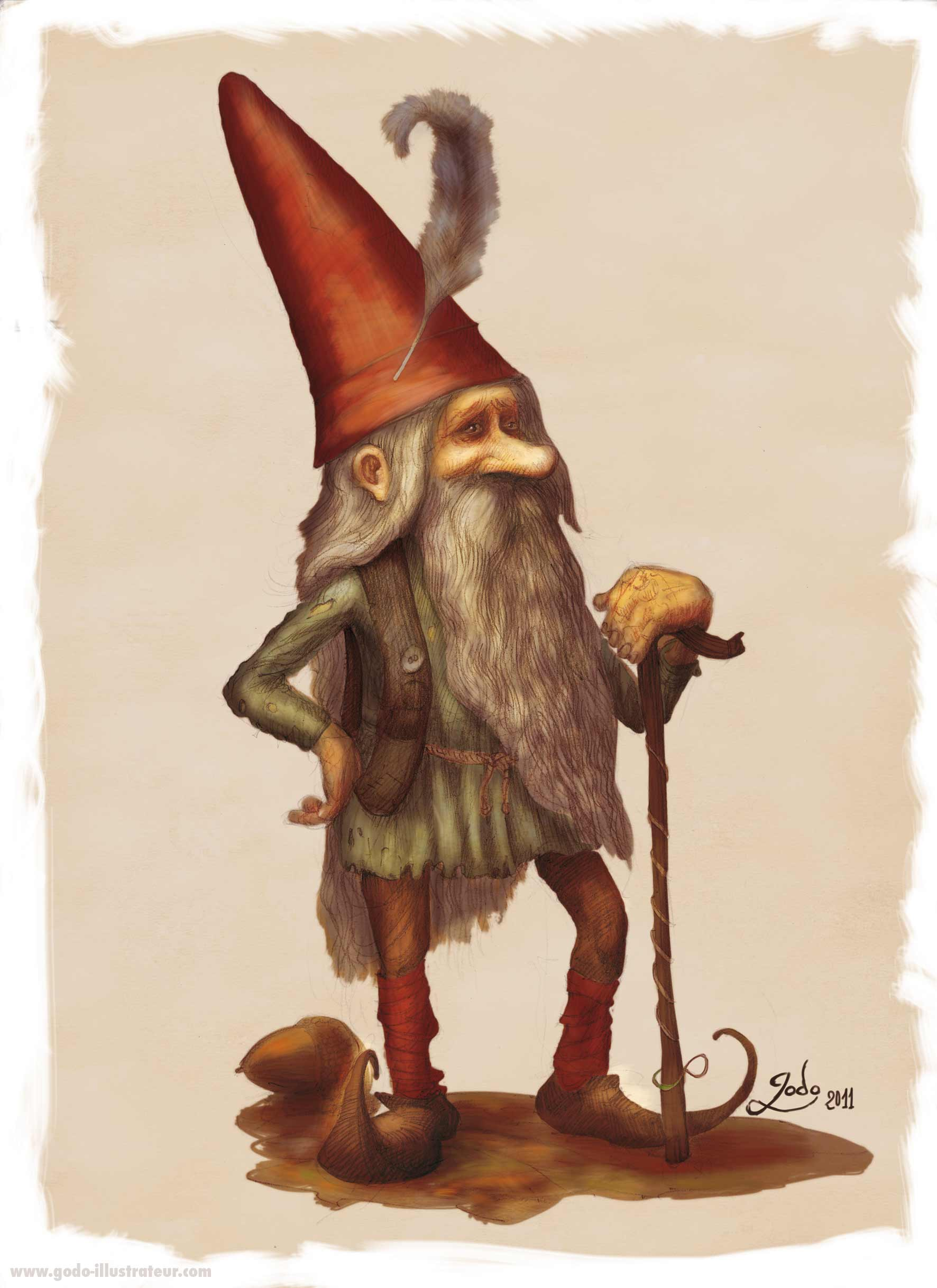
A lutin.

A lutin (French pronunciation: [lytɛ̃]) is a type of hobgoblin (an amusing goblin) in French folklore and fairy tales. Female lutins are called lutines (French pronunciation: [lytin]).

A lutin (varieties include the Nain Rouge or "red dwarf") plays a similar role in the folklore of Normandy to household spirits in England, Germany and Scandinavia. Lutin is generally translated into English as: brownie, elf, fairy, gnome, goblin, hobgoblin, imp, leprechaun, pixie, puck, jetin or sprite. It sometimes takes the form of a horse saddled ready to ride, and in this shape is called Le Cheval Bayard. Lutins sometimes tangle people's or horses' hair into elf-locks.

A French fairy tale, "Le Prince Lutin", written in 1697 by Marie Catherine d'Aulnoy has a description of the "air, water and terrestrial lutin": "You are invisible when you like it; you cross in one moment the vast space of the universe; you rise without having wings; you go through the ground without dying; you penetrate the abysses of the sea without drowning; you enter everywhere, though the windows and the doors are closed; and, when you decide to, you can let yourself be seen in your natural form." In this story a red hat with two feathers makes the lutin invisible.

Lutins also assist Père Noël in Lapland.

== Name and etymology ==
The name is attested as netun c. 1176–1181 by Chrétien de Troyes in Yvain, the Knight of the Lion, as nuiton by Benoît de Sainte-Maure in Troie, and as luitun c. 1176–1181 by Wace in the Roman de Rou. It originally designated a sea monster. The meaning "a kind of demon, more mischievous than evil, who comes to torment people" appeared in the second quarter of the 14th century as luitin in Le Chevalier de La Tour Landry.

It comes from Latin Neptunus, the name of the Roman god of the seas, which came to also designate a pagan god in Late Latin. The transition from netum to nuiton was probably influenced by Old French nuit 'night', and the form luitun ~ luiton by Old French luitier (modern lutter 'to fight').

== Lutins in Quebec ==
Belief in lutins also spread to North America, particularly the Canadian province of Quebec, as spirits in the form of either pets (such as dogs or rabbits) or other common animals. Completely white cats are especially considered likely to be lutins, although seemingly any distinctive animal that lives in or near the home may be regarded as such. These lutins may be good or evil, with good lutins being attributed powers ranging from control of the weather, to shaving the beard of the master of the house before he woke on Sundays. Evil or offended lutins may harass the house-owner with any number of minor troubles, such as blunting a scythe or filling shoes with pebbles. Salt is considered abhorrent to them, and they are thought to go out of their way to avoid crossing it when spilled on the ground.

== Lutins in Detroit ==
The Nain Rouge appearance is said to presage terrible events for the city. The Nain Rouge appears as a small childlike creature with red or black fur boots. It is also said to have "blazing red eyes and rotten teeth."

== Lutins in Newfoundland ==
French-Newfoundland culture also mentions the lutin, particularly in connection with causing fairy-locks.

== See also ==
- Brownie (England and Scotland)
- Christmas elf
- Cofgodas (England)
- Domovoi (Russia)
- Elf
- Gnome
- Goblin
- Hob (England)
- Hobgoblin
- Houle (geomorphology)
- Imp
- Jetins (Brittany)
- Kobold (Germany)
- Kofewalt (Germany)
- Leprechaun (Ireland)
- Nisse, Tomte, Tonttu (Nordic countries)
- Shellycoat (England)
- Sprite (creature)
- Tréo-Fall (Brittany)
- Wight

== Sources ==
- The Fairy Mythology (France) by Thomas Knightly (1870)
