= Iannic-ann-ôd =

Celtic folklore

In Breton folklore, Iannic-ann-ôd or Yannig an Aod (Breton: [ˈjãniɡ ən ˈoːt]; meaning "Little John of the shore"), are said to be the lost souls of those drowned at sea and were never recovered. They are said to be heard along coastlines at night crying, "Iou! Iou!".

From The Celtic Legend of the Beyond:

Iannic-ann-ôd is not evil, provided one does not amuse oneself by sending his plaintive call back to him. Woe to the imprudent who risk this game. If you reply once, Iannic-ann-ôd leaps half the distance separating him from you, in a single bound; if you reply a second time, he leaps half of the remaining distance; if you reply a third time, he breaks your neck.

== See also ==
- La Llorona
- Melusine
