= Tréo-Fall =

Creatures from the folklore of Lower Brittany

- Sub grouping: Lutin
- Similar entities: Korrigan
- Folklore: Breton mythology
- First attested: François-Marie Luzel in March, 1873
- Region: Ushant et Plouaret, Brittany
- Habitat: Cliffs

The Tréo-Fall, also known as danserien-noz, are lutin-like creatures from the folklore of Lower Brittany. Under this first name, they are specific to the island of Ushant, where traditions about them were collected by François-Marie Luzel.

The Tréo-Fall are said to gather at the top of cliffs to dance in the moonlight, promising treasures to humans who cross their path. Two tales about "night dancers" were collected in Plouaret in January 1869. These goblins reward humans who join in their dance, and punish those who insult them.

== Etymology and terminology ==
The name "Tréo-Fall" is found only on the island of Ouessant. François-Marie Luzel and Françoise Morvan see the Tréo-Fall as a particular variety of Korrigans, linked to a local use of the knife on the island of Ouessant. The more widespread name danserien-noz (original version, or dañserion-noz in unified Breton) means "night dancer" in Breton. According to Divi Kervella, it's a nickname given to the Korrigans, rather than the name of a specific creature. It's commonly used in Finistère. The name "danseur de nuit" (night dancer) is also used to designate the dancing goblins of Plouaret, in the Côtes-d'Armor region.

== Description ==
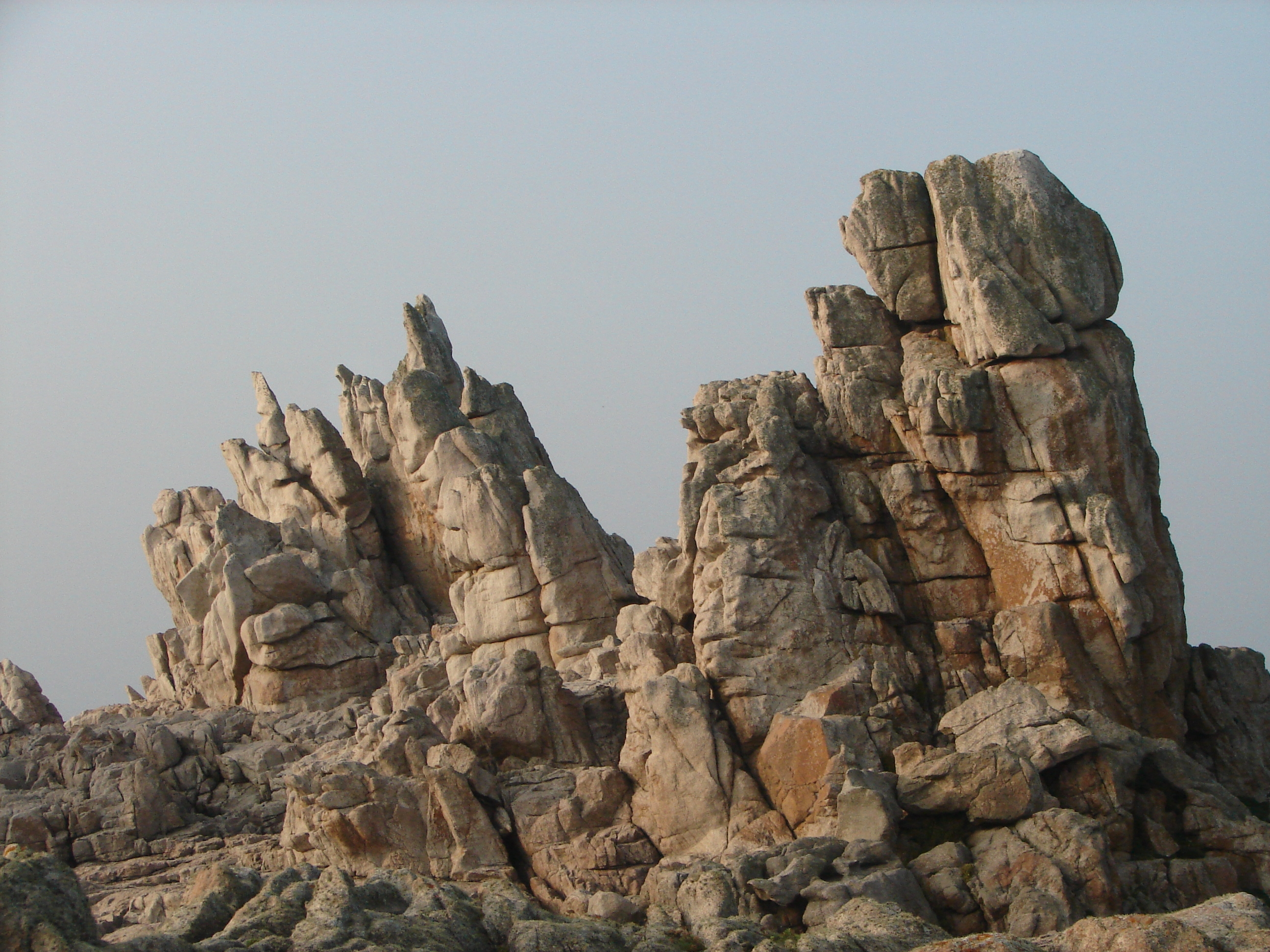
The rocks of Ushant Island, the territory of the Tréo-Fall, according to legend.

The Tréo-Fall gather at night in the moonlight on the cliffs of the Ushant island, to dance. According to Paul Sébillot, the descriptions are vague, but emphasize their small size. They invite humans to join in their dance, promising them treasures. However, this is a trap, as these unfortunate dancers often end up with broken kidneys. The only way to escape is to stick a knife in the ground, then graze it at each dance circle. If the dancer succeeds in fulfilling this condition, the Tréo-Fall will grant his or her request, whatever it may be. According to Paul-Yves Sébillot, they wear round hats and dance around a copper basin.

== Collections ==
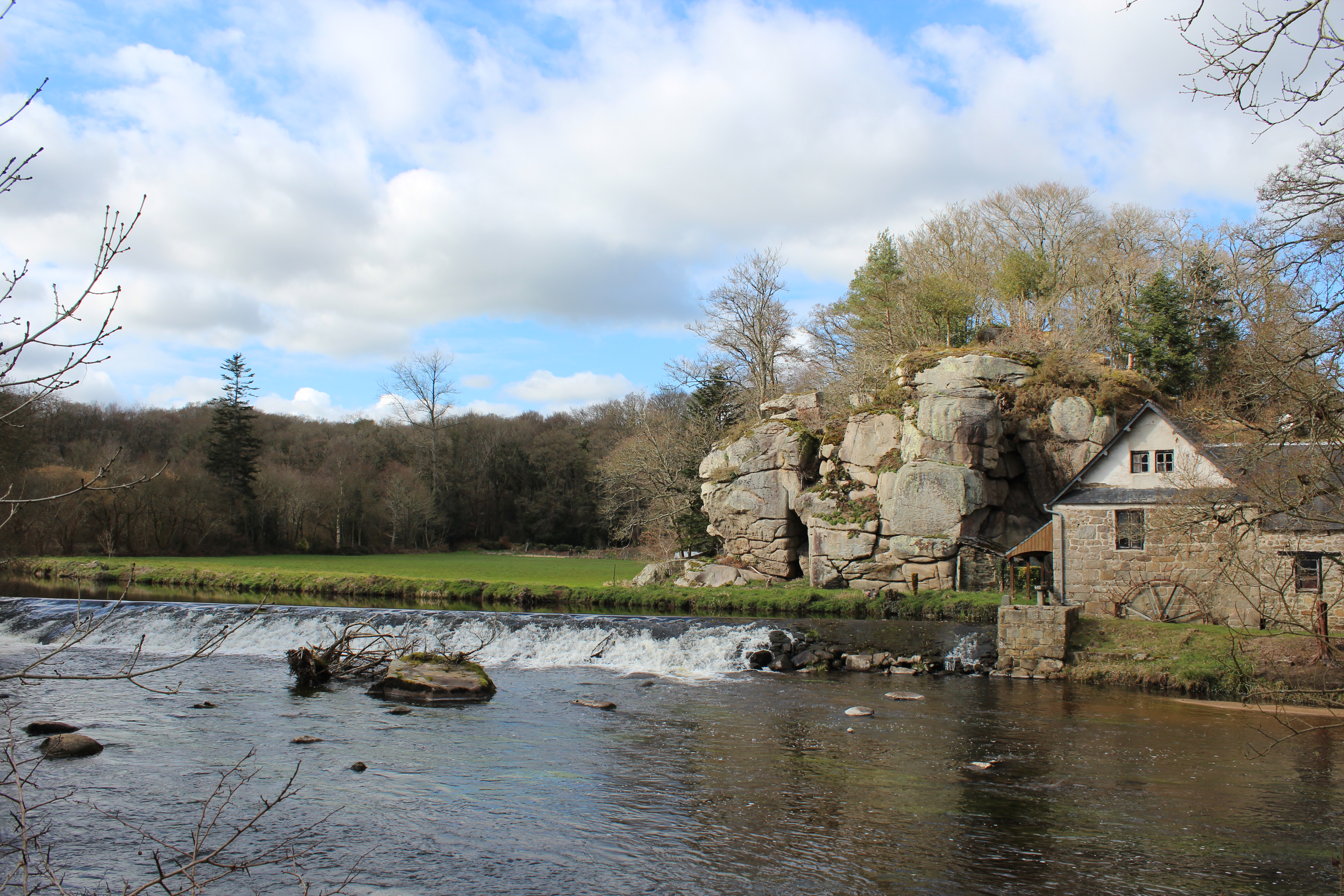
The two tales collected in the Côtes d'Armor region come from Plouaret (here, the Losser mill).

The first known mention of the Tréo-Fall comes from the travel notes of François-Marie Luzel, in March 1873. He collected his information from the Ushant Island Justice of the Peace, who revealed to him the belief in these evil goblins. Luzel published this information several times. He also collected two versions of a tale about "night dancers" in Plouaret, in the western Côtes-d'Armor region. He published them in the third volume of his Contes populaires de Basse-Bretagne:

The night dancers and the woman transformed into a duck.
Original text in Breton, p. 103	English translation, p. 103.
Selaouit holl, mar hoc’h eus c’hoant, Setu aman eur gaozic koant, Ha na eus en-hi netra gaou, Mès, marteze, eur gir pe daou.	Listen, if you like, Here's a nice little tale, In which there is no lie, Except, perhaps, a word or two.

It features two half-sisters, one pretty, graceful and wise; the other ugly, ungainly and mean. At the Croaz-ann-neud crossroads between Guernaour and Plouaret, the Night Dancers could be seen. Anyone who happened to pass by while they were making their rounds in the moonlight, and didn't want to dance with them, fell victim to their evil tricks. The lady of Guernaour knowingly sent the pretty girl she hated down this road. At the Croaz-ann-neud crossroads, she saw a crowd of little men inviting her to dance, and accepted. They lavished her with gifts. The stepmother, seeing this, sent Margot the bad girl down the road. But when she saw the little men inviting her to dance, she insulted them, so they cursed her.

The second version is very similar, except that it mentions seven dwarfs in large hats (instead of a crowd): six dancing and one not. When the good girl agrees to dance with them, the six dwarfs who danced kiss her to thank her, and the seventh refrains.

== Popular culture ==
The fourth comic book in the Le Torte series, scripted by Pierre Dubois and drawn by Lucien Rollin, is entitled Tréo-Fall. It appeared in July 1992, and was reissued in January 1999.

== See also ==
- Korrigan
- Ushant

== Bibliography ==
- Ely, Richard; Tsaag Valren, Amélie (25 October 2013). Bestiaire fantastique & créatures féeriques de France (in French). Dinan: éditions Terre de Brume. ISBN 978-2-84362-508-4.
- Luzel, François-Marie (1887). Contes populaires de Basse-Bretagne (in French).
- Kervella, Divi (2001). Légendaire celtique (in French). Erwan Seure-Le Bihan. Coop Breizh. ISBN 978-2-84346-137-8.
- Morvan, Françoise (2 September 2005). Vie et mœurs des lutins bretons. Babel (in French). Arles/Montréal: Actes Sud. ISBN 2-7427-5793-7.
- Ruaud, André-François (2010). "Tréo-Fall". In Les moutons électriques (ed.). Le Dico féérique: Le Règne humanoïde (in French). Vol. 1. ISBN 2361830302.
