= Goblin =

Mythical creature

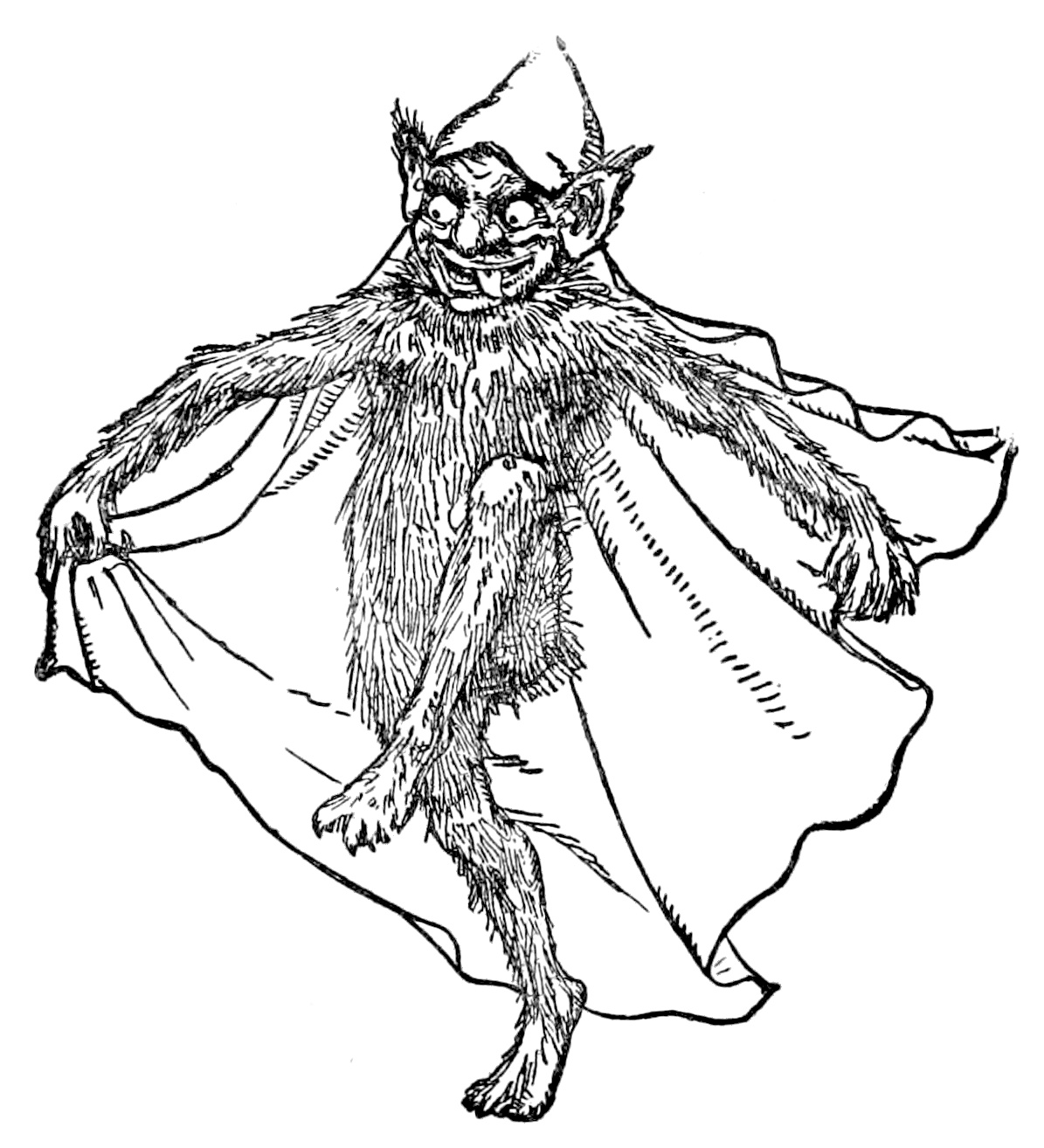
- Goblin illustration by John D. Batten from "English Fairy Tales" (19th century)

Creature information
- Grouping: Diminutive spirit
- Similar entities: Fairies, demons, brownies, dwarfs, elves, gnomes, imps, and kobolds.

A goblin is a diminutive, grotesque, and often malevolent humanoid creature prominent in European folklore, typically characterized by its mischievous or demonic nature, small stature (around 30 cm (12 in) in some traditions), furry or leathery appearance, and ability to shapeshift. They are often depicted with green skin. Goblins are believed to dwell in subterranean areas or households, where they engage in acts ranging from pranks to murder. Their etymology derives from Old French gobelin (late 12th century), possibly linked to Medieval Latin gobelinus or Greek kobalos (meaning rogue or sprite), though some scholars trace it to earlier domestic protector spirits like the Germanic kobold, which were later demonized under Christian influence.

Similar creatures include brownies, dwarves, duendes, gnomes, imps, leprechauns, and kobolds, but it is also commonly used as a blanket term for all small, fay creatures. The term is sometimes expanded to include goblin-like creatures of other cultures, such as the pukwudgie, dokkaebi, or ifrit.

== Etymology ==
The term "goblin" entered English in the early 14th century, derived from the Anglo-Norman French gobelin or Old French gobelin, which was first attested in 1195 in the chronicle L'Estoire de la guerre sainte by the Norman monk Ambroise, where it described a treacherous figure. This French form traces back to Medieval Latin gobelinus, appearing around 1140 in Orderic Vitalis's Historia ecclesiastica, referring to a demon expelled from a church in Évreux. Scholars propose possible etymological connections to earlier languages, including Ancient Greek kóbalos, meaning "rogue" or "mischievous sprite", which may have influenced post-classical Latin forms like cobalus denoting a demon. Additionally, links have been suggested to Germanic kobold, a household spirit, potentially from Old High German elements meaning "room protector", though the precise relationship remains uncertain. Alternatively, it may be a diminutive or other derivative of the French proper name Gobel, more often Gobeau.

Historical spellings of the term include gobelin (Old and Middle French), gobelinus (Medieval Latin), gobellin (Middle French, by 1506), and Middle English variants such as gobelyn around 1330. The adoption of "goblin" in early English literature was shaped by Norman folklore, where the term evoked domestic sprites or imps, as seen in Picard French goguelin for spirits haunting remote rooms, influencing its integration into medieval English texts like Wycliffe's Bible (late 14th century).

The Welsh coblyn, a type of knocker, derives from the Old French gobelin via the English goblin.

== In folklore ==
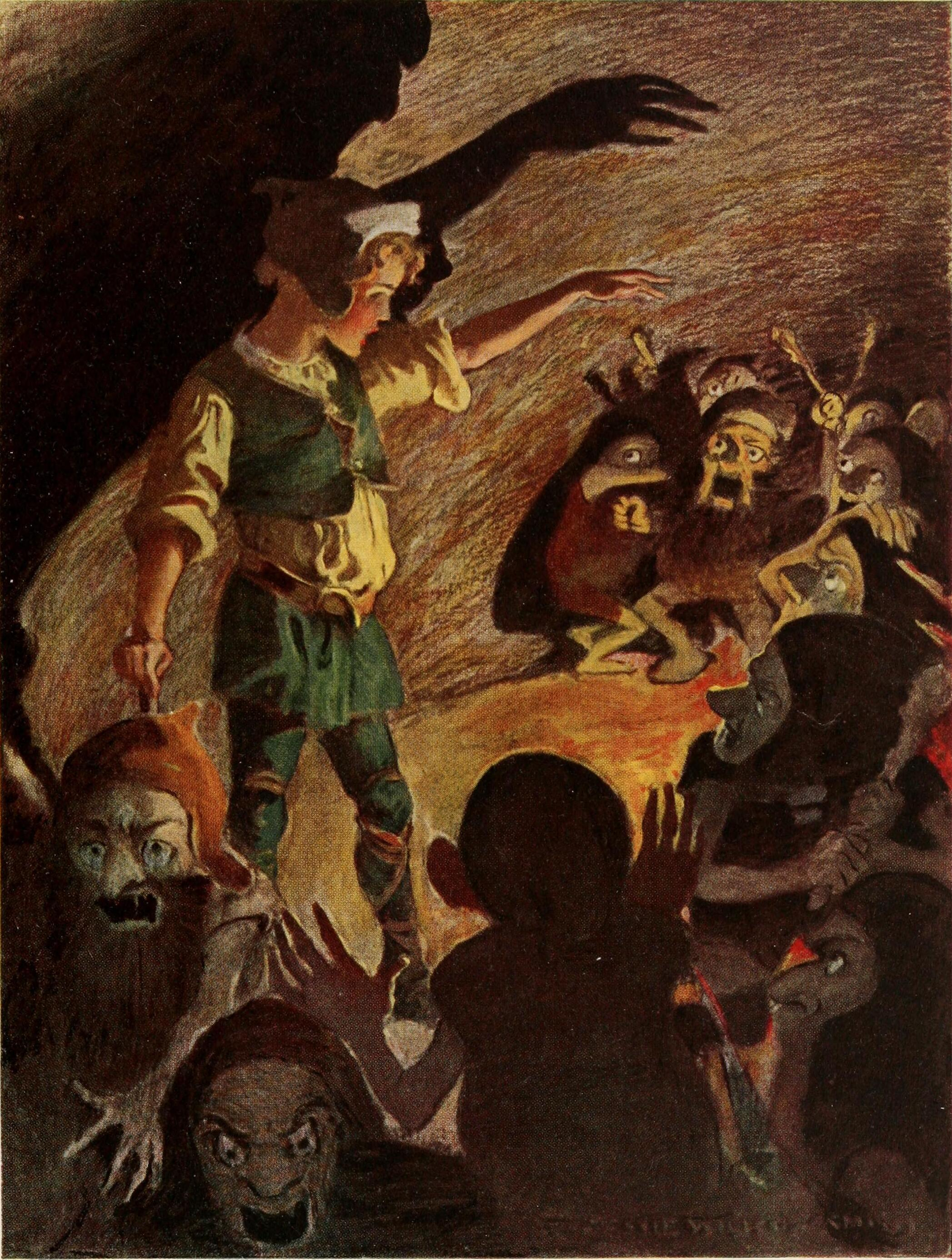
The Princess and the Goblin by George MacDonald, illustrated by Jessie Willcox Smith, 1920

=== European folklore ===
In English and Scottish folklore, goblins often appear as brownies, benevolent household spirits that perform domestic chores such as threshing grain, churning butter, or tending livestock during the night, provided they receive a small offering like porridge or milk left by the hearth. These creatures, typically depicted as small, shaggy-haired males dressed in ragged clothing, embody a symbiotic relationship with human households but are quick to abandon or turn mischievous if offered gifts of clothing or if their labor is criticized. In contrast, boggarts from Yorkshire traditions represent a more malevolent variant, functioning as vengeful familial spirits that attach to specific houses or farms, shapeshifting into animals or objects to perpetrate pranks, illness, or calamity upon those who slight them, often requiring rituals like relocation to appease their wrath.

Welsh folklore features the púca as a solitary trickster goblin, akin to a puckish sprite that misleads nighttime wanderers along paths or into bogs, sometimes assuming animal forms like a goat or horse to amplify the deception, though it may also assist those who show respect by leaving offerings. In Irish mythology, the clurichaun appears as a goblin-like fairy with an affinity for alcohol, haunting cellars and breweries where it pilfers liquor, rides barrels like horses, and unleashes drunken fury on distillers who disturb its revels.

French and Norman traditions portray lutins as impish goblins that frolic in stables, knotting horses' manes into fairy-locks for sport or covertly aiding with nighttime labors, their dual temperament shifting from playful to petty depending on human hospitality. The region of Évreux in northern France holds particular significance as a historical hub of goblin lore, where the 12th-century Orderic Vitalis describes the demon Gobelinus, a prototype for later goblin figures, haunting pagan sites and temples, expelled only through saintly intervention.

Prominent narratives in European goblin traditions include tales of fairy markets from folklore, where spectral merchants peddle illusory fruits and wares to ensnare the unwary, symbolizing temptation and otherworldly commerce in rural traditions, later popularized in literature such as Christina Rossetti's Goblin Market (1862). Redcap legends from Anglo-Scottish border lore depict these ferocious goblins as squat, iron-shod murderers dwelling in forsaken border towers, who slay wayfarers with their pikestaffs and soak their knitted caps in the spilled blood to maintain their vivid hue, fleeing only from consecrated objects or swift escapees.

=== Non-European equivalents ===
Korean folklore features the dokkaebi, horned tricksters animated from discarded household tools like brooms or rice bowls through spiritual possession, wielding magical clubs (bangmangi) to enforce games or punishments on humans. Unlike purely malevolent entities, dokkaebi often reward clever individuals with treasures after riddles or wrestling matches.

Among African cultures, the Zulu tokoloshe embodies an evil sprite summoned by sangomas to inflict misfortune, illness, or nocturnal terror, particularly on children whom it scratches or devours. This hairy, diminutive water spirit, capable of invisibility and shape-shifting, is warded off by elevating beds on bricks to exploit its short stature.

In Egyptian and broader Middle Eastern lore, certain jinn exhibit goblin-like prankster qualities, such as misplacing items, mimicking voices to deceive travelers, or creating illusory disturbances in homes. These shape-shifting spirits are invisible to humans unless they choose otherwise.

Indigenous American traditions include the Wampanoag pukwudgie, porcupine-quilled tricksters who wield poison arrows to mislead or injure humans in forested areas, originally benevolent guides turned vengeful after perceived slights by the Creator. These knee-high, gray-skinned beings use illusions to lure victims off paths.

== In fiction ==
=== Fairy tales and folk stories ===
- Christina Rossetti's narrative poem Goblin Market
- The Princess and the Goblin by George MacDonald
- "The Goblin Pony", from The Grey Fairy Book (French fairy tale)
- "The Benevolent Goblin", from Gesta Romanorum (England)
- "The Goblins at the Bath House" (Estonia), from A Book of Ghosts and Goblins (1969)
- "The Goblins Turned to Stone" (Dutch fairy tale)
- King Gobb (Moldovan Romani folktale)
- Goblins are featured in the Danish fairy tales The Elf Mound, The Goblin and the Grocer, and The Goblin and the Woman.
- Goblins are featured in the Norwegian folktale The Christmas Visitors at Kvame.
- Goblins are featured in the Swedish fairy tales The Four Big Trolls and Little Peter Pastureman and Dag and Daga and the Flying Troll of Sky Mountain where they live among trolls alongside sprites and gnomes.
- Goblins are featured in the French fairy tale called The Golden Branch.
- Chinese Ghouls and Goblins (England, 1928)
- "The Goblin of Adachigahara" (Japanese fairy tale)
- The Boy Who Drew Cats (Japanese fairy tale)
- Twenty-Two Goblins (Indian fairy tale)
- The Korean nursery song "Mountain Goblin (산도깨비)" tells of meeting a dokkaebi and running away to live.

=== Modern fiction ===
In J. R. R. Tolkien's The Hobbit the evil creatures living in the Misty Mountains are referred to as goblins. In The Lord of the Rings, the same creatures are primarily referred to as orcs where the goblin name was used for the lesser orcs.

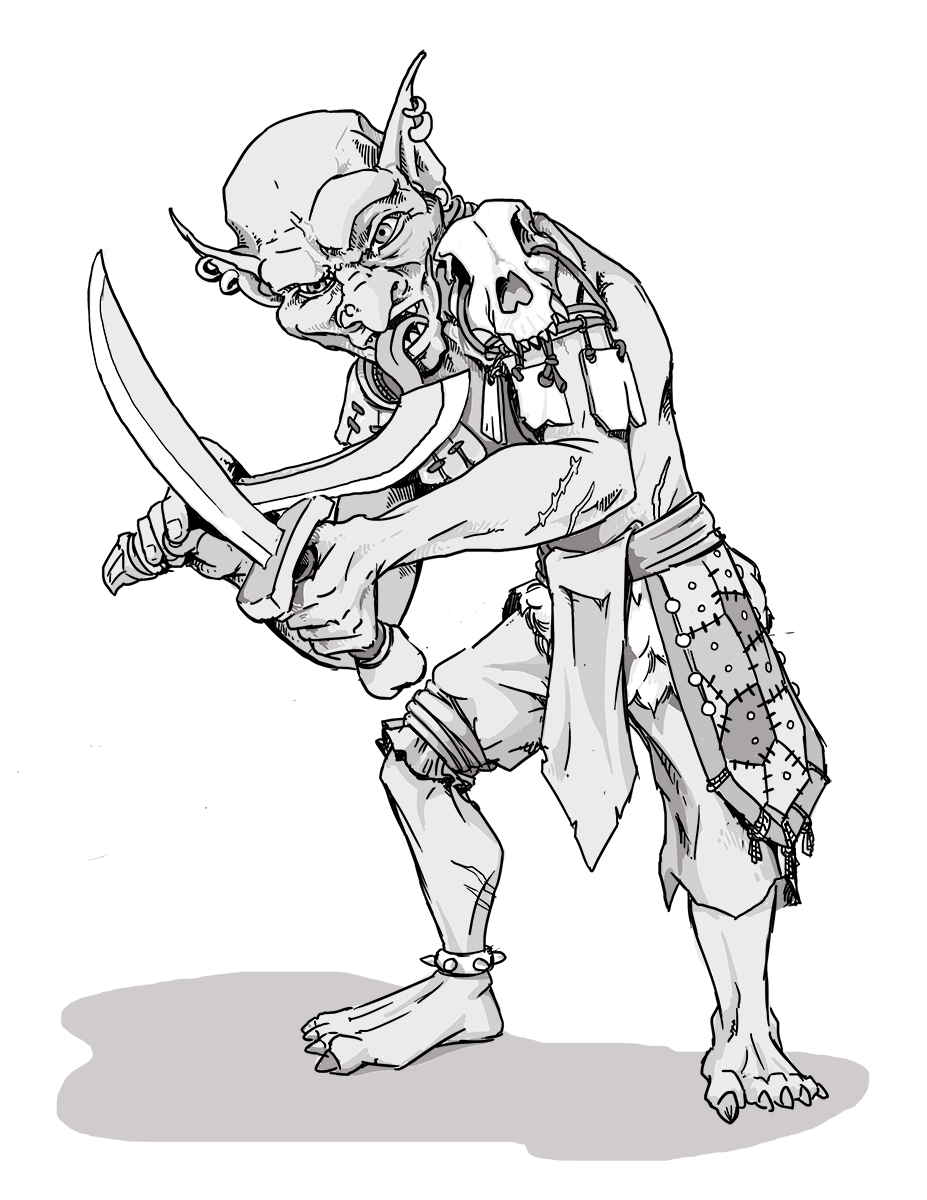
Representation of a goblin as it appears in the fantasy role-playing game Dungeons & Dragons

Goblinoids are a category of humanoid legendary creatures related to the goblin. The term was popularized in the Dungeons & Dragons fantasy role-playing game, in which goblins and related creatures are a staple of random encounters. Goblinoids are typically barbaric foes of the various human and "demi-human" races. Even though goblinoids in modern fantasy fiction are derived from J. R. R. Tolkien's orcs, the main types of goblinoids in Dungeons & Dragons are goblins, bugbears and hobgoblins; these creatures are also figures of mythology, next to ordinary goblins.

In the Harry Potter book series and the shared universe in which its film adaptations are set, goblins are depicted as strange, but civilised, humanoids who often serve as bankers or craftsmen.

In Terry Pratchett's Discworld series, goblins are initially a despised and shunned subterranean race; however, in later books, goblins are eventually integrated with the other races, and their mechanical and engineering talents come to be valued.

The Green Goblin is a well-known supervillain, one of the archenemies of Spider-Man, who has various abilities including enhanced stamina, durability, agility, reflexes and superhuman strength due to ingesting a substance known as the "Goblin Formula". He has appeared in various Spider-Man related media, such as comics, television series, video games, and films, including Spider-Man (2002) and Spider-Man: No Way Home (2021) as Norman Osborn, and Spider-Man 3 (2007) and The Amazing Spider-Man 2 (2014) as Harry Osborn. There have been other goblin-related characters like Hobgoblin, Grey Goblin, and Menace.

In the video game series Elder Scrolls, goblins are a hostile beast race said to originate from Summerset Isle, can range in size from being smaller than a Wood Elf to being larger than a Nord and love living in dank places such as caves and sewers.

In early English translations, The Smurfs were called goblins.

== Goblin-related place names ==
- 'The Gap of Goeblin', a hole and tunnel in Mortain, France.
- Hobroyd (which means 'goblin clearing'), High Peak, Derbyshire, UK.
- Goblin Combe, in north Somerset, UK
- Goblin Valley State Park, Utah, US
- Yester Castle (also known as "Goblin Hall") East Lothian, Scotland
- Goblin Bay, Beausoleil Island, Ontario, Canada
- Cowcaddens and Cowlairs, Glasgow, Scotland. 'Cow' is an old Scots word for Goblin, while 'cad' means 'nasty'. 'Dens' and 'lairs' refers to goblin homes.
- 541132 Leleākūhonua (then known as 2015 TG_{387}) is an object in the outer solar system nicknamed "The Goblin"

== See also ==
- Bugbear
- Dwarf (folklore)
- Elf
- Fairy
- Gnome
- Goblin (Dungeons and Dragons)
- Goblin mode
- Gremlin
- Hobgoblin
- Kobold
- Kumbhanda
- Lutin
- Orc
- Púca
- Troll

== Bibliography ==
- Briggs, K. M. (2003). The Anatomy of Puck. London: Routledge.
- Briggs, K. M. (1967). The Fairies in English Literature and Tradition. Chicago: Chicago University Press.
- Briggs, K. M. (1978). The Vanishing People. London: B.T. Batsford. ISBN 9780394502489.
- Carryl, Charles E. (1884). Davy And The Goblin. Boston: Houghton Mifflin.
- Dubois, Pierre (2005). The Complete Encyclopedia of Elves, Goblins, and Other Little Creatures. New York: Abbeville Press. ISBN 0-789-20878-4.
- Froud, Brian (1996). The Goblin Companion. Atlanta: Turner. ISBN 9781570362842.
- Froud, Brian (1983). Goblins!. New York: Macmillan.
- Hoad, T. F. (1993). English Etymology. Oxford University Press. ISBN 0192830988.
- Page, Michael and Robert Ingpen (1987). British Goblins: Encyclopedia of Things That Never Were. New York: Viking.
- Purkiss, Diane (2001). At the Bottom of the Garden. New York: New York University Press.
- Rose, Carol (1996). Spirits, Fairies, Gnomes and Goblins: an Encyclopedia of the Little People. Santa Barbara, Calif.: ABC-CLIO. ISBN 9780874368116.
- Sikes, Wirt (1973). British Goblins: Welsh Folk-lore, Fairy Mythology, Legends and Traditions. Wakefield: EP Pub.
- Silver, Carole G. (1999). Strange and Secret Peoples. Oxford: Oxford University Press. ISBN 978-0-19-512199-5.
- Zanger, Jules (1997). "Goblins, Morlocks, and Weasels". Children's Literature in Education. 8. Oxford: Oxford University Press: 154–162. doi:10.1007/BF01146190. S2CID 161822697.
