= Plélauff =

Plélauff Pellann
- Commune
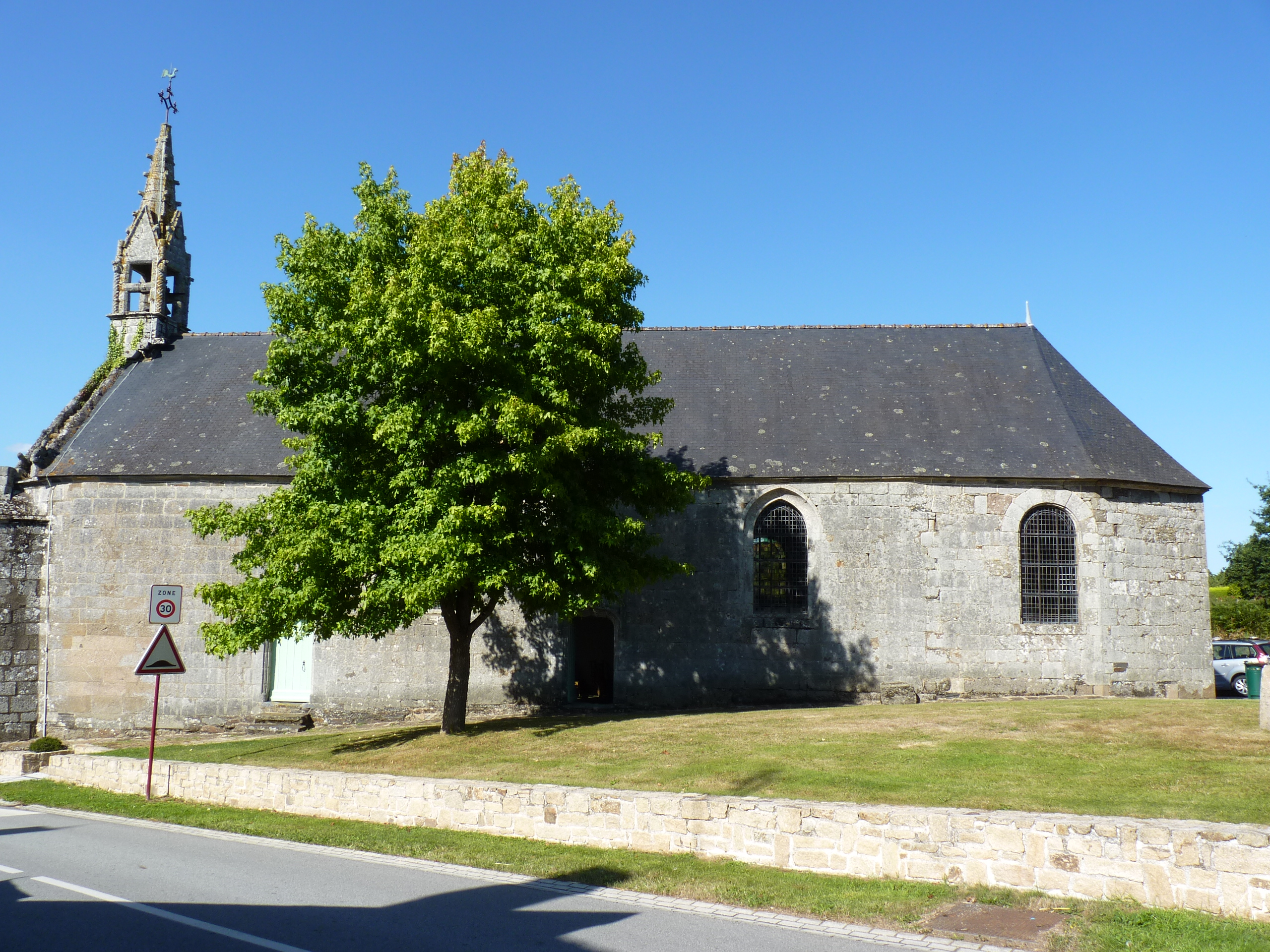
- The chapel of Notre-Dame de la Croix, in Plélauff
- Location of Plélauff
- Location within France Location within Brittany
- Coordinates: 48°12′26″N 3°12′30″W
- Country: France
- Region: Brittany
- Department: Côtes-d'Armor
- Arrondissement: Guingamp
- Canton: Rostrenen
- Intercommunality: Kreiz-Breizh

Government
  - Mayor (2020–2026): Bernard Rohou
- Area^{1}: 25.51 km^{2} (9.85 sq mi)
- Highest elevation: 273 m (896 ft)
- Lowest elevation: 123 m (404 ft)
- Population (2023): 716
  - Density: 28.1/km^{2} (72.7/sq mi)
- Time zone: UTC+01:00 (CET)
  - Summer (DST): UTC+02:00 (CEST)
- INSEE/Postal code: 22181 /22570
- ^{1} French Land Register data, which excludes lakes, ponds, glaciers > 1 km^{2} (0.386 sq mi or 247 acres) and river estuaries.

Plélauff (French pronunciation: [plelof]; Breton: Pellann) is a commune in the Côtes-d'Armor department of Brittany in northwestern France.

== Toponym ==
Like for other cities like Guiscriff, Plogoff or the surnames Le Hénaff, Heussaff or Gourcuff, the digraph -ff was introduced by Middle Ages' authors to indicate a nasalized vowel.

== Population ==
Historical population

Year	Pop.	±% p.a.
1793	1,191	—
1800	1,101	−1.12%
1806	1,249	+2.12%
1821	1,143	−0.59%
1831	1,362	+1.77%
1836	1,358	−0.06%
1841	1,300	−0.87%
1846	1,440	+2.07%
1851	1,448	+0.11%
1856	1,290	−2.28%
1861	1,275	−0.23%
1866	1,578	+4.36%
1872	1,257	−3.72%
1876	1,286	+0.57%
1881	1,382	+1.45%
1886	1,430	+0.69%
1891	1,490	+0.83%
1896	1,554	+0.84%
1901	1,520	−0.44%

Year	Pop.	±% p.a.
1906	1,530	+0.13%
1911	1,596	+0.85%
1921	1,623	+0.17%
1926	1,636	+0.16%
1931	1,545	−1.14%
1936	1,406	−1.87%
1946	1,190	−1.65%
1954	1,049	−1.56%
1962	957	−1.14%
1968	842	−2.11%
1975	741	−1.81%
1982	695	−0.91%
1990	679	−0.29%
1999	689	+0.16%
2007	688	−0.02%
2012	687	−0.03%
2017	634	−1.59%
2023	716	+2.05%

Source: EHESS and INSEE (1968-2023)

Inhabitants of Plélauff are called plélauffiens in French.

== Map ==
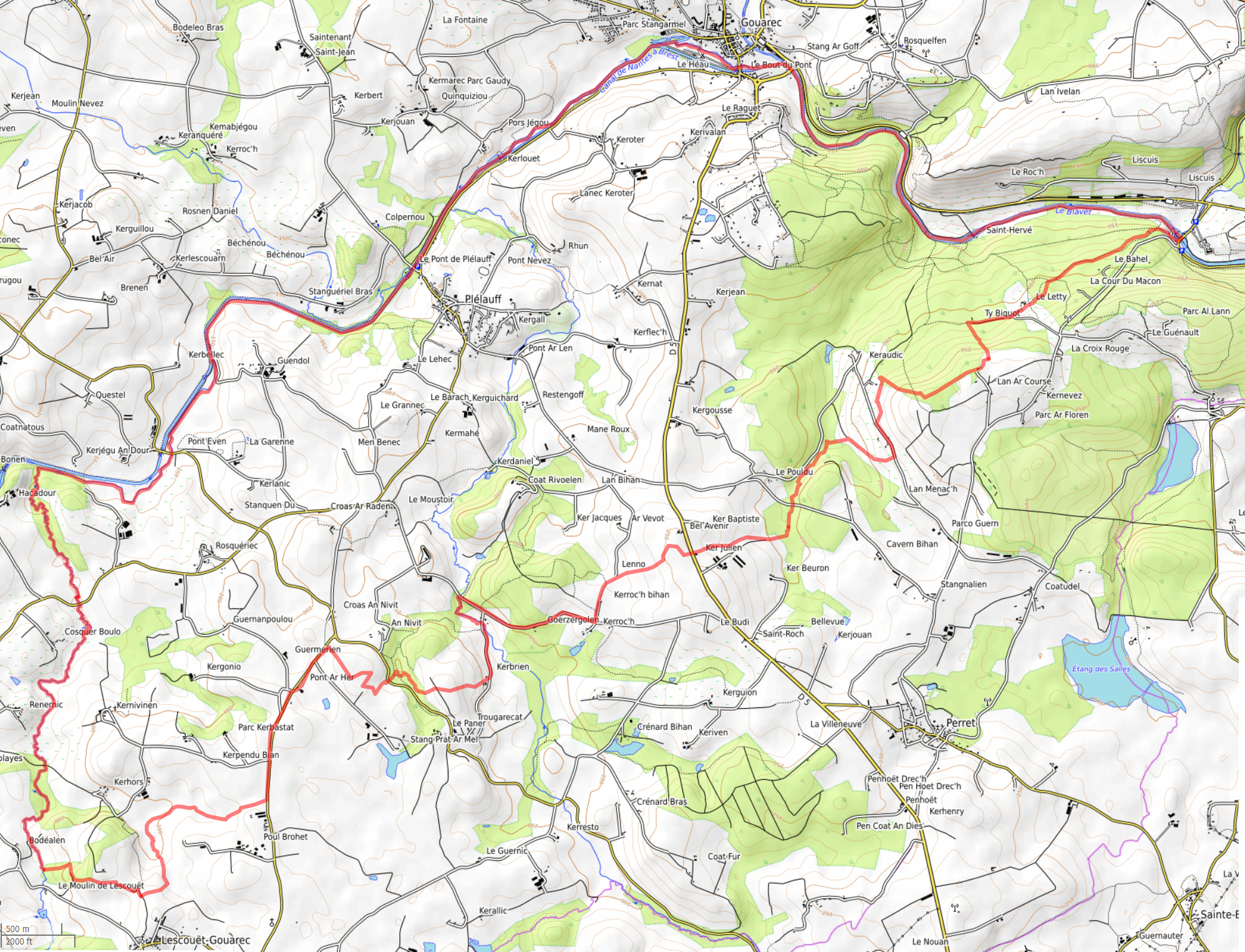
Topographic map

== See also ==
- Communes of the Côtes-d'Armor department
