= Cap Sizun =

Headland in Finistère, France

Coordinates: 48°3′N 4°33′W

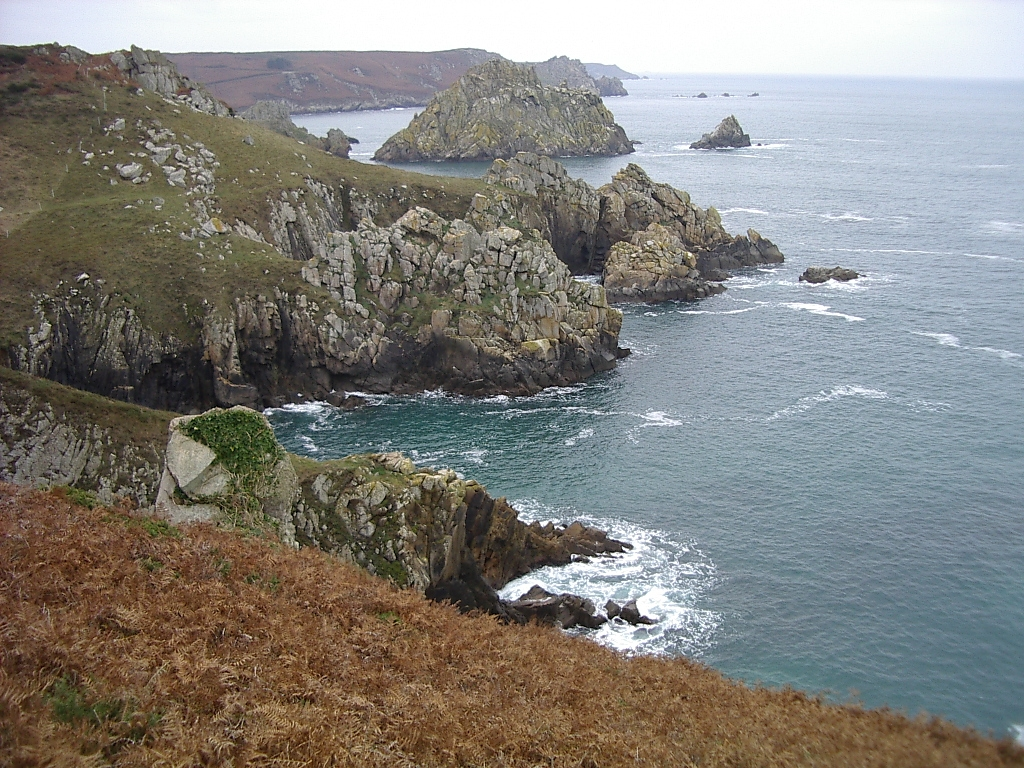
The north side of Cap Sizun is formed by a succession of points and small bays. Here the pointe de Karn Uhel and îlot du Milinou in the commune of Goulien.

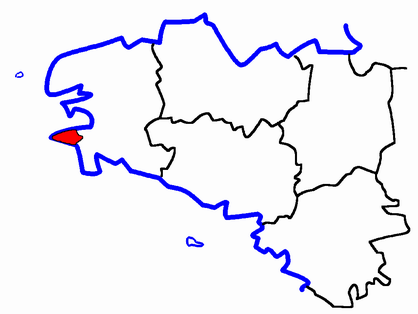
In red, the former canton of Pont-Croix

Flag of Cap Sizun

The Cap Sizun (French pronunciation: [kap sizɛ̃]; Breton: Ar C'hab) is a headland forming the western extremity of the Cornouaille, in the French département of Finistère in Brittany, corresponding to the former canton of Pont-Croix.

The best known sites in this region are the pointe du Raz, the pointe du Van, and, between these two points, the baie des Trépassés.

The Cap Sizun reaches out into the Atlantic Ocean, bordered to the north by the baie de Douarnenez, and to the south by the baie d'Audierne.

The territory of Cap Sizun is formed by the communes of Pont-Croix, Audierne, Plouhinec, Confort-Meilars, Mahalon, Esquibien, Beuzec-Cap-Sizun, Goulien, Cléden-Cap-Sizun, Primelin, Plogoff and the Île-de-Sein. This territory is covered by a commonality of communes (Communauté de communes du Cap-Sizun), which includes all the above communes except île de Sein.

== Bibliography ==
- (in French) Cap-Sizun - Au pays de la pointe du Raz et de l'île de Sein, par Serge Duigou et Jean-Michel Le Boulanger, Éditions Palantines, 2005, 239 pages, ISBN 2-911434-45-5
- (in French) La Révolution au fond du Cap-Sizun, de l'Abbé Corentin Parcheminou, paru en 1935, réédité en 2003 par Le Livre d'Histoire-Lorisse, Paris, ISBN 2-84373-286-7 ;
- (in French) Pilleurs du Cap! Le pillage d'épaves dans les paroisses du Cap-Sizun au XVIII° siècle, de Paul Cornec, Editions du Cap Sizun, 2001, ISBN 2-9516122-1-4 ;
- (in French) Le Couvent des Capucins d'Audierne, 1657–1795, Fondation, vie et disparition d'une institution française, Paul Cornec, Editions du Cap Sizun,
- (in French) Contes du Cap-Sizun, traduits du Breton par Roger Gargadennec, Librairie d'Amérique et d'Orient Adrien Maisonneuve Paris, 1973
- (in French) Hyacinthe Le Carguet, un passeur de mémoire en Cap-Sizun, présenté par Paul Cornec, Editions du Cap-Sizun, 9, rue Danton 29770 Audierne, 332 pages, ISBN 978-2-9516122-3-5
