= Plogoff =

Plogoff Plougoñ
- Commune
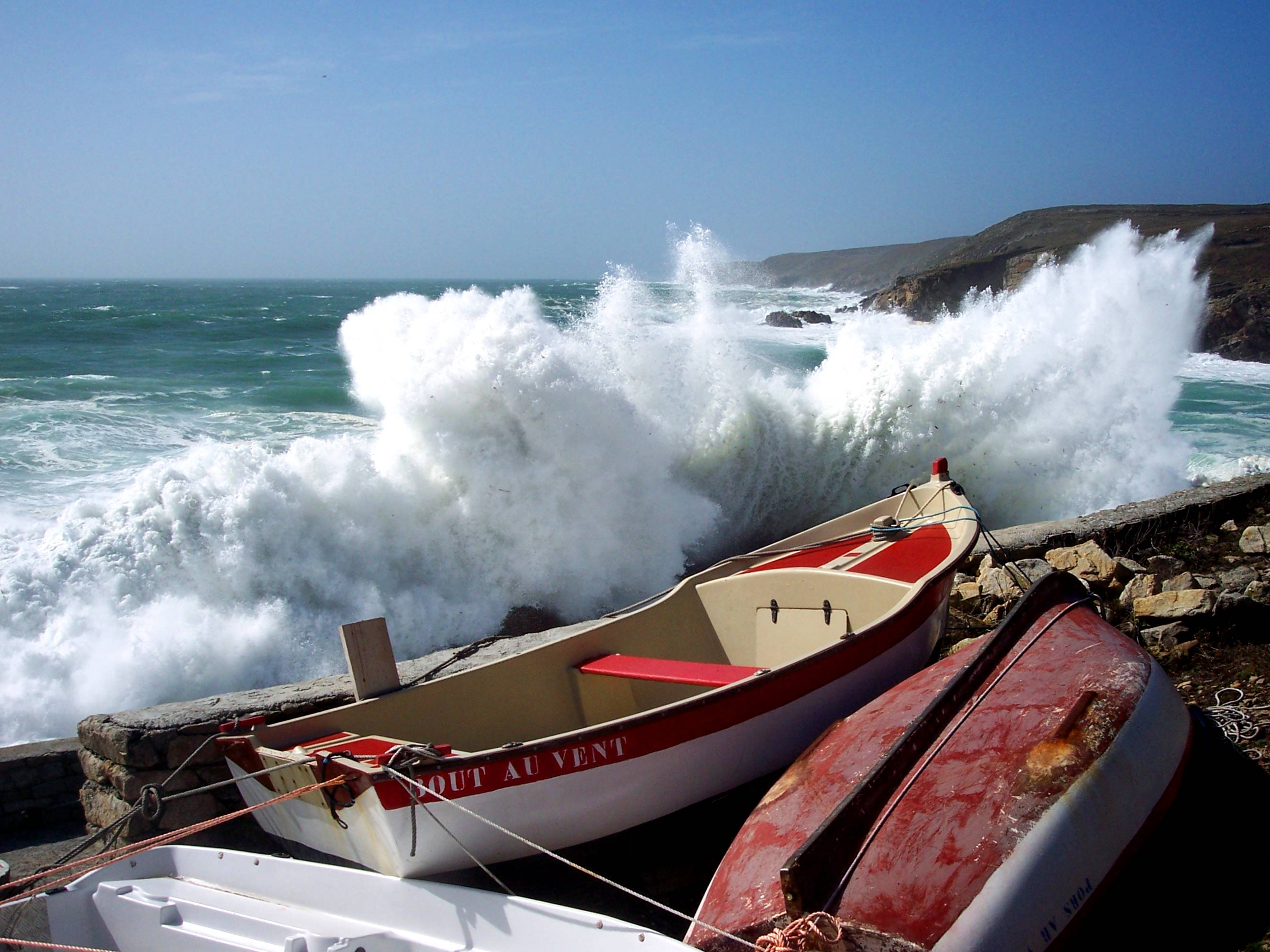
- A storm at Pors Loubous

- Coat of arms
- Location of Plogoff
- Location within France Location within Brittany
- Coordinates: 48°02′15″N 4°39′53″W
- Country: France
- Region: Brittany
- Department: Finistère
- Arrondissement: Quimper
- Canton: Douarnenez
- Intercommunality: Cap Sizun - Pointe du Raz

Government
  - Mayor (2020–2026): Joël Yvenou
- Area^{1}: 11.73 km^{2} (4.53 sq mi)
- Highest elevation: 80 m (260 ft)
- Lowest elevation: 0 m (0 ft)
- Population (2023): 1,131
  - Density: 96.42/km^{2} (249.7/sq mi)
- Time zone: UTC+01:00 (CET)
  - Summer (DST): UTC+02:00 (CEST)
- INSEE/Postal code: 29168 /29770
- ^{1} French Land Register data, which excludes lakes, ponds, glaciers > 1 km^{2} (0.386 sq mi or 247 acres) and river estuaries.

Plogoff (French pronunciation: [plɔɡɔf]; Breton: Plougoñ) is a commune in the Finistère department of Brittany in north-western France.

It contains three small ports suitable for small vessels: Pors-Loubous, Feunten-Aod and Bestrée. Local industries include tourism, traditional biscuits, agriculture and fishing.

== Population ==
Inhabitants of Plogoff are called in French Plogoffistes.

== Toponymy ==
As for other cities like Guiscriff, Plélauff or the surnames Le Hénaff, Heussaff or Gourcuff, the digraph -ff was introduced by mediaeval authors to indicate a nasalized vowel.

== Geography ==
The village centre is located 42 km (26 mi) west of Quimper. Historically, Plogoff belongs to Cornouaille.

== Maps ==
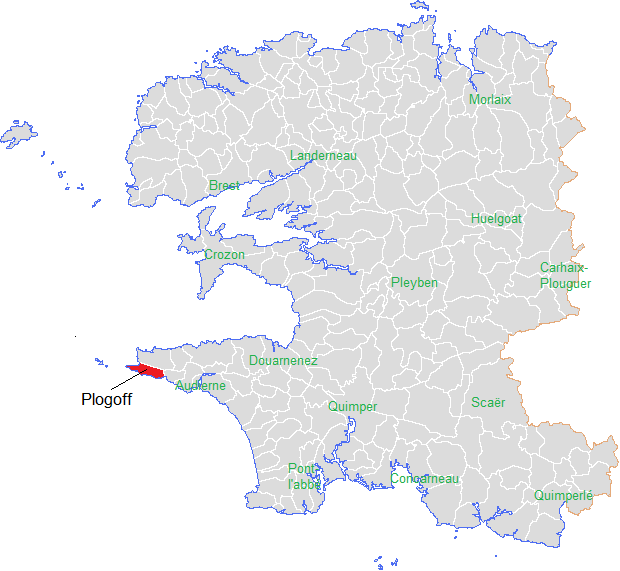
Map of Finistère.

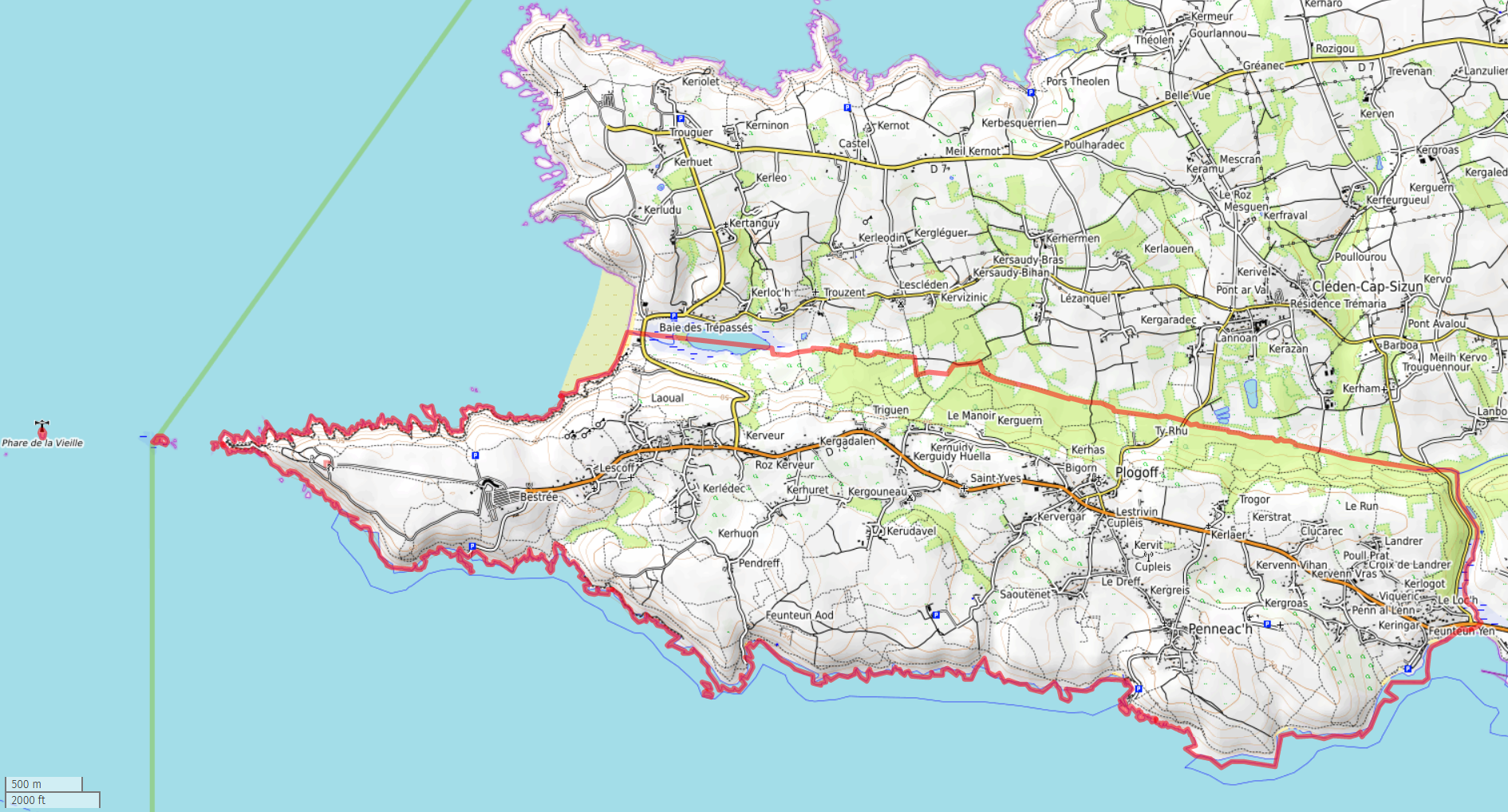
Topographic map

== Nuclear plant project ==
In the early 1970s, the French state power company, EDF, decided to establish a nuclear power plant in Brittany. The first proposed site was in Erdeven, Morbihan, but objections arose. EDF then proposed Ploumoguer, Finistère, just north of Brest. Councilmen around Brest redirected their attention to Plogoff. Local residents then blocked access to the site in 1976, while protests resumed in 1978 and 1979.

In 1980, the national government and EDF attempted to fulfil their statutory obligations to display the required inquiry documents in the local mairie or city hall. Local officials burned the documents and refused to allow replacements to be displayed. In response, the national government set up mobile mairies annexes to display the documents in town centres. These mairies annexes became the focus of the protest movement.

For 45 days, the riot police (CRS), the military police (gendarmerie) and some parachutists (EPIGN) guarded the mairies annexes while coming under attack from the protesters.

Once the obligation to display the documents had been met, the protesters occupied the proposed site.

In 1981 François Mitterrand was elected President of France. Mitterrand carried out his campaign promise to cancel the project.

A documentary Plogoff, des pierres contre des fusils (Plogoff, stones against rifles) relating the struggle against the French security forces was later produced by Nicole and Félix Le Garrec.

== See also ==
- Communes of the Finistère department
- List of the works of the Maître de Plougastel

== Gallery ==
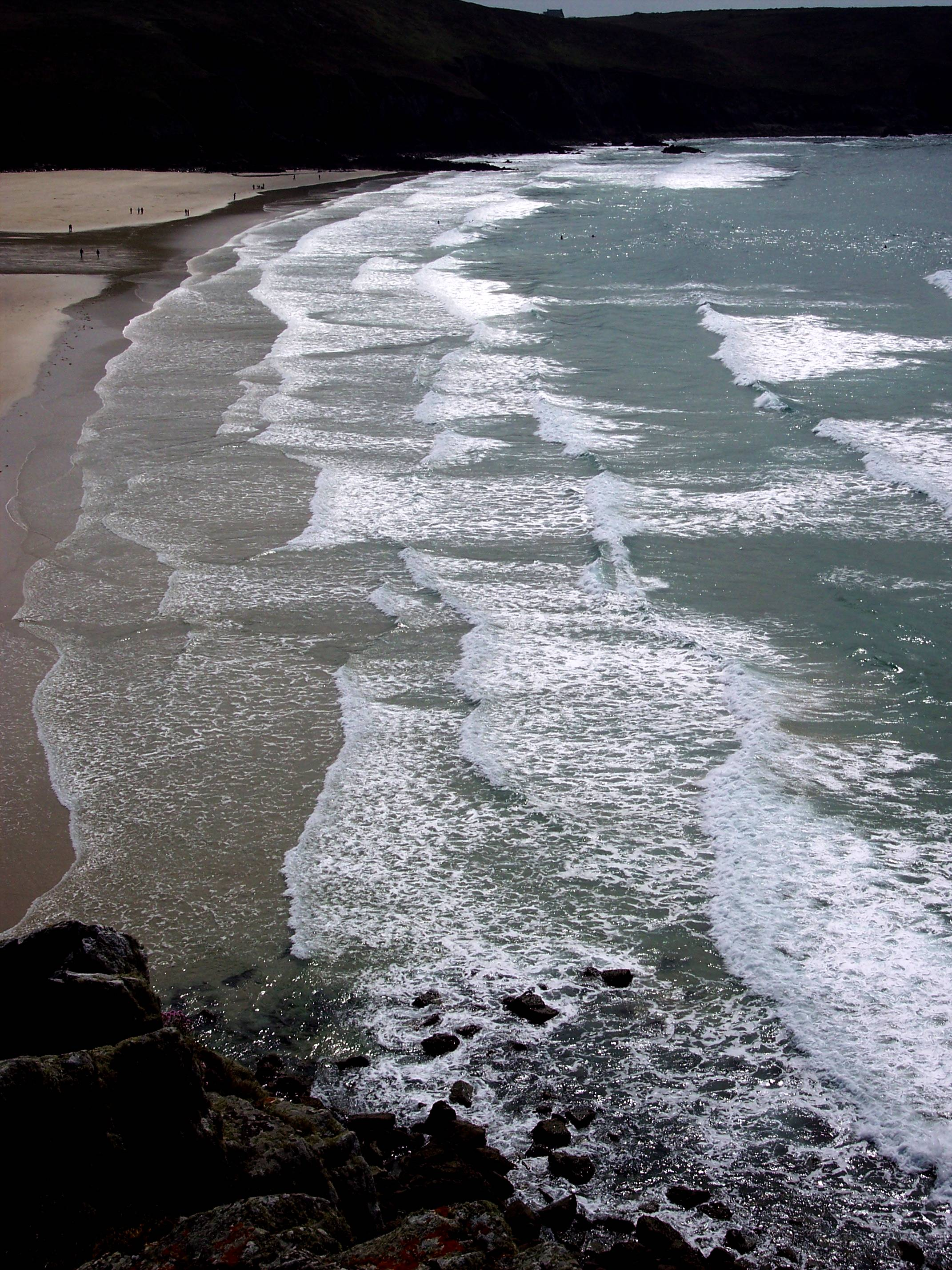
The Bay of Trépassés

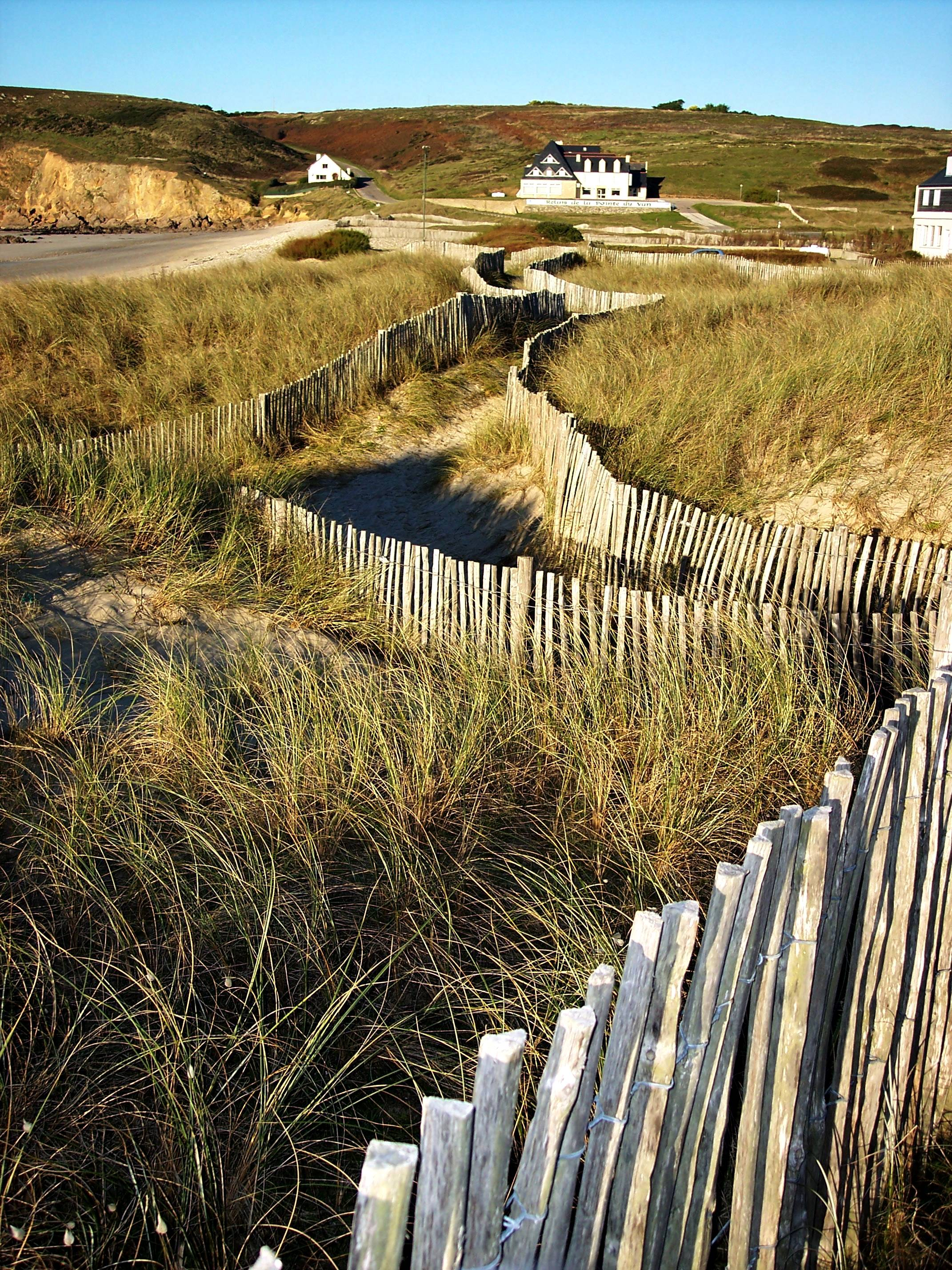
Dunes at the Baie des Trépassés
