= List of works by René Quillivic =

- Born: René Quillivic; 13 May 1879; Plouhinec in Finistère
- Died: 8 April 1969 (aged 89); Paris
- Occupations: Sculptor, Woodcut engraver and ceramicist

Works of René Quillivic

This listing covers some but not all of this Breton sculptor's work.

== Works ==
=== The Pont Albert-Louppe between Brest and Plougastel-Daoulas ===
The Albert Louppe bridge crosses the Élorn estuary and joins Brest with the Île de Plougastel. It is made from reinforced cement. The river separates la Cornouaille from Léon and Quillivic's sculptures of couples from both districts decorate the bridge. The bridge had been opened in 1930 but was replaced in 1994 by the Pont de l’Iroise when it could no longer cope with the volume of traffic. The Albert Louppe bridge was retained but for pedestrians only and Quillivic's sculptures remain on view.

=== "La Bigoudène" ===
Quillivic's statue "La Bigoudène" at Pors-Poulhan marks the border between the areas of Pays Bigouden and Cap Sizun.

=== Statue in honour of Commandant Charcot ===
This statue depicting the explorer Charcot stands in St Malo's Jardin de Solidor in the Quai Sébastopol.

=== "Le Groupe des sonneurs bretons" ===
In 1907, Quillivic won the Gold Medal at the Salon des Beaux-Arts for the composition "Le Groupe des sonneurs bretons" depicting two Breton Pipers. This is shown here.

=== "La Brodeuse de Pont-l'Abbé" ===
With this work Quillivic won a bursary which provided funds for travel to North Africa and Italy to enable him study sculptures at first hand. It can be seen in the Musée des Beaux-Arts de Quimper. Several of Quillivic's works are preserved in this art museum, including his sculpture "L'appel de la mer" ('The call of the sea'), which was initially intended for the Breton pavilion at the 1939 Exposition des arts décoratifs in Paris. The semi naked female figure was considered too provocative and was replaced by a Madonna and Child by Jules-Charles Le Bozec. The gallery also holds other statues depicting the artist's mother and portraits of heads of children.

=== Monument to René Laennec ===
This work dates to 1942 and depicts the French inventor of the stethoscope.

=== Bust of Prosper Roux ===
The poet spent several years at Guerlesquin and this Quillivic monument was erected in his honour in 1919.

=== "Bretonne" ===
This work in granite can be seen in the Montbrison townhall.

=== Monument to Joseph Halléguen ===
Quillivic was commissioned to execute a bronze depicting a portrait of Halléguen, the politician and French Resistance member for his tomb in Quimper's St Joseph cemetery.

=== The Paris studio of René Quillivic ===
Quillivic had a studio in Paris' boulevard de Montmorency and the entrance to this studio is flanked by two statues representing women from Ploaré and Audierne. The façade of the building is decorated with Quillivic ceramics and the door knocker is shaped in the head of a woman.

=== War memorials ===
Quillivic worked on many war memorials. Here are some details although the listing may not cover all such memorials.

==== Le mémorial aux marins morts pour la France ====
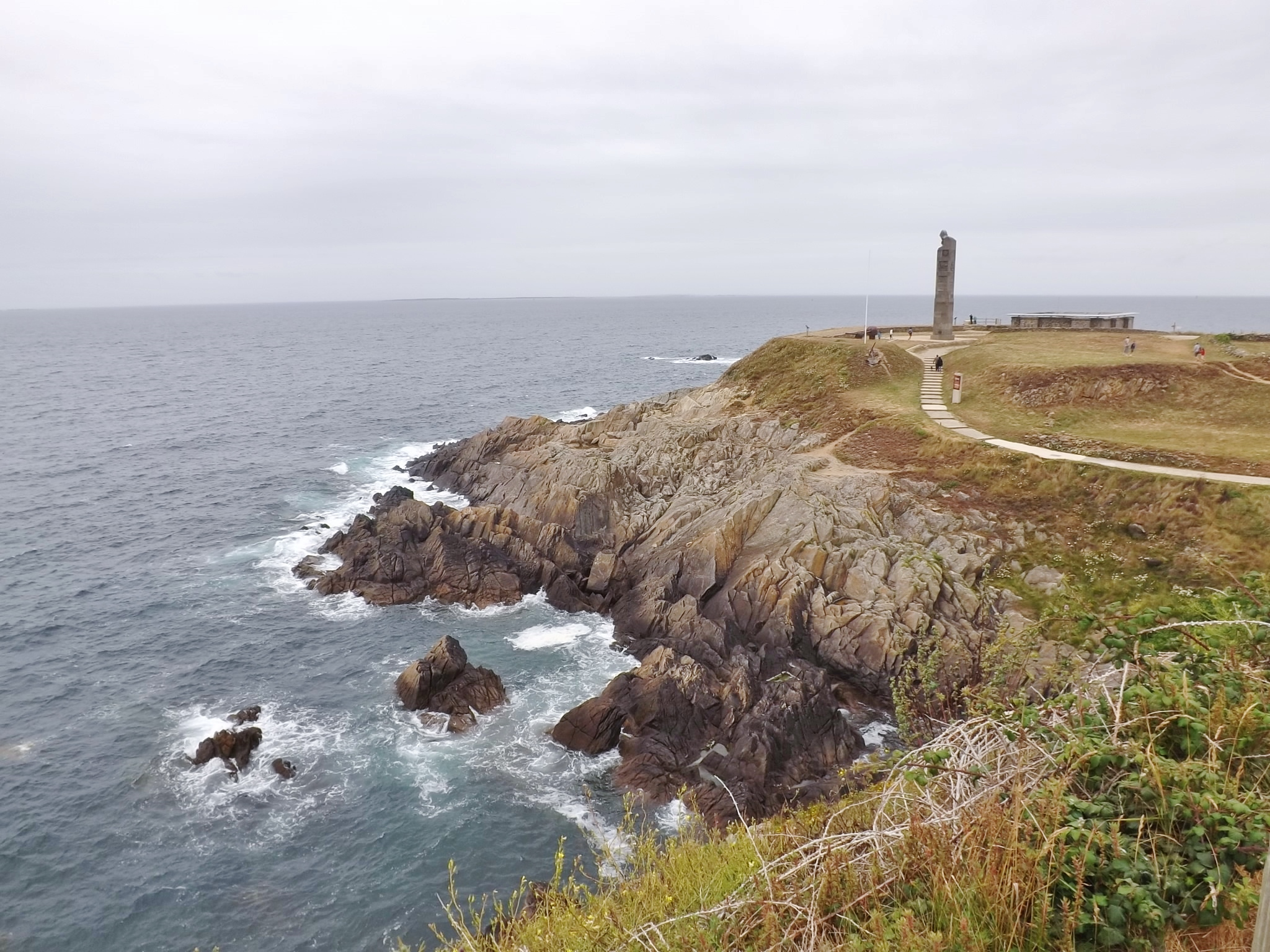
Le mémorial aux marins morts pour la France

At the summit of a huge column, 17 metres in height, is the head of a Breton woman, modelled by Quillivic's mother, mourning the death of a loved one; a son or a husband, a "Mater Dolorosa". The four sides of the pillar are decorated with Quillivic bas-reliefs. The monument was inaugurated on 12 June 1927 and stands at the most westerly point of the Cap Saint Mathieu. The monument stands by the remains of an old fort and over the years the site of the monument has become a memorial dedicated to all the sailors who died for France in the 20th century, a cenotaph for those lost at sea and whose bodies were never recovered. There is a crypt with a permanent exhibition of photographs of men lost at sea

==== Coray War Memorial ====
It seems that it was Quillivic's habit to select a member of the family of one particular name listed on a commune's memorial and to catch their likeness in the sculpture on which he was working thus making it "special" for each community. For the Coray memorial, he chose a 20-year-old girl called Marie-Louise Maguet, whose father was one of the dead listed. She is dressed in an authentic local costume and hat. She carries in her hand a branch from an oak tree, a symbol of wisdom and power. She stands next to the pedestal on which stands Quillivic's sculpture of a standing soldier.

==== Bannalec War Memorial ====
For Bannalec's memorial, Quillivic sculpted the figure of a woman, this time the likeness being based on Marie Le Bourhis the sister of Jean Le Bourhis, an aviator who was killed in aerial combat in 1916. She wears traditional Breton dress. The work dates to 1921 and stands in the Place Charles de Gaulle by Bannalec's marie. There is also a bronze bas-relief which depicts a soldier and a cross.

==== Châteaulin War Memorial ====
Here Quillivic depicts a standing soldier in front of an artillery shell. The memorial dates to 1921. The memorial stands in Chateaulin's Place du 2e bataillon Stalingrad by the Église Saint Idunet.

==== Roscoff War Memorial ====
The war memorial stands in the old "cimetière marin du Vil" in the avenue Tristan Corbière and has two bronze plaques by Quillivic dating to 1920. One depicts a marine and the other an infantryman.

==== Fouesnant War Memorial ====
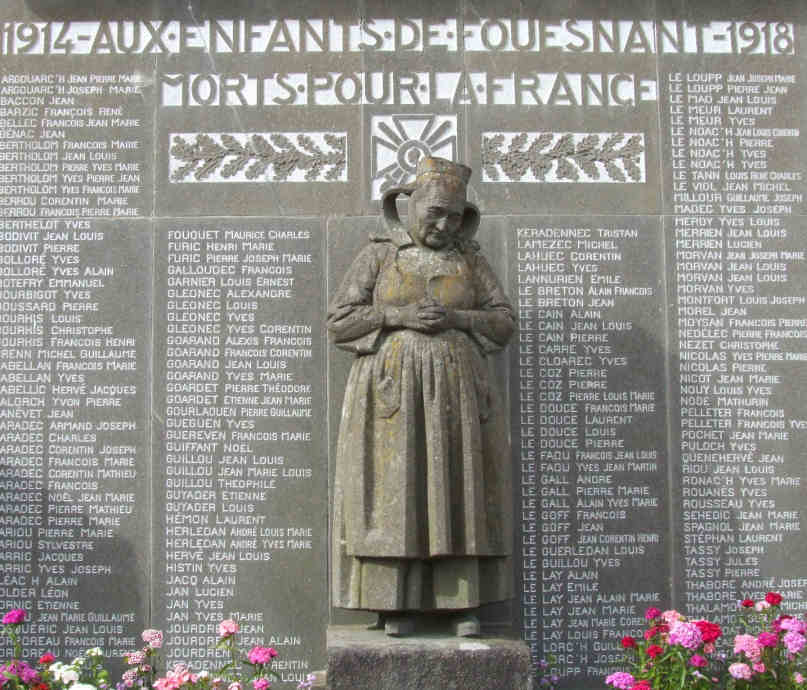
Fouesnant war memorial

Here Quillivic modelled the woman featuring in his sculpture on Marie-Jeanne Kerangel who had lost three sons in the 1914-1918 war. Quillivic had shown the sculpture at the 1922 Salon de la Société Nationale des Beaux-Arts. It is carved from kersantite. In 1925 a reduction in pottery was made by Verlingue-Bolloré as a limited edition. Two hundred and nineteen names are listed as victims of the 1914-1918 war and later the names of those killed in the Second World War and in Indochina and Algeria were added.

==== Plouhinec War Memorial ====
Quillivic was born and brought up in Plouhinec and used his own mother as the model for the Breton woman, the centre-piece of the memorial. His mother wears the traditional head-dress of Cap Sizun.

===== Other works in Plouhinec =====
Apart from the war memorial, the commune also has a bronze bust of Quillivic's mother in a traditional head-dress, this on public display near his family home. Also in Plouhinec are a sculpture of Saint Jacques, and an uncompleted Calvary, or carved cross.

=== War memorials (continued) ===
==== Plouyé War Memorial ====
This memorial stands at the entrance to Plouyé's cemetery. Quillivic carved the Breton woman wearing mourning clothes from an 8-ton block of kersantite.

==== Scaër War Memorial ====
On one side of a pedestal, Quillivic sculpted a soldier and on the opposite side a Scaër woman in the local dress. As a model for the woman, Quillivic used a local girl, Marguerite Belleguic, who ran a kiosk outside the church. The mairie have kept the two maquettes for the soldier and the woman.

==== Carhaix-Plouguer War Memorial ====
Quillivic worked on this memorial, which stands in Carhaix-Plouguer's Rue de l'Église in front of the Église Saint-Tremeur, in 1929. He sculpted a standing soldier using dark granite who is stood on a pedestal whilst below a second statue depicts a Breton woman her hand on her chest and clearly in mourning. The communes of Carhaix and Plouguer merged to form Carhaix-Plouguer in 1957 but they had their own war memorials and Quillivic worked on that in Carhaix.

==== Plozévet War Memorial ====
For Plozévet's 1922 memorial which is located in the Rue d'Audierne by the Église Saint-Démet, Quillivic carved the figure of a Breton carrying a Bigouden hat in his hand, the man based on Plozévet's Sébastien Le Gouill who had lost his three sons and a son-in-law in the 1914-1918 war. He stands next to a menhir.

==== Pont-Croix War Memorial ====
Pont-Croix's war memorial is situated behind the Collégiale and dates to 1922. A woman in local dress is Quillivic's composition here and she stands, lost in thought, with a soldier's helmet laying at her feet. At the base of the pedestal is the inscription in the Breton language

"or gwad d'ar vro. Hon ene da Zoue"

which translates as "Our blood for the motherland, our soul for God".

==== Saint-Pol-de-Léon War Memorial ====
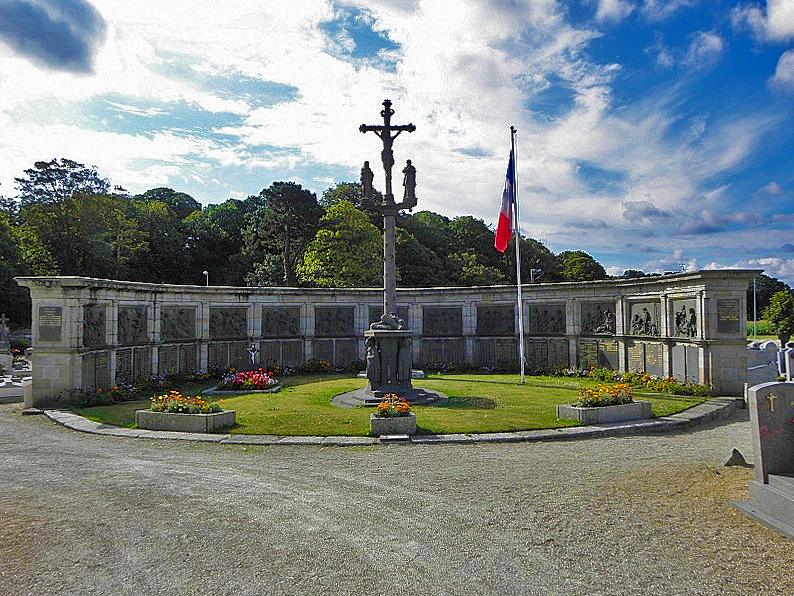
Saint-Pol-de-Léon war memorial

This was the first memorial to the dead of the 1914-1918 war erected in Finistère, Quillivic working with the architect Charles Chaussepied. It dates to 1919. The memorial was placed near an existing Calvary and a semi-circular wall to which were affixed the "Stations of the cross" by Yann Larhantec. They added their composition, a most imaginative one, depicting four women in Breton dress who support a slab on which lies a soldier. The four Breton women are placed at the corners of the slab They wear different headdresses and Quillivic endeavoured to embrace "all social groups and ages".

==== Guiclan War Memorial ====
This memorial dates to 1922 and bears two bas-reliefs. One depicts a man and a woman in mourning and above this the other depicts a soldier in profile. The implication is that the couple are the parents of the soldier who has lost his life.

==== Pleumeur-Bodou in Morbihan War Memorial ====
This 1922 memorial has two bas-reliefs by Quillivic, one depicts a soldier and the other a sailor.

==== Loudéac War Memorial ====
Here Quillivic features a soldier and a woman in Breton dress. It seems the woman's image was based on that of Cécile Ollitrault a young woman from Loudéac who lived in Paris and came along to Quillivic's studio for the model to be made.

==== Pont-Scorff War Memorial ====
For this 1919 memorial Quillivic produced a work inspired by ancient Breton calvaries with a medallion depicting Henri de Polignac the ex-mayor of Pont-Scorff set into the cross as well as the names of those honoured and a text written in the Breton language.

=== Woodcuts ===
Quillivic was an accomplished engraver and his woodcuts are highly valued.

=== Ceramics ===
Quillivic's pottery figures are well regarded and he worked with several producers of "faience"
