= René Quillivic =

French sculptor

René Quillivic (1879–1969) was a French sculptor whose art expressed Breton cultural identity. His work was part of the painting event in the art competition at the 1928 Summer Olympics.

== Life ==
René Quillivic was born on 13 May 1879 in the town of Plouhinec, Finistère, in a small house bordering one side of what is currently known as the "Place Jean Cosquer". He came from a family of fishermen, but was apprenticed to a carpenter. He decided to pursue an artistic career as a sculptor and was accepted by the École nationale supérieure des Beaux-Arts in Paris, where he joined the workshop of Antonin Mercier. He exhibited at the Salon des Indépendants and the Salon des Artistes Français. In 1907, he won the gold medal at the Salon des Beaux-Arts for no: Le groupe des sonneurs bretons (Group of Breton Pipers). The following year, another of his works, La Brodeuse de Pont-l'Abbé (Pont-l'Abbé Embroiderer), gave him access to funds for travels to North Africa and Italy.

He pursued his career creating public memorial sculptures in his home department of Finistère, Brittany. His work was part of the Breton cultural renaissance associated with the art movement Seiz Breur.

He died in Paris on April 8, 1969. His son, of the same name, became a well-known artist and printmaker.

== Works ==
After World War I he had the opportunity to pursue his art in the form of war memorials, in which he typically emphasised pacifist ideals. Most of these were located in Finistère (Carhaix, Coray, Fouesnant, Loudéac, Plouhinec, Plouyé, Plozévet, Pont-Croix, Pont-l'Abbé, and Saint-Pol-de-Leon). The best known of his war memorials, and one of the four Quillivic pieces in his birthplace of Plouhinec, is a statue of a woman wearing a mourning cape, hands folded in prayer. Carved in granite, she accompanies a stele listing the victims of the war; his mother was the model for the statue. A bronze bust of Quillivic's mother in a traditional headdress is also exhibited nearby in his family home. Also in his home town are a sculpture of Saint Jacques, and an uncompleted Calvary, or carved cross.

His inspiration arose mainly from Breton culture. This use of local models familiar to the people became a hallmark of his work. Thus, in Bannalec, the local people could recognize in the monument the likeness of the sister of the locally famous aviator Jean Bourhis, who had been killed in the war. Qullivic also included the image of Bourhis's airplane on the principal relief. According to Sylvie Blottière-Derrien "Rene Quillivic was known to be the promoter of a typically Breton commemorative sculpture". His La Bigoudène at Pors-Poulhan marks the border between the areas of Pays Bigouden and Cap Sizun. His sculpted pillar dedicated to deceased Breton sailors stands at Pointe Saint-Mathieu.

Several of his works are preserved in Quimper art gallery, including his sculpture L'appel de la mer (The Appeal to the Sea), which was initially intended for the Breton pavilion at the 1939 Exposition des arts décoratifs in Paris. The semi naked female figure was considered too provocative and was replaced by a Madonna and Child by Jules-Charles Le Bozec. The gallery also holds other statues depicting the artist's mother, portrait heads of children and La Brodeuse de Pont-l'Abbé, the large bronze of a young Breton embroiderer.

Quillivic's media vary. His sculptures are usually Breton granite, Kersantite, or bronze. He also made wood-engravings, and is known for his seascapes.

== See also ==
- List of works by René Quillivic
