= Le Cunff =

Breton-language surname

- Pronunciation: pronounced [lə ˈkỹːf]

Origin
- Origin: Breton
- Meaning: the gentle/affable one
- Region of origin: Brittany

Other names
- Variant forms: Le Cun, Le Cunf

Le Cunff or Le Cun is a Breton surname meaning "the gentle", "the affable", or "the debonnaire".

Similarly to the surnames Gourcuff and Henaff, the digraph -ff was used in Middle Breton orthography to indicate a nasalized vowel. In many modern branches of the family, this spelling has been simplified to a single "n". The root kuñv (or kunv) remains a common adjective in modern Breton for someone of a mild or conciliatory temperament.

Individuals with the surname include:

- Anne-Laure Le Cunff (born 1990), French neuroscientist, author, and entrepreneur.
- Kévin Le Cunff (born 1988), French para-cyclist and multiple Paralympic gold medalist.
- Loïc Le Cunff, French molecular biology and genetics engineer at French Vine and Wine Institute
- Louis Le Cunff (1915–1991), French journalist and writer specializing in maritime and Breton culture.
- Yann LeCun (born 1960), born Yann Le Cun, French computer scientist and Turing Award winner.
- Armel Le Cunff, Canadian aviator and operator of Stoney Point (Le Cunff) Airport

== Places ==
- Stoney Point (Le Cunff) Airport, a registered aerodrome (TC LID: CRML) in Stoney Point, Ontario, Canada

== See also ==
- Gourcuff, a surname sharing the same root (gour meaning "man").
