= Poullan-sur-Mer =

Poullan-sur-Mer Poullann
- Commune
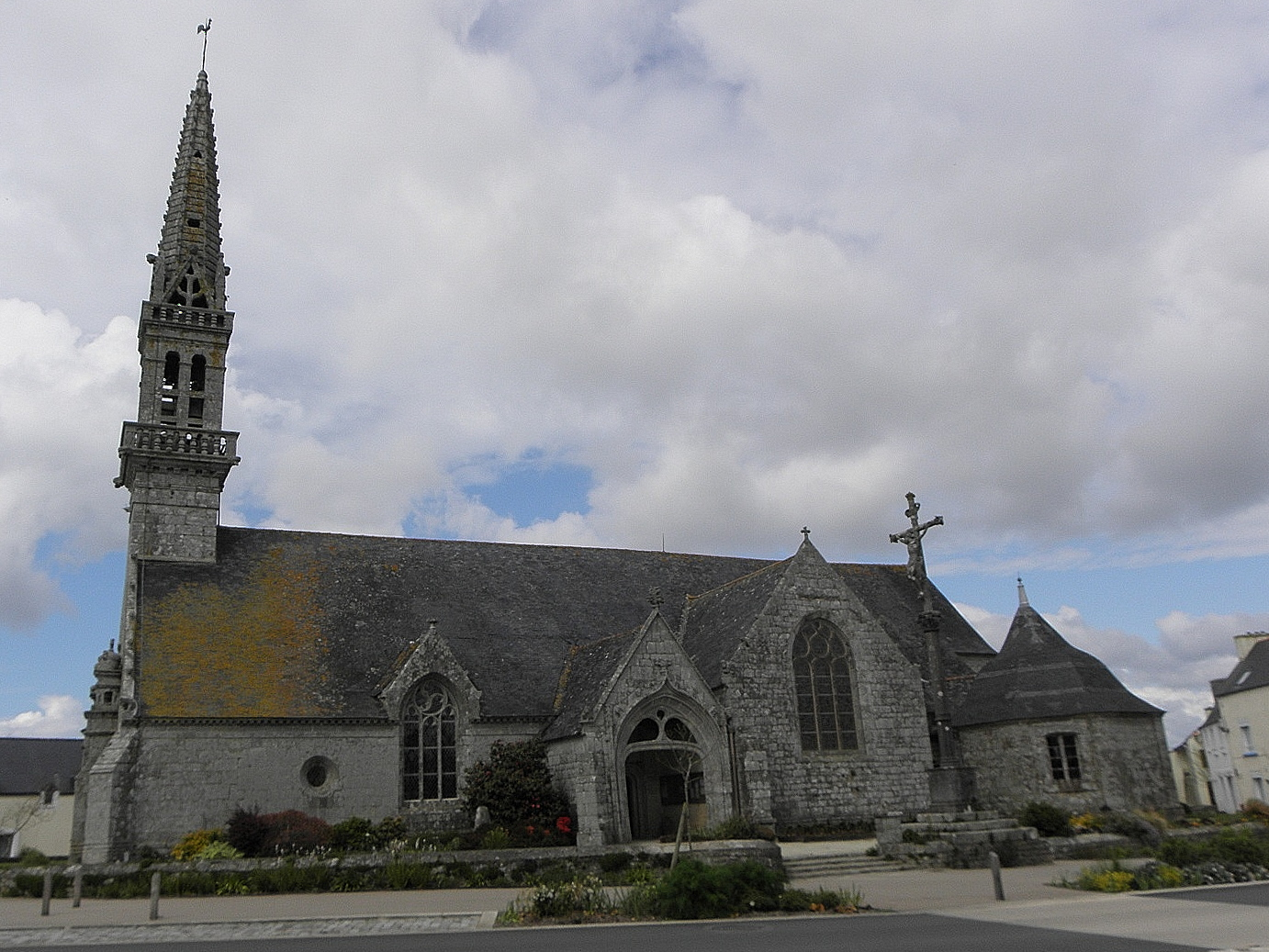
- The church of Saint-Cadoan, in Poullan-sur-Mer

- Coat of arms
- Location of Poullan-sur-Mer
- Location within France Location within Brittany
- Coordinates: 48°04′54″N 4°24′43″W
- Country: France
- Region: Brittany
- Department: Finistère
- Arrondissement: Quimper
- Canton: Douarnenez
- Intercommunality: Douarnenez Communauté

Government
  - Mayor (2024–2026): Marie-Pierre Bariou
- Area^{1}: 30.35 km^{2} (11.72 sq mi)
- Highest elevation: 101 m (331 ft)
- Lowest elevation: 0 m (0 ft)
- Population (2023): 1,453
  - Density: 47.87/km^{2} (124.0/sq mi)
- Time zone: UTC+01:00 (CET)
  - Summer (DST): UTC+02:00 (CEST)
- INSEE/Postal code: 29226 /29100
- ^{1} French Land Register data, which excludes lakes, ponds, glaciers > 1 km^{2} (0.386 sq mi or 247 acres) and river estuaries.

Poullan-sur-Mer (French pronunciation: [pulɑ̃ syʁ mɛʁ], literally Poullan on Sea; Breton: Poullann) is a commune in the Finistère department of Brittany in north-western France.

== Population ==
Inhabitants of Poullan-sur-Mer are called in French Poulannais.

Historical population
Year	Pop.	±% p.a.
1968	1,085	—
1975	1,269	+2.26%
1982	1,586	+3.24%
1990	1,627	+0.32%
1999	1,517	−0.77%
2007	1,470	−0.39%
2012	1,556	+1.14%
2017	1,516	−0.52%
2023	1,453	−0.70%
Source: INSEE

== See also ==
- Communes of the Finistère department
