= Beuzec-Cap-Sizun =

Beuzec-Cap-Sizun Beuzeg-ar-C’hab
- Commune
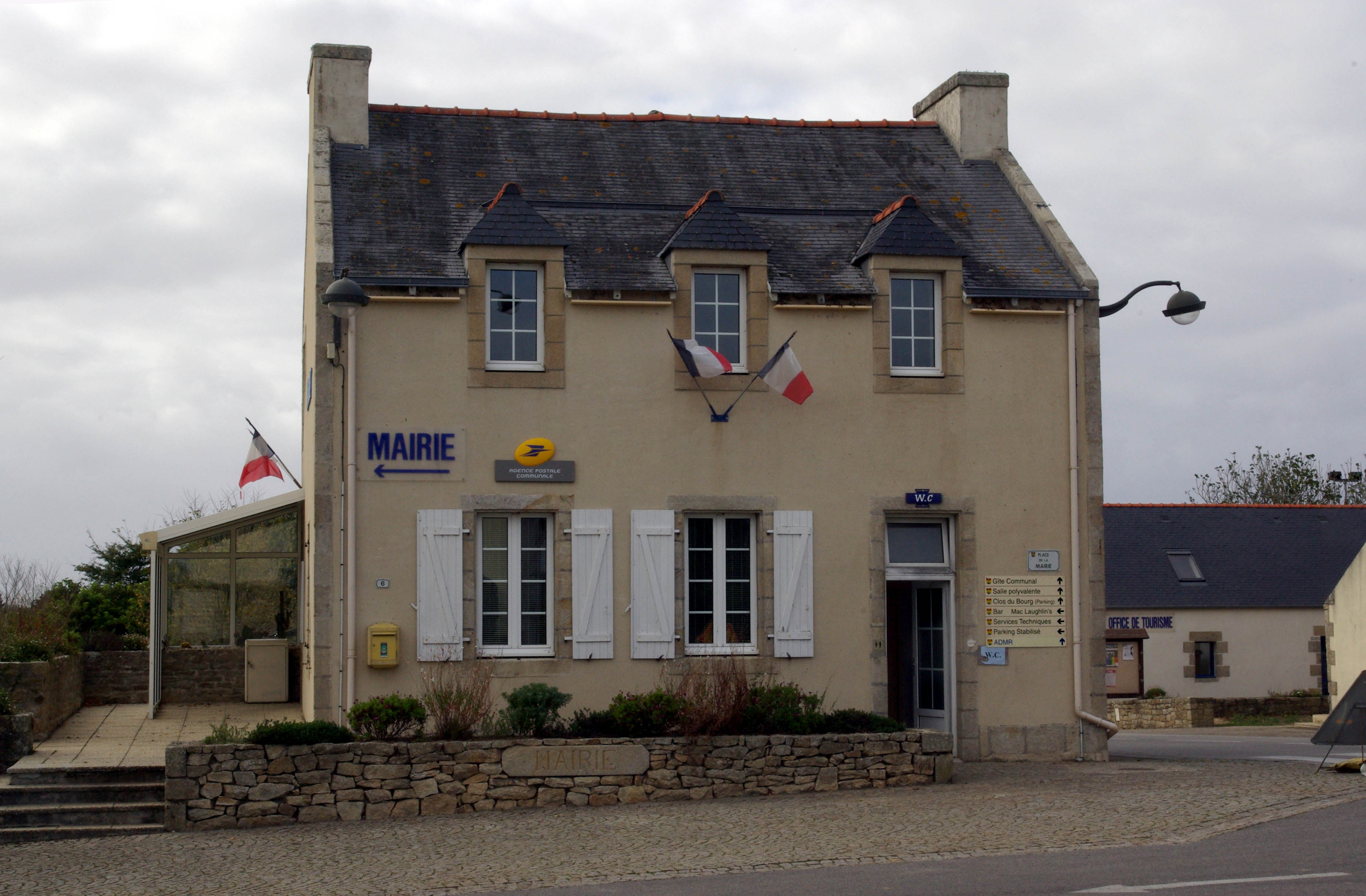
- Town hall
- Location of Beuzec-Cap-Sizun
- Location within France Location within Brittany
- Coordinates: 48°04′34″N 4°30′37″W
- Country: France
- Region: Brittany
- Department: Finistère
- Arrondissement: Quimper
- Canton: Douarnenez
- Intercommunality: Cap Sizun - Pointe du Raz

Government
  - Mayor (2020–2026): Gilles Sergent
- Area^{1}: 34.54 km^{2} (13.34 sq mi)
- Highest elevation: 99 m (325 ft)
- Lowest elevation: 0 m (0 ft)
- Population (2023): 1,008
  - Density: 29.18/km^{2} (75.59/sq mi)
- Time zone: UTC+01:00 (CET)
  - Summer (DST): UTC+02:00 (CEST)
- INSEE/Postal code: 29008 /29790
- Website: Official website
- ^{1} French Land Register data, which excludes lakes, ponds, glaciers > 1 km^{2} (0.386 sq mi or 247 acres) and river estuaries.

Beuzec-Cap-Sizun (French pronunciation: [bøzɛk kap sizœ̃]; Breton: Beuzeg-ar-C'hab) is a commune in the Finistère department of Brittany in north-western France, lying on the promontory of Cap Sizun.

== Population ==
Inhabitants of Beuzec-Cap-Sizun are called Beuzecois in French.

== See also ==
- Communes of the Finistère department
