= Canton of Douarnenez =

Coordinates: 48°04′06″N 4°17′12″W

Douarnenez
- Canton
- Interactive map of Douarnenez
- Country: France
- Region: Brittany
- Department: Finistère
- No. of communes: {{{nbcomm}}}
- Area: 283.48 km^{2} (109.45 sq mi)
- Population (2023): 33,915
  - Density: 119.64/km^{2} (309.86/sq mi)
- INSEE code: 29 10

The Canton of Douarnenez is a French canton, located in the Finistère département (Brittany région). Since the French canton reorganisation which came into effect in March 2015, the communes of the canton of Douarnenez are:

- Audierne
- Beuzec-Cap-Sizun
- Cléden-Cap-Sizun
- Confort-Meilars
- Douarnenez (seat)
- Goulien
- Île-de-Sein
- Le Juch
- Kerlaz
- Mahalon
- Plogoff
- Plouhinec
- Pont-Croix
- Pouldergat
- Primelin
- Poullan-sur-Mer

== See also ==
- Cantons of the Finistère department
- List of cantons of France
- Arrondissements of the Finistère department
