= Cléden-Cap-Sizun =

Cléden-Cap-Sizun Kledenn-ar-C'hab
- Commune
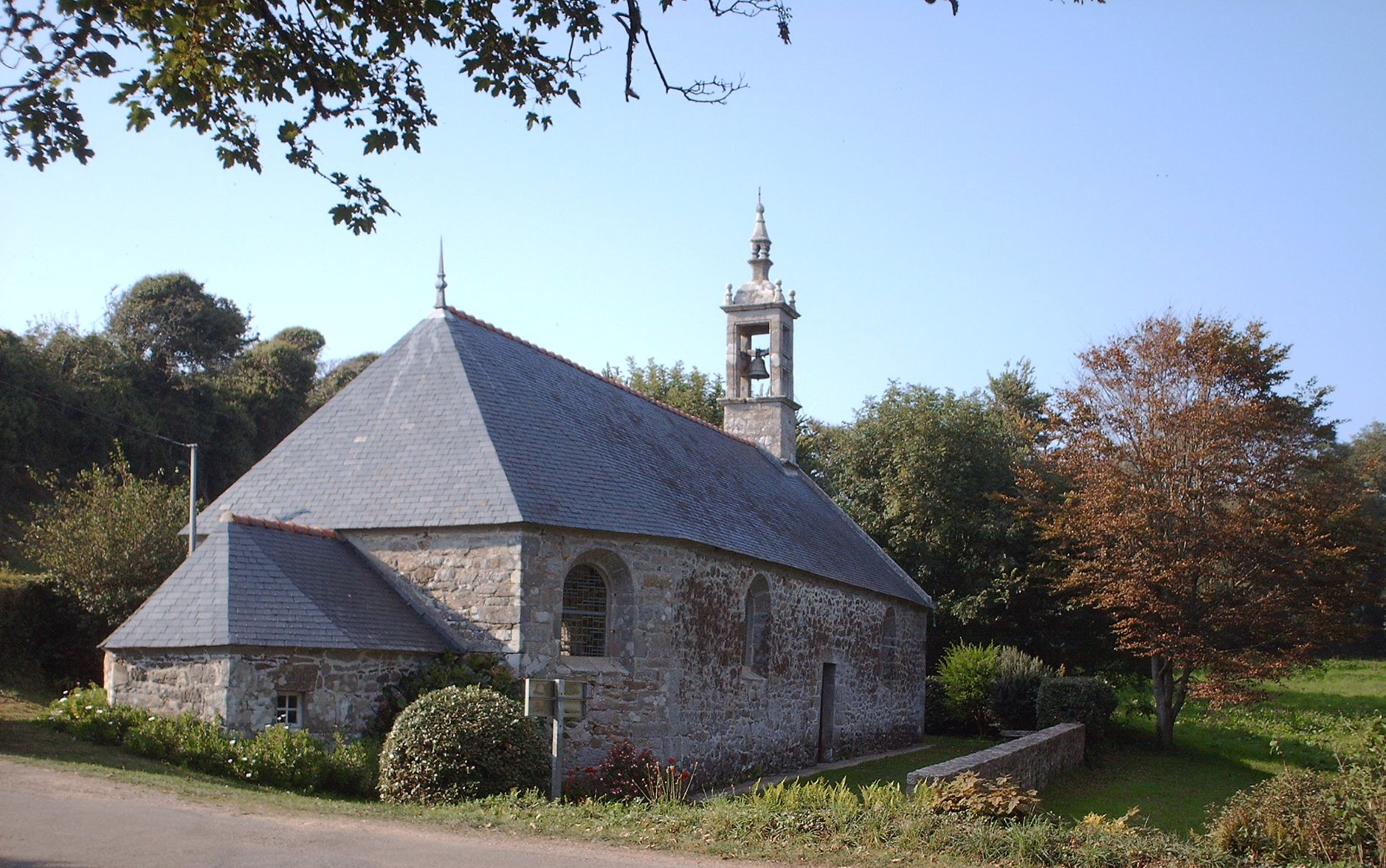
- Saint Tugdual Chapel

- Coat of arms
- Location of Cléden-Cap-Sizun
- Location within France Location within Brittany
- Coordinates: 48°02′54″N 4°38′46″W
- Country: France
- Region: Brittany
- Department: Finistère
- Arrondissement: Quimper
- Canton: Douarnenez
- Intercommunality: Cap Sizun - Pointe du Raz

Government
  - Mayor (2020–2026): Nadine Kersaudy
- Area^{1}: 19.08 km^{2} (7.37 sq mi)
- Highest elevation: 86 m (282 ft)
- Lowest elevation: 0 m (0 ft)
- Population (2023): 916
  - Density: 48.0/km^{2} (124/sq mi)
- Time zone: UTC+01:00 (CET)
  - Summer (DST): UTC+02:00 (CEST)
- INSEE/Postal code: 29028 /29770
- ^{1} French Land Register data, which excludes lakes, ponds, glaciers > 1 km^{2} (0.386 sq mi or 247 acres) and river estuaries.

Cléden-Cap-Sizun (French pronunciation: [kledɛ̃ kap sizœ̃]; Breton: Kledenn-ar-C'hab) is a commune in the Finistère department of Brittany in north-western France, lying on the promontory of Cap Sizun.

== Population ==
Inhabitants of Cléden-Cap-Sizun are called in French Clédinois.

== International relations ==
Cléden-Cap-Sizun is twinned with Ballydehob, County Cork, Ireland.

== See also ==
- Communes of the Finistère department
