= Le Juch =

Le Juch Ar Yeuc'h
- Commune
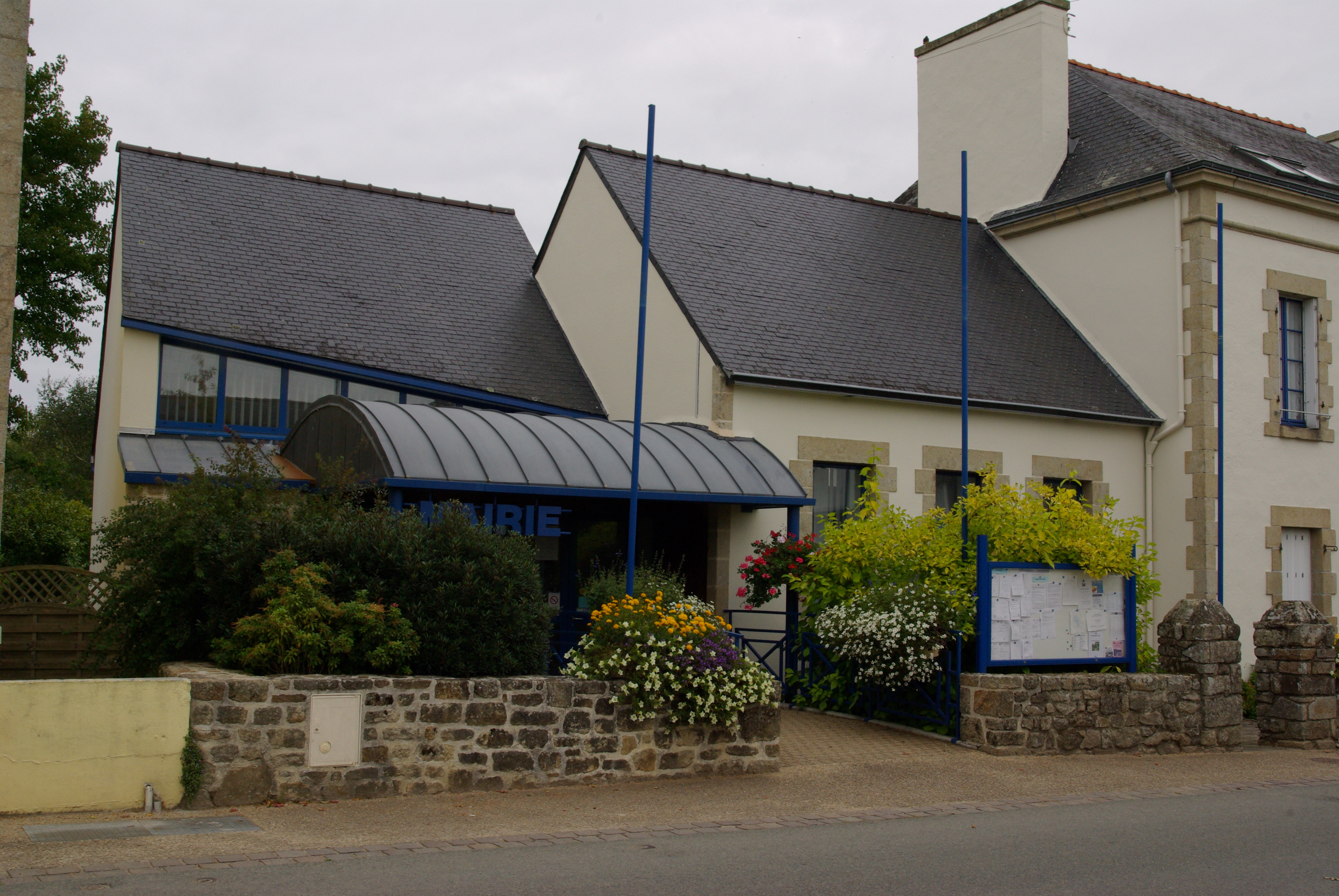
- The town hall in Le Juch

- Flag Coat of arms
- Location of Le Juch
- Location within France Location within Brittany
- Coordinates: 48°04′01″N 4°15′10″W
- Country: France
- Region: Brittany
- Department: Finistère
- Arrondissement: Quimper
- Canton: Douarnenez

Government
  - Mayor (2024–2026): Yves Tymen
- Area^{1}: 14.38 km^{2} (5.55 sq mi)
- Highest elevation: 158 m (518 ft)
- Lowest elevation: 8 m (26 ft)
- Population (2023): 765
  - Density: 53.2/km^{2} (138/sq mi)
- Time zone: UTC+01:00 (CET)
  - Summer (DST): UTC+02:00 (CEST)
- INSEE/Postal code: 29087 /29100
- ^{1} French Land Register data, which excludes lakes, ponds, glaciers > 1 km^{2} (0.386 sq mi or 247 acres) and river estuaries.

Le Juch (French pronunciation: [lə ʒyk]; Breton: Ar Yeuc'h) is a commune in the Finistère department and administrative region of Brittany in north-western France.

== Population ==
In French the inhabitants of Le Juch are known as Juchois.

== Breton language ==
The municipality launched a linguistic plan concerning the Breton language through Ya d'ar brezhoneg on 14 December 2005.

== See also ==
- Communes of the Finistère department
