= Heussaff =

- Pronunciation: pronounced [ˈøsã]

Origin
- Origin: France
- Meaning: Ushant
- Region of origin: Brittany

Other names
- Variant form: Heusaff

Heussaff or Heusaff is a surname, and may refer to:

Heussaff is a toponymic surname that derives from an old spelling for the isle of Ushant (Eusa in modern Breton). Like for the surname Le Hénaff or Gourcuff, the digraph -ff was introduced by Middle Ages' authors to indicate a nasalized vowel. In fact the modern orthography should be Heussañ.

- Alan Heusaff, also Alan Heussaff - Breton nationalist, linguist and dictionary compiler
- Solenn Heussaff - Filipino actress, model and singer
