= Confort-Meilars =

Confort-Meilars Koñforzh-Meilar
- Commune
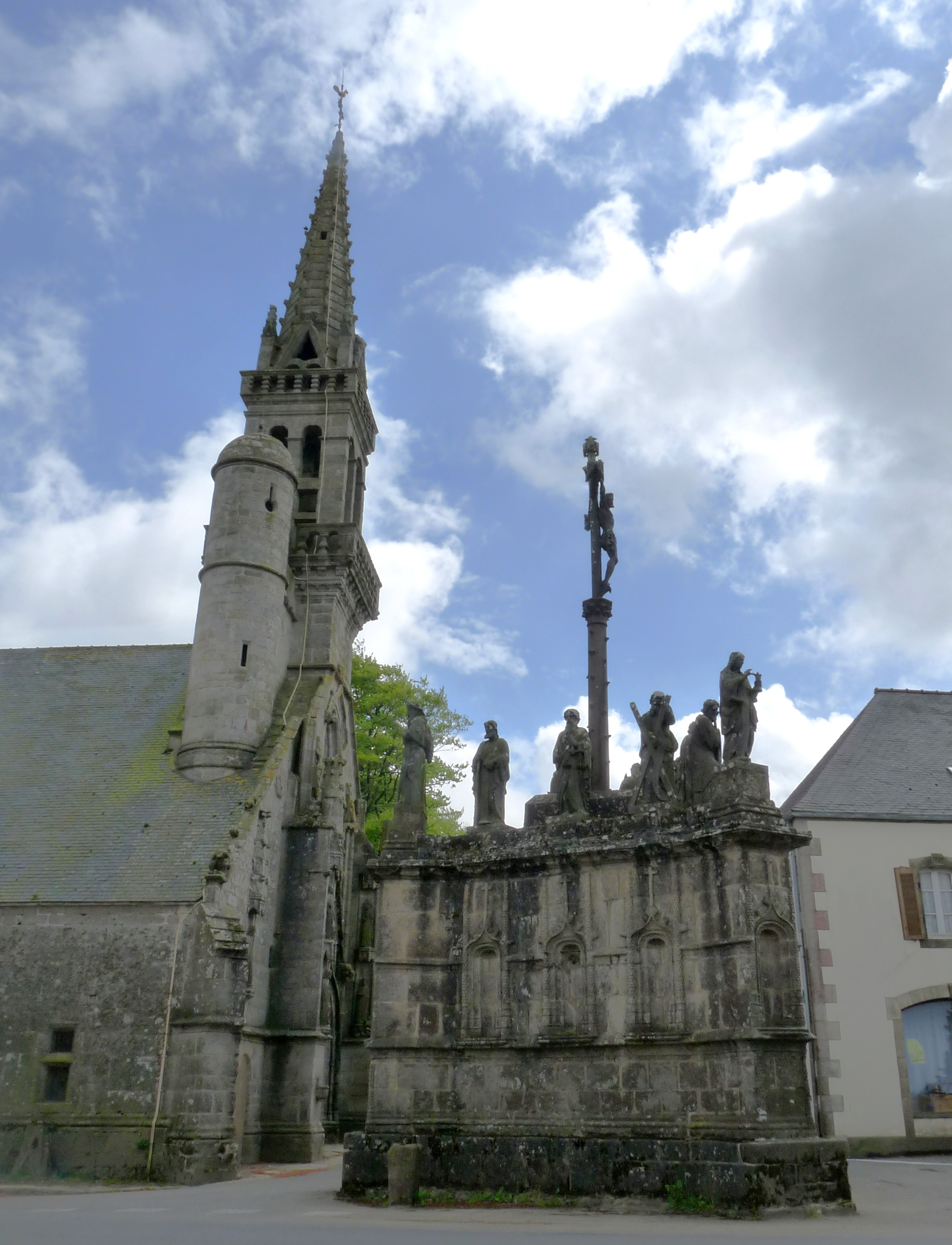
- The church of Our Lady and the calvary, in Confort-Meilars
- Location of Confort-Meilars
- Location within France Location within Brittany
- Coordinates: 48°03′02″N 4°25′30″W
- Country: France
- Region: Brittany
- Department: Finistère
- Arrondissement: Quimper
- Canton: Douarnenez
- Intercommunality: Cap Sizun - Pointe du Raz

Government
  - Mayor (2020–2026): Patrick Le Dreau
- Area^{1}: 14.68 km^{2} (5.67 sq mi)
- Highest elevation: 96 m (315 ft)
- Lowest elevation: 5 m (16 ft)
- Population (2023): 861
  - Density: 58.7/km^{2} (152/sq mi)
- Time zone: UTC+01:00 (CET)
  - Summer (DST): UTC+02:00 (CEST)
- INSEE/Postal code: 29145 /29790
- ^{1} French Land Register data, which excludes lakes, ponds, glaciers > 1 km^{2} (0.386 sq mi or 247 acres) and river estuaries.

Confort-Meilars (Breton: Koñforzh-Meilar, before 2001: Meilars) is a commune in the Finistère department of Brittany in north-western France.

== See also ==
- Communes of the Finistère department
- Yann Larhantec
- List of the works of the Maître de Plougastel
