= Goulien =

Goulien Goulien
- Commune
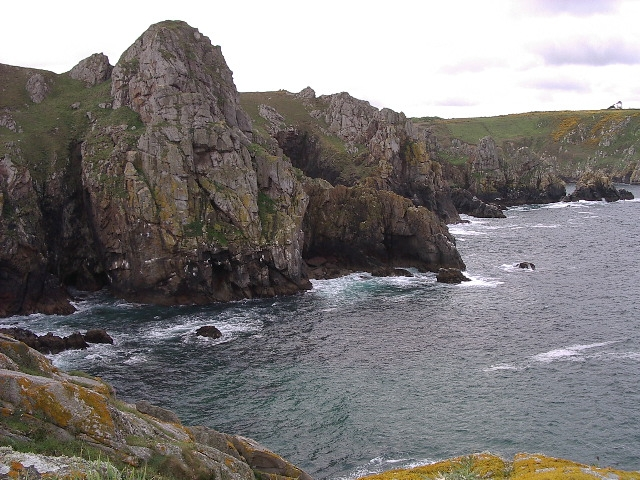
- Cliffs near Goulien
- Location of Goulien
- Location within France Location within Brittany
- Coordinates: 48°03′27″N 4°35′29″W
- Country: France
- Region: Brittany
- Department: Finistère
- Arrondissement: Quimper
- Canton: Douarnenez
- Intercommunality: Cap Sizun - Pointe du Raz

Government
  - Mayor (2020–2026): Henri Goardon
- Area^{1}: 12.77 km^{2} (4.93 sq mi)
- Highest elevation: 97 m (318 ft)
- Lowest elevation: 0 m (0 ft)
- Population (2023): 446
  - Density: 34.9/km^{2} (90.5/sq mi)
- Time zone: UTC+01:00 (CET)
  - Summer (DST): UTC+02:00 (CEST)
- INSEE/Postal code: 29063 /29770
- ^{1} French Land Register data, which excludes lakes, ponds, glaciers > 1 km^{2} (0.386 sq mi or 247 acres) and river estuaries.

Goulien (French pronunciation: [ɡuljɛ̃]; Breton: Goulien) is a commune in the Finistère department of Brittany in north-western France.

== Population ==
Inhabitants of Goulien are called in French Goulienois.

== See also ==
- Communes of the Finistère department
