= Primelin =

Primelin Prevel
- Commune
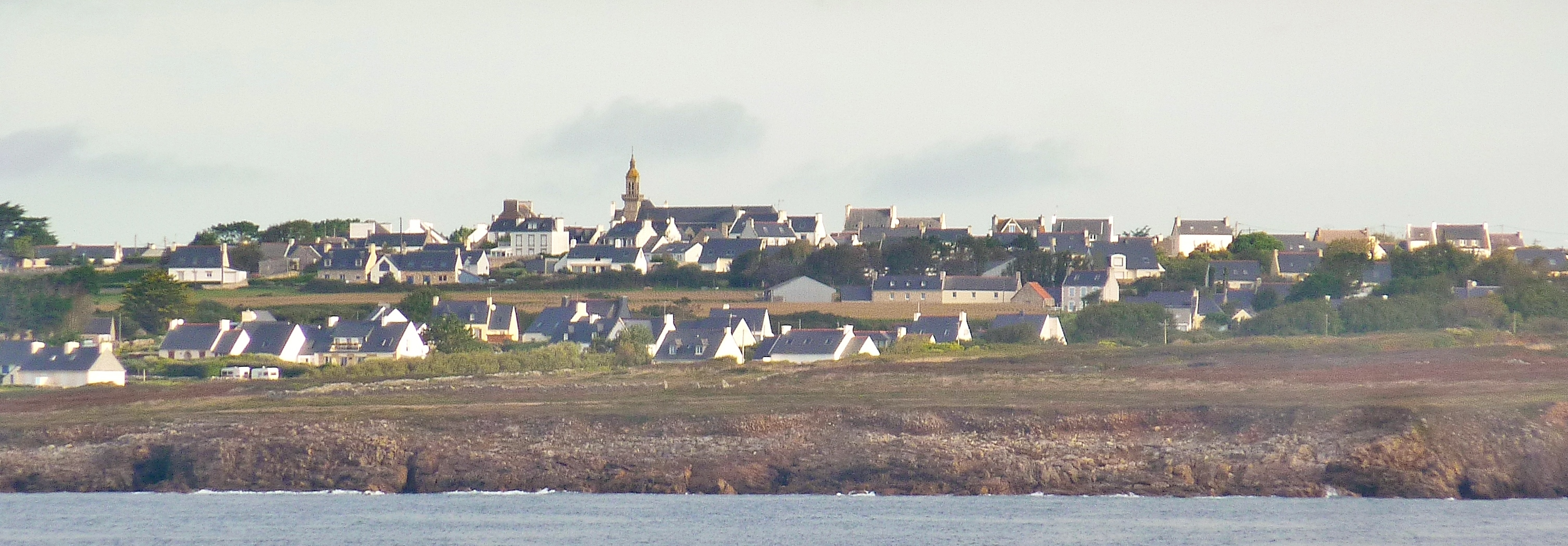
- Primelin seen from the sea

- Coat of arms
- Location of Primelin
- Location within France Location within Brittany
- Coordinates: 48°01′35″N 4°36′36″W
- Country: France
- Region: Brittany
- Department: Finistère
- Arrondissement: Quimper
- Canton: Douarnenez
- Intercommunality: Cap Sizun - Pointe du Raz

Government
  - Mayor (2020–2026): Alain Donnart
- Area^{1}: 8.67 km^{2} (3.35 sq mi)
- Highest elevation: 59 m (194 ft)
- Lowest elevation: 0 m (0 ft)
- Population (2023): 650
  - Density: 75/km^{2} (190/sq mi)
- Time zone: UTC+01:00 (CET)
  - Summer (DST): UTC+02:00 (CEST)
- INSEE/Postal code: 29228 /29770
- ^{1} French Land Register data, which excludes lakes, ponds, glaciers > 1 km^{2} (0.386 sq mi or 247 acres) and river estuaries.

Primelin (French pronunciation: [pʁimlɛ̃]; Breton: Prevel) is a commune in the Finistère department of Brittany in north-western France. Inhabitants of Primelin are called in French Primelinois.

== International relations ==
It is twinned with the Cornish village of Mabe.

== See also ==
- Communes of the Finistère department
- List of the works of the Maître de Plougastel
