= Mahalon =

Mahalon Mahalon
- Commune
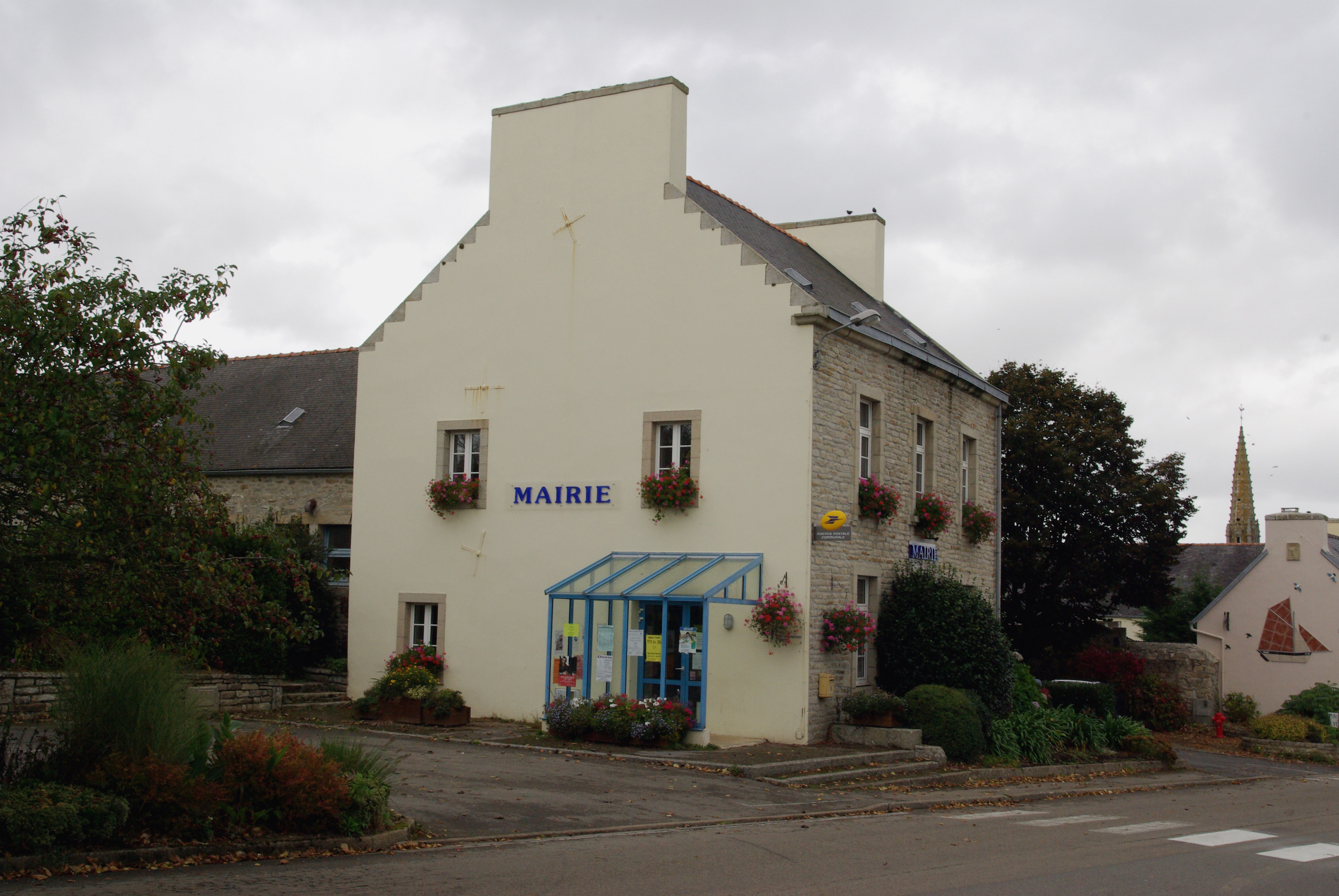
- The town hall and post office in Mahalon
- Location of Mahalon
- Location within France Location within Brittany
- Coordinates: 48°02′08″N 4°26′06″W
- Country: France
- Region: Brittany
- Department: Finistère
- Arrondissement: Quimper
- Canton: Douarnenez
- Intercommunality: Cap Sizun - Pointe du Raz

Government
  - Mayor (2020–2026): Bernard Le Gall
- Area^{1}: 21.39 km^{2} (8.26 sq mi)
- Highest elevation: 101 m (331 ft)
- Lowest elevation: 2 m (6.6 ft)
- Population (2023): 1,021
  - Density: 47.73/km^{2} (123.6/sq mi)
- Time zone: UTC+01:00 (CET)
  - Summer (DST): UTC+02:00 (CEST)
- INSEE/Postal code: 29143 /29790
- ^{1} French Land Register data, which excludes lakes, ponds, glaciers > 1 km^{2} (0.386 sq mi or 247 acres) and river estuaries.

Mahalon (French pronunciation: [ma.alɔ̃]; Breton: Mahalon) is a commune in the Finistère department of Brittany in north-western France.

== Population ==
Inhabitants of Mahalon are called in French Mahalonnais.

== See also ==
- Communes of the Finistère department
