= Coray, Finistère =

Coray Kore
- Commune
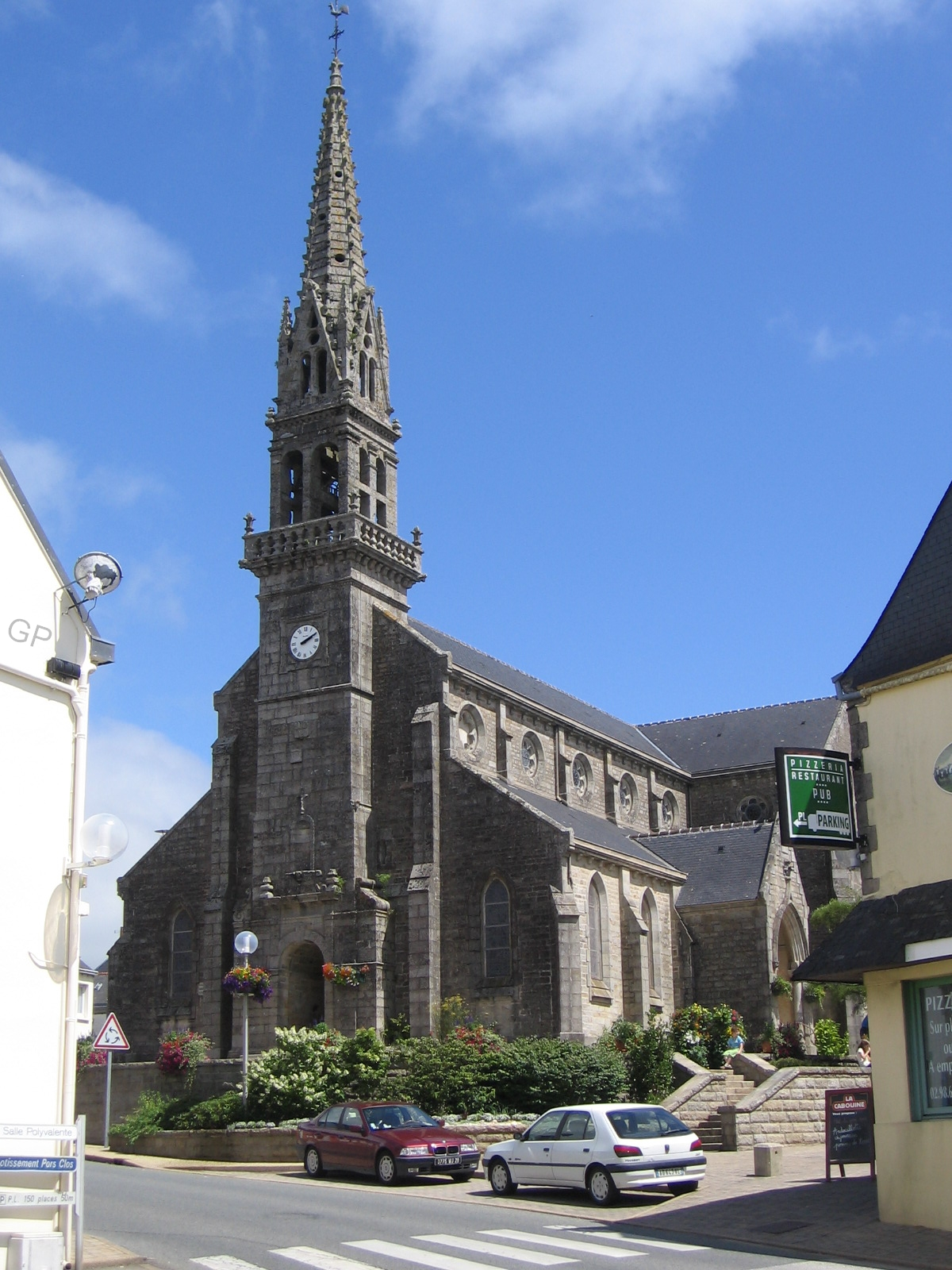
- The church in Coray

- Coat of arms
- Location of Coray
- Location within France Location within Brittany
- Coordinates: 48°03′43″N 3°49′43″W
- Country: France
- Region: Brittany
- Department: Finistère
- Arrondissement: Châteaulin
- Canton: Briec
- Intercommunality: Haute Cornouaille

Government
  - Mayor (2020–2026): Joëlle Le Bihan
- Area^{1}: 31.36 km^{2} (12.11 sq mi)
- Highest elevation: 257 m (843 ft)
- Lowest elevation: 75 m (246 ft)
- Population (2023): 1,856
  - Density: 59.18/km^{2} (153.3/sq mi)
- Time zone: UTC+01:00 (CET)
  - Summer (DST): UTC+02:00 (CEST)
- INSEE/Postal code: 29041 /29370
- ^{1} French Land Register data, which excludes lakes, ponds, glaciers > 1 km^{2} (0.386 sq mi or 247 acres) and river estuaries.

Coray (French pronunciation: [kɔʁɛ]; Breton: Kore) is a commune in the Finistère department of Brittany in north-western France.

It lies on the river Odet.

== Geography ==
=== Climate ===
Coray has an oceanic climate (Köppen climate classification Cfb). The average annual temperature in Coray is 11.1 °C (52.0 °F). The average annual rainfall is 1,397.1 mm (55.00 in) with January as the wettest month. The temperatures are highest on average in August, at around 17.3 °C (63.1 °F), and lowest in January, at around 5.6 °C (42.1 °F). The highest temperature ever recorded in Coray was 35.9 °C (96.6 °F) on 9 August 2003; the coldest temperature ever recorded was −10.7 °C (12.7 °F) on 2 January 1997.

Climate data for Coray (1981–2010 averages, extremes 1990−present)
Month	Jan	Feb	Mar	Apr	May	Jun	Jul	Aug	Sep	Oct	Nov	Dec	Year
Record high °C (°F)	14.5 (58.1)	20.0 (68.0)	22.8 (73.0)	28.2 (82.8)	29.9 (85.8)	32.9 (91.2)	33.8 (92.8)	35.9 (96.6)	30.0 (86.0)	27.5 (81.5)	20.5 (68.9)	16.9 (62.4)	35.9 (96.6)
Mean daily maximum °C (°F)	8.3 (46.9)	9.1 (48.4)	11.5 (52.7)	13.6 (56.5)	17.1 (62.8)	20.2 (68.4)	21.6 (70.9)	21.9 (71.4)	19.4 (66.9)	15.3 (59.5)	11.4 (52.5)	8.6 (47.5)	14.9 (58.8)
Daily mean °C (°F)	5.6 (42.1)	6.0 (42.8)	7.9 (46.2)	9.4 (48.9)	12.7 (54.9)	15.5 (59.9)	17.1 (62.8)	17.3 (63.1)	15.1 (59.2)	12.0 (53.6)	8.5 (47.3)	5.8 (42.4)	11.1 (52.0)
Mean daily minimum °C (°F)	3.0 (37.4)	2.8 (37.0)	4.3 (39.7)	5.2 (41.4)	8.4 (47.1)	10.8 (51.4)	12.7 (54.9)	12.8 (55.0)	10.7 (51.3)	8.7 (47.7)	5.6 (42.1)	3.1 (37.6)	7.4 (45.3)
Record low °C (°F)	−10.7 (12.7)	−10.2 (13.6)	−5.3 (22.5)	−1.5 (29.3)	0.0 (32.0)	3.8 (38.8)	6.4 (43.5)	5.3 (41.5)	2.9 (37.2)	−1.0 (30.2)	−4.6 (23.7)	−7.7 (18.1)	−10.7 (12.7)
Average precipitation mm (inches)	166.8 (6.57)	128.9 (5.07)	99.3 (3.91)	102.1 (4.02)	93.1 (3.67)	64.7 (2.55)	82.4 (3.24)	83.0 (3.27)	99.9 (3.93)	149.9 (5.90)	166.0 (6.54)	161.0 (6.34)	1,397.1 (55.00)
Average precipitation days (≥ 1.0 mm)	16.7	13.5	13.8	13.3	11.5	8.9	12.1	10.0	10.7	15.5	17.2	16.4	159.6
Source: Meteociel

== Population ==
Inhabitants of Coray are called in French Corayens.

Historical population

Year	Pop.	±% p.a.
1793	1,272	—
1800	1,488	+2.27%
1806	1,227	−3.16%
1821	1,443	+1.09%
1831	1,640	+1.29%
1836	1,847	+2.41%
1841	1,834	−0.14%
1846	1,809	−0.27%
1851	1,976	+1.78%
1856	1,855	−1.26%
1861	1,992	+1.44%
1866	2,139	+1.43%
1872	2,076	−0.50%
1876	2,275	+2.31%
1881	2,410	+1.16%
1886	2,532	+0.99%
1891	2,572	+0.31%
1896	2,565	−0.05%
1901	2,760	+1.48%

Year	Pop.	±% p.a.
1906	2,705	−0.40%
1911	2,752	+0.35%
1921	2,445	−1.18%
1926	2,366	−0.65%
1931	2,189	−1.54%
1936	2,127	−0.57%
1946	2,049	−0.37%
1954	2,006	−0.26%
1962	1,841	−1.07%
1968	1,787	−0.49%
1975	1,768	−0.15%
1982	1,737	−0.25%
1990	1,623	−0.84%
1999	1,625	+0.01%
2007	1,778	+1.13%
2012	1,888	+1.21%
2017	1,896	+0.08%
2023	1,856	−0.35%

Source: EHESS and INSEE (1968-2023)

== Map ==
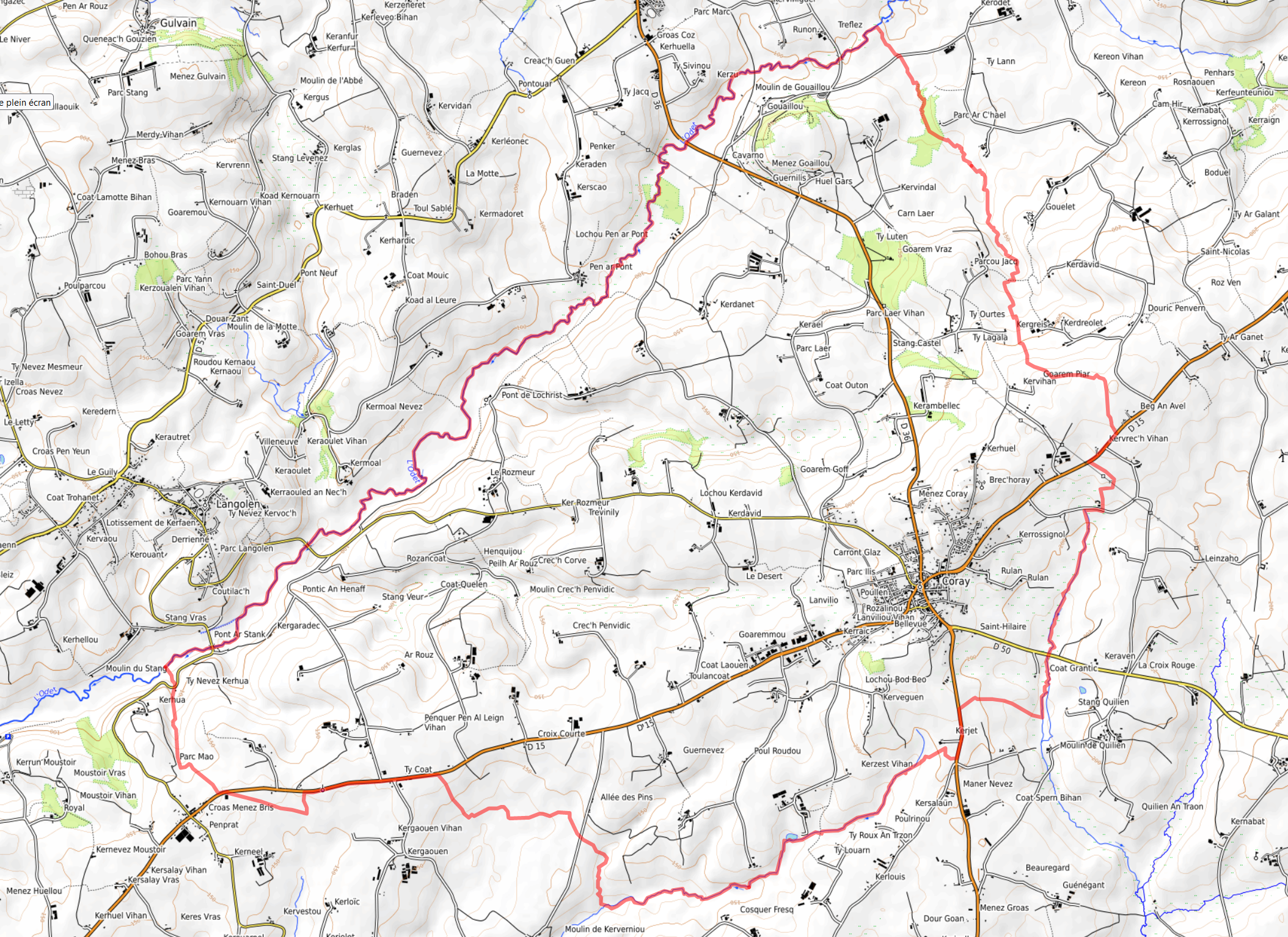
Topographic map

== See also ==
- Communes of the Finistère department
