= Plouhinec, Finistère =

Plouhinec Ploeneg
- Commune
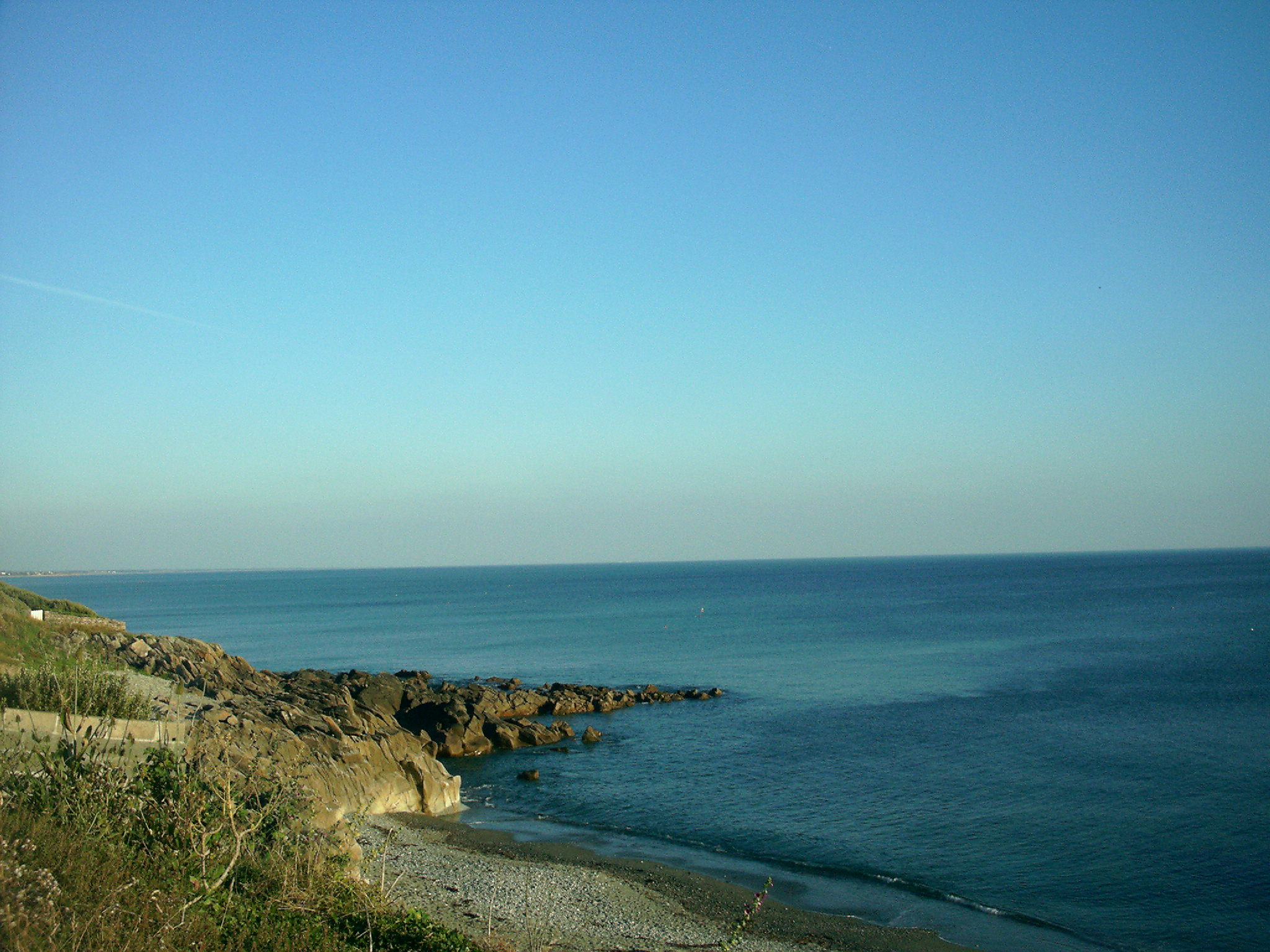
- Bay of Pors Poulhan - Harbour of Plouhinec

- Coat of arms
- Location of Plouhinec
- Location within France Location within Brittany
- Coordinates: 48°00′51″N 4°29′11″W
- Country: France
- Region: Brittany
- Department: Finistère
- Arrondissement: Quimper
- Canton: Douarnenez
- Intercommunality: Cap Sizun - Pointe du Raz

Government
  - Mayor (2020–2026): Yvan Moullec
- Area^{1}: 28.05 km^{2} (10.83 sq mi)
- Highest elevation: 104 m (341 ft)
- Lowest elevation: 0 m (0 ft)
- Population (2023): 3,919
  - Density: 139.7/km^{2} (361.9/sq mi)
- Time zone: UTC+01:00 (CET)
  - Summer (DST): UTC+02:00 (CEST)
- INSEE/Postal code: 29197 /29780
- ^{1} French Land Register data, which excludes lakes, ponds, glaciers > 1 km^{2} (0.386 sq mi or 247 acres) and river estuaries.

Plouhinec (French pronunciation: [pluinɛk]; Breton: Ploeneg) is a commune in the Finistère department of Brittany in north-western France.

The commune lies on the road from Pont-l'Abbé to Audierne.

Landmarks in the town include the Saint-Winoc Church, which dates from the sixteenth century, and the scenic, small natural port of the borough of Pors-Poulhan.

The village contains sculptures by locally born artist René Quillivic.

== Population ==
Historical population

Year	Pop.	±% p.a.
1793	1,854	—
1800	1,792	−0.48%
1806	1,826	+0.31%
1821	2,304	+1.56%
1831	2,579	+1.13%
1836	2,732	+1.16%
1841	2,815	+0.60%
1846	3,014	+1.38%
1851	3,052	+0.25%
1856	3,190	+0.89%
1861	3,378	+1.15%
1866	3,736	+2.04%
1872	3,744	+0.04%
1876	4,023	+1.81%
1881	4,262	+1.16%
1886	4,596	+1.52%
1891	4,921	+1.38%
1896	5,507	+2.28%
1901	6,042	+1.87%

Year	Pop.	±% p.a.
1906	6,435	+1.27%
1911	6,512	+0.24%
1921	6,549	+0.06%
1926	6,783	+0.70%
1931	6,738	−0.13%
1936	6,573	−0.49%
1946	6,219	−0.55%
1954	6,319	+0.20%
1962	6,036	−0.57%
1968	5,792	−0.69%
1975	5,361	−1.10%
1982	4,900	−1.28%
1990	4,524	−0.99%
1999	4,106	−1.07%
2007	4,215	+0.33%
2012	4,107	−0.52%
2017	3,975	−0.65%
2023	3,919	−0.24%

Source: EHESS and INSEE (1968-2023)

== Gallery ==
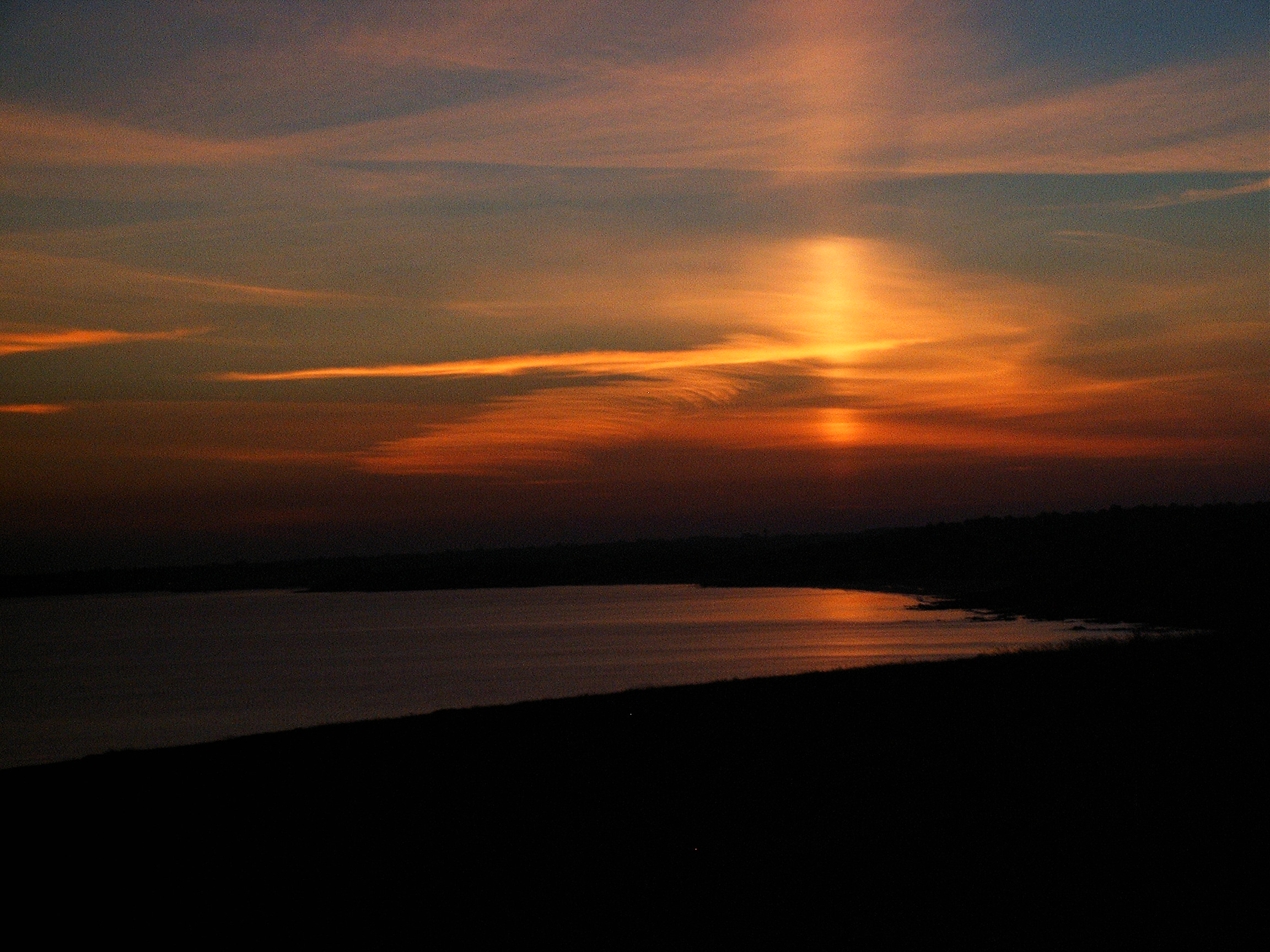
Sunset on the Plouhinec beach.

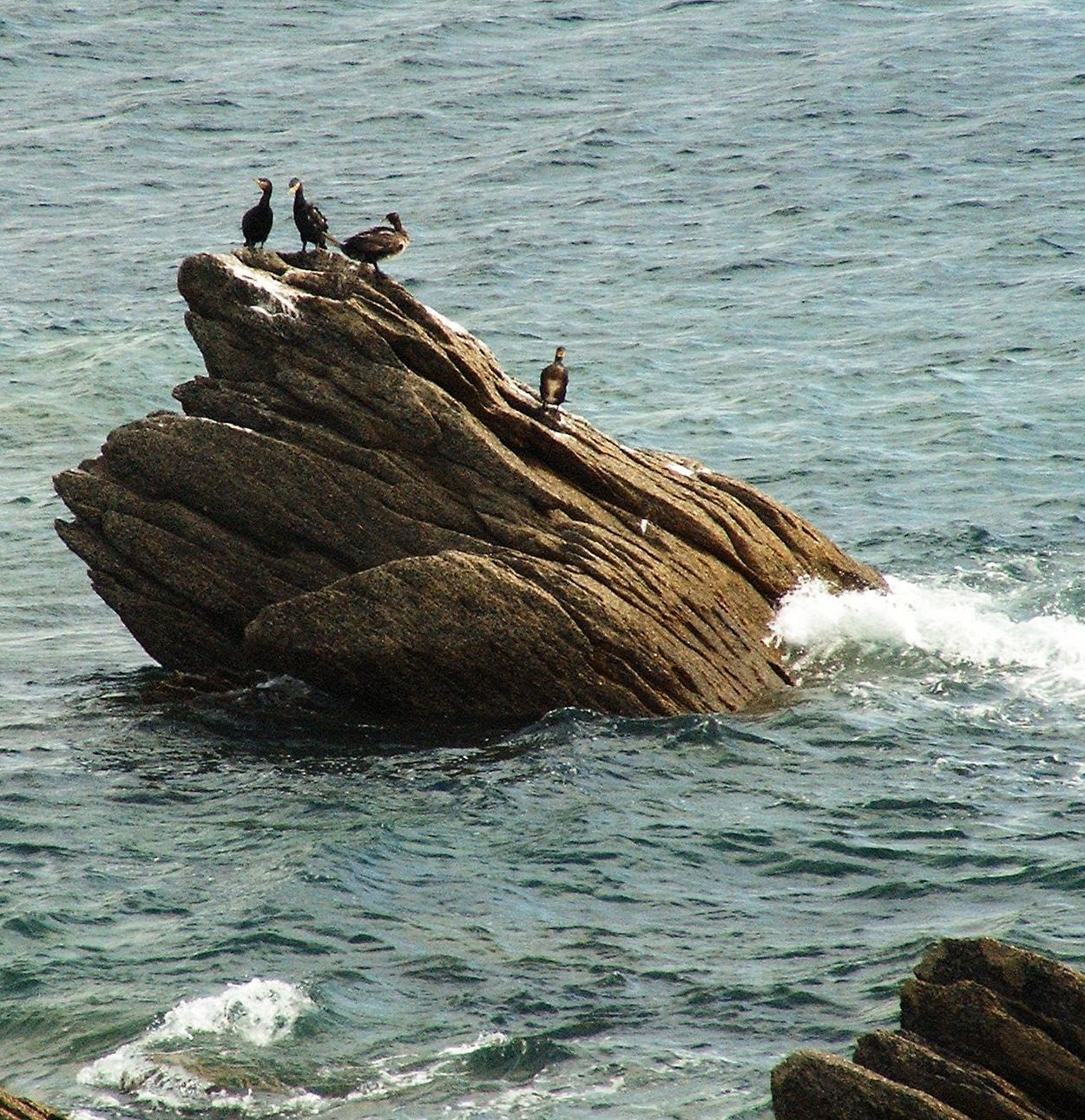
Cormorants at the Harbour of Pors-Poulhan.

== See also ==
- Communes of the Finistère department
