= Guiscriff =

Commune in Brittany, France

Guiscriff Gwiskri
- Commune
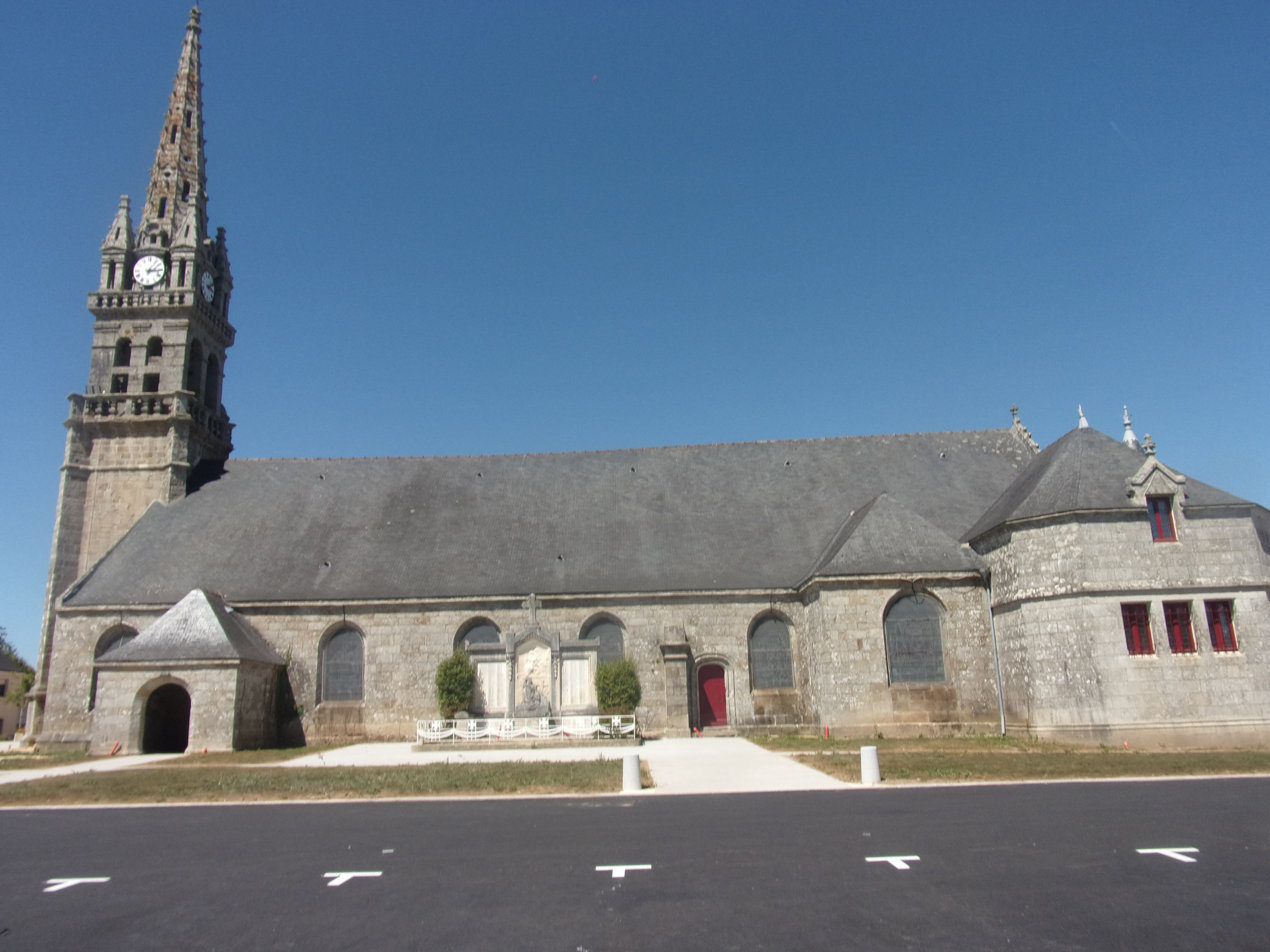
- The parish church in Guiscriff
- Location of Guiscriff
- Location within France Location within Brittany
- Coordinates: 48°03′02″N 3°38′39″W
- Country: France
- Region: Brittany
- Department: Morbihan
- Arrondissement: Pontivy
- Canton: Gourin
- Intercommunality: Roi Morvan Communauté

Government
  - Mayor (2026–32): Renée Courtel
- Area^{1}: 85.46 km^{2} (33.00 sq mi)
- Highest elevation: 237 m (778 ft)
- Lowest elevation: 70 m (230 ft)
- Population (2023): 2,037
  - Density: 23.84/km^{2} (61.73/sq mi)
- Time zone: UTC+01:00 (CET)
  - Summer (DST): UTC+02:00 (CEST)
- INSEE/Postal code: 56081 /56560
- ^{1} French Land Register data, which excludes lakes, ponds, glaciers > 1 km^{2} (0.386 sq mi or 247 acres) and river estuaries.

Guiscriff (French pronunciation: [ɡiskʁif]; Breton: Gwiskri) is a commune in the Morbihan department in Brittany in north-western France.

== Population ==
Inhabitants of Guiscriff are called Guiscrivites. Guiscriff's population peaked at 5,896 in 1921 and declined to 2,037 in 2023. This represents a 65% decrease in total population since the peak census figure.

Historical population

| Year | Pop. | ±% p.a. |
|---|---|---|
| 1793 | 2,786 | — |
| 1800 | 2,695 | −0.47% |
| 1806 | 2,500 | −1.24% |
| 1831 | 2,786 | +0.43% |
| 1836 | 3,153 | +2.51% |
| 1841 | 3,016 | −0.88% |
| 1846 | 3,418 | +2.53% |
| 1851 | 3,570 | +0.87% |
| 1856 | 3,396 | −0.99% |
| 1861 | 3,452 | +0.33% |
| 1866 | 3,531 | +0.45% |
| 1872 | 3,558 | +0.13% |
| 1876 | 3,724 | +1.15% |
| 1881 | 3,754 | +0.16% |
| 1886 | 3,894 | +0.73% |
| 1891 | 4,330 | +2.15% |
| 1896 | 4,594 | +1.19% |
| 1901 | 4,060 | −2.44% |

| Year | Pop. | ±% p.a. |
|---|---|---|
| 1906 | 4,972 | +4.14% |
| 1911 | 5,380 | +1.59% |
| 1921 | 5,896 | +0.92% |
| 1926 | 5,525 | −1.29% |
| 1931 | 5,182 | −1.27% |
| 1936 | 5,063 | −0.46% |
| 1946 | 5,034 | −0.06% |
| 1954 | 4,222 | −2.17% |
| 1962 | 3,740 | −1.50% |
| 1968 | 3,377 | −1.69% |
| 1975 | 2,931 | −2.00% |
| 1982 | 2,734 | −0.99% |
| 1990 | 2,529 | −0.97% |
| 1999 | 2,394 | −0.61% |
| 2007 | 2,328 | −0.35% |
| 2012 | 2,374 | +0.39% |
| 2017 | 2,088 | −2.53% |
| 2023 | 2,037 | −0.41% |

Source: EHESS and INSEE (1968–2023)

== Geography ==
Historically, the village belongs to Cornouaille. The village centre is located 21 km (13 mi) north of Quimperlé and 35 km (22 mi) east of Quimper.

== History ==
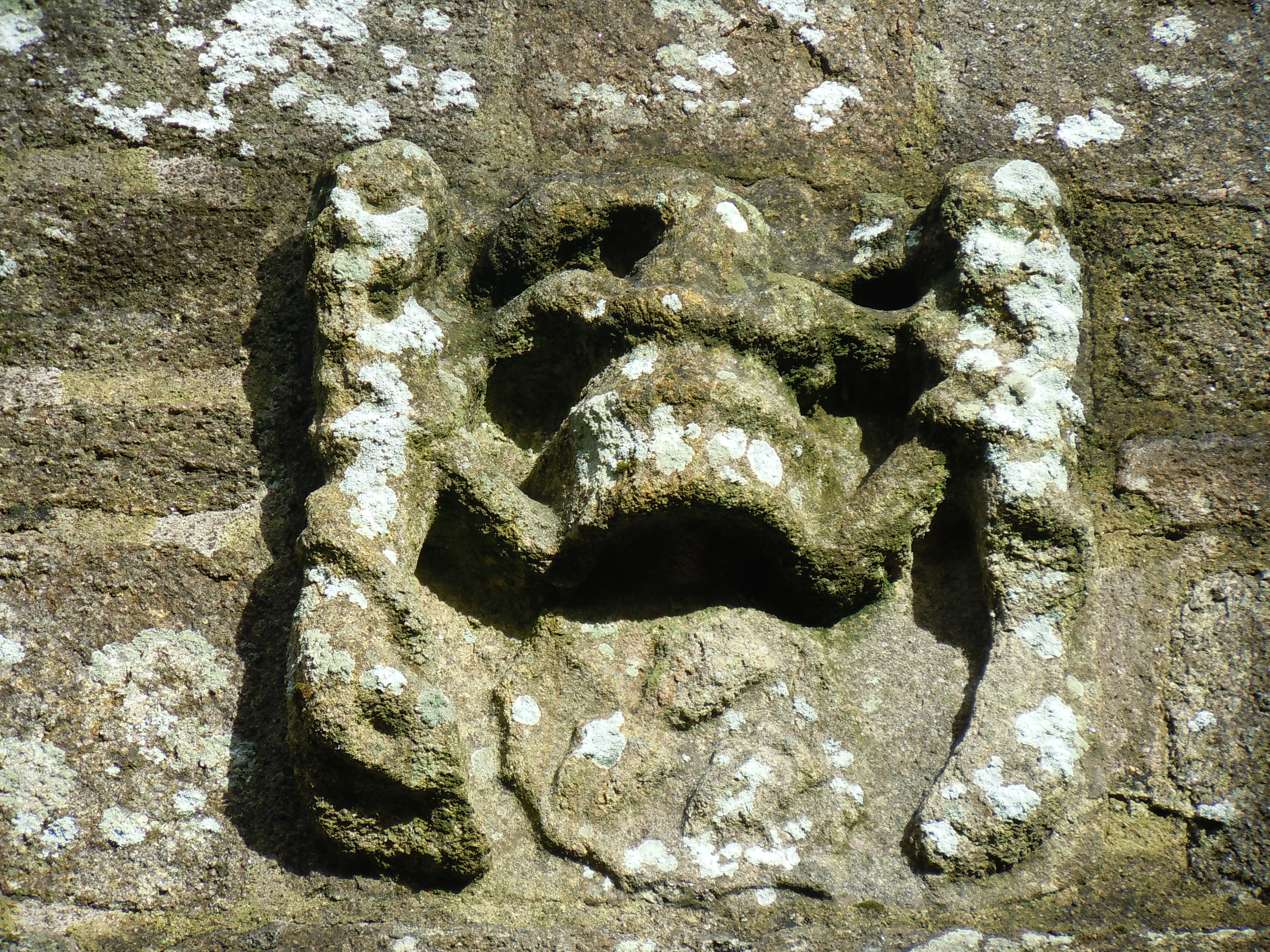
Coat of arms of the Toultenoutre, lords of Penehoc in Guiscriff.

== Gallery ==
=== Church and chapels ===
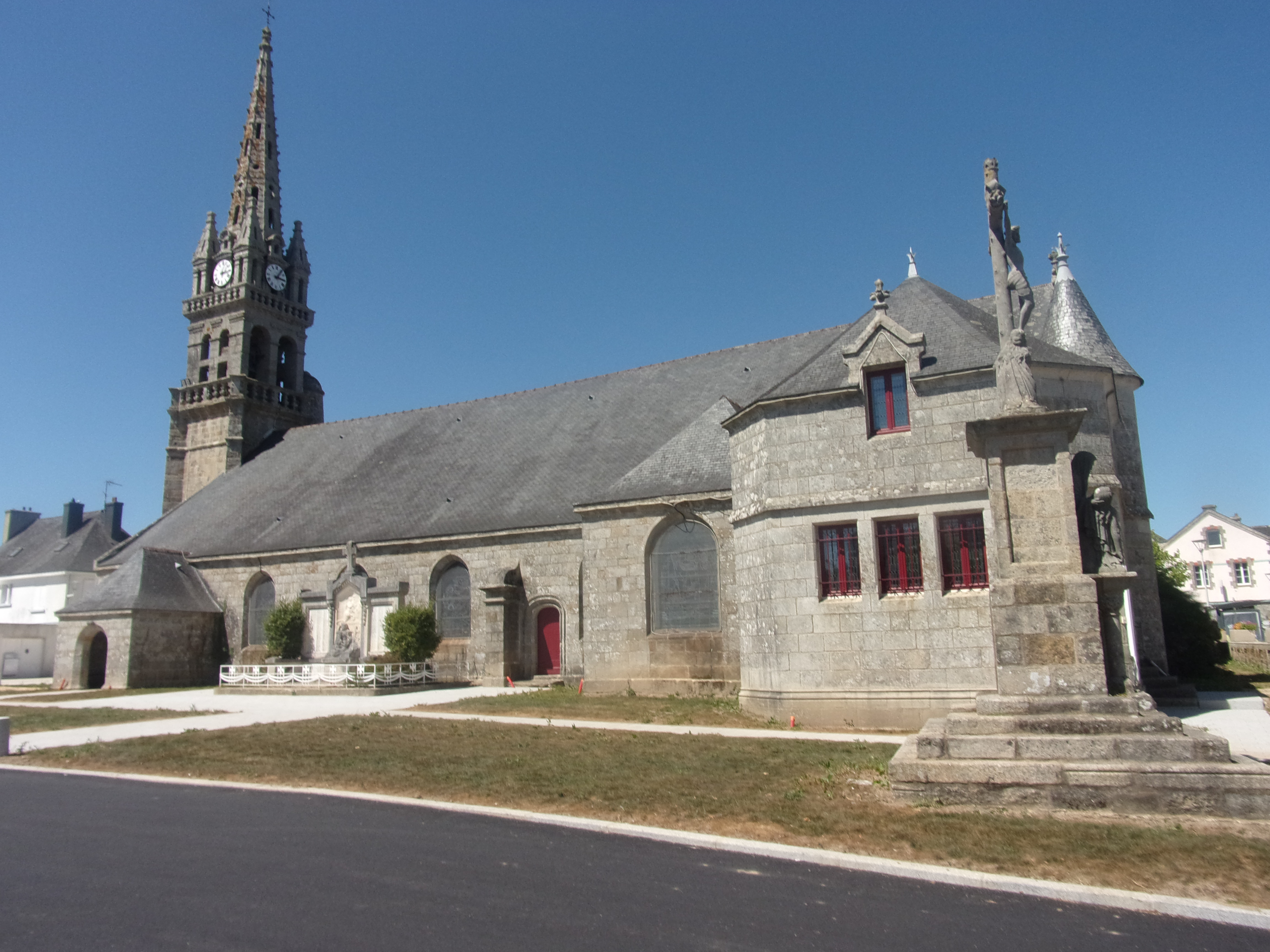
The parish church

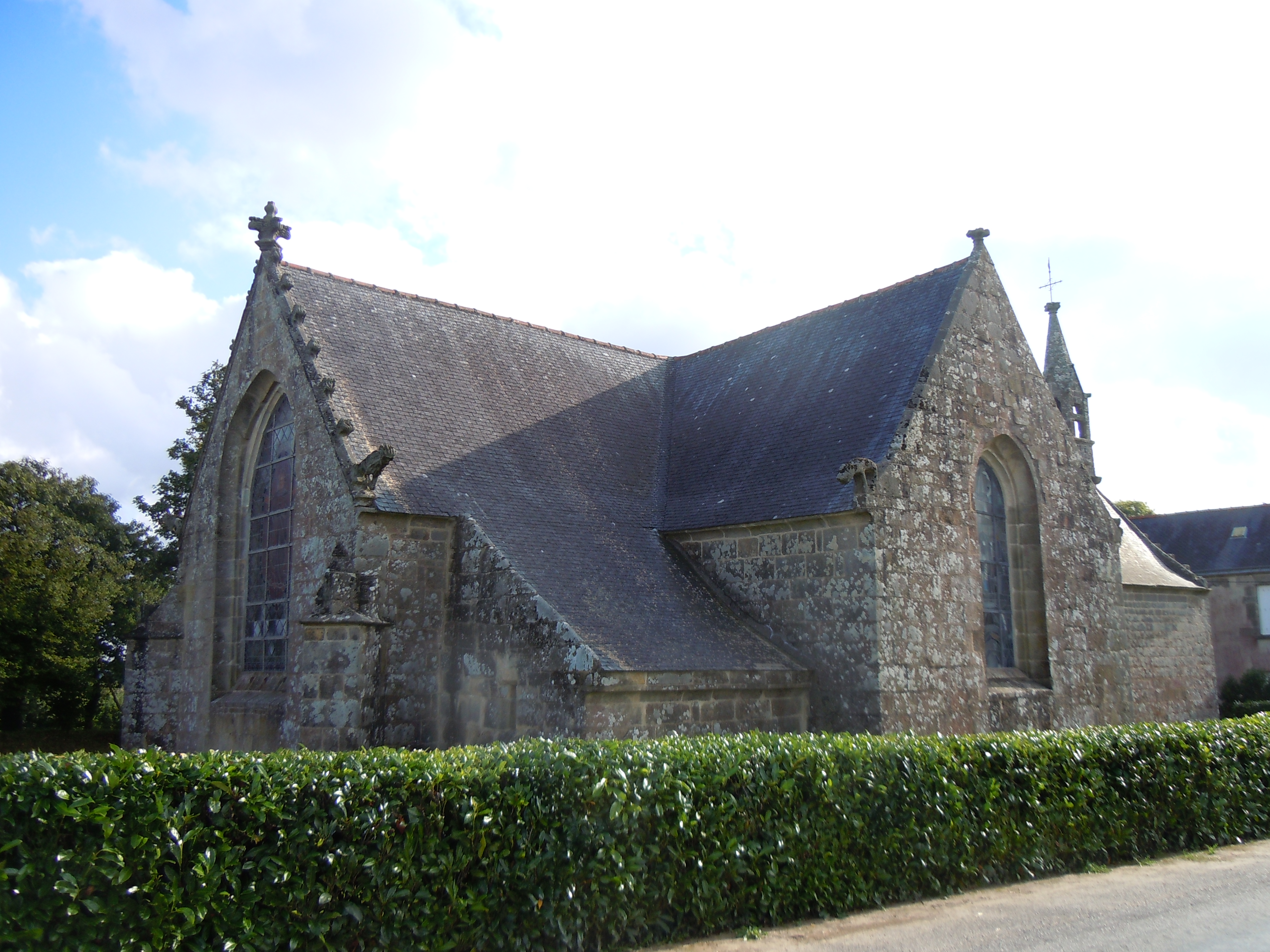
Chapel Saint Maudé

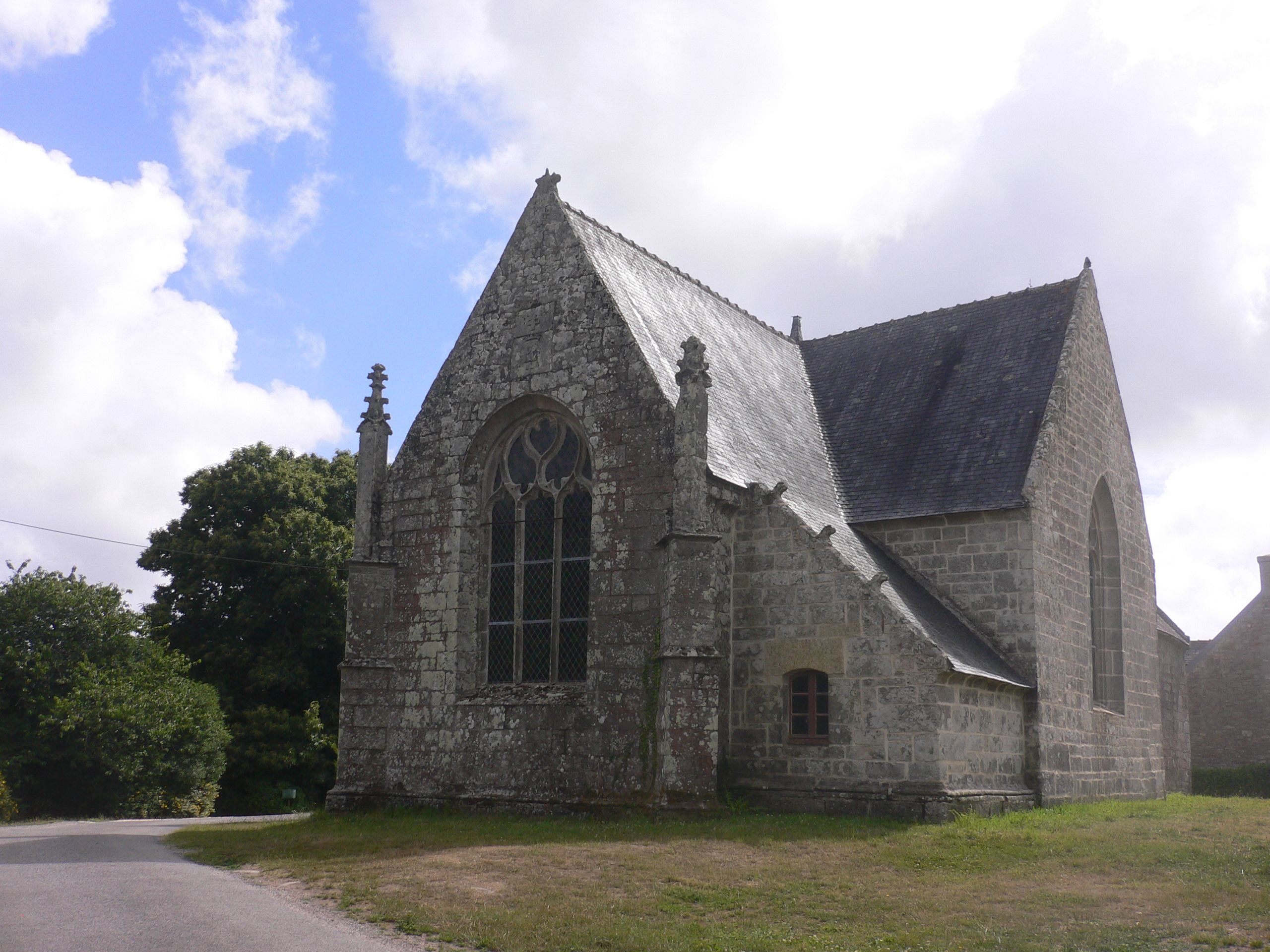
Chapel Saint Eloi

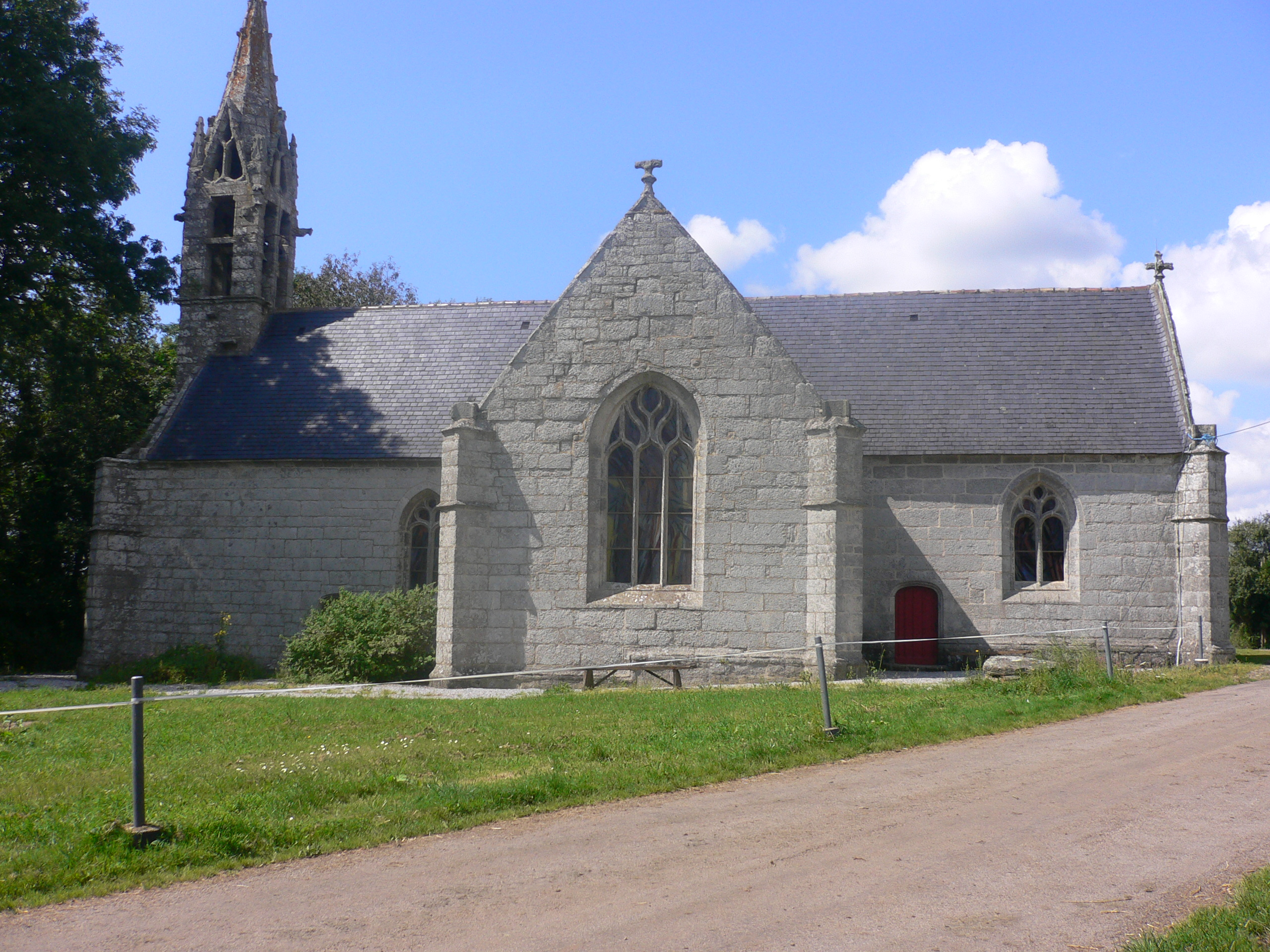
Chapel Saint Antoine

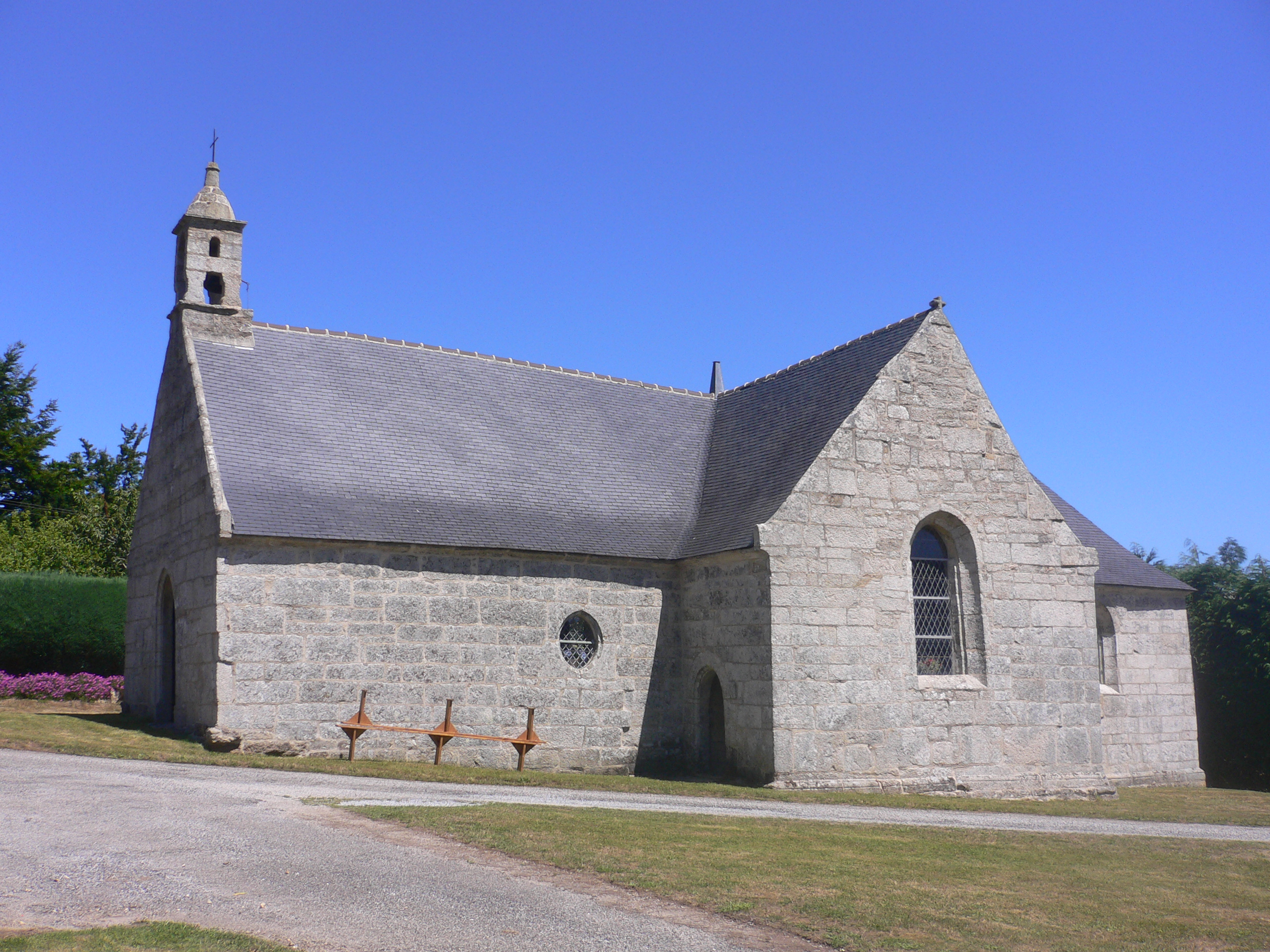
Chapel Saint Tugdual

== See also ==
- Communes of the Morbihan department
