= Le Hénaff =

- Pronunciation: pronounced [lø ˈhenːã]

Origin
- Origin: Breton
- Meaning: the elder
- Region of origin: Brittany

Other names
- Variant forms: Hénaf, Hénanff, Hénaph, Le Hénan, Le Hénand, Le Hénanf, Le Hénanff, Le Hénauff

Le Hénaff (modern orthography Le Hénañ) is a surname of Breton origin meaning the elder. Like for the surname Heussaff or Gourcuff, the digraph -ff was introduced by Middle Ages' authors to indicate a nasalized vowel. It may refer to any the following people:

- Anne Le Hénanff (born 1969), French politician
- René Le Hénaff (1901-2005), French film editor and director
- Cédric Le Hénaff (born 1984), French football player
- Yves Le Hénaff (1914–1944), French resistant

== See also ==
- Jean-Jacques Hénaff, French CEO of a Pâté company
- Eugène Hénaff (1904-1966), French politician
- Jeannine Henaff (born 1936), French electrical engineer
- Marcel Hénaff (1942-2018), French philosopher and anthropologist
- Goulwena an Henaff, French TV presenter
