= Gourcuff =

- Pronunciation: pronounced [ˈɡuːʁkỹ]

Origin
- Origin: Breton
- Meaning: the charming man
- Region of origin: Brittany

Gourcuff or Gourkuñv also associated to Corcuff is a surname, and may refer to:

Gourkuñv derives from gour and kuñv which means a charming, affable, gentle or conciliatory man in Breton. Like for the surname Henaff, the digraph -ff was introduced by Middle Ages' authors to indicate a nasalized vowel. In fact the modern orthography should be Gourkuñ.

- Christian Gourcuff (born 1955), French football manager
- Guillaume de Gourcuff, Breton noble who participated in the Sixth Crusade. His name is mentioned in the third Salle des Croisades.
- Laurent de Gourcuff (born 1976 or 1977), French businessman
- Marguerite de Gourcuff aka Daisy de Galard, French journalist
- Yoann Gourcuff (born 1986), French footballer

== See also ==
- Le Cunff
