= Bigouden =

Region in southwestern Brittany

Coordinates: 47.8672°N 4.2231°W

Flag of Pays Bigouden

Bigouden (Breton: Bro-Vigoudenn; French: Pays Bigouden), historically known as Cap Caval, is the most south-western area of Bro Kernev in Brittany, south-west of Quimper, along the Bay of Audierne, part of the French department of Finistère since 1790. The designation was an informal label taken from the name of the distinctive headdress traditionally worn by the local women. By the end of the 19th century, the name then slipped to designate the women of the area, then to describe all its inhabitants. It has since been formalised within the administration and promotion of the region.

== Geography ==
This traditional is grouped into three cantons: Guilvinec, Pont-l'Abbé and Plogastel-Saint-Germain. Its capital is Pont-l'Abbé. The Bigouden is currently divided into two communities of communes: Communauté de communes du Pays Bigouden Sud and Communauté de communes du Haut Pays Bigouden. Some recent debates put forward the question of joining these two entities.

- Canton de Guilvinec
  - Guilvinec
  - Treffiagat
  - Loctudy
  - Penmarc’h
  - Plobannalec-Lesconil
- Canton de Pont-l’Abbé
  - Combrit Sainte-Marine
  - Île-Tudy
  - Plomeur
  - Pont-l’Abbé
  - Saint-Jean-Trolimon
  - Tréguennec
  - Tréméoc
- Canton de Plogastel-Saint-Germain
  - Landudec
  - Peumerit
  - Plogastel-Saint-Germain
  - Plovan
  - Plozévet
  - Plonéour-Lanvern
  - Pouldreuzic
  - Tréogat

== Cultural distinctiveness ==
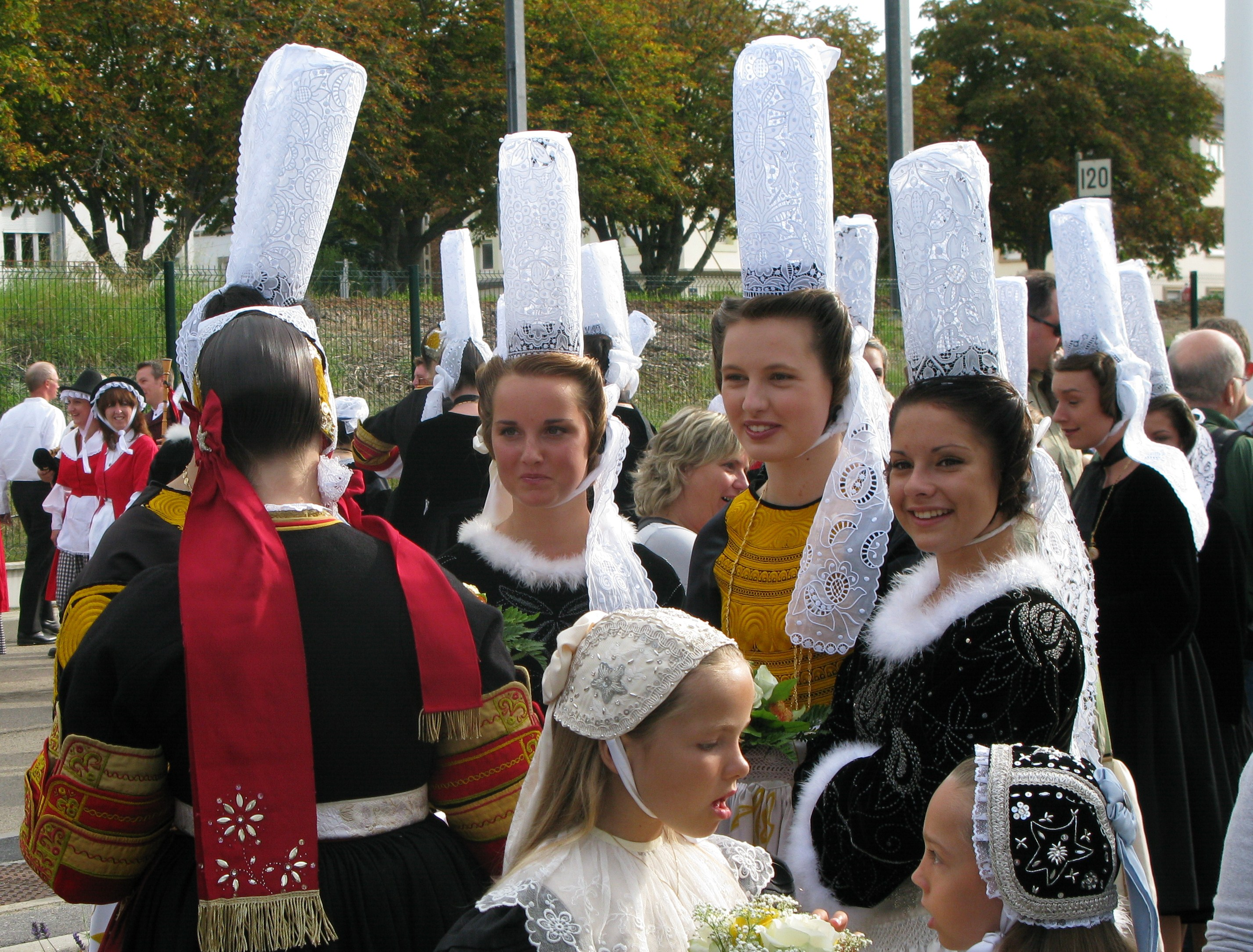
A group of bigoudènes wearing the distinctive Bigouden headdress.

The distinctive customs and costumes of the area have attracted artists and ethnologists since the late eighteenth century, leading to some idiosyncratic theories such as the claim that the locals descended from pre-Celtic aboriginal inhabitants of Brittany or that "physiognomic similarities" to Mongolians indicate descent from an ancient Asian race.

During the nineteenth century local costumes became increasingly elaborate and colourful. Especially famous was the tall lace bonnet worn by the women, which covered only the top of the skull and extended to a triangle of fabric mounted on a base. These were embroidered with patterns of flowers. Mrs Bury Pallister, writing in 1869, described it as follows,

the cap, or 'bigouden' is composed of two pieces: first, a kind of skull-cap, or sere-tête, fitting tight over the ears, then a little round bit, resembling, the young people said, a "pork pie" hat, made of starched linen, pinched into a three-cornered peak, the middle peak embroidered, and tied on by a piece of tape fastening under the chin.

By around 1900 this had evolved into a tall sugarloaf shape. In the early twentieth century the cap became even taller, reaching fifteen to twenty centimeters in the late 1920s and even taller just after the Second World War. Until 2000, the cap has hovered between 30 and 35 centimeters in height by 12-14 centimeters wide at the base. René Quillivic's statue La Bigoudène at Pors-Poulhan depicts a woman wearing the headdress. It marks the border between Pays Bigouden and Cap Sizun. Pêr-Jakez Helias, a major Breton writer of the 20th century, was from the Bigouden.

The traditional language of the Bigouden region is Breton, specifically the Cornouaille dialect, although usage has declined in recent decades due to language shift and urbanization. Revitalization efforts are ongoing through local schools and cultural associations.

== Flag ==
A flag of the Bigouden was created in 1992 as part of the local promotion of the area. It was designed by Bernard Le Brun at the request of the Association de Promotion du Pays bigouden. It comprises three parts. The left includes heraldic ermines, representing the twenty Bigoudène communes (formerly 22). The golden colour represents the art of gold embroidery, which once dominated the region. The three orange stripes on the right recall the three cantons of the area.
