= Plogastel-Saint-Germain =

Plogastel-Saint-Germain Plogastell-Sant-Jermen
- Commune
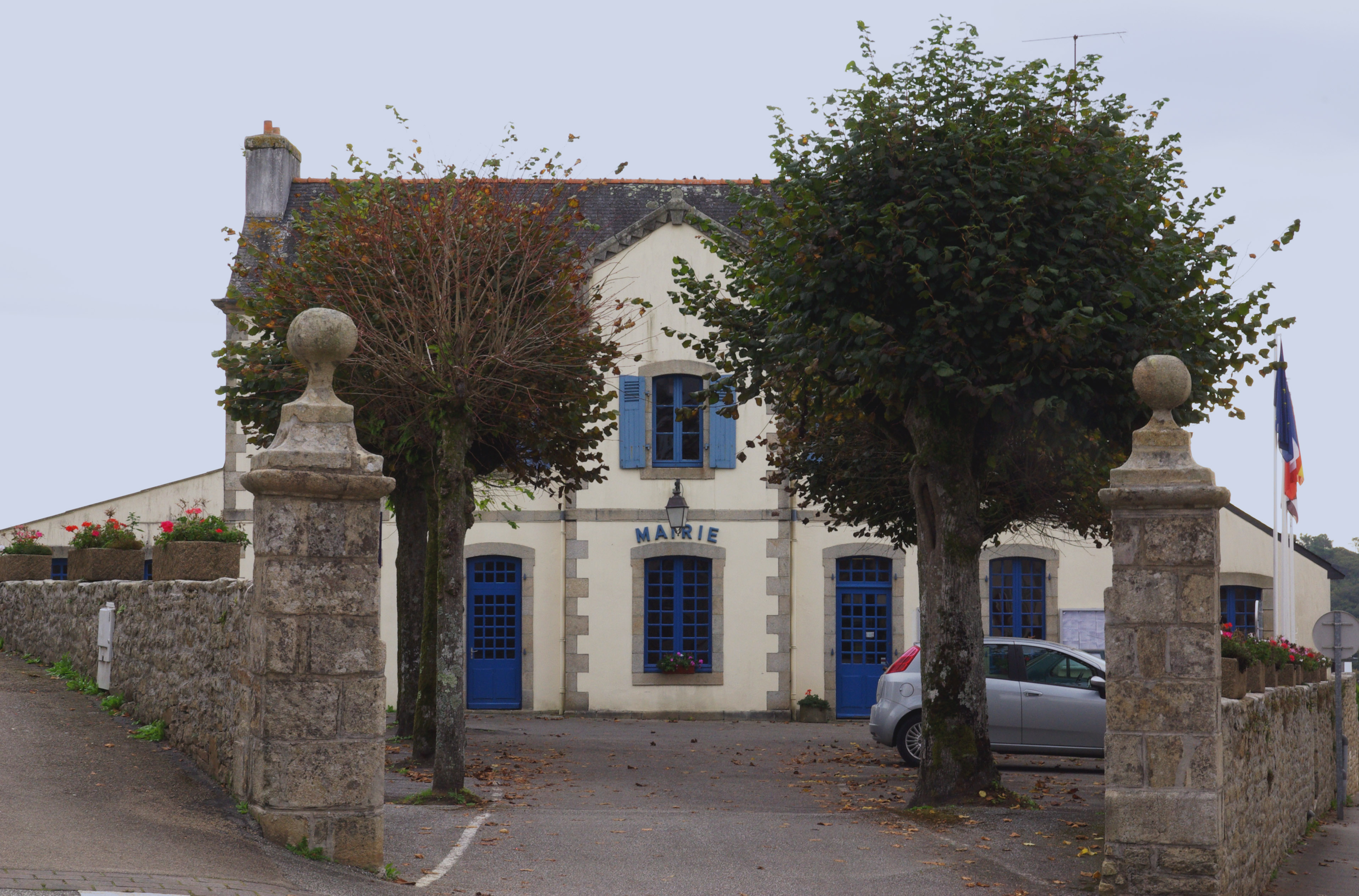
- The town hall in Plogastel-Saint-Germain

- Coat of arms
- Location of Plogastel-Saint-Germain
- Location within France Location within Brittany
- Coordinates: 47°59′04″N 4°16′13″W
- Country: France
- Region: Brittany
- Department: Finistère
- Arrondissement: Quimper
- Canton: Plonéour-Lanvern
- Intercommunality: Haut-Pays Bigouden

Government
  - Mayor (2020–2026): Annie Berrivin
- Area^{1}: 31.39 km^{2} (12.12 sq mi)
- Highest elevation: 160 m (520 ft)
- Lowest elevation: 35 m (115 ft)
- Population (2023): 2,024
  - Density: 64.48/km^{2} (167.0/sq mi)
- Time zone: UTC+01:00 (CET)
  - Summer (DST): UTC+02:00 (CEST)
- INSEE/Postal code: 29167 /29710
- ^{1} French Land Register data, which excludes lakes, ponds, glaciers > 1 km^{2} (0.386 sq mi or 247 acres) and river estuaries.

Plogastel-Saint-Germain (French pronunciation: [plɔɡastɛl sɛ̃ ʒɛʁmɛ̃]; Breton: Plogastell-Sant-Jermen) is a commune in the department of Finistère, in the Brittany region, 15 km west of Quimper. Belonging to Pays Bigouden, within the former political and religious region of Cornouaille, its territory of 31 km2 has a resolutely rural character. There is still a large majority of cultivated land and agricultural areas (80% of its area), not to mention forests (10%) and meadows (8%).The municipalities (or old municipalities, urban areas) bordering Ploegastel-Saint-Germain include: Gourlizon, Landudec, Peumerit，Plonéour-Lanvern, Plovan, Pluguffan, Plozévet.

== Population ==
Inhabitants of Plogastel-Saint-Germain are called in French Plogastellois.

Historical population
Year	Pop.	±% p.a.
1968	1,521	—
1975	1,656	+1.22%
1982	1,615	−0.36%
1990	1,687	+0.55%
1999	1,691	+0.03%
2007	1,779	+0.64%
2012	1,857	+0.86%
2017	1,953	+1.01%
2023	2,024	+0.60%
Source: INSEE

== See also ==
- Communes of the Finistère department
