= Tréogat =

Tréogat Trêgad
- Commune
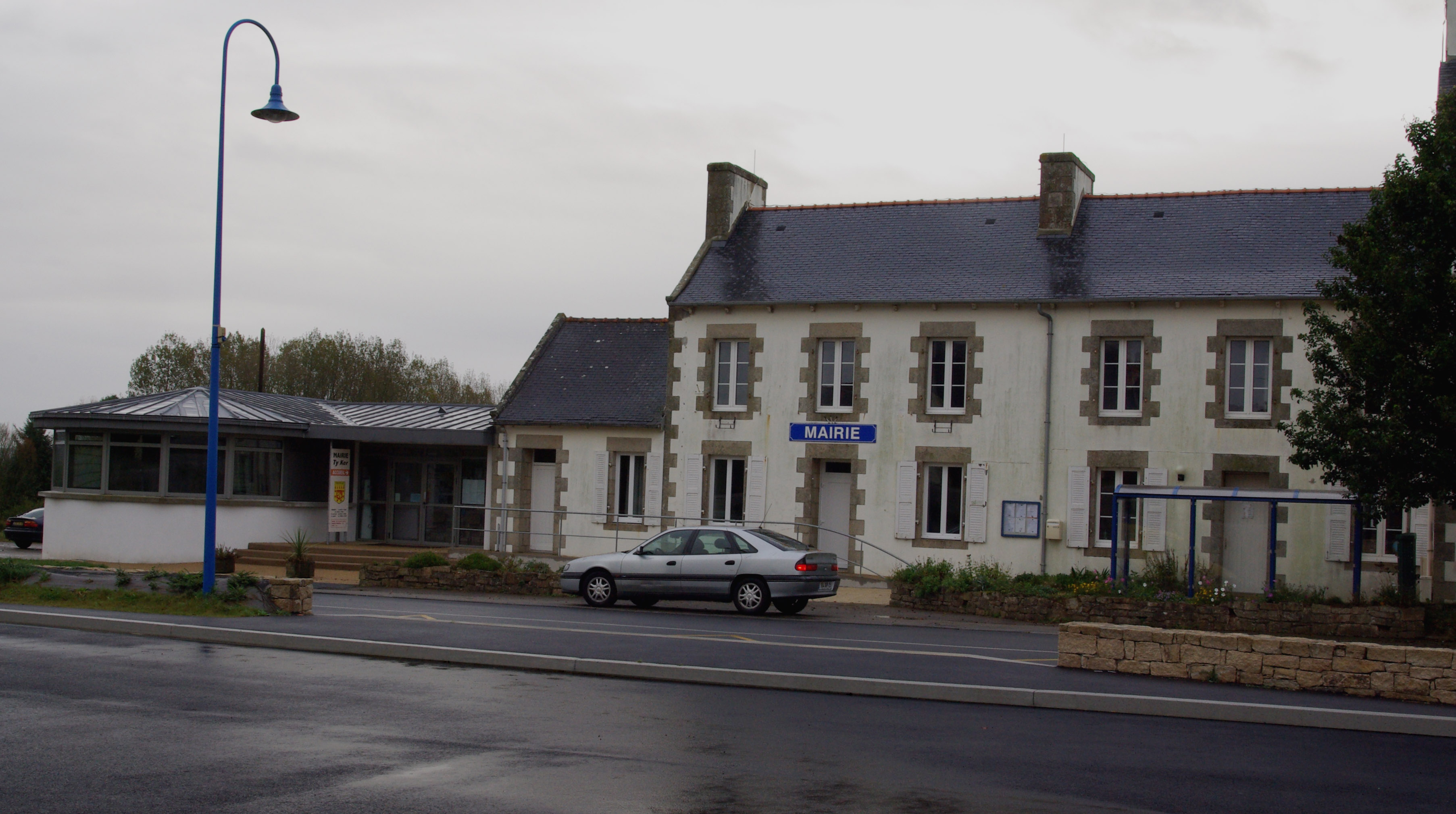
- The town hall in Tréogat

- Coat of arms
- Location of Tréogat
- Location within France Location within Brittany
- Coordinates: 47°55′13″N 4°19′19″W
- Country: France
- Region: Brittany
- Department: Finistère
- Arrondissement: Quimper
- Canton: Plonéour-Lanvern
- Intercommunality: Haut-Pays Bigouden

Government
  - Mayor (2023–2026): Alain Gerbe
- Area^{1}: 9.85 km^{2} (3.80 sq mi)
- Highest elevation: 51 m (167 ft)
- Lowest elevation: 0 m (0 ft)
- Population (2023): 573
  - Density: 58.2/km^{2} (151/sq mi)
- Time zone: UTC+01:00 (CET)
  - Summer (DST): UTC+02:00 (CEST)
- INSEE/Postal code: 29298 /29720
- ^{1} French Land Register data, which excludes lakes, ponds, glaciers > 1 km^{2} (0.386 sq mi or 247 acres) and river estuaries.

Tréogat (French pronunciation: [tʁeɔɡat]; Breton: Trêgad) is a commune in the Finistère department of Brittany in north-western France.

== Geography ==
Departmental Route 2 road connects Tréogat with Plonéour-Lanvern and Pont-l'Abbé to the south west, and Pouldreuzic and Plozévet to the north west. The commune reaches the Atlantic coast at the Plage De Treogat in the Bay of Audierne. In addition to the main village of Tréogat, the commune consists of a number of hamlets.

Forming part of the boundary between Tréogat and the commune of Tréguennec is the Étang de Trunvel or Trunvel pond or lake; a coastal marsh covering 264 hectares (1 sq mi) and listed as a type 1 Zone naturelle d'intérêt écologique, faunistique et floristique (ZNIEFF). The pond is a migratory destination for the aquatic warbler and provides nesting habitats for the Savi's warbler, sedge warbler, turdoid or great reed warbler, bearded reedling, bluethroat, northern wheatear and corn bunting. The marsh pea has found a home here after a hundred year absence and there are patches of common bladderwort, water germander and marsh orchid.

Connected to Trunvel lake by a man-made canal is the Étang de Kergalan or Kergalan pond of 116 hectares (0.45 sq mi), divided between the communes of Tréogat and Plovan. The invasive water primrose, Ludwigia uruguaynensis, viewed as a threat to native aquatic vegetation has been found here and uprooted.

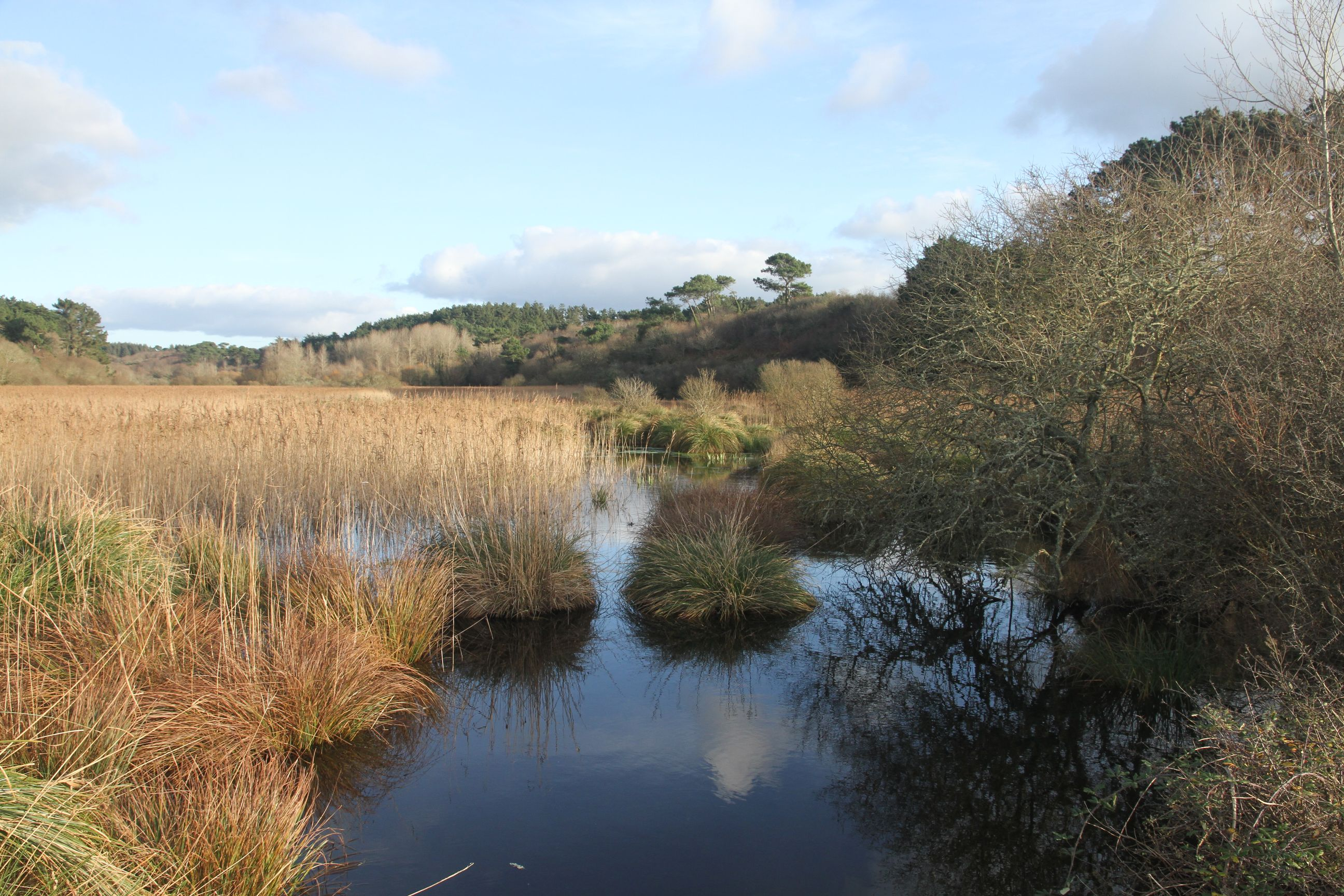
Etang de Trunvel

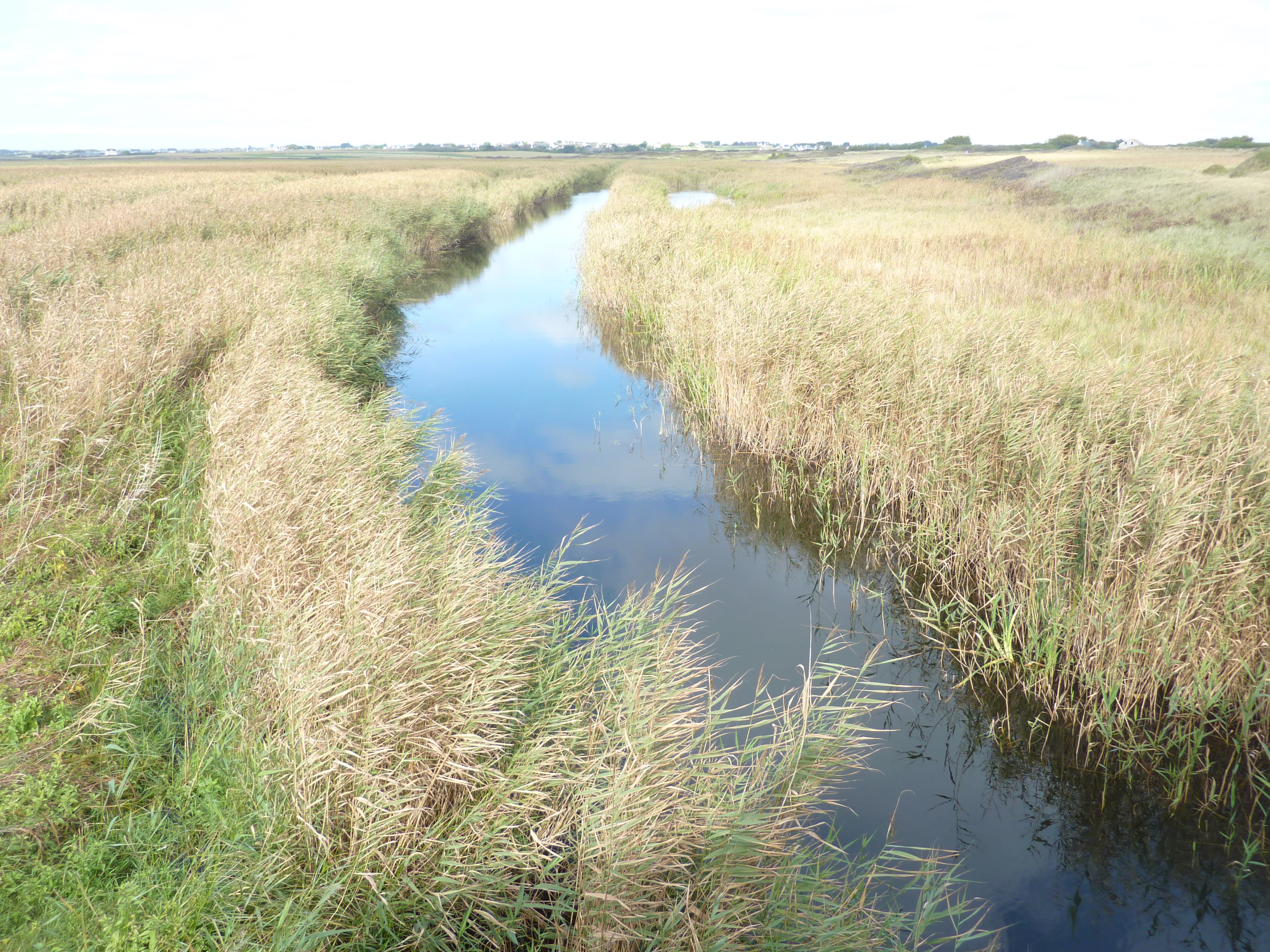
Canal between Trunvel and Kergalan ponds from Kerbinigou

== Population ==
Inhabitants of Tréogat are called Tréogatais in French.

== Monuments ==
At Penhors stands a megalith in the form of a 3.6 m (12 ft) tall fluted, granite protohistoric stele originally from Saint-Mélon chapel in Tréogat. Two 16th-century stone crosses stand; one 2.8 m (9.2 ft) tall on the Rue de la Fontaine, close to the Church of Saint Boscat and the other at Kerguenol, 1 km south.

== See also ==
- Communes of the Finistère department
