= Ambroise Guellec =

French politician

Ambroise Guellec (born 26 March 1941 in Peumerit, Finistère) is a French politician and Member of the European Parliament for Western France. He is a member of the Union for a Popular Movement, which is part of the European People's Party, and sits on the European Parliament's Committee on Regional Development.

He is a substitute for the Committee on Fisheries, a member of the delegation to the EU–Mexico Joint Parliamentary Committee, and a substitute for the delegation for relations with Mercosur.

== Career ==
- Agricultural engineer, National Institute of Agriculture (Paris)
- Mayor of Pouldreuzic (since 1979)
- Member of the Brittany Regional Council (since 1992)
- Vice-Chairman (1992–2004)
- Member of the National Assembly for Finistère (1988–1997)
- State Secretary for the Sea (1986–1988)
- Chairman of the Committee for the Loire-Brittany basin (since 1987)
- Knight of the Legion of Honour
