= Tudy =

Tudy may refer to:

== People ==
- Tudy of Landevennec, Breton saint

== Places ==
- Île-Tudy, France
- St Tudy, United Kingdom
