= Arrondissement of Quimper =

Coordinates: 47°59′N 4°06′W

Quimper
- Arrondissement
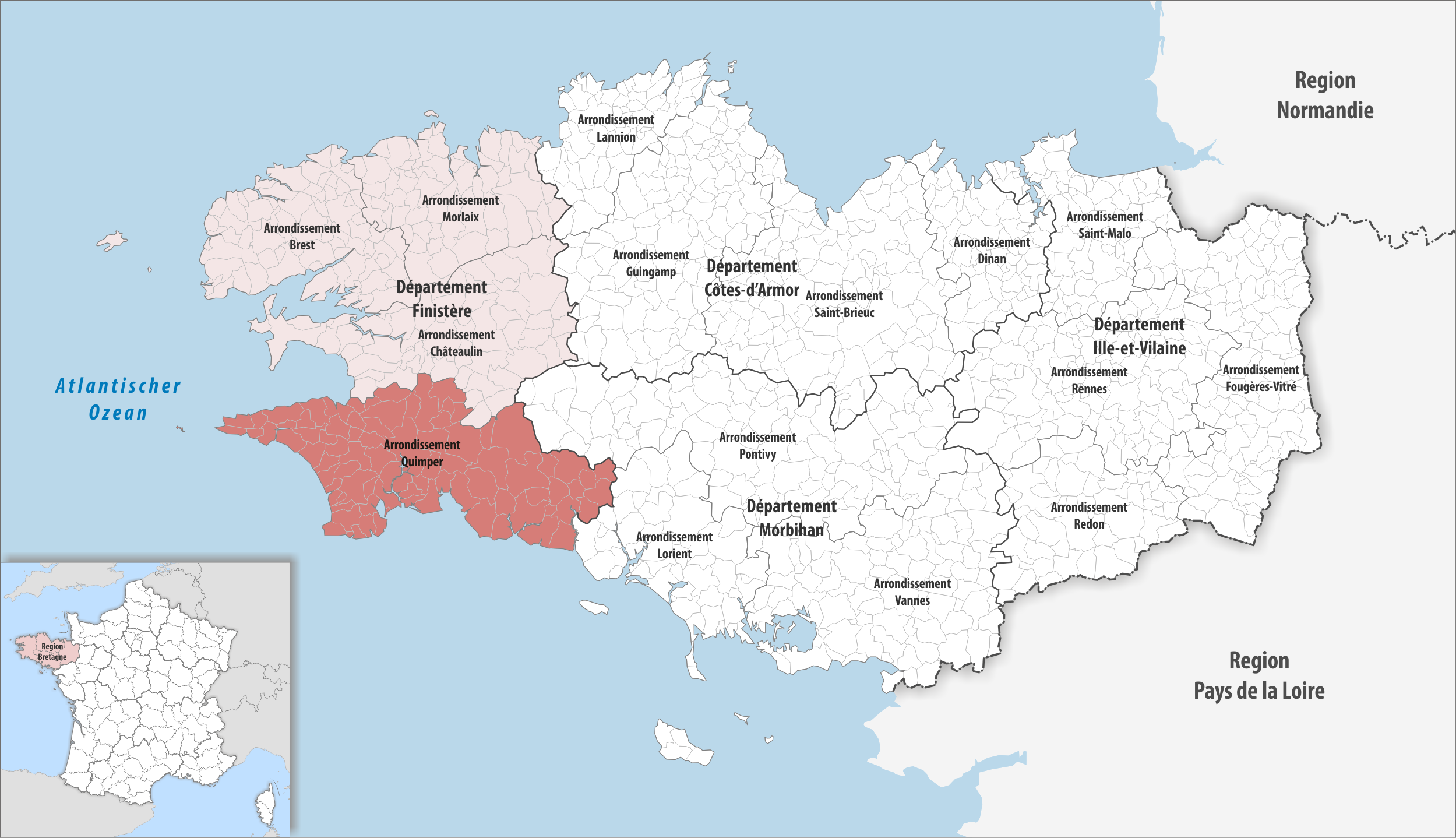
- Location within the region Brittany
- Country: France
- Region: Brittany
- Department: Finistère
- No. of communes: {{{nbcomm}}}
- Area: 2,249.6 km^{2} (868.6 sq mi)
- Population (2023): 333,001
  - Density: 148.03/km^{2} (383.39/sq mi)
- INSEE code: 294

The arrondissement of Quimper (Breton: arondisamant Kemper) is an arrondissement of France in the Finistère department, Brittany. It has 84 communes. Its population is 329,393 (2021), and its area is 2,249.6 km^{2} (868.6 sq mi).

== Composition ==
The communes of the arrondissement of Quimper, and their INSEE codes, are:

1. Arzano (29002)
2. Audierne (29003)
3. Bannalec (29004)
4. Baye (29005)
5. Bénodet (29006)
6. Beuzec-Cap-Sizun (29008)
7. Briec (29020)
8. Cléden-Cap-Sizun (29028)
9. Clohars-Carnoët (29031)
10. Clohars-Fouesnant (29032)
11. Combrit (29037)
12. Concarneau (29039)
13. Confort-Meilars (29145)
14. Douarnenez (29046)
15. Edern (29048)
16. Elliant (29049)
17. Ergué-Gabéric (29051)
18. La Forêt-Fouesnant (29057)
19. Fouesnant (29058)
20. Gouesnac'h (29060)
21. Goulien (29063)
22. Gourlizon (29065)
23. Guengat (29066)
24. Guiler-sur-Goyen (29070)
25. Guilligomarc'h (29071)
26. Guilvinec (29072)
27. Île-de-Sein (29083)
28. Île-Tudy (29085)
29. Le Juch (29087)
30. Kerlaz (29090)
31. Landrévarzec (29106)
32. Landudal (29107)
33. Landudec (29108)
34. Langolen (29110)
35. Locronan (29134)
36. Loctudy (29135)
37. Locunolé (29136)
38. Mahalon (29143)
39. Melgven (29146)
40. Mellac (29147)
41. Moëlan-sur-Mer (29150)
42. Névez (29153)
43. Penmarch (29158)
44. Peumerit (29159)
45. Pleuven (29161)
46. Plobannalec-Lesconil (29165)
47. Plogastel-Saint-Germain (29167)
48. Plogoff (29168)
49. Plogonnec (29169)
50. Plomelin (29170)
51. Plomeur (29171)
52. Plonéis (29173)
53. Plonéour-Lanvern (29174)
54. Plouhinec (29197)
55. Plovan (29214)
56. Plozévet (29215)
57. Pluguffan (29216)
58. Pont-Aven (29217)
59. Pont-Croix (29218)
60. Pont-l'Abbé (29220)
61. Pouldergat (29224)
62. Pouldreuzic (29225)
63. Poullan-sur-Mer (29226)
64. Primelin (29228)
65. Quéménéven (29229)
66. Querrien (29230)
67. Quimper (29232)
68. Quimperlé (29233)
69. Rédené (29234)
70. Riec-sur-Bélon (29236)
71. Rosporden (29241)
72. Saint-Évarzec (29247)
73. Saint-Jean-Trolimon (29252)
74. Saint-Thurien (29269)
75. Saint-Yvi (29272)
76. Scaër (29274)
77. Tourch (29281)
78. Treffiagat (29284)
79. Tréguennec (29292)
80. Trégunc (29293)
81. Tréméoc (29296)
82. Tréméven (29297)
83. Tréogat (29298)
84. Le Trévoux (29300)

== History ==
The arrondissement of Quimper was created in 1800. At the January 2017 reorganisation of the arrondissements of Finistère, it gained three communes from the arrondissement of Châteaulin.

As a result of the reorganisation of the cantons of France which came into effect in 2015, the borders of the cantons are no longer related to the borders of the arrondissements. The cantons of the arrondissement of Quimper were, as of January 2015:

1. Arzano
2. Bannalec
3. Briec
4. Concarneau
5. Douarnenez
6. Fouesnant
7. Guilvinec
8. Plogastel-Saint-Germain
9. Pont-Aven
10. Pont-Croix
11. Pont-l'Abbé
12. Quimper-1
13. Quimper-2
14. Quimper-3
15. Quimperlé
16. Rosporden
17. Scaër
