= Plomeur =

Plomeur Ploveur
- Commune
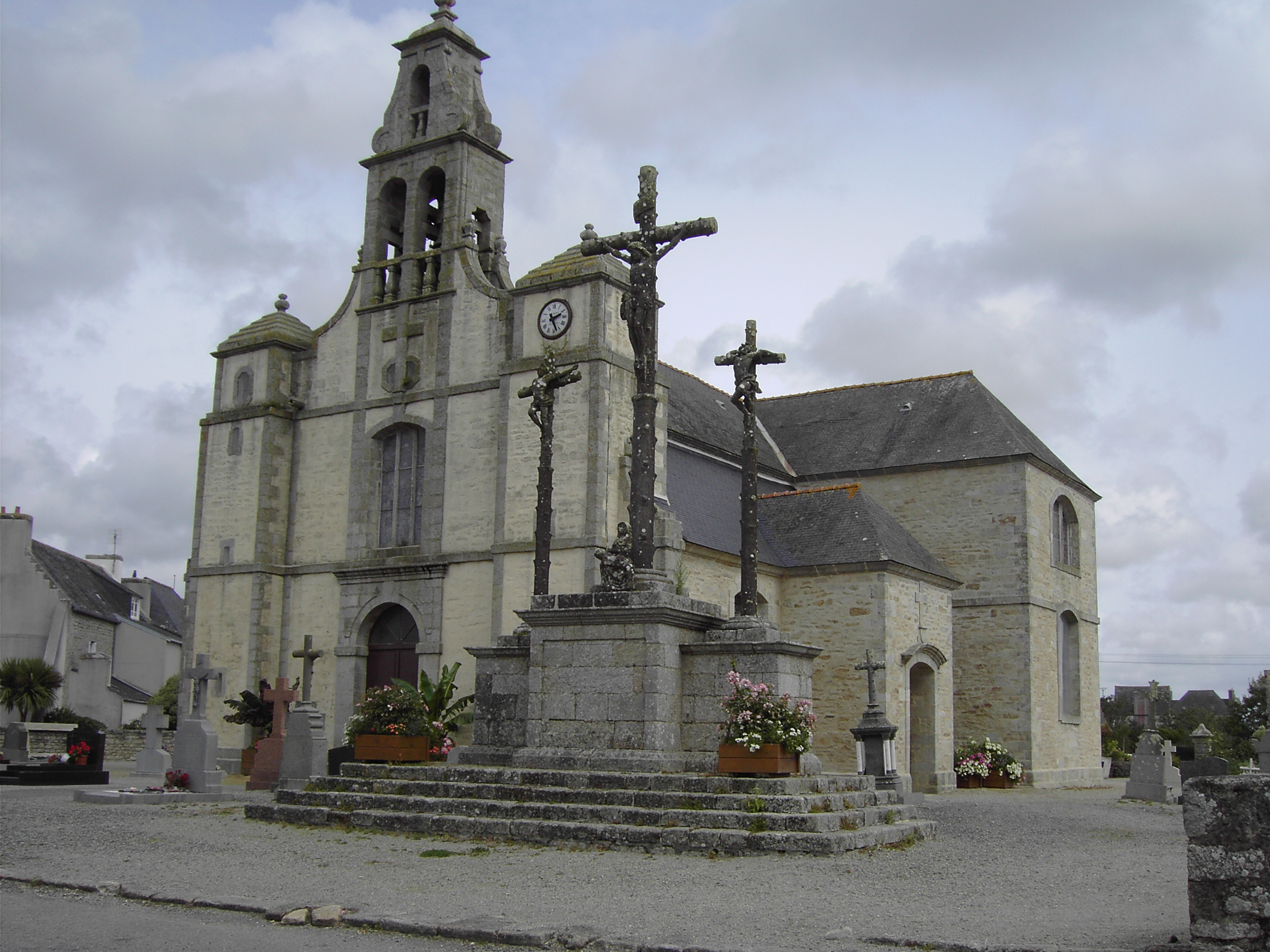
- The church and the calvary in Plomeur

- Coat of arms
- Location of Plomeur
- Location within France Location within Brittany
- Coordinates: 47°50′28″N 4°17′00″W
- Country: France
- Region: Brittany
- Department: Finistère
- Arrondissement: Quimper
- Canton: Plonéour-Lanvern
- Intercommunality: Pays Bigouden Sud

Government
  - Mayor (2020–2026): Ronan Crédou
- Area^{1}: 29.69 km^{2} (11.46 sq mi)
- Highest elevation: 37 m (121 ft)
- Lowest elevation: 0 m (0 ft)
- Population (2023): 3,904
  - Density: 131.5/km^{2} (340.6/sq mi)
- Time zone: UTC+01:00 (CET)
  - Summer (DST): UTC+02:00 (CEST)
- INSEE/Postal code: 29171 /29120
- ^{1} French Land Register data, which excludes lakes, ponds, glaciers > 1 km^{2} (0.386 sq mi or 247 acres) and river estuaries.

Plomeur (French pronunciation: [plɔmœʁ]; Breton: Ploveur) is a commune in the Bigouden region of Finistère department of Brittany in north-western France.

Plomeur is situated between the larger communes of Penmarc'h to the South-West, Guilvinec and Treffiagat to the South, as well as Pont-l'Abbé to the East.

The beaches on the Baie d'Audierne are shared with the community of Tréguennec to the north and Pors-Carn (part of the commune of Penmarc'h) to the south.

The beach is divided by the Pointe de la Torche, a promontory and rocky granite outcropping as well as a prehistoric settlement and burial site registered as a historic monument.

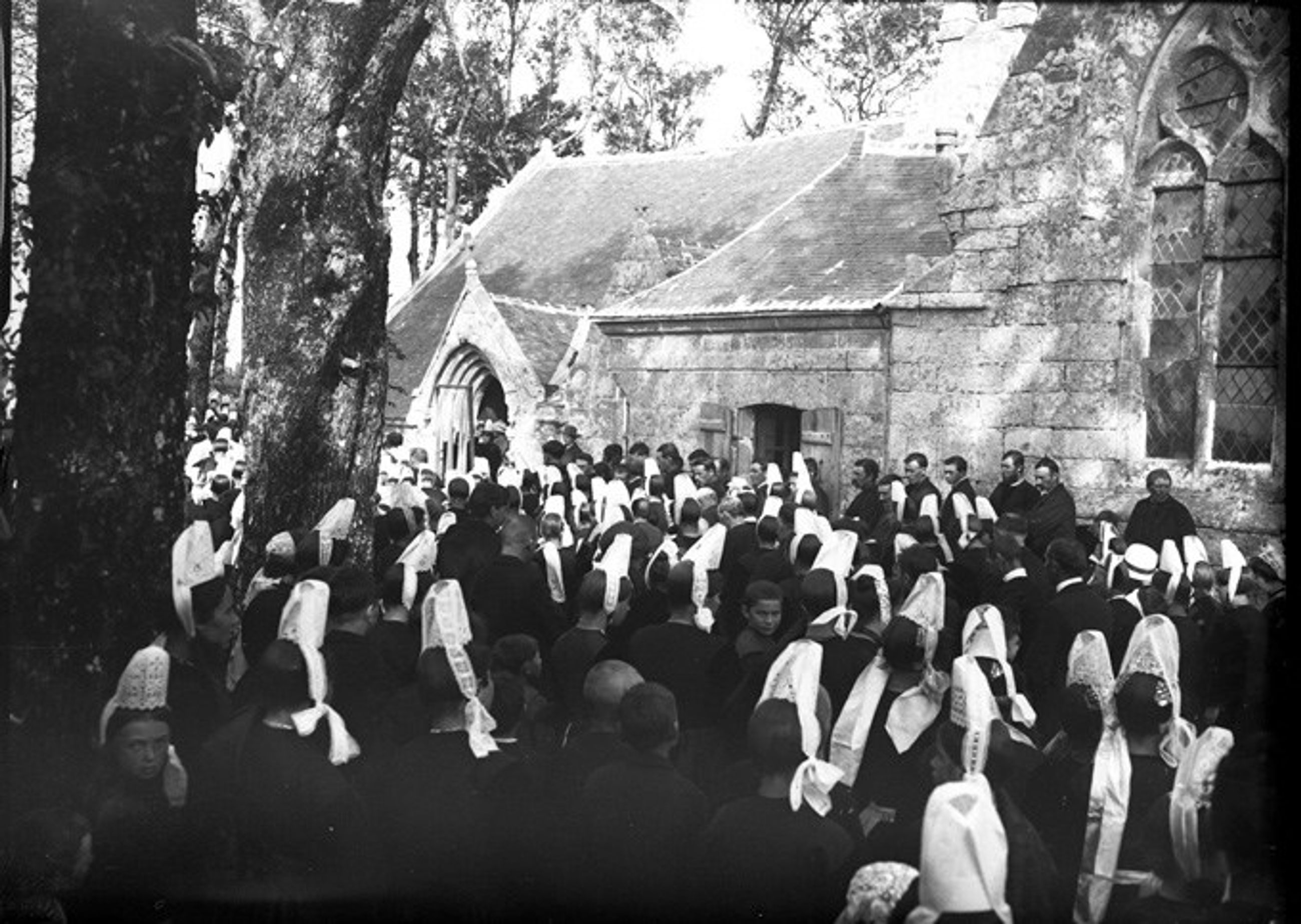
Pardon at the Notre-Dame de Tréminou chapel in 1920 captured by Jacques de Thézac

== Population ==
Inhabitants of Plomeur are called in French Plomeurois.

Historical population
Year	Pop.	±% p.a.
1968	1,916	—
1975	2,263	+2.41%
1982	2,852	+3.36%
1990	3,272	+1.73%
1999	3,203	−0.24%
2007	3,494	+1.09%
2012	3,833	+1.87%
2017	3,774	−0.31%
2023	3,904	+0.57%
Source: INSEE

== Breton language ==
The municipality launched a linguistic plan concerning the Breton language through Ya d'ar brezhoneg on 28 April 2006.

In 2009, 30.71% of primary-school children attended bilingual schools.

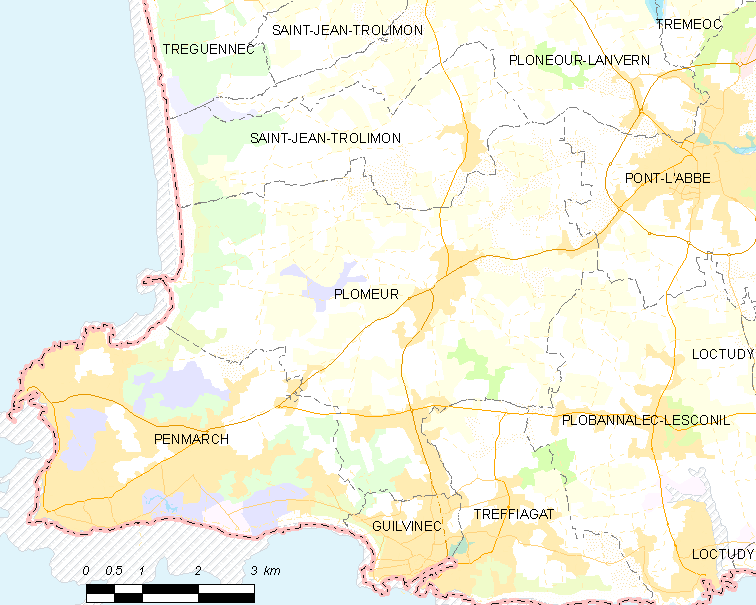

== See also ==
- Communes of the Finistère department
