= Saint Vouga =

Irish saint

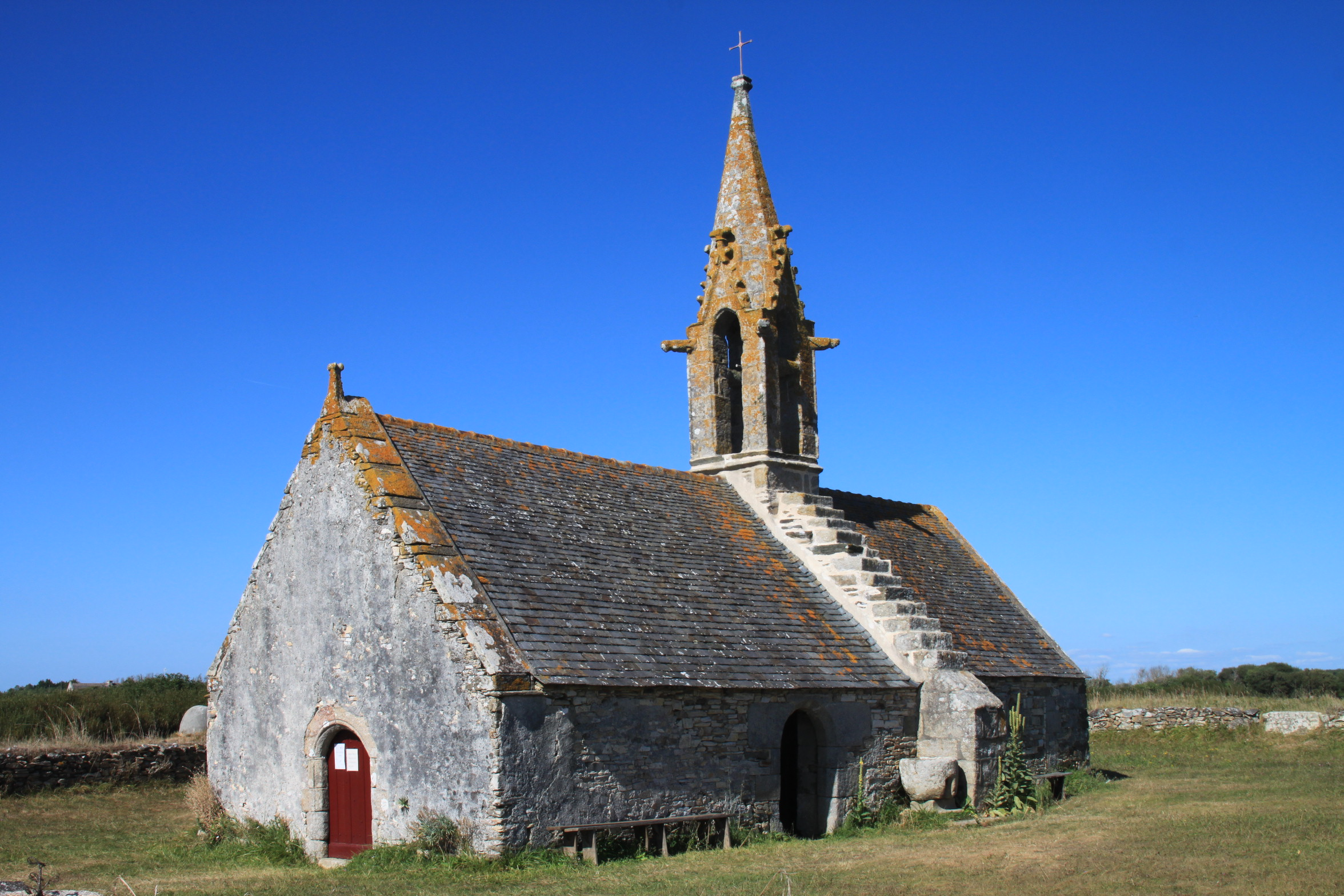
- Chapel of Saint-Vio in Tréguennec
- Born: 6th century Ireland
- Residence: Penmarch, Brittany
- Died: 585; Lesneven, Brittany
- Feast: 25 June

Saint Vouga (or Vougar, Vaughe, Vauge, Vorech, Vie; died 585) was an Irish priest who moved to Brittany, now in France. He attempted to live as a hermit, but could not avoid people who came to him for cures, drawn by his reputation.

== Monks of Ramsgate account ==
The monks of St Augustine's Abbey, Ramsgate wrote in their Book of Saints (1921),

Vorech (Vaughe) (St.) (June 15)
(6th century) An Irish priest from Armagh who, coming to Cornwall, (Note: The name "Cornwall" refers to Cornouaille in Brittany, rather than Cornwall in England.) lived there as a hermit until his death (A.D. 585). He is the Patron Saint of Llanlivery.

== Baring-Gould's account ==
Sabine Baring-Gould (1834–1924) in his Lives Of The Saints wrote,

S. VOUGAS, B.
(6TH CENT.)
[Gallican Martyrologies. Venerated in Brittany. Authority :-A late life founded on popular tradition.]

S. VOUGAS, or Vie, is venerated especially at Treguenec, in Brittany, where his relics is said to have been preserved. He is thought to have been an Irish bishop who mounted a stone, and sailed across the sea on it; a tradition which has sprung up from the fact of a rock off the coast being called the Ship, from a fancied resemblance to one; and then, in course of time, it was supposed to be S. Vie's ship.

== Butler's account ==
The hagiographer Alban Butler (1710–1773) wrote in his Lives of the Fathers, Martyrs, and Other Principal Saints under May 28,

Saint Vauge, Hermit. He was a holy priest in the church of Armagh, who, to fly the archiepiscopal dignity, retired into Cornwall. He landed at Penmarch in that county, and being honourably received, built himself a hermitage, yet often went out to preach to the people, and kindle in their breasts the most ardent desire of Christian perfection. He was called to receive the recompense of his labours on the 15th of June 585. Under the name of Saint Vorech he seems titular saint of Llanlivery in Cornwall.

== O'Hanlon's account ==
John O'Hanlon (1821–1905) wrote of "Vouga, Vie or Vauk, Bishop in Brittany, France" in his Lives of the Irish Saints. He opens with a disclaimer: "Of a very unsatisfactory character is the information we are permitted to communicate regarding the present ascetic man, the greater part of whose life and actions appears to have been concealed from men and known only to the Almighty." After discussing the sources, Hanlon continues,

We are told by Albert le Grand, that the venerable man Vouga lived in Ireland, and that owing to his innocence and uprightness he was ordained a priest, becoming a canon in the church of Armagh, and afterwards its Archbishop, and the Primate of Ireland. For these latter statements, however, there are no historic grounds, and they must be dismissed as altogether misleading and inaccurate. It is related, furthermore, that having received those honours with great reluctance, he soon desired to be released from such a weight of responsibility, and therefore he importuned God with prayers, that he might be permitted to seek some monastery or desert place, where his life should be wholly devoted to heavenly contemplation. The Almighty heard his petitions. He was inspired to sail over the ocean, and to a country where he was destined to find rest, as also to gather great fruits. Vouga then returned thanks to the Almighty, for thus manifesting his divine approval.

Leaving his See of Armagh and its residence by night, he sought the sea coast, where, however, he found no vessel to carry him away. There were some large rocks beside the shore, and these were to furnish a means for transit. One of the legends concerning him states, that he mounted on a huge stone, which he wished to serve as a ship, and that it should move to whatever place had been allotted for his residence. He sailed across the sea on it, until after a voyage of nearly twenty-four hours, he was wafted towards Armoric Britain. He entered the port of Cornuaille, known as Penmarch or Peninarck. Fables have been added to this voyage, which probably had been undertaken in an ordinary sailing vessel of the time. The arrival of St. Vouga, with many other holy men, who came from Great Britain, into Brittany, has been ascribed to before 523, while Hormisdas was Pope, while Justin Augustus presided over the Empire, while Hoel II. ruled in Upper Armorica, and while Jugduvale governed in Lower Armorica.

Having left his friends and native country, Vouga resolved on leading an eremitical life in Little Britain. He is said to have received a public welcome from the people of Penmarck, who provided for him a place and house in which to reside. There he preached the Word of God, and he worked many miracles. Afterwards, Vouga erected a hermitage for himself, about one-half mile from Penmarck, so that he might devote himself to a contemplative life. However, his reputation for sanctity having spread throughout all that part of the country, the people flocked to him in crowds, to be healed of fevers and other disorders. Among other miracles recorded is one of his having restored a woman to life. Finding that this intercourse with worldings tended to distract his pious meditations, he soon resolved on leaving that place. He went from Lanveoc to Brest, but still he could not find a place for rest; until passing through the city of Leineven, he sought a dense wood. There he erected a small oratory with a but near it. Afterwards, he associated with some religious, in the exercise of meritorious works, until it pleased the Almighty to call him away from the labours of this life to his eternal reward. He died it is stated, on the 15th day of June, about the year 585.

O'Hanlon goes on to describe the fate of the saint's relics, which had miraculous properties, veneration at a chapel in Treguenec near Penmark, and other churches. A church and well are dedicated to Saint Vauk or Vaak in St. Vogue's townland, Carn parish in County Wexford. Possibly St. Vauk is the same as St. Vouga. The ruined church of St Vauk does not appear to be very ancient.

== Sources ==
- Baring-Gould, Sabine (1897), The Lives Of The Saints, vol. 6, June, London: J. C. Nimmo This article incorporates text from this source, which is in the public domain.
- Butler, Alban (1799), The Lives of the Primitive Fathers, Martyrs, and Other Principal Saints: Compiled from Original Monuments and Other Authentic Records, vol. 6, J. Moir This article incorporates text from this source, which is in the public domain.
- O'Hanlon, John (1875), Lives of the Irish Saints : with special festivals, and the commemorations of holy persons, Dublin: J. Duffy This article incorporates text from this source, which is in the public domain.
- St. Augustine's Abbey, Ramsgate (1921), The Book of saints : a dictionary of servants of God canonized by the Catholic Church, London: A. & C. Black, ltd. This article incorporates text from this source, which is in the public domain.
