= Canton of Plonéour-Lanvern =

Coordinates: 47.90°N 4.28°W

The canton of Plonéour-Lanvern is an administrative division of the Finistère department, northwestern France. It was created at the French canton reorganisation which came into effect in March 2015. Its seat is in Plonéour-Lanvern.

It consists of the following communes:

1. Combrit
2. Gourlizon
3. Guiler-sur-Goyen
4. Île-Tudy
5. Landudec
6. Peumerit
7. Plogastel-Saint-Germain
8. Plomeur
9. Plonéour-Lanvern
10. Plovan
11. Plozévet
12. Pouldreuzic
13. Saint-Jean-Trolimon
14. Tréguennec
15. Tréméoc
16. Tréogat
