= Tudy of Landevennec =

Breton saint of the 5th century

Saint Tudy of Landevennec
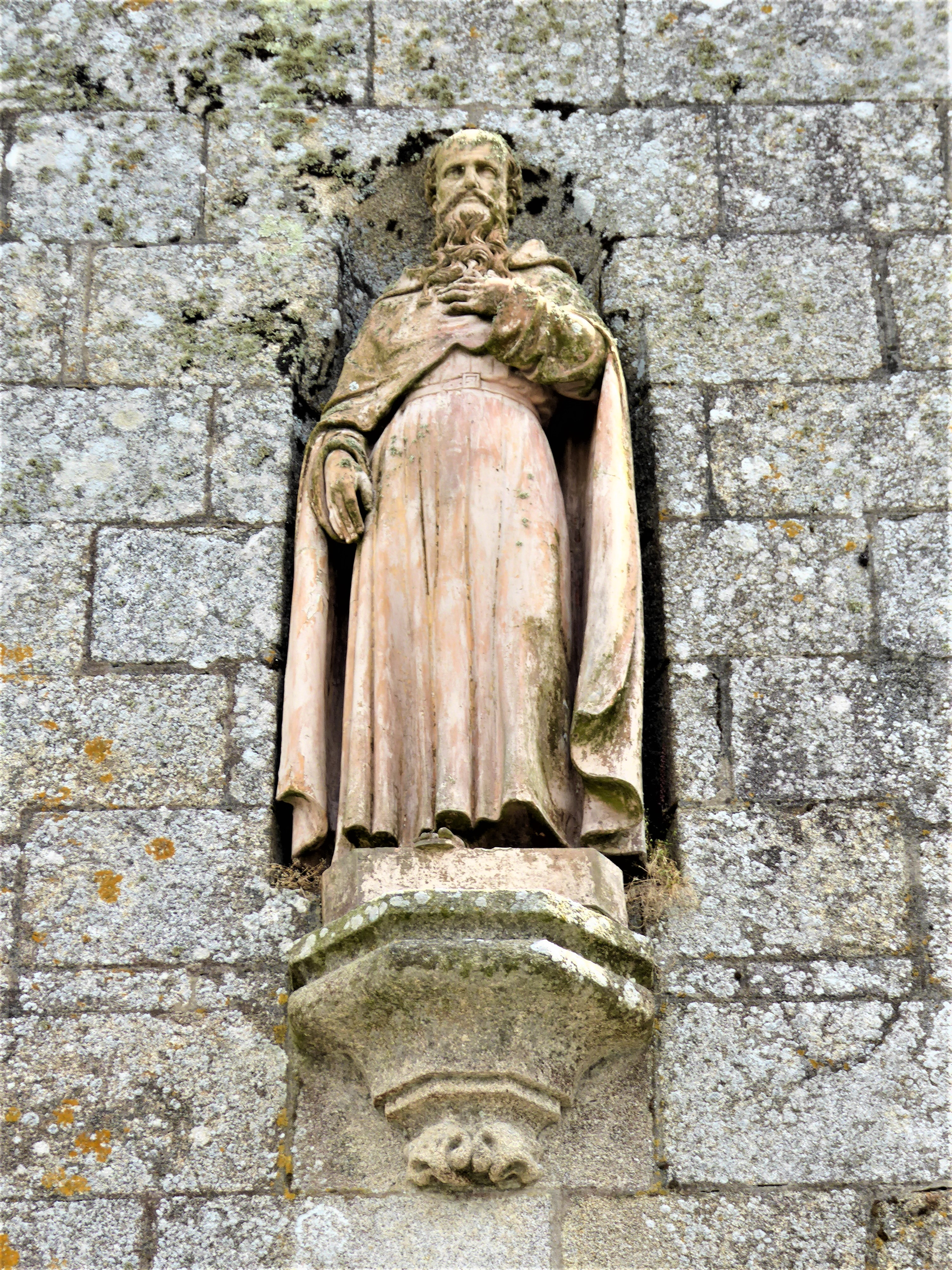
- Statue of St Tudy

Hermit
- Born: Brittany
- Died: 5th or 6th century
- Venerated in: Catholic Church; Eastern Orthodox Church
- Feast: 9 May

Tudy (Tudi, Tudec, Tudinus, Tegwin, Thetgo, Tydie) of Landevennec was a Breton saint of the 5th or 6th century. He was a hermit who founded monasteries at Landévennec in Brittany, France and in Cornwall, England. The village of St Tudy in Cornwall is named for him. He may have been a disciple of Maudez (Maudet, Mawes), after whom St Mawes is named. His companions may have included Corentinus and Brioc. Île-Tudy, on the mouth of the Odet, is named after him.

Tudy is venerated in the Catholic Church and in the Eastern Orthodox Church; his feast day is observed on 9 May or on 11 May.

== See also ==
- Landévennec Abbey
