= Guiler-sur-Goyen =

Guiler-sur-Goyen Gwiler-Kerne
- Commune
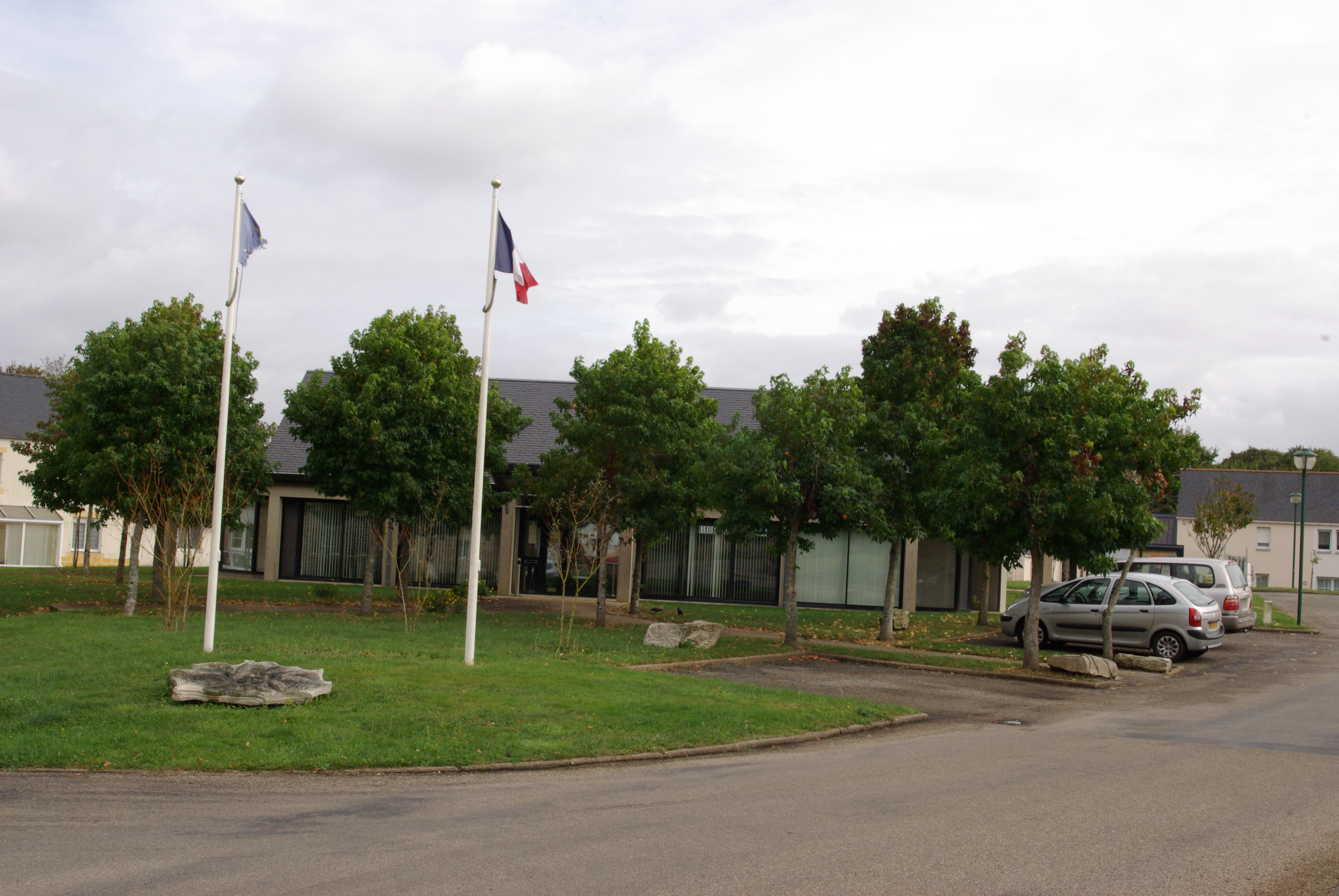
- The town hall in Gwiler-sur-Goyen
- Location of Guiler-sur-Goyen
- Location within France Location within Brittany
- Coordinates: 48°01′00″N 4°21′30″W
- Country: France
- Region: Brittany
- Department: Finistère
- Arrondissement: Quimper
- Canton: Plonéour-Lanvern
- Intercommunality: Haut-Pays Bigouden

Government
  - Mayor (2021–2026): Jacques Cariou
- Area^{1}: 11.25 km^{2} (4.34 sq mi)
- Highest elevation: 133 m (436 ft)
- Lowest elevation: 25 m (82 ft)
- Population (2023): 520
  - Density: 46/km^{2} (120/sq mi)
- Time zone: UTC+01:00 (CET)
  - Summer (DST): UTC+02:00 (CEST)
- INSEE/Postal code: 29070 /29710
- ^{1} French Land Register data, which excludes lakes, ponds, glaciers > 1 km^{2} (0.386 sq mi or 247 acres) and river estuaries.

Guiler-sur-Goyen (Breton: Gwiler-Kerne) is a commune in the Finistère department of Brittany in north-western France.

== Population ==
Inhabitants of Guiler-sur-Goyen are called in French Guileriens.

== See also ==
- Communes of the Finistère department
