= Parc botanique de Cornouaille =

Botanical garden in Kerlever, Combrit, Finistère, Brittany, France

Coordinates: 47.8873°N 4.1929°W

The Parc botanique de Cornouaille (Breton: Park louzawouriezh Kerne) (4 hectares) is a botanical garden located in Kerlever, Combrit, Finistère, Brittany, France. It is open daily in the warmer months; an admission fee is charged.

The garden was established by Jean-Pierre Gueguen in 1981. Today it contains about 3500 plant varieties, with good collections of camellias (550 varieties), rhododendrons (400), magnolias (85), azaleas (80), and hortensias (60). Plantings of interest include Acer trautvetteri, Camellia caudata, Cleyera japonica, Corylus jacquemontii, Distylium racemosum, Embothrium coccineum, Enkianthus perulatus, Magnolia rostrata, and Rhododendron campylocarpum, as well as an aquatic garden (7,000 square metres or 75,300 square feet). The park also contains a mineral museum displaying 1200 specimens from the Armorican Massif and elsewhere.

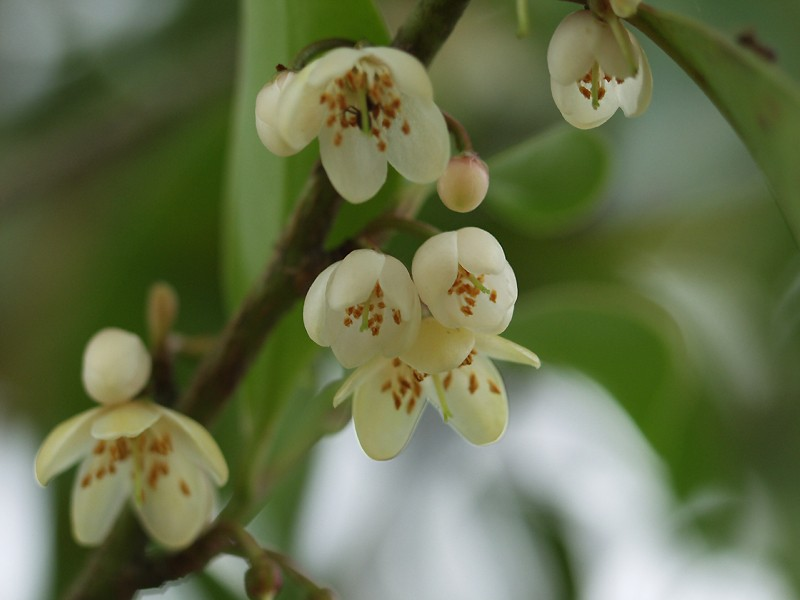
Parc botanique de Cornouaille

== See also ==
- List of botanical gardens in France
