= Guilvinec =

Guilvinec Ar Gelveneg
- Commune
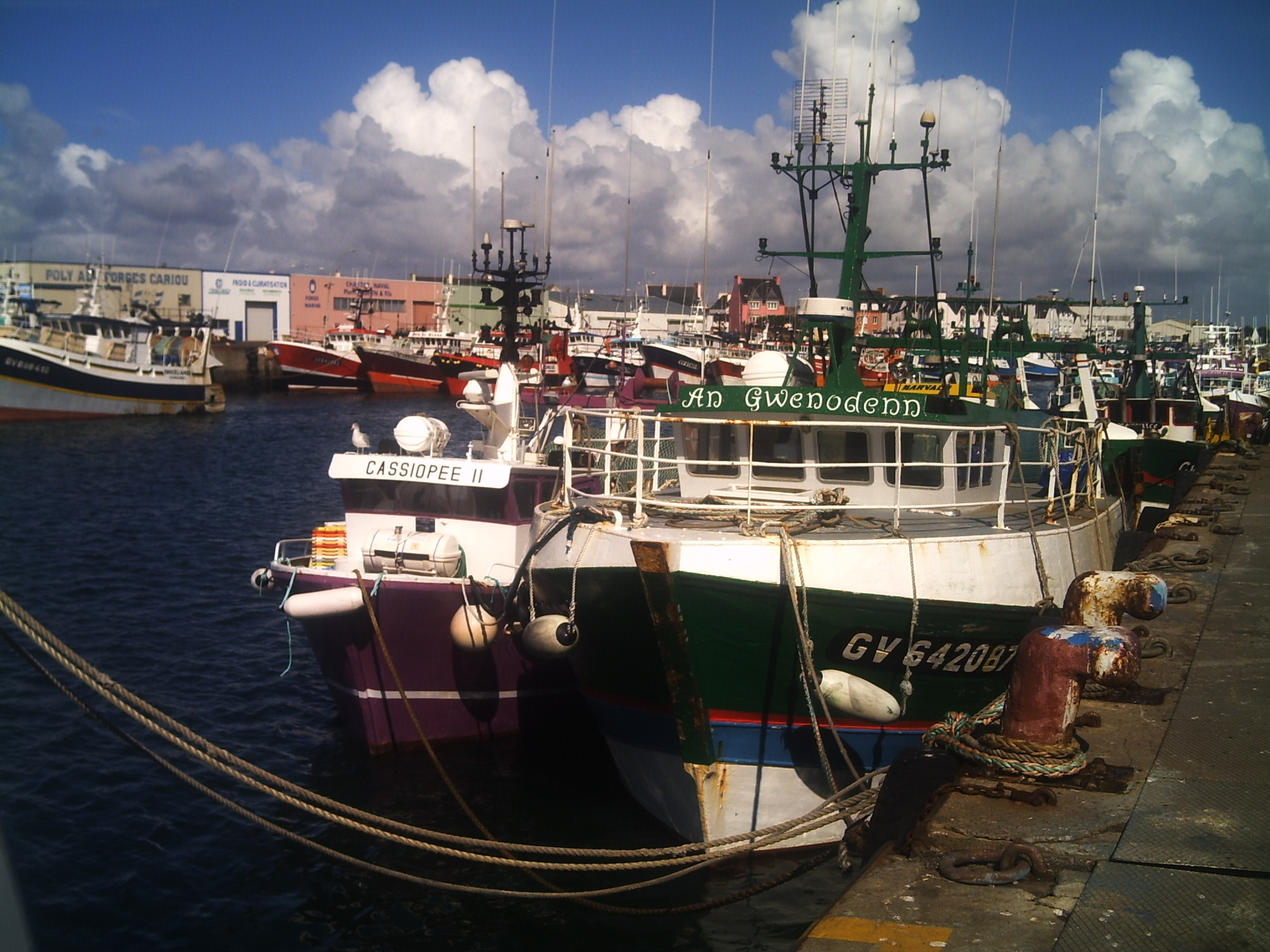
- Fishing port

- Coat of arms
- Location of Guilvinec
- Location within France Location within Brittany
- Coordinates: 47°47′46″N 4°16′57″W
- Country: France
- Region: Brittany
- Department: Finistère
- Arrondissement: Quimper
- Canton: Pont-l'Abbé
- Intercommunality: Pays Bigouden Sud

Government
  - Mayor (2020–2026): Jean-Luc Tanneau
- Area^{1}: 2.46 km^{2} (0.95 sq mi)
- Highest elevation: 17 m (56 ft)
- Lowest elevation: 0 m (0 ft)
- Population (2023): 2,669
  - Density: 1,080/km^{2} (2,810/sq mi)
- Time zone: UTC+01:00 (CET)
  - Summer (DST): UTC+02:00 (CEST)
- INSEE/Postal code: 29072 /29730
- ^{1} French Land Register data, which excludes lakes, ponds, glaciers > 1 km^{2} (0.386 sq mi or 247 acres) and river estuaries.

Guilvinec or Le Guilvinec (French pronunciation: [ɡilvinɛk]; Breton: Ar Gelveneg) is a commune in the Finistère department of Brittany in north-western France. The commune was created in 1880 from part of the commune Plomeur.

== Population ==
Inhabitants of Guilvinec are called in French Guilvinistes.

Historical population

Year	Pop.	±% p.a.
1881	1,968	—
1886	2,603	+5.75%
1891	2,939	+2.46%
1896	3,620	+4.26%
1901	3,884	+1.42%
1906	4,092	+1.05%
1911	4,429	+1.60%
1921	4,584	+0.34%
1926	4,715	+0.57%
1931	4,518	−0.85%
1936	4,522	+0.02%
1946	4,741	+0.47%

Year	Pop.	±% p.a.
1954	4,804	+0.17%
1962	5,037	+0.59%
1968	5,012	−0.08%
1975	4,604	−1.21%
1982	4,091	−1.67%
1990	3,365	−2.41%
1999	3,042	−1.11%
2007	3,051	+0.04%
2012	2,938	−0.75%
2017	2,658	−1.98%
2023	2,669	+0.07%

Source: EHESS and INSEE (1968-2023)

== Economy ==
Guilvinec is an important fishing port.

== Breton language ==
The municipality launched a linguistic plan through Ya d'ar brezhoneg on 4 February 2006.

== See also ==
- Communes of the Finistère department
