= Combrit =

Combrit Kombrid
- Commune
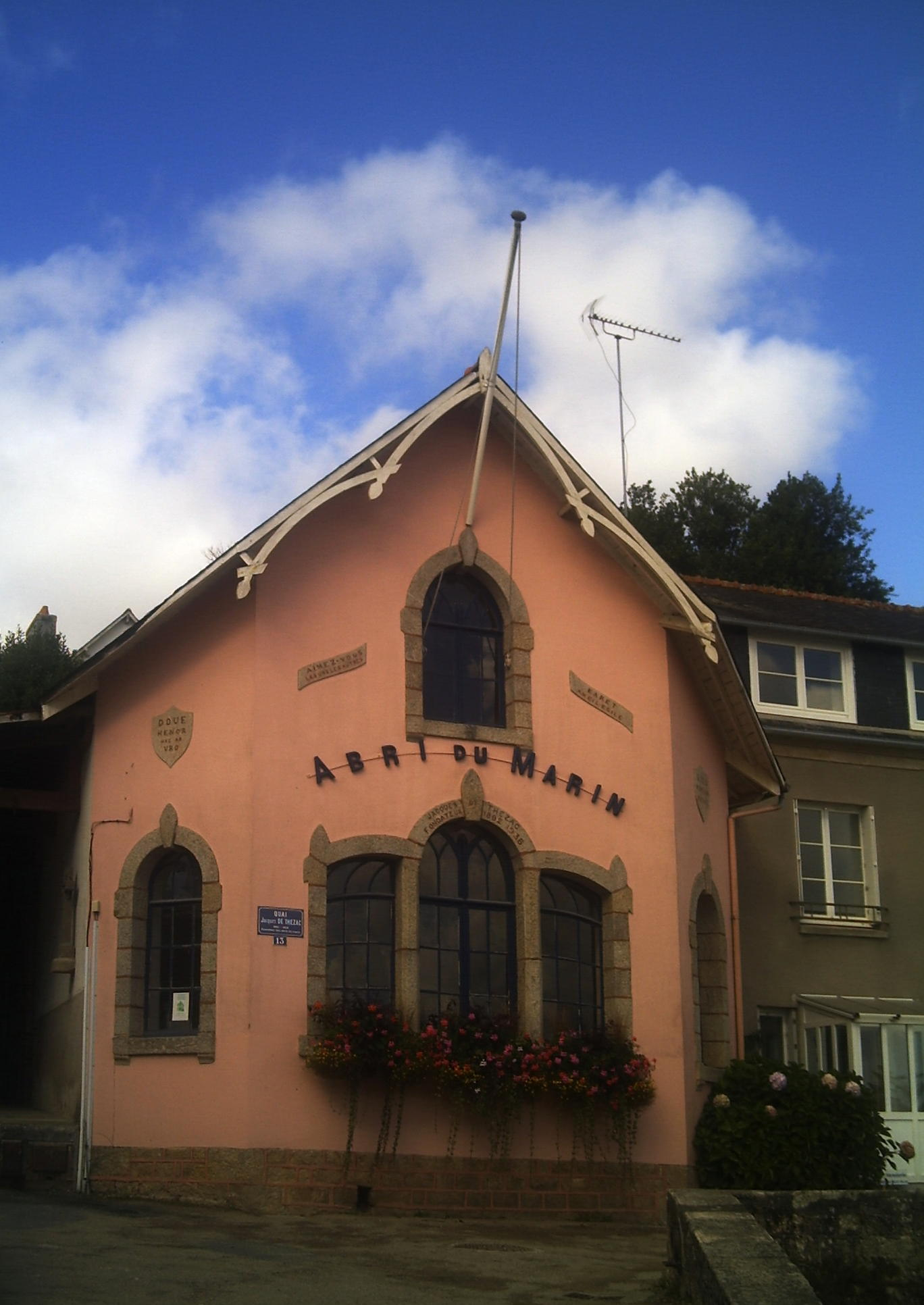
- L'Abri du Marin, in Combrit

- Coat of arms
- Location of Combrit
- Location within France Location within Brittany
- Coordinates: 47°53′16″N 4°09′32″W
- Country: France
- Region: Brittany
- Department: Finistère
- Arrondissement: Quimper
- Canton: Plonéour-Lanvern
- Intercommunality: Pays Bigouden Sud

Government
  - Mayor (2020–2026): Christian Loussouarn
- Area^{1}: 24.13 km^{2} (9.32 sq mi)
- Highest elevation: 62 m (203 ft)
- Lowest elevation: 0 m (0 ft)
- Population (2023): 4,265
  - Density: 176.8/km^{2} (457.8/sq mi)
- Time zone: UTC+01:00 (CET)
  - Summer (DST): UTC+02:00 (CEST)
- INSEE/Postal code: 29037 /29120
- ^{1} French Land Register data, which excludes lakes, ponds, glaciers > 1 km^{2} (0.386 sq mi or 247 acres) and river estuaries.

Combrit (Breton: Kombrid) is a commune in the Finistère department of Brittany in north-western France.

Artists such as Lucien Simon and Alfred Marzin painted many pictures of the area.

== Population ==
Inhabitants of Combrit are called in French Combritois.

Historical population

Year	Pop.	±% p.a.
1793	1,145	—
1800	1,392	+2.83%
1806	1,340	−0.63%
1821	1,516	+0.83%
1831	1,617	+0.65%
1836	1,640	+0.28%
1841	1,623	−0.21%
1846	1,696	+0.88%
1851	1,616	−0.96%
1856	1,650	+0.42%
1861	1,778	+1.51%
1866	1,836	+0.64%
1872	1,870	+0.31%
1876	2,108	+3.04%
1881	2,354	+2.23%
1886	2,390	+0.30%
1891	2,421	+0.26%
1896	2,553	+1.07%
1901	2,630	+0.60%

Year	Pop.	±% p.a.
1906	2,641	+0.08%
1911	2,760	+0.89%
1921	2,730	−0.11%
1926	2,628	−0.76%
1931	2,574	−0.41%
1936	2,442	−1.05%
1946	2,479	+0.15%
1954	2,292	−0.98%
1962	2,262	−0.16%
1968	2,233	−0.21%
1975	2,302	+0.44%
1982	2,495	+1.16%
1990	2,673	+0.87%
1999	3,165	+1.89%
2007	3,440	+1.05%
2012	3,731	+1.64%
2017	4,092	+1.86%
2023	4,265	+0.69%

Source: EHESS and INSEE (1968-2023)

== Breton language ==
The municipality launched a linguistic plan concerning the Breton language through Ya d'ar brezhoneg on 29 May 2008.

== Sights ==
- Parc botanique de Cornouaille

== See also ==
- Communes of the Finistère department
