= Tréméoc =

Tréméoc Tremeog
- Commune
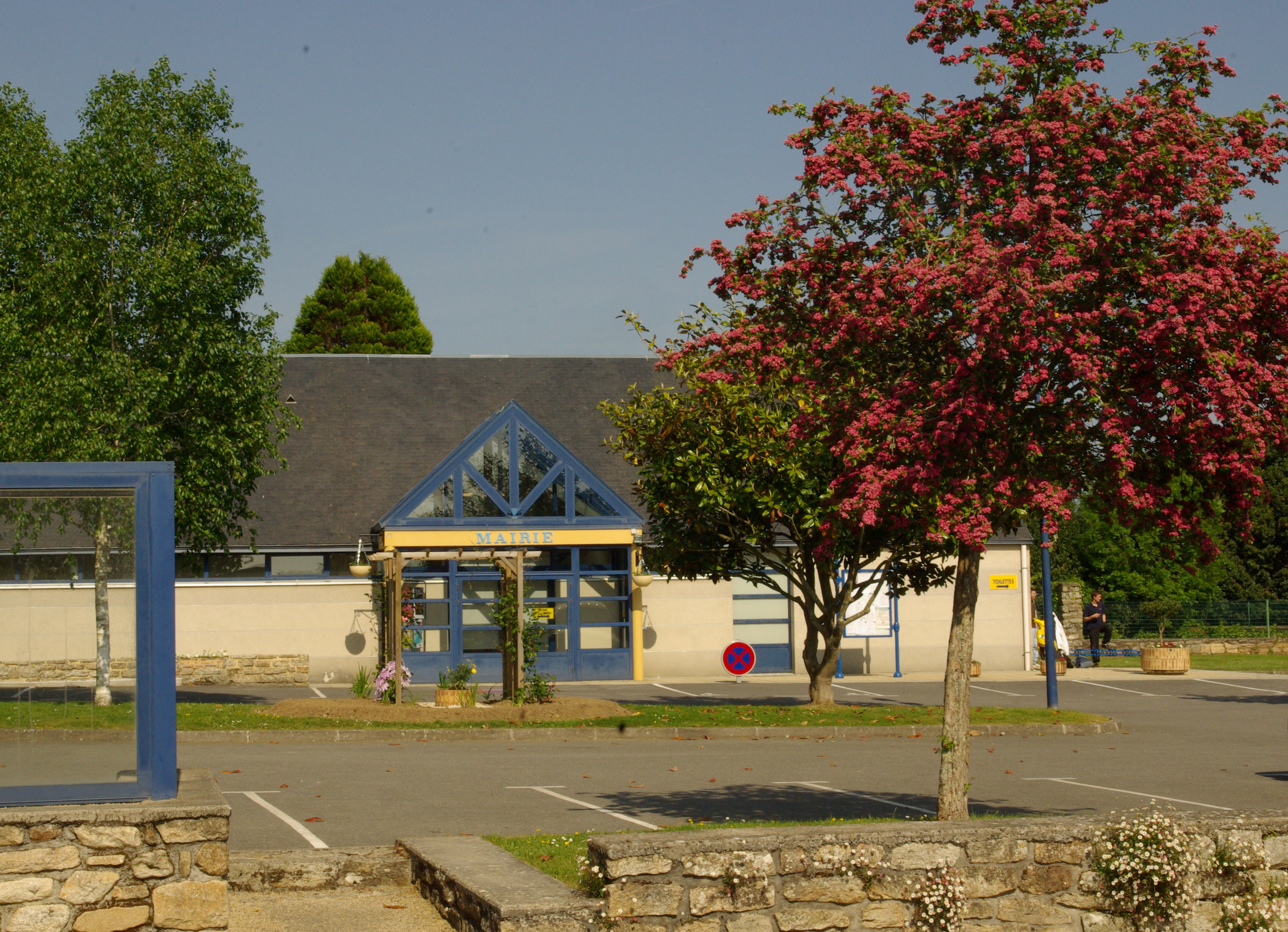
- The town hall in Tréméoc

- Coat of arms
- Location of Tréméoc
- Location within France Location within Brittany
- Coordinates: 47°54′22″N 4°12′39″W
- Country: France
- Region: Brittany
- Department: Finistère
- Arrondissement: Quimper
- Canton: Plonéour-Lanvern
- Intercommunality: Pays Bigouden Sud

Government
  - Mayor (2020–2026): Jean L'Helgouarc'h
- Area^{1}: 11.66 km^{2} (4.50 sq mi)
- Highest elevation: 66 m (217 ft)
- Lowest elevation: 5 m (16 ft)
- Population (2023): 1,503
  - Density: 128.9/km^{2} (333.9/sq mi)
- Time zone: UTC+01:00 (CET)
  - Summer (DST): UTC+02:00 (CEST)
- INSEE/Postal code: 29296 /29120
- ^{1} French Land Register data, which excludes lakes, ponds, glaciers > 1 km^{2} (0.386 sq mi or 247 acres) and river estuaries.

Tréméoc (French pronunciation: [tʁemeɔk]; Breton: Tremeog) is a commune in the Finistère department of Brittany in north-western France.

== Population ==
Inhabitants of Tréméoc are called in French Tréméocois.

== See also ==
- Communes of the Finistère department
