= Gourlizon =

Gourlizon Gourlizon
- Commune
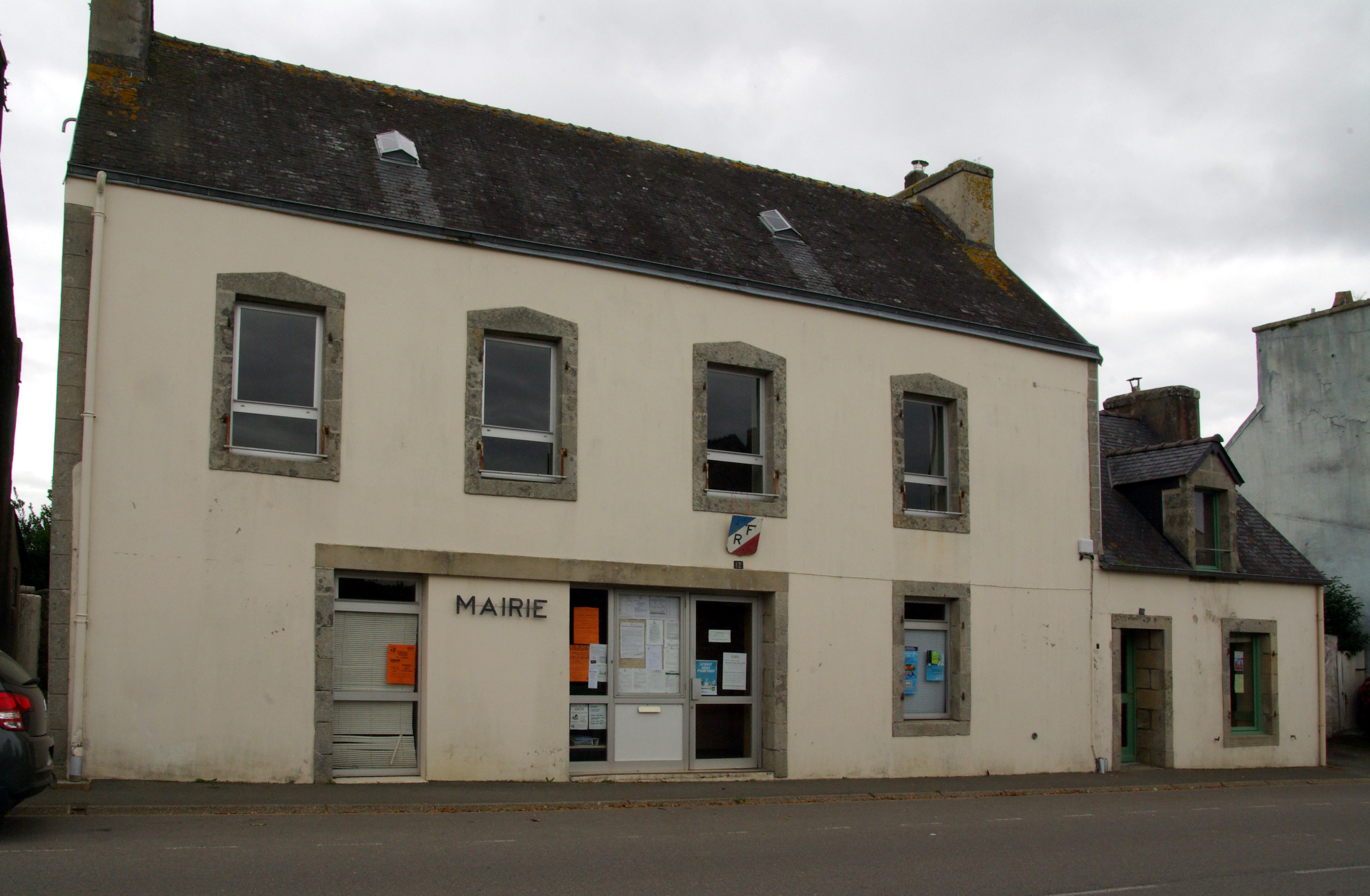
- The town hall in Gourlizon

- Coat of arms
- Location of Gourlizon
- Location within France Location within Brittany
- Coordinates: 48°01′14″N 4°15′56″W
- Country: France
- Region: Brittany
- Department: Finistère
- Arrondissement: Quimper
- Canton: Plonéour-Lanvern
- Intercommunality: Haut-Pays Bigouden

Government
  - Mayor (2024–2026): Olivier Pors
- Area^{1}: 9.91 km^{2} (3.83 sq mi)
- Highest elevation: 159 m (522 ft)
- Lowest elevation: 67 m (220 ft)
- Population (2023): 949
  - Density: 95.8/km^{2} (248/sq mi)
- Time zone: UTC+01:00 (CET)
  - Summer (DST): UTC+02:00 (CEST)
- INSEE/Postal code: 29065 /29710
- ^{1} French Land Register data, which excludes lakes, ponds, glaciers > 1 km^{2} (0.386 sq mi or 247 acres) and river estuaries.

Gourlizon (French pronunciation: [ɡuʁlizɔ̃]; Breton: Gourlizon) is a commune in the Finistère department of Brittany in north-western France.

== Population ==
Inhabitants of Gourlizon are called in French Gourlizonnais.

== See also ==
- Communes of the Finistère department
