= Plozévet =

Plozévet Plozeved
- Commune
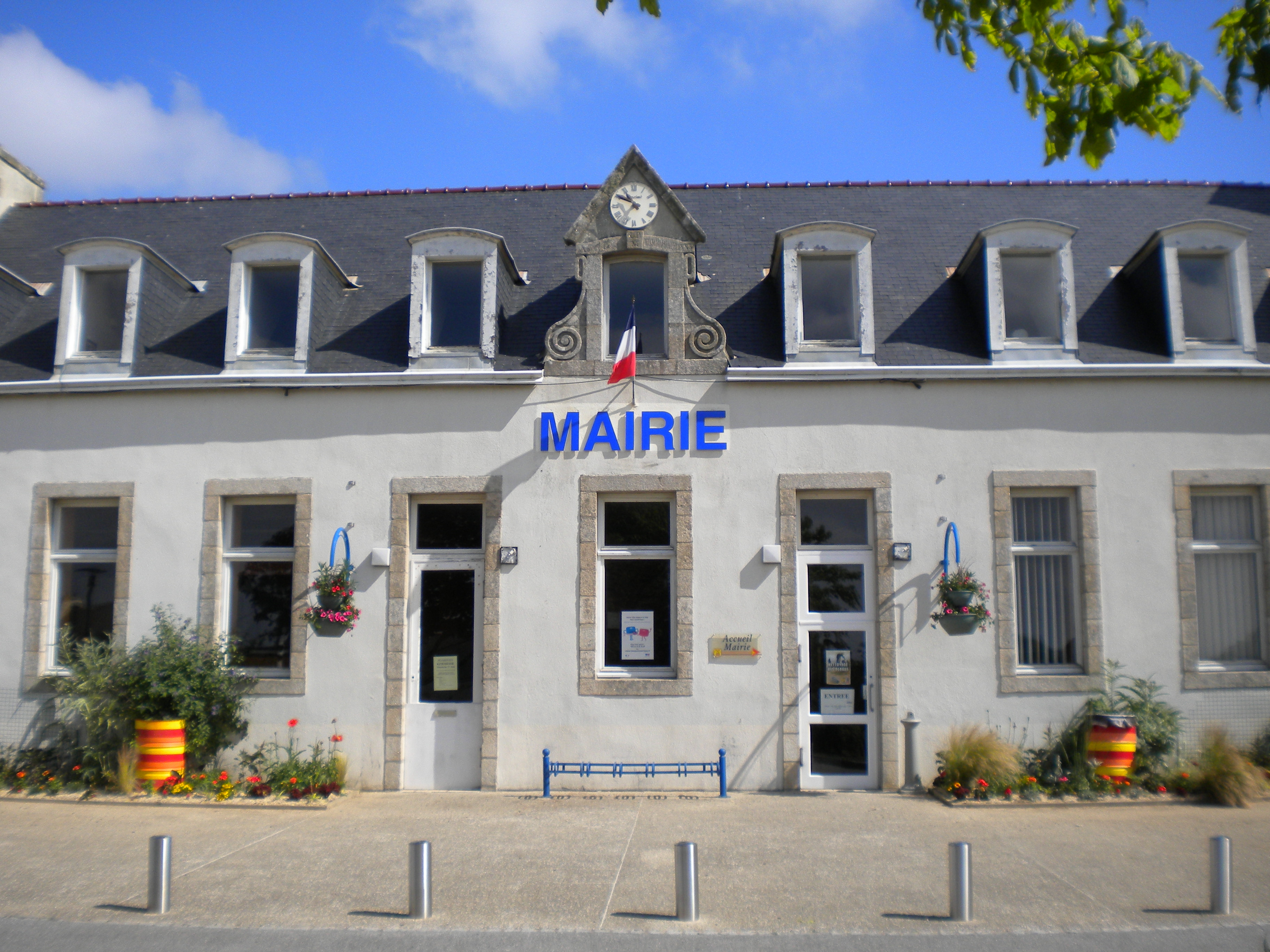
- Town hall

- Coat of arms
- Location of Plozévet
- Location within France Location within Brittany
- Coordinates: 47°59′15″N 4°25′26″W
- Country: France
- Region: Brittany
- Department: Finistère
- Arrondissement: Quimper
- Canton: Plonéour-Lanvern
- Intercommunality: Haut-Pays Bigouden

Government
  - Mayor (2020–2026): Gilles Kerezeon
- Area^{1}: 27.18 km^{2} (10.49 sq mi)
- Highest elevation: 97 m (318 ft)
- Lowest elevation: 0 m (0 ft)
- Population (2023): 2,984
  - Density: 109.8/km^{2} (284.3/sq mi)
- Time zone: UTC+01:00 (CET)
  - Summer (DST): UTC+02:00 (CEST)
- INSEE/Postal code: 29215 /29710
- ^{1} French Land Register data, which excludes lakes, ponds, glaciers > 1 km^{2} (0.386 sq mi or 247 acres) and river estuaries.

Plozévet (Breton: Plozeved) is a commune in the Finistère department of Brittany in north-western France. Plozévet is twinned with the village of Hartland, Devon, UK.

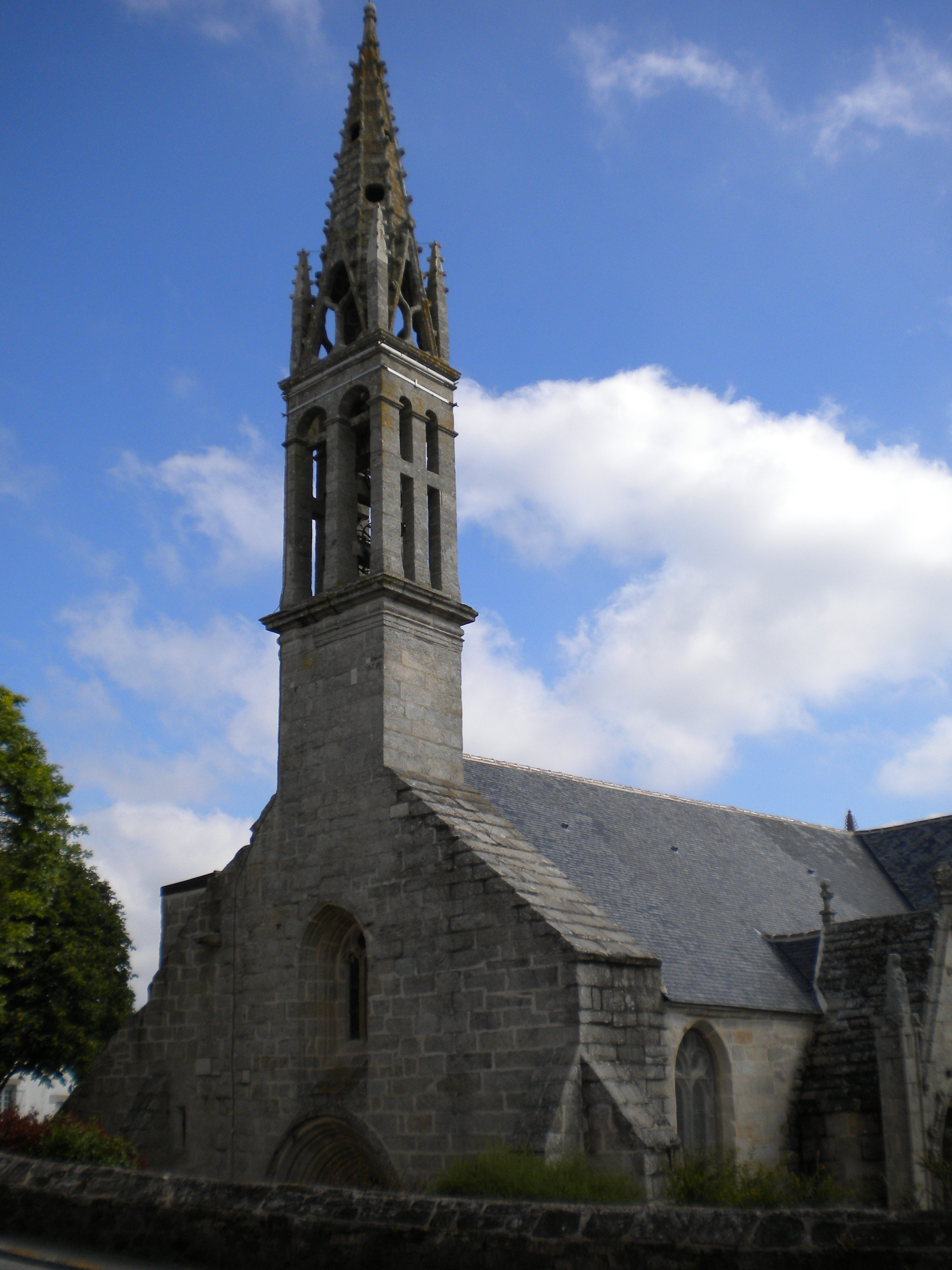

== Population ==
Inhabitants of Plozévet are called in French Plozévetiens.

Historical population
Year	Pop.	±% p.a.
1968	3,541	—
1975	3,249	−1.22%
1982	3,102	−0.66%
1990	2,838	−1.11%
1999	2,748	−0.36%
2007	2,921	+0.77%
2012	2,972	+0.35%
2017	2,967	−0.03%
2023	2,984	+0.10%
Source: INSEE

== Geography ==
Plozevet is a seaside town located 24 km (15 mi) west of Quimper. Historically it belongs to Cornouaille and Pays Bigouden.

== Map ==
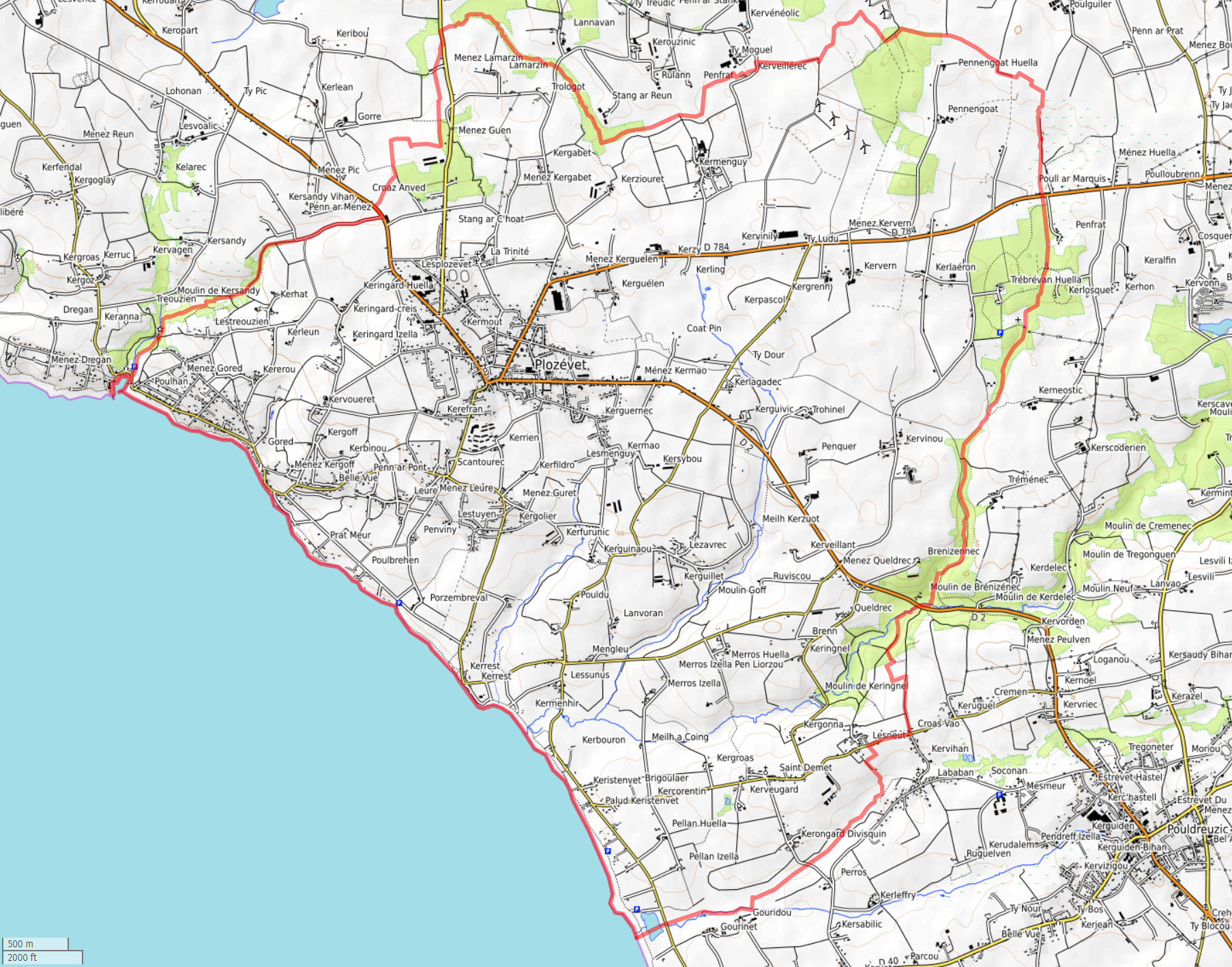
Topographic map.

== Breton language ==
The municipality launched a linguistic plan concerning the Breton language through Ya d'ar brezhoneg on 23 November 2007.

In 2008, 17.70% of primary-school children attended bilingual schools.

== See also ==
- Communes of the Finistère department
- The wreck of the Droits de l'Homme, 1797
