= Landudec =

Landudec Landudeg
- Commune
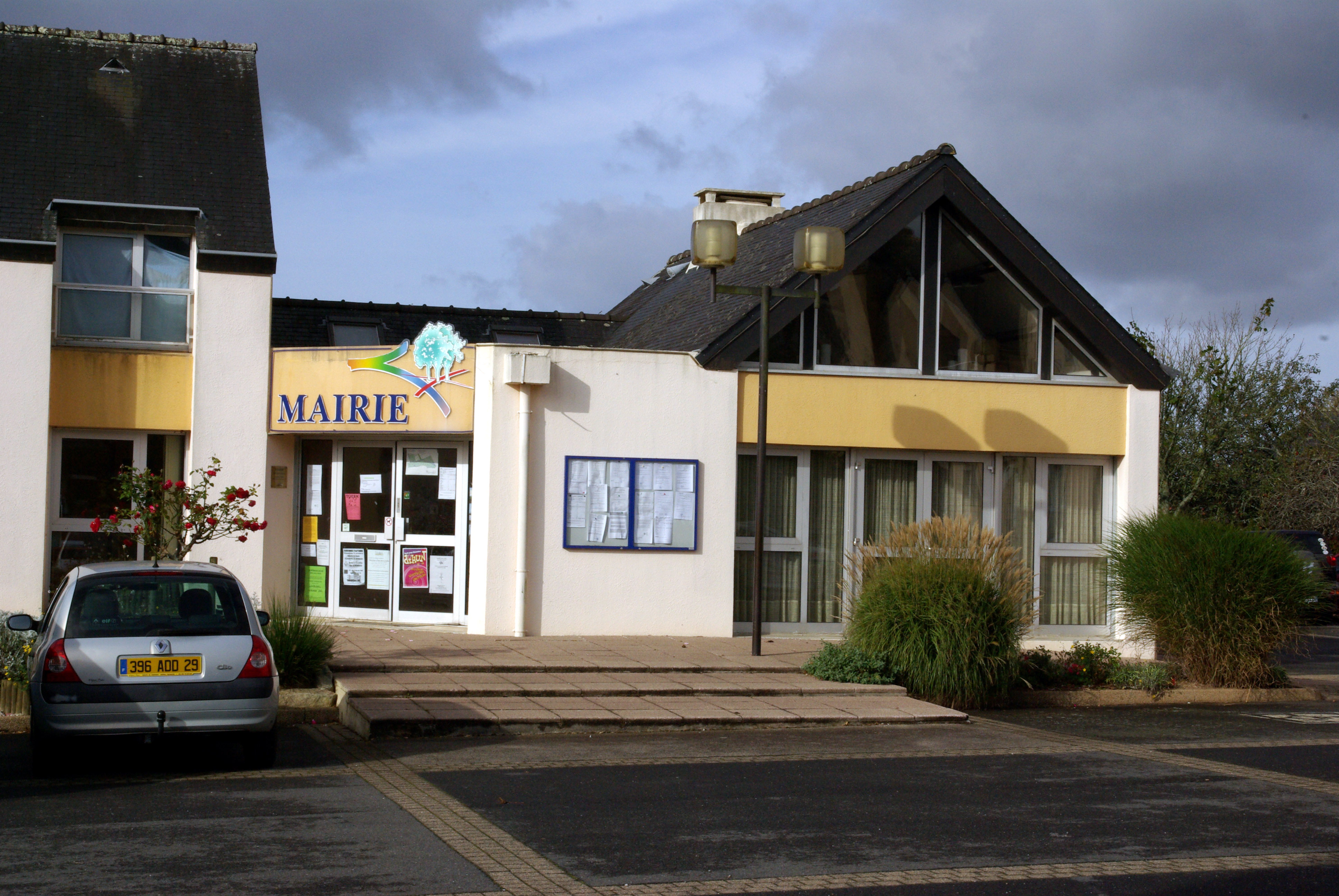
- The town hall in Landudec
- Location of Landudec
- Location within France Location within Brittany
- Coordinates: 48°00′04″N 4°20′07″W
- Country: France
- Region: Brittany
- Department: Finistère
- Arrondissement: Quimper
- Canton: Plonéour-Lanvern
- Intercommunality: Haut-Pays Bigouden

Government
  - Mayor (2020–2026): Yves Le Guellec
- Area^{1}: 20.56 km^{2} (7.94 sq mi)
- Highest elevation: 131 m (430 ft)
- Lowest elevation: 33 m (108 ft)
- Population (2023): 1,459
  - Density: 70.96/km^{2} (183.8/sq mi)
- Time zone: UTC+01:00 (CET)
  - Summer (DST): UTC+02:00 (CEST)
- INSEE/Postal code: 29108 /29710
- ^{1} French Land Register data, which excludes lakes, ponds, glaciers > 1 km^{2} (0.386 sq mi or 247 acres) and river estuaries.

Landudec (French pronunciation: [lɑ̃dydɛk]; Breton: Landudeg) is a commune in the Finistère department of Brittany in north-western France.

== Population ==
Inhabitants of Landudec are called Landudecois.

== See also ==
- Communes of the Finistère department
