= Île-Tudy =

Île-Tudy Enez-Tudi
- Commune
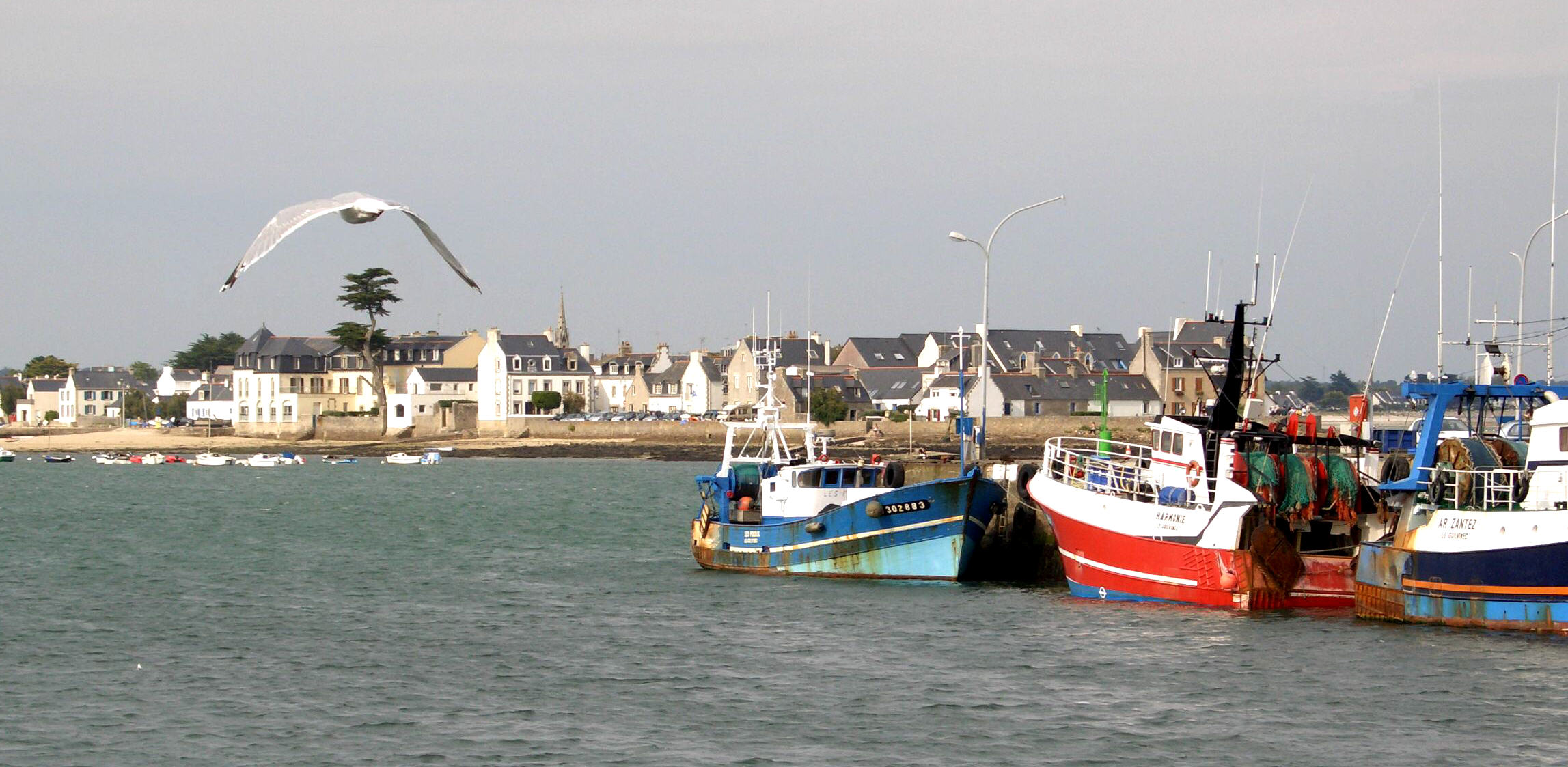
- Île-Tudy, from Loctudy
- Location of Île-Tudy
- Location within France Location within Brittany
- Coordinates: 47°50′36″N 4°10′01″W
- Country: France
- Region: Brittany
- Department: Finistère
- Arrondissement: Quimper
- Canton: Plonéour-Lanvern
- Intercommunality: Pays Bigouden Sud

Government
  - Mayor (2020–2026): Éric Jousseaume
- Area^{1}: 1.26 km^{2} (0.49 sq mi)
- Highest elevation: 5 m (16 ft)
- Lowest elevation: 0 m (0 ft)
- Population (2023): 742
  - Density: 589/km^{2} (1,530/sq mi)
- Time zone: UTC+01:00 (CET)
  - Summer (DST): UTC+02:00 (CEST)
- INSEE/Postal code: 29085 /29980
- ^{1} French Land Register data, which excludes lakes, ponds, glaciers > 1 km^{2} (0.386 sq mi or 247 acres) and river estuaries.

Île-Tudy (French pronunciation: [il tydi]; Breton: Enez-Tudi) is a commune in the Finistère department of Brittany in northwestern France.

== Population ==
Inhabitants of Île-Tudy are called in French Îliens.

== History ==
The United States Navy established a naval air station on 14 March 1918 to operate seaplanes during World War I. The base closed shortly after the First Armistice at Compiègne.

== See also ==
- Communes of the Finistère department
