= Tréguennec =

Tréguennec Tregeneg
- Commune
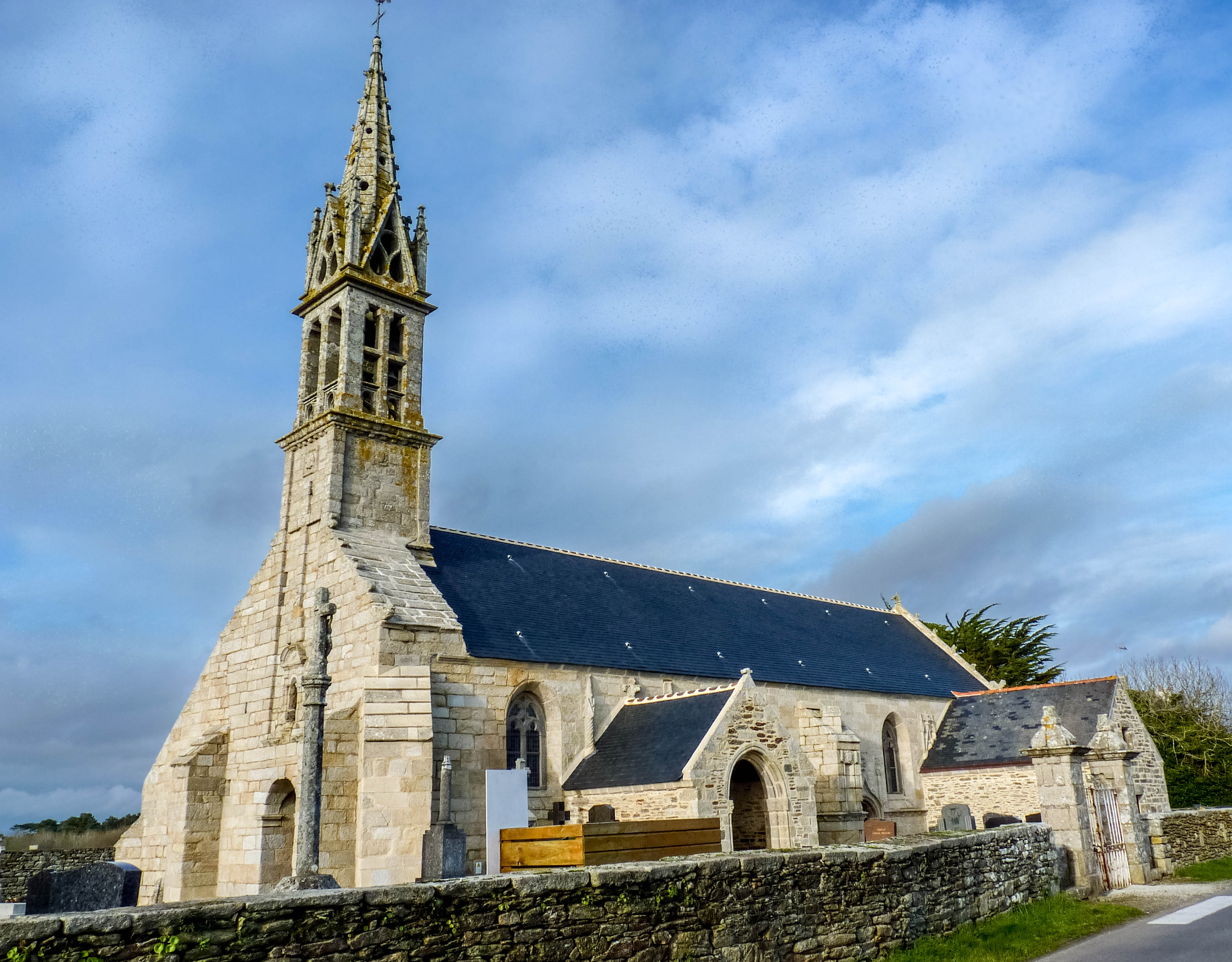
- The parish church of Our Lady of Mercy

- Coat of arms
- Location of Tréguennec
- Location within France Location within Brittany
- Coordinates: 47°53′32″N 4°19′56″W
- Country: France
- Region: Brittany
- Department: Finistère
- Arrondissement: Quimper
- Canton: Plonéour-Lanvern
- Intercommunality: Pays Bigouden Sud

Government
  - Mayor (2020–2026): Stéphane Morel
- Area^{1}: 9.61 km^{2} (3.71 sq mi)
- Highest elevation: 53 m (174 ft)
- Lowest elevation: 0 m (0 ft)
- Population (2023): 311
  - Density: 32.4/km^{2} (83.8/sq mi)
- Time zone: UTC+01:00 (CET)
  - Summer (DST): UTC+02:00 (CEST)
- INSEE/Postal code: 29292 /29720
- ^{1} French Land Register data, which excludes lakes, ponds, glaciers > 1 km^{2} (0.386 sq mi or 247 acres) and river estuaries.

Tréguennec (French pronunciation: [tʁeɡɛnɛk]; Breton: Tregeneg) is a commune in the Finistère department of Brittany in north-western France.

== Population ==
Inhabitants of Tréguennec are called in French Tréguennecois.

The Chapelle de Saint-Vio is named after Saint Vouga.

== See also ==
- Communes of the Finistère department
- List of the works of the Maître de Plougastel
