= Plovan =

Plovan Plovan
- Commune
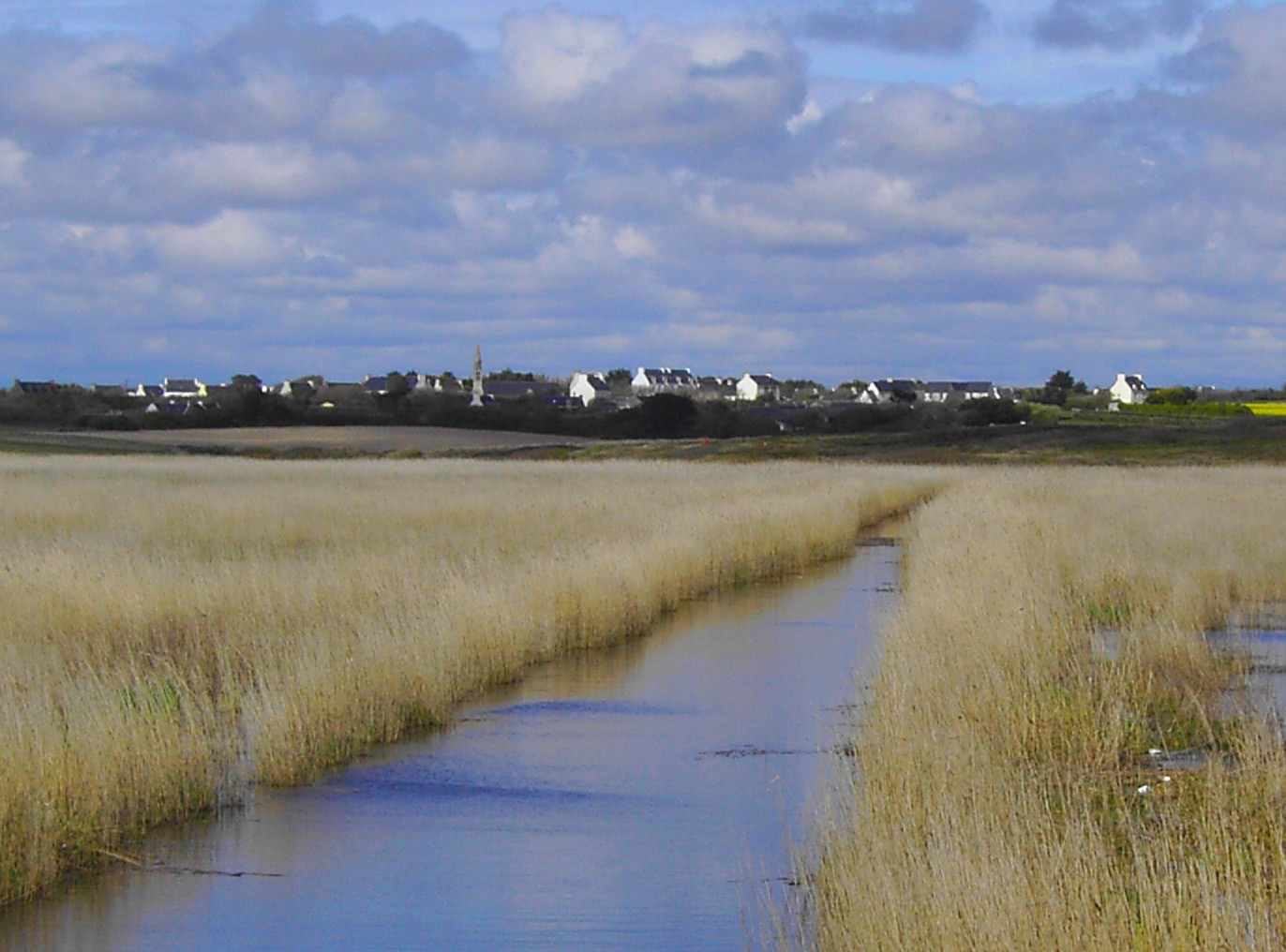
- A distant view of Plovan, from the tidal marshes of the Bay of Audierne.

- Coat of arms
- Location of Plovan
- Location within France Location within Brittany
- Coordinates: 47°55′00″N 4°21′41″W
- Country: France
- Region: Brittany
- Department: Finistère
- Arrondissement: Quimper
- Canton: Plonéour-Lanvern
- Intercommunality: Haut-Pays Bigouden

Government
  - Mayor (2020–2026): Dominique Andro
- Area^{1}: 15.75 km^{2} (6.08 sq mi)
- Highest elevation: 85 m (279 ft)
- Lowest elevation: 0 m (0 ft)
- Population (2023): 677
  - Density: 43.0/km^{2} (111/sq mi)
- Time zone: UTC+01:00 (CET)
  - Summer (DST): UTC+02:00 (CEST)
- INSEE/Postal code: 29214 /29720
- ^{1} French Land Register data, which excludes lakes, ponds, glaciers > 1 km^{2} (0.386 sq mi or 247 acres) and river estuaries.

Plovan (French pronunciation: [plɔvɑ̃]; Breton: Plovan) is a commune in the Finistère department of Brittany in north-western France.

== Population ==
Inhabitants of Plovan are called in French Plovanais.

== See also ==
- Communes of the Finistère department
