= Plonéour-Lanvern =

Plonéour-Lanvern Ploneour-Lanwern
- Commune
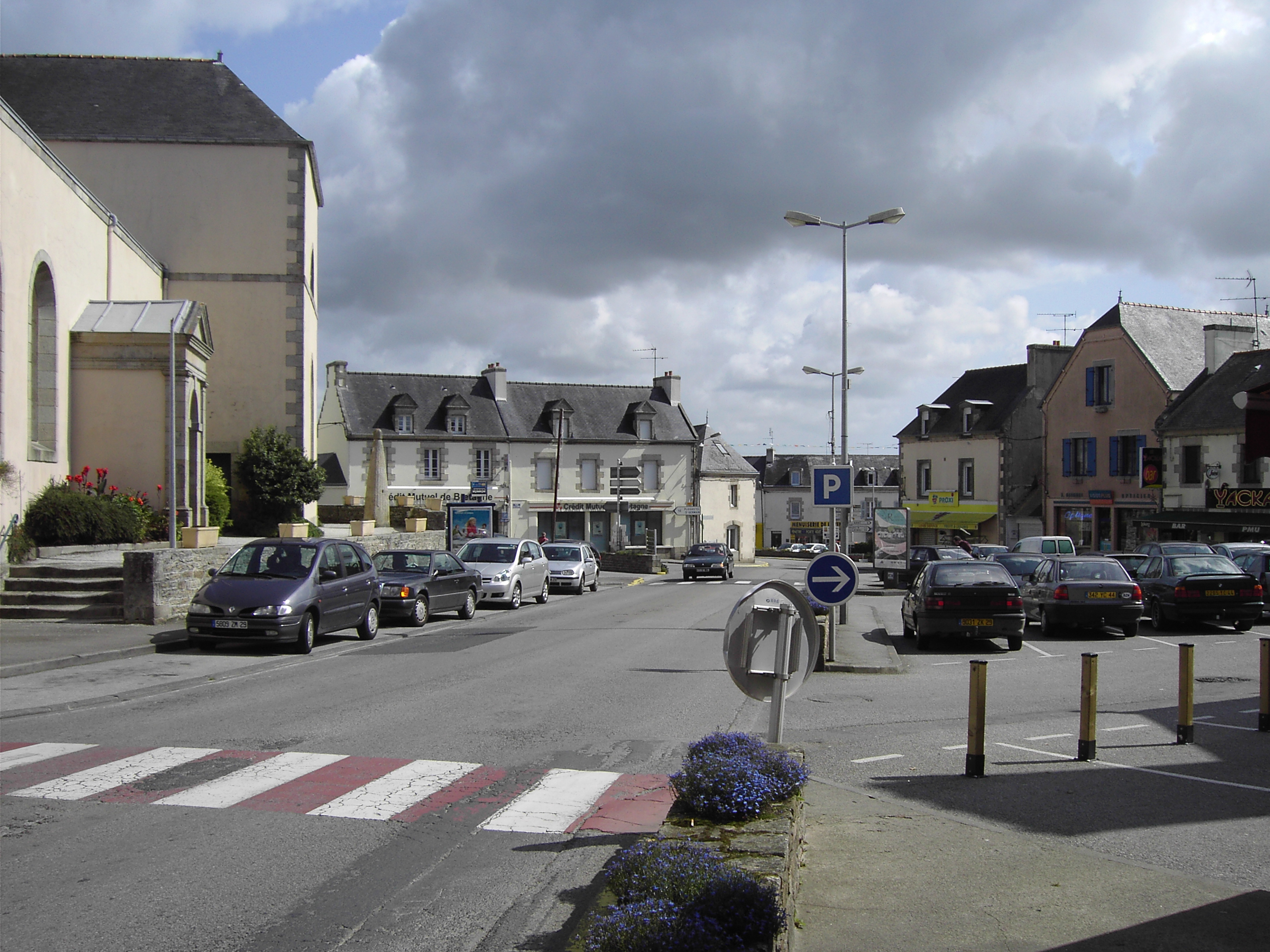
- The centre of Plonéour-Lanvern

- Coat of arms
- Location of Plonéour-Lanvern
- Location within France Location within Brittany
- Coordinates: 47°54′13″N 4°16′57″W
- Country: France
- Region: Brittany
- Department: Finistère
- Arrondissement: Quimper
- Canton: Plonéour-Lanvern
- Intercommunality: Haut-Pays Bigouden

Government
  - Mayor (2020–2026): Josiane Kerloc'h
- Area^{1}: 48.91 km^{2} (18.88 sq mi)
- Highest elevation: 91 m (299 ft)
- Lowest elevation: 1 m (3.3 ft)
- Population (2023): 6,452
  - Density: 131.9/km^{2} (341.7/sq mi)
- Time zone: UTC+01:00 (CET)
  - Summer (DST): UTC+02:00 (CEST)
- INSEE/Postal code: 29174 /29720
- ^{1} French Land Register data, which excludes lakes, ponds, glaciers > 1 km^{2} (0.386 sq mi or 247 acres) and river estuaries.

Plonéour-Lanvern (French pronunciation: [plɔneuʁ lɑ̃vɛʁn]; Breton: Ploneour-Lanwern) is a commune in the Finistère department of Brittany in north-western France.

== Toponymy and originate ==
The name Plonéour means in Breton Saint Enéour's plou (parish), to which was added the name of Lanvern (which comes from the Breton lan (hermitage) and of the name Wern or Guern which means swamp of alders) when this former(old) parish was connected with the municipality recently created by Plonéour in 1793. The legend says that the menhir which raises itself (draws up itself) on the central place(square) of Plonéour-Lanvern would be the mast of the boat which would have brought saint Enéour of Great Britain in Cornouaille.

The Breton name of the municipality is Ploneour-Lanwern.

== Geography ==
=== The River of Pont-l'abbé and the stretch of water of the New Mill ===
The River of Pont-l'abbot rises near Kerfioret, in the municipal limit between Landudec and Plogastel-Saint-Germain, in passer-by in the West-southwest of the village of this last municipality. His paying pond has a total surface of 135 km^{2}. Flowing initially in the direction of the southeast, she turns then due south, passing between Peumerit and Plonéour-Lanvern on the West and Tréméoc in the East. His course (its average flow, measured to Trémillec, is then 504 liters of water per second) is then blocked by a dike (the concrete dam, built in 1976-1977, is 140 meters in length and is 6,8 meters high) which gives birth to a pond, the "Stretch of water of the New Mill", fed also by the brooks of Lanvern(Who the average debit flow, measured to Ty-Poës, is 165 liters of water per second); this stretch of water, managed by the Association of local authorities of the Country Bigouden headdress the South, has a surface of 55 ha and is situated in 13 meters in height; he has a storage capacity of a million of m^{3} of water and serves as drinking water tank for a large part of the Country Bigouden headdress; the intake of water of Pen Enez feeds the water treatment plant of Bringall.

Downstream to this stretch of water the small coastal river takes a course in the direction of the southeast until Pont-l'Abbé. In the past, numerous mills became established along his course. Among them, of upstream towards the approva, the Mill of Quiliou (the Mill of Hilguy is situated on a tributary) in Plogastel-Saint-Germain, the Mill Trévan and the New Mill in Peumerit (the Mill Troyon The Mill Maréguez is situated on a tributary), (too in Plogastel-Saint-Germain), the Mill of Callac, the Mill of Fao, the Mill of Trémillec and the New Mill as well as, situated on the brooks of Lanvern, the mills of Lanvern and Kerbénoc' an hour in Plonéour-Lanvern, the mill Hascoet (situated on a tributary) in Pont-l'Abbé.

== Population ==
Inhabitants of Plonéour-Lanvern are called in French Plonéouristes.

Historical population

Year	Pop.	±% p.a.
1793	1,897	—
1800	1,968	+0.53%
1806	2,009	+0.34%
1821	2,054	+0.15%
1831	2,892	+3.48%
1836	3,025	+0.90%
1841	3,193	+1.09%
1846	3,200	+0.04%
1851	3,033	−1.07%
1856	3,101	+0.44%
1861	3,238	+0.87%
1866	3,308	+0.43%
1872	3,147	−0.83%
1876	3,360	+1.65%
1881	3,420	+0.35%
1886	3,717	+1.68%
1891	3,780	+0.34%
1896	3,860	+0.42%
1901	3,770	−0.47%

Year	Pop.	±% p.a.
1906	3,925	+0.81%
1911	4,103	+0.89%
1921	4,247	+0.35%
1926	4,536	+1.33%
1931	4,375	−0.72%
1936	4,281	−0.43%
1946	4,130	−0.36%
1954	4,040	−0.28%
1962	4,208	+0.51%
1968	4,087	−0.49%
1975	4,364	+0.94%
1982	4,508	+0.46%
1990	4,619	+0.30%
1999	4,800	+0.43%
2007	5,511	+1.74%
2012	6,004	+1.73%
2017	6,064	+0.20%
2023	6,452	+1.04%

Source: EHESS and INSEE (1968-2023)

== See also ==
- Communes of the Finistère department
