= Pouldreuzic =

Pouldreuzic Pouldreuzig
- Commune
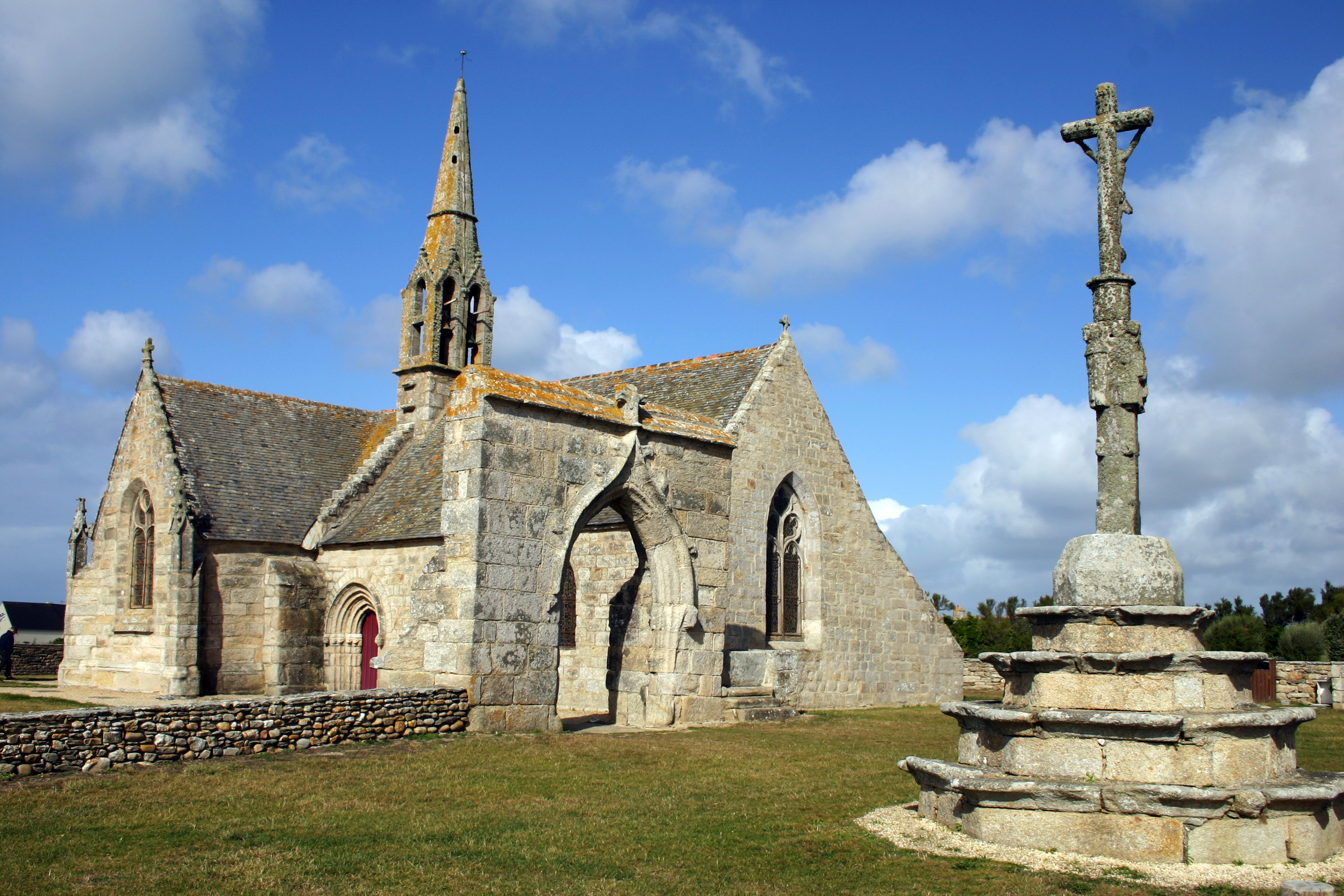
- The chapel and calvary of Our Lady of Penhors
- Location of Pouldreuzic
- Location within France Location within Brittany
- Coordinates: 47°57′21″N 4°21′33″W
- Country: France
- Region: Brittany
- Department: Finistère
- Arrondissement: Quimper
- Canton: Plonéour-Lanvern
- Intercommunality: Haut-Pays Bigouden

Government
  - Mayor (2020–2026): Philippe Ronarc'h
- Area^{1}: 16.75 km^{2} (6.47 sq mi)
- Highest elevation: 91 m (299 ft)
- Lowest elevation: 2 m (6.6 ft)
- Population (2023): 2,119
  - Density: 126.5/km^{2} (327.7/sq mi)
- Time zone: UTC+01:00 (CET)
  - Summer (DST): UTC+02:00 (CEST)
- INSEE/Postal code: 29225 /29710
- ^{1} French Land Register data, which excludes lakes, ponds, glaciers > 1 km^{2} (0.386 sq mi or 247 acres) and river estuaries.

Pouldreuzic (French pronunciation: [puldʁøzik]; Breton: Pouldreuzig, [pulˈdrøːzik]) is a commune in the Finistère department, Brittany, northwestern France.

The writer Pêr-Jakez Helias was born and lived here; the "Maison de Pierre-Jakez Hélias" is now a museum: an early 20th-century house illustrating the writer's daily life.

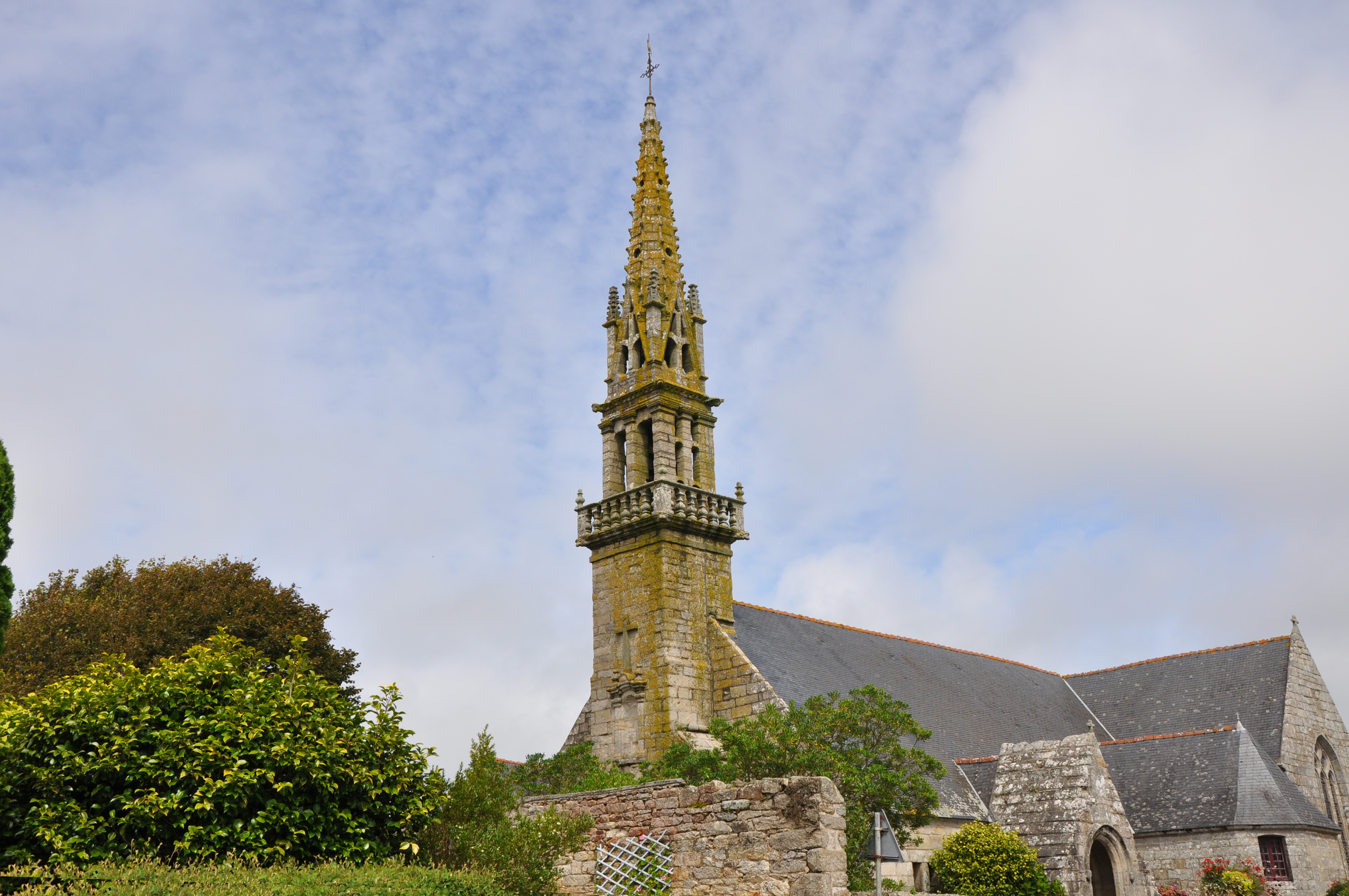
The church of St Faron

There are historic churches of St Faron and Lababan and the chapel of Our Lady of Penhors. Also in the commune is the Musée de l'Amiral.

== Population ==
Inhabitants of Pouldreuzic are called in French Pouldreuzicois.

Historical population
Year	Pop.	±% p.a.
1968	2,232	—
1975	2,141	−0.59%
1982	2,024	−0.80%
1990	1,854	−1.09%
1999	1,814	−0.24%
2007	1,820	+0.04%
2012	2,087	+2.78%
2017	2,156	+0.65%
2023	2,119	−0.29%
Source: INSEE

== See also ==
- Communes of the Finistère department
