= Peumerit =

Peumerit Purid
- Commune
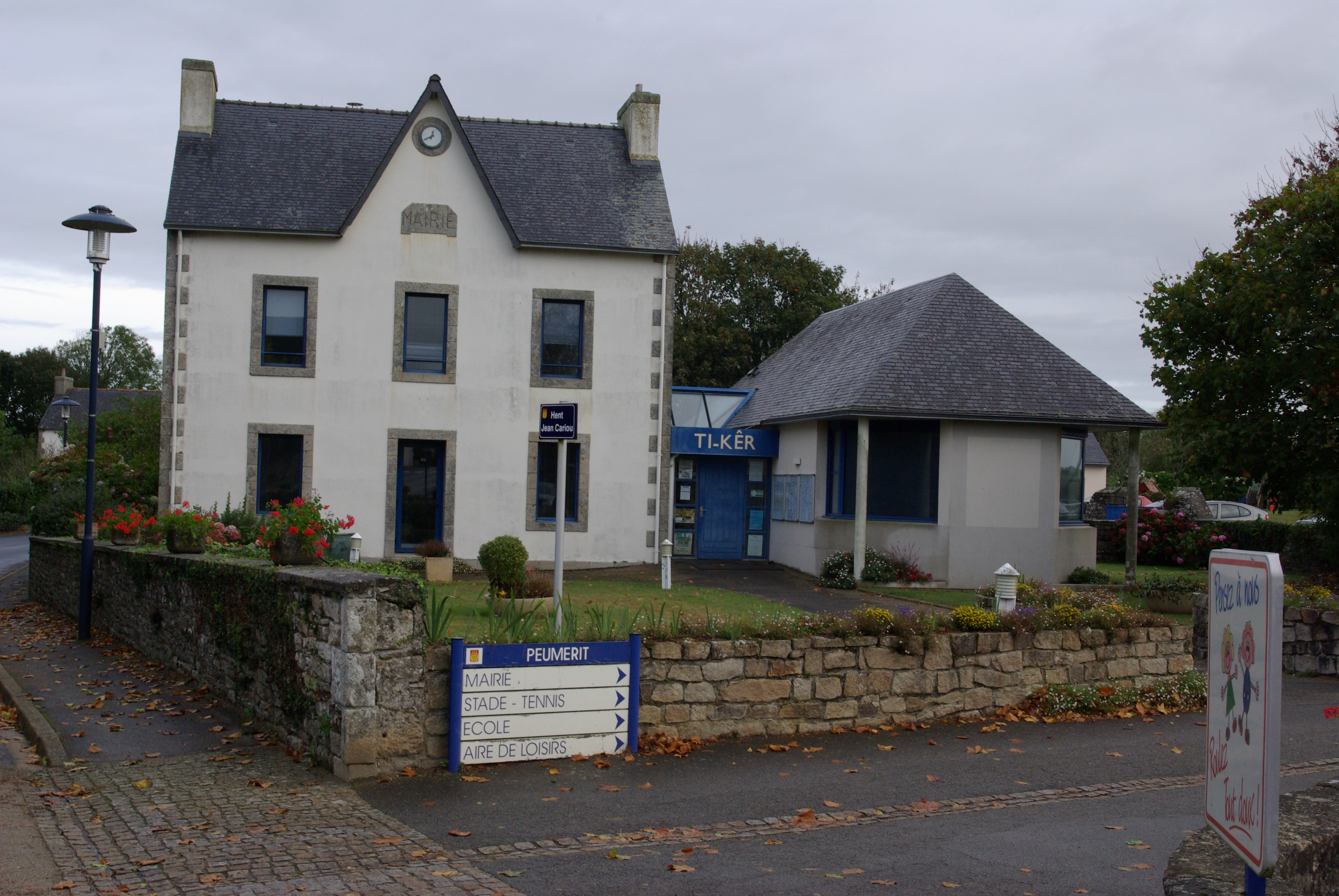
- The town hall in Peumerit.

- Coat of arms
- Location of Peumerit
- Location within France Location within Brittany
- Coordinates: 47°56′22″N 4°18′29″W
- Country: France
- Region: Brittany
- Department: Finistère
- Arrondissement: Quimper
- Canton: Plonéour-Lanvern
- Intercommunality: Haut-Pays Bigouden

Government
  - Mayor (2020–2026): Jean-Louis Caradec
- Area^{1}: 19.59 km^{2} (7.56 sq mi)
- Highest elevation: 127 m (417 ft)
- Lowest elevation: 6 m (20 ft)
- Population (2023): 917
  - Density: 46.8/km^{2} (121/sq mi)
- Time zone: UTC+01:00 (CET)
  - Summer (DST): UTC+02:00 (CEST)
- INSEE/Postal code: 29159 /29710
- ^{1} French Land Register data, which excludes lakes, ponds, glaciers > 1 km^{2} (0.386 sq mi or 247 acres) and river estuaries.

Peumerit (French pronunciation: [pømʁit]; Breton: Purid), formerly Peumérit, is a commune in the Finistère department of Brittany in north-western France. Peumerit is characterized by a temperate oceanic climate, with variations in classification highlighting both relatively mild seasonal conditions and high precipitation.

== Geography ==
The commune covers 19.59 square kilometres (7.56 sq mi). In 2010, the commune was classified as having a typical oceanic climate, based on a study by the CNRS using data from the period 1971–2000. In 2020, Météo-France published a typology of metropolitan France's climates in which the commune is described as having an oceanic climate, situated within the climatic region of eastern and southern Brittany, Pays Nantais, and Vendée, characterized by low summer rainfall and good levels of sunshine. That same year, the Brittany Environmental Observatory released a climate zoning map of the Brittany region based on 2009 data from Météo-France. According to this classification, the commune lies within the Monts d'Arrée zone, marked by cold winters, mild summers, and heavy precipitation.

== Demographics ==
The population as of 2023 was 917. Historical figures show some fluctuations: 884 residents in 1968, 663 in 1999, and 807 in 2012. According to the 2022 census, 67.69% of the population was between the ages of 15 and 64, 20.02% were under 15 years old, and 12.28% were aged 65 and over.

== See also ==
- Communes of the Finistère department
- Jacques Cariou, Olympic gold medalist from Peumerit and namesake of town sports stadium
