= List of the works of the atelier of the Maître de Tronoën =

This is a listing/catalogue raisonné of the works of the atelier or workshop of the Maître de Tronoën. It includes calvaries and crosses, individual pietà and some miscellaneous items.

== Calvaries and crosses ==
The atelier are best known for their calvaries and that at Saint-Jean-Trolimon is one of the best known in Brittany.

One practice peculiar to the atelier was the adding of so-called "anges de douceur" to their pietàs and crucifixes. These angels would either try to make Mary more comfortable by lifting the edges of her veil away from her forehead, touch or arrange a lock of Jesus' hair, or make some other comforting tactile gesture. In the descriptions below the presence of such "anges de douceur" is mentioned. .

Type of sculpture	Location	Description|Notes
Grand calvary- Calvaire de Tronoēn	Saint-Jean-Trolimon	See Calvary at Tronoën. This is the atelier's best known work. Saint Veronica holds out her veil now bearing Jesus' image. Part of the Calvaire de Tronoēn
Remains of a calvary	Collorec	The Église Notre-Dame has the remains of a granite calvary discovered buried in the cemetery in 1994 and attributed to the atelier. On what amounts to blocks of stone are carvings depicting the crucifixion, the Virgin Mary and John the Evangelist, a pietà and the good and bad robbers. The blocks are badly worn but there are two winged angels depicted in the pietà which stands outside the church fixed to a post. They hold the edges of Mary's veil away from her forehead and help support Jesus' head and knee. The side of the block featuring the crucifixion is damaged and Jesus' head is missing. At his feet there is another angel holding a chalice. At the base of the block are two coats of arms one of the Trefflec'h family. The "Croix du bourg" in Collorec dates to 1468 and is also attributed to the atelier. The Collorec calvary
Calvary known as "Calvaire Croas-an-Teurec"	Saint-Goazec	For this calvary the atelier are attributed with both crucifix and pietà. The winged angel above Jesus' head in the crucifix is lifting a lock of Jesus' hair from his forehead whilst a second but wingless angel kneels at his feet holding a chalice presumably to collect his blood. On the reverse side Mary sits with Jesus' dead body across her knees (the classic "Vierge de Pitié"), but there are no angels in attendance.
Calvary known as the "Calvaire de Kerbreudeur"	Saint-Hernin	For this calvary the atelier carved several bas-reliefs in five panels at the base. These panels are positioned around a rectangular base arranged in such a way that a niche has been created in the base's centre. Above this rectangular base are a cross and statues of the good and bad robbers. The central cross is not attributed to the atelier. On the first level of the base and next to the good robber is the pietà. The niche itself contains several panels and others are placed just outside. The relief panel depicting the nativity and the Adoration of the Magi is located just outside the niche and inside the niche and on the left is the scene depicting the Baptism of Christ. At the base of the niche is the scene depicting the resurrection and next to this and on the right is the scene depicting Adam and Eve's expulsion from paradise. On the right and just outside the niche is a panel depicting Catherine of Alexandria and Saint Michael. Just under the niche are three further scenes. At the front is a scene depicting Christ carrying the cross and to the left of this is a scene showing the Flagellation and to the right John the Evangelist comforting the Virgin Mary. The atelier used granite from Scaër . Parts of the pietà are now missing. This is a very important work by the atelier and in the gallery below are several photographs of the bas-relief panels.

== Images of the Kerbreudeur calvary ==
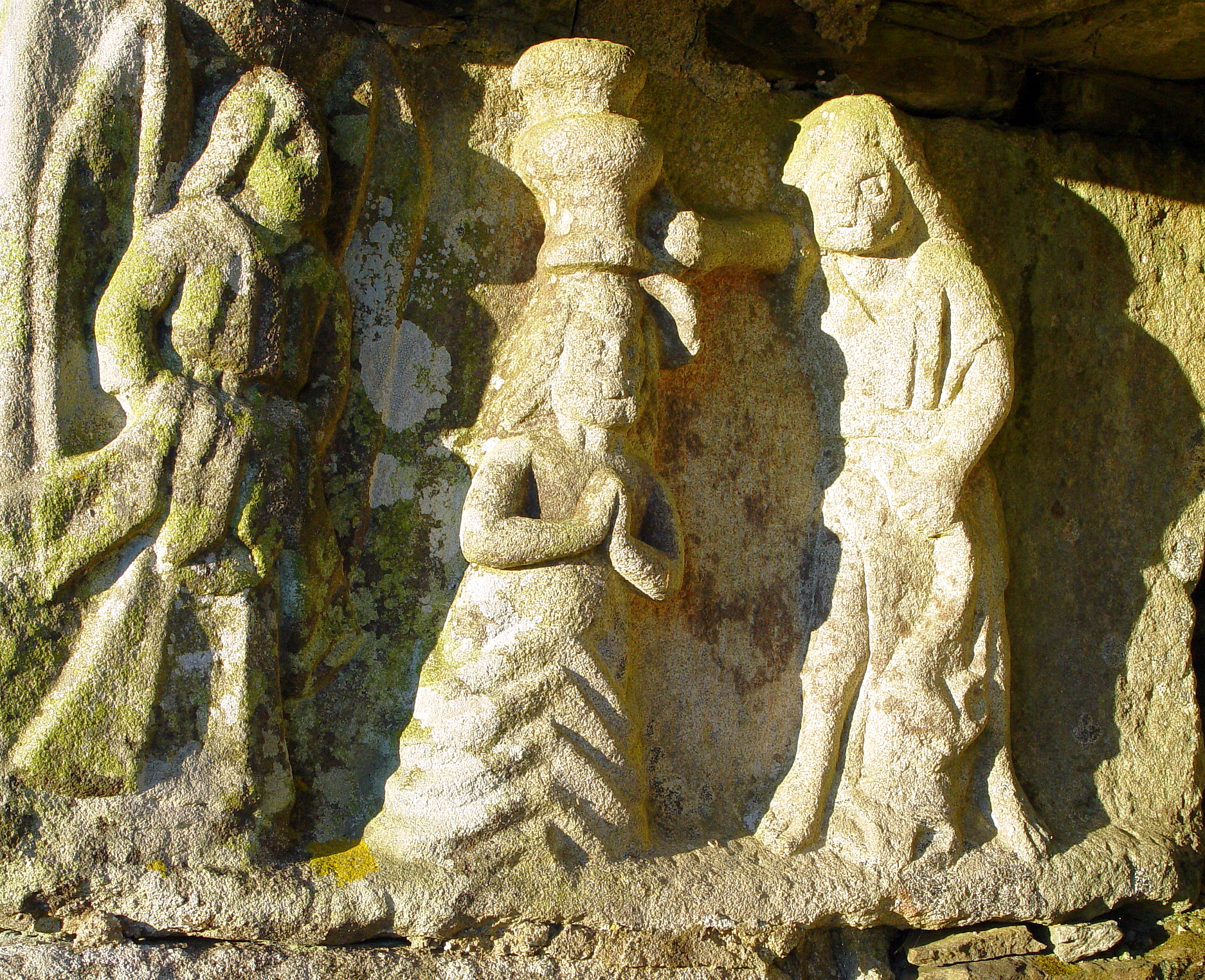
The baptism scene in the niche of the Kerbreudeur calvary. Three people are depicted, Jesus, John the Baptist and an angel who holds Jesus' robe whilst the baptism takes place.

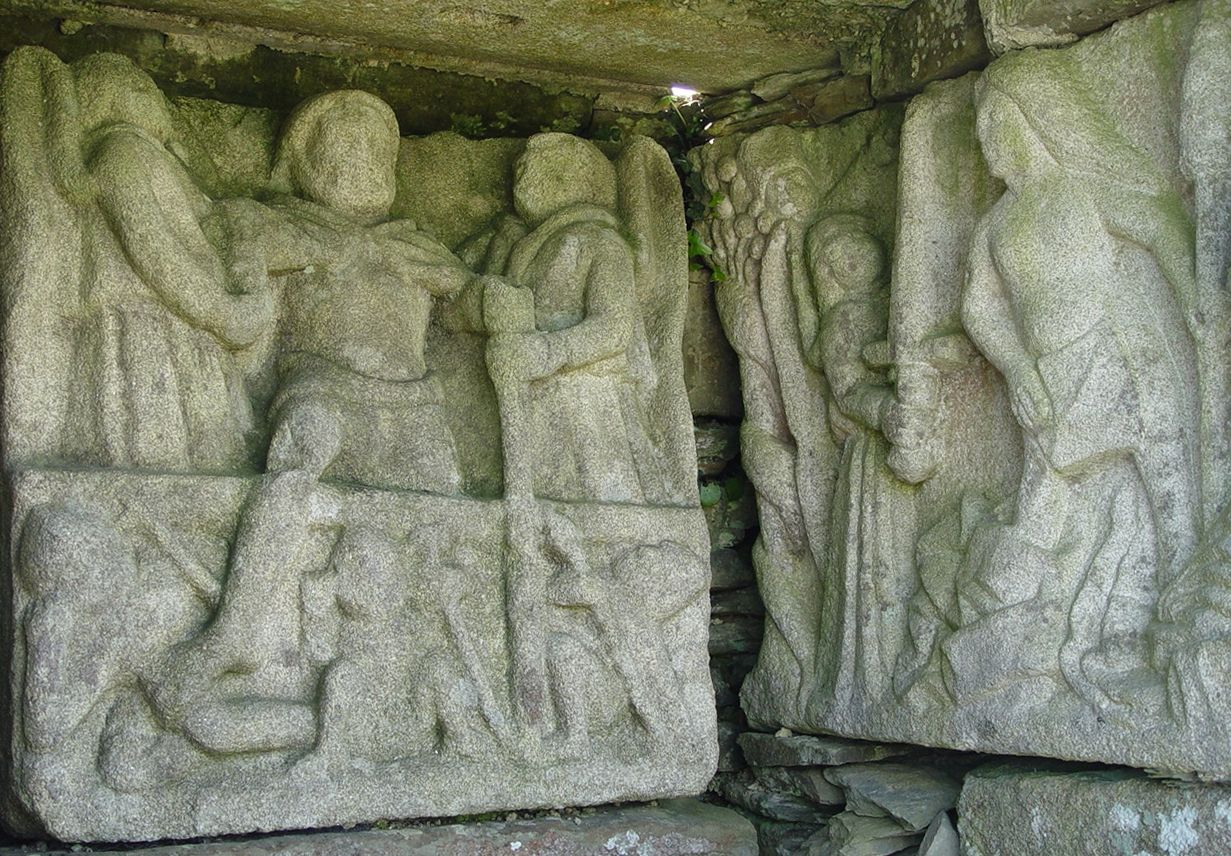
The resurrection scene and to the right the scene depicting the expulsion from Paradise. These are also in the niche. In the resurrection scene two angels help Jesus step from the tomb past the sleeping soldiers. The expulsion from Paradise depicts Adam and Eve being chased from paradise by an angel brandishing a sword and we also see the serpent wound around a tree.

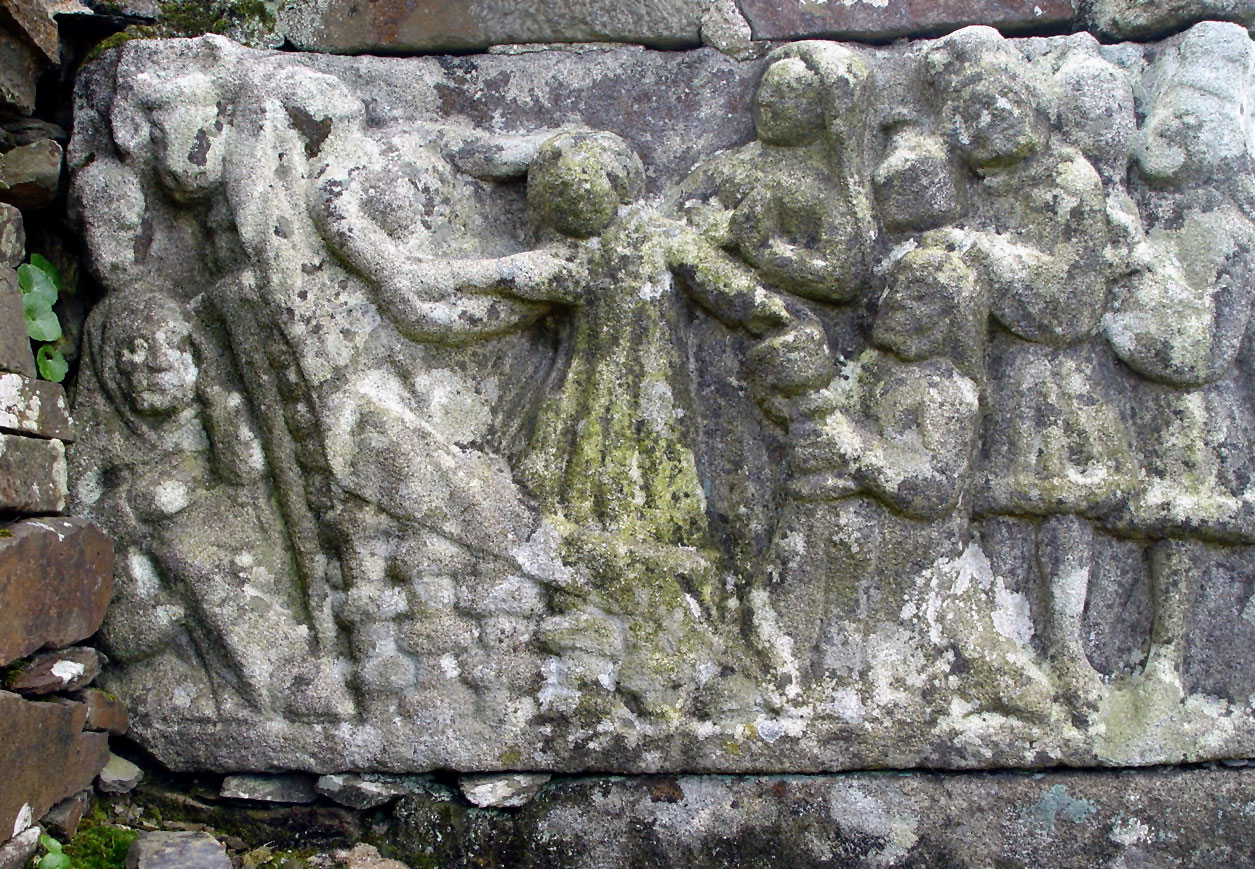
The nativity scene. Joseph is depicted far left. He is kneeling and above him are the heads of the cow and the ass peering from the stable. We then see the Virgin Mary laying in her bed. Jesus is depicted not as a baby but an infant and the sculptor combines the nativity scene with the Adoration of the Magi, so we next see the three kings presenting their gifts. Balthazar and Gaspard are standing but Melchior is kneeling and hands Jesus a chalice. The other two figures with the kings are the shepherds. This bas-relief appears to the left of the niche.

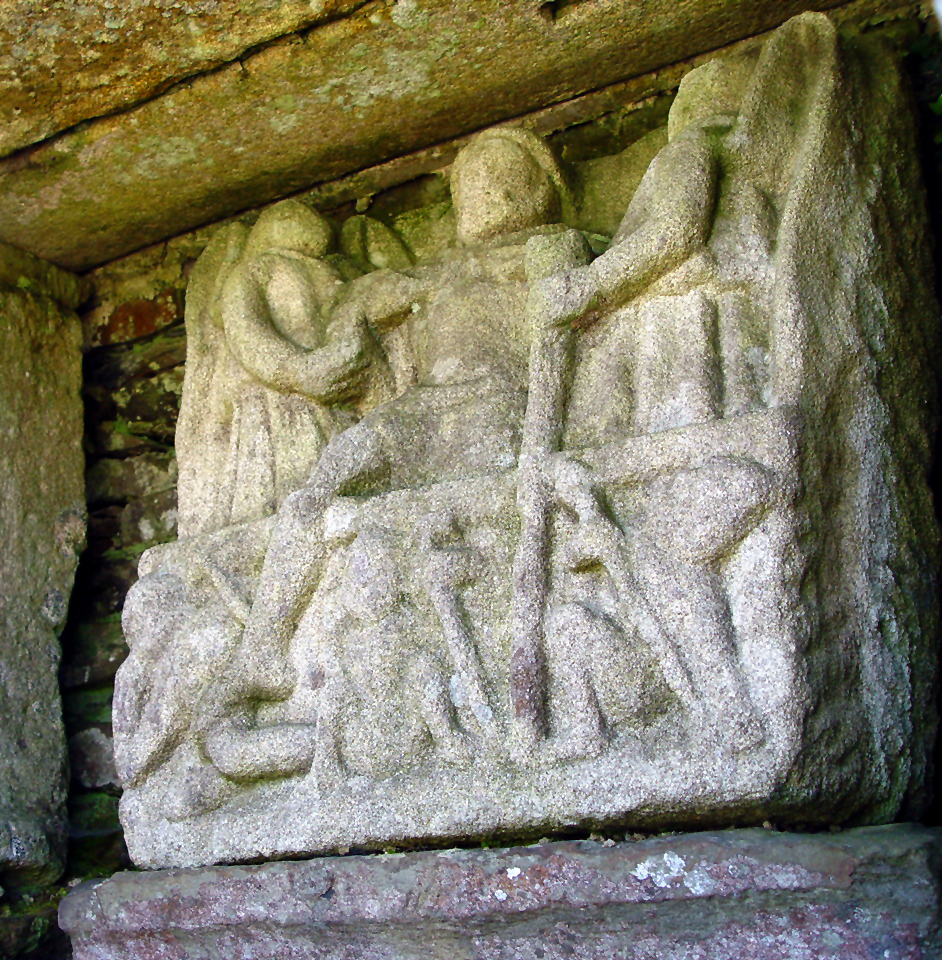
In the resurrection scene Jesus is helped leave the tomb by two angels. The bas-relief in the central niche of the calvary

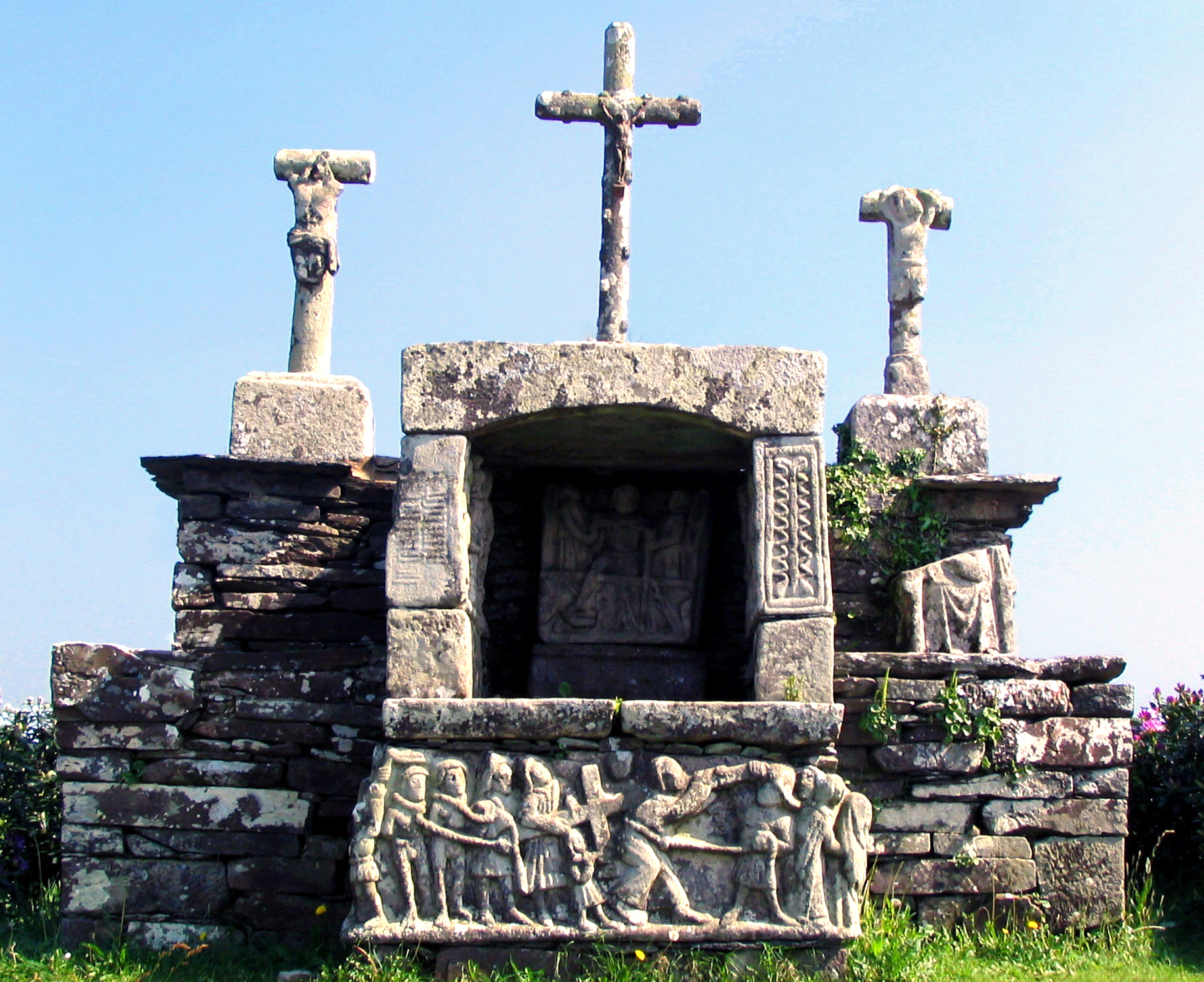
The Calvaire de Kerbreudeur. As can be seen the calvary is constructed in such a way as to create a niche in the centre and within this niche is a depiction of the resurrection and other scenes

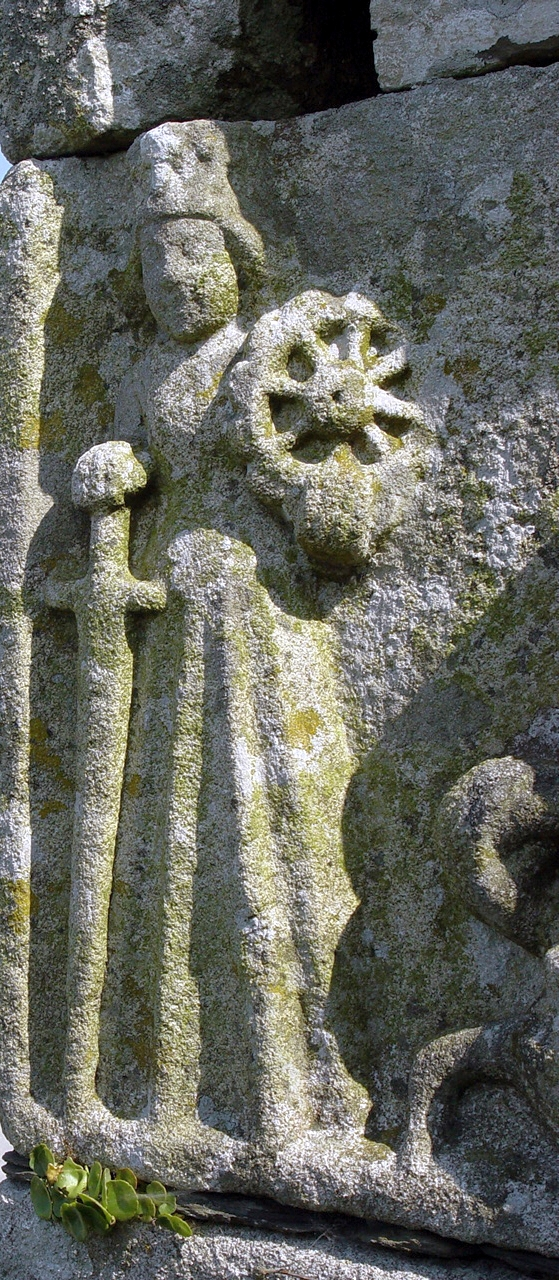
Catherine of Alexandria with her wheel depicted in the final panel in the central niche. In the same panel is a depiction of Saint Michael fighting the dragon.

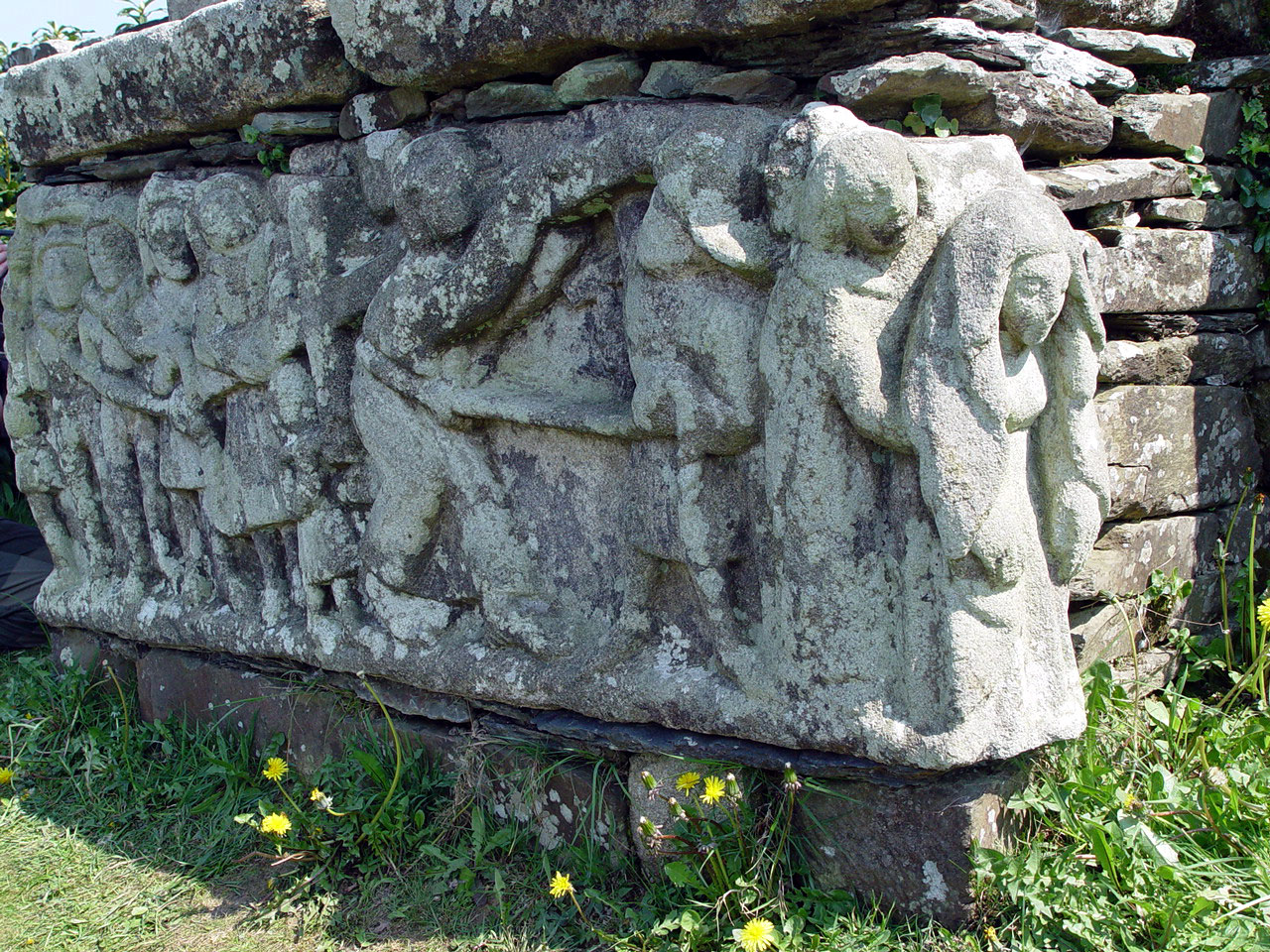
Jesus carrying the cross to Golgotha

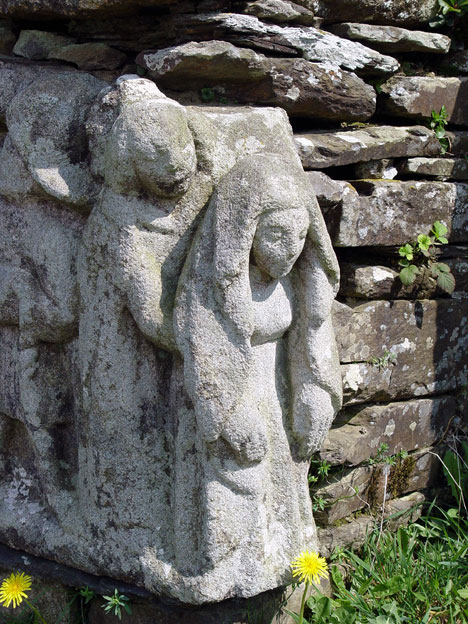
John the Evangelist comforts the Virgin Mary at the head of the procession depicting Jesus carrying the cross.

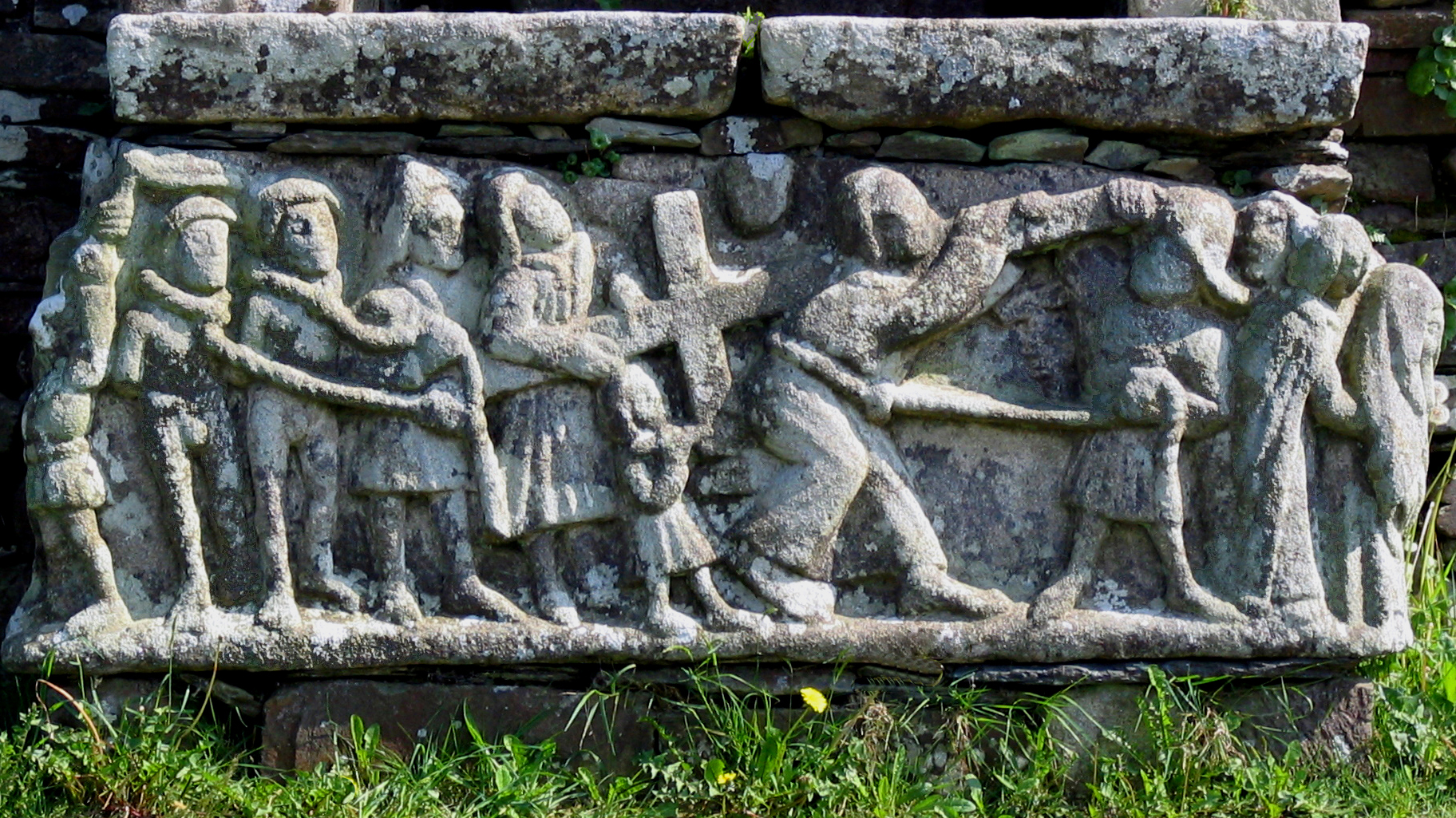
The procession depicting Jesus carrying the cross. On the left we see the good and bad robbers roped together around the neck, the end of the rope being held by a soldier who wears a chapeau à bec, a form of headgear popular in the reign of Louis XI of France. The next carving depicts another soldier who leans on the cross to make it heavier but Simon of Cyrene, shown as a very small figure, is under the cross and tries to lift it to counter the soldier's action. Jesus Christ comes next, also with a rope around his neck and led by another soldier. He carries a hammer which will be used to nail Christ to the cross. Another soldier comes next and finally we see John the Evangelist trying to comfort the Virgin Mary as they both lead the procession towards Golgotha

== Calvaries and crosses (continued) ==
Type of sculpture	Location	Description|Notes
Pietà	Gourin	What is left of a granite calvary, known as the "Croix de Pennanvern", comprising a crucifix and a pietà, is attributed to the atelier. On the side of the cross bearing Jesus are the Virgin Mary and John the Evangelist and an angel over Jesus' head tending to his hair. In the pietà only Jesus' chest and the lower part of the body is left. Also at Gourin is the "Croix de Menguionnet", this also by the atelier. Here only the crucifix has survived but the right arm has been repaired using cement. Many people from Gourin emigrated to the United States of America and Canada, a fact marked by the copy of the Statue of Liberty in Gourin's main square. The Morbihan commune also played a role in the Révolte des Bonnets Rouges.
Calvary known as the "Calvaire du Bėron"	Châteauneuf-du-Faou	On the side of the calvary facing west the atelier carved an angel, the Virgin Mary, the crucifixion, and John the Evangelist and on the reverse side a pietà with two angels. Both angels comfort Mary by tenderly lifting the edges of her veil from her face. The calvary is 4 metres high and carved from granite. Angels lovingly lift the edges of the Virgin Mary's veil from her face in the pietà on the Calvary known as the "Calvaire du Beron"
Calvary known as the "Calvaire de la chapelle du Moustoir".	Châteauneuf-du-Faou	By the Moustoir chapel or as it is also known, the chapel Saint-Ruelin, is a 5 metre high granite calvary attributed to the atelier. It features the good and bad robbers, an angel lifting a lock of Jesus' hair, the Virgin Mary and John the Evangelist as well aa a pietà which, as with the calvary at Bėron, has two angels lifting the edges of her veil from the Virgin Mary's face in a gesture of sympathy and love. A depiction of a devil is added beneath the depiction of the bad robber. The Calvaire de la chapelle du Moustoir
Roadside calvary	Le Moustoir	By the road leading from the Sainte-Barbe chapel is another work attributed to the atelier. The cross has been placed on a granite pedestal sculpted by the Maitre de Moustoir in the 16th century and a 20th-century cross. The calvary has suffered over the years from exposure to traffic and the heads of the Virgin Mary, John the Evangelist and one of the angels have disappeared as well as part of Jesus' body and his head but the angel placed at Jesus' feet with a chalice has survived. On the reverse side two winged angels are included in the pietà. The one on the left side touches Jesus' hair whilst that on the right side holds his left calf.

== Pietà ==
Type of sculpture	Location	Description|Notes
Pietà	Saint-Hernin	There is a pietà attributed to the atelier set in the wall of the Chapelle Sainte-Anne which used to be the church ossuary. The pietà features "anges de douceur".
Pietà	Carhaix-Plouguer	There is a granite pietà in the Église Saint-Trémeur's north transept. At Mary's side are two winged angels. One holds Jesus' calf and the other caresses his head with one hand and holds his right hand with the other. The pietà at Carhaix
Pietà	Kergloff	Inside the Église Saint-Trėmeur by the altar to the north of the nave is a limestone pietà. The dead body of Christ lays across Mary's lap and there are two angels on either side of her. One angel puts her hand under Jesus' head to support it. Under Jesus' feet an inscription reads "J.SALOMON".
Pietà	Laz, Finistère	Another pietà featuring "anges de douceur". This much worn work attributed to the atelier in located by the entry to the presbytery garden. One angel supports Jesus' head with one hand and lifts Mary's veil with the other. The second holds Jesus' knee. This pietà is thought to have come from a calvary. The pietà at Laz
Pietà	Plusquellec	There is a granite Pietà in the Église Notre-Dame de Grâces. The Virgin Mary is surrounded by four angels, two at the top and two at the bottom. The two angels at the top are lifting the edges of Mary's veil.

== Miscellaneous ==
Type of sculpture	Location	Description|Notes
Plaques	Peumerit-Quintin	Two plaques thought to have been part of an altarpiece were rescued from the old chapel at Loc'h and in 1968 they were mounted in the choir area of the Église Sainte-Anne. The two plaques depict six episodes from the Passion of Christ. On one plaque is a depiction of the Flagellation and the carrying of the cross (Christ Carrying the Cross) and on the second the crucifixion, a pietà and the resurrection and Descent into hell. Both plaques are carved from granite and have been attributed to the atelier. One trademark of the atelier is the tendency to make the feet large; see the feet of Christ and the good and bad robbers in the Peumerit-Quintin plaques.
