= Châteauneuf-du-Faou =

Châteauneuf-du-Faou Kastell-Nevez-ar-Faou
- Commune
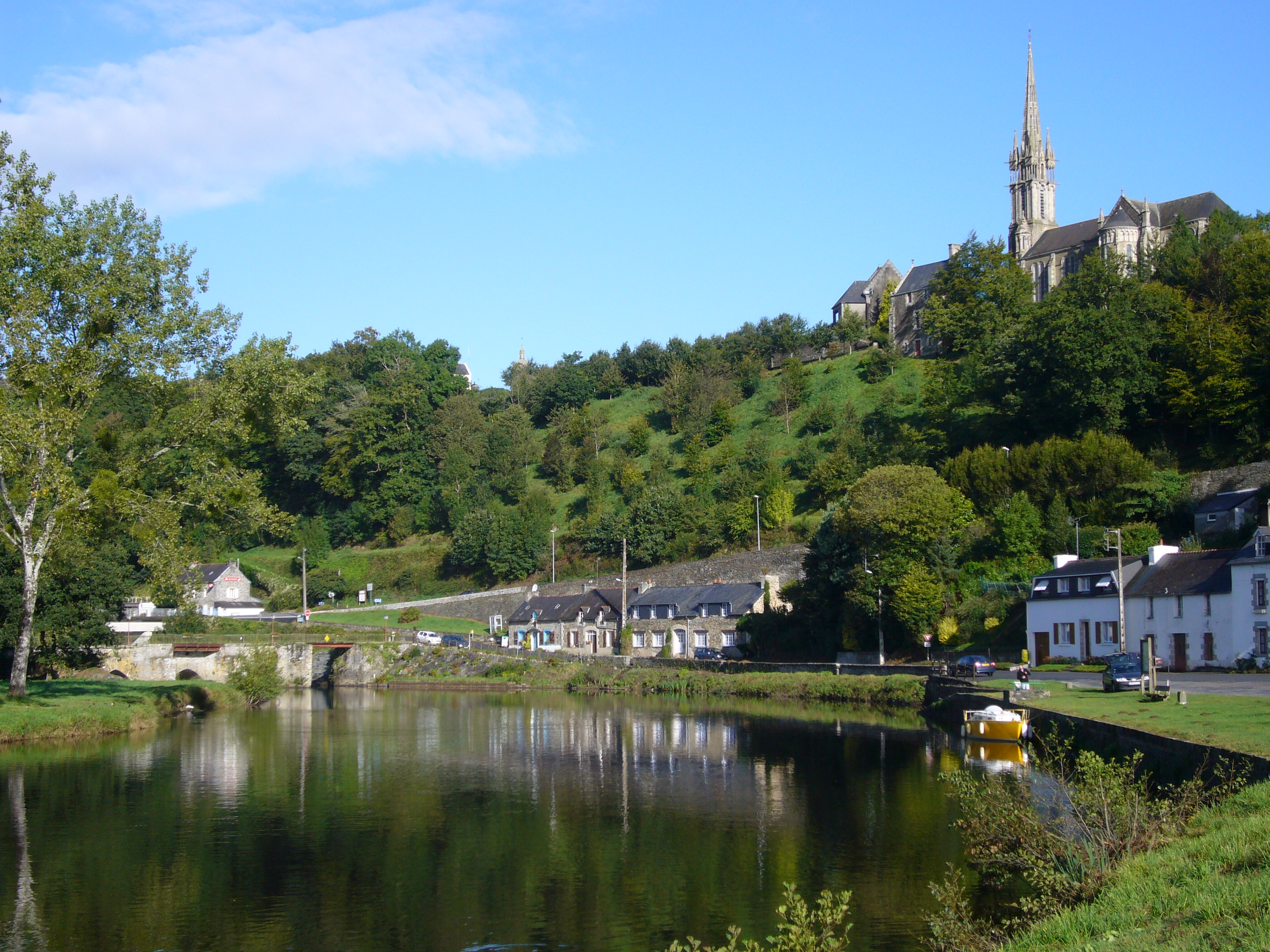
- Châteauneuf-du-Faou on the Aulne and Canal de Nantes à Brest

- Flag Coat of arms
- Location of Châteauneuf-du-Faou
- Location within France Location within Brittany
- Coordinates: 48°11′15″N 3°48′47″W
- Country: France
- Region: Brittany
- Department: Finistère
- Arrondissement: Châteaulin
- Canton: Briec
- Intercommunality: Haute Cornouaille

Government
  - Mayor (2020–2026): Tugdual Braban
- Area^{1}: 42.58 km^{2} (16.44 sq mi)
- Highest elevation: 153 m (502 ft)
- Lowest elevation: 31 m (102 ft)
- Population (2023): 3,651
  - Density: 85.74/km^{2} (222.1/sq mi)
- Time zone: UTC+01:00 (CET)
  - Summer (DST): UTC+02:00 (CEST)
- INSEE/Postal code: 29027 /29520
- ^{1} French Land Register data, which excludes lakes, ponds, glaciers > 1 km^{2} (0.386 sq mi or 247 acres) and river estuaries.

Châteauneuf-du-Faou (Breton: Kastell-Nevez-ar-Faou, before 1958: Châteauneuf) is a commune in the Finistère department of Brittany in north-western France.

The commune is listed as a Village étape.

== Geography ==
Châteauneuf-du-Faou is located in the middle of Brittany, between Monts d'Arrée and Montagne Noire. The town is built on a hill overlooking the Canal de Nantes à Brest, which is the canalized river Aulne. The bridge over this waterway was built in 1638, when Louis XIII was king of France, and is known as the "Old King's Bridge".

== Map ==
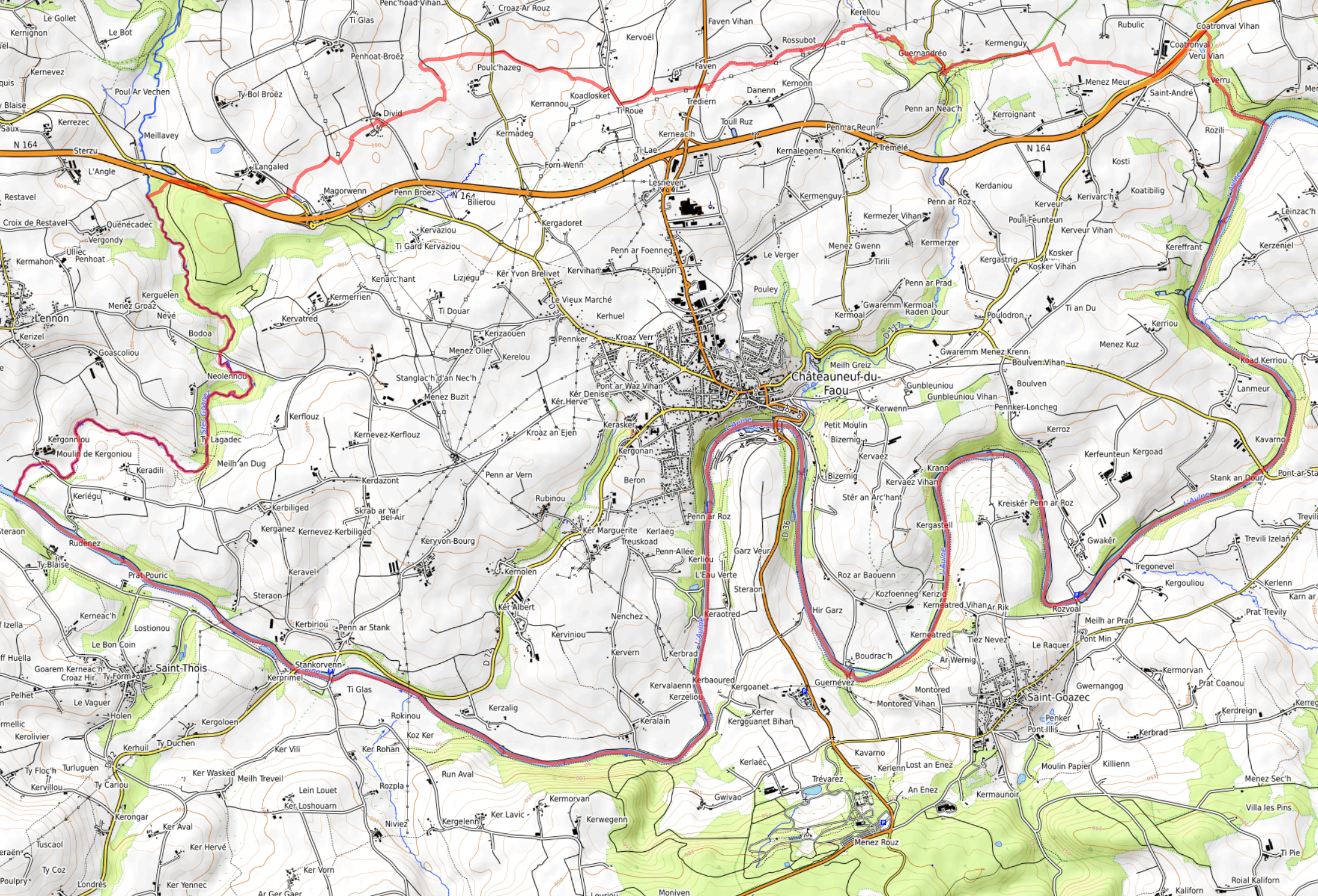
Topographic map

== Population ==
Historical population

Year	Pop.	±% p.a.
1793	2,140	—
1800	2,197	+0.38%
1806	2,183	−0.11%
1821	2,128	−0.17%
1831	2,506	+1.65%
1836	2,594	+0.69%
1841	2,536	−0.45%
1846	2,700	+1.26%
1851	2,815	+0.84%
1856	2,781	−0.24%
1861	2,830	+0.35%
1866	3,008	+1.23%
1872	2,998	−0.06%
1876	3,201	+1.65%
1881	3,328	+0.78%
1886	3,537	+1.23%
1891	3,566	+0.16%
1896	3,661	+0.53%
1901	3,915	+1.35%

Year	Pop.	±% p.a.
1906	4,016	+0.51%
1911	4,285	+1.31%
1921	3,929	−0.86%
1926	3,988	+0.30%
1931	3,956	−0.16%
1936	3,854	−0.52%
1946	3,695	−0.42%
1954	3,337	−1.27%
1962	3,436	+0.37%
1968	3,723	+1.35%
1975	3,754	+0.12%
1982	3,972	+0.81%
1990	3,777	−0.63%
1999	3,595	−0.55%
2007	3,636	+0.14%
2012	3,692	+0.31%
2017	3,673	−0.10%
2023	3,651	−0.10%

Source: EHESS and INSEE (1968-2023)

== International relations ==
Châteauneuf-du-Faou is twinned with the English town of South Brent, and the Spanish town Chinchón.

== Name ==
The inhabitants of Châteauneuf-du-Faou are known in French as Châteauneuviens.

== The Breton language ==
On 6 November 2006 the municipality launched a linguistic plan through Ya d'ar brezhoneg. In 2008, 10.4% of primary-school children in the area attended bilingual schools.

== History ==
There is strong evidence that people have lived in this area for thousands of years. A large number of tumuli discovered near the sides of the road from Châteaulin to Carhaix testify to the density of the prehistoric population. Burial sites from the Bronze and Iron Ages have also been found.

Roman coins from the reigns of the emperors Gallienus and Aurelian were discovered in 1878.

During its history Châteauneuf-du-Faou was given different names in Latin and French:

- "Castellum novum" in the 12th century
- "Castrum novum" in 1217
- "Castrum novum in fago" between 1330 and 1368
- Châteauneuf-du-Faou in 1391. This is Châteauneuf-du-Faou or "Kastell-Nevez-ar-Faou" in the Breton language It translates to "the New Castle in the Country."

Castrum Novum, a new fortress, was built by the lords of Faou. They belonged to a branch of the house of Léon. The fortress was seized in 1186 by Guihomarch and Hervé de Léon, and subsequently belonged to the Viscounts of Léon until it was confiscated by John VI, Duke of Brittany, in 1420. The castle was slighted in 1440.

The town has experienced some riots and wars during its history. The worst day in its history was on 23 March 1593. The War of Religion which started in 1589 was about to end. Only four months were remaining before Henry IV of France's conversion to Catholicism with his famous Paris vaut bien une messe ("Paris is well worth a Mass"). On that spring day, in March 1593, Châteauneuf-du-Faou was invaded by hundreds of armed Huguenots. Houses were burnt and the inhabitants were murdered. The story is told that a Huguenot soldier seized a holy ciborium and threw it onto the ground. The priest picked it up and swallowed the Hosts, only to be killed by the soldier. This story is depicted on one of the stained glass windows of the chapel of Notre-Dame-des-Portes.

The Revolt of the papier timbré (or, as it was called in Brittany, the Revolt of the Red Bonnets, did not spare Châteauneuf-du-Faou. Angry peasants burned the castle in 1675.

In 1438 a statue of the Blessed Virgin Mary was found inside an old tree. Looked on as miraculous, the find was celebrated by the building of the chapel of Notre-Dame-des-Portes, a very popular place for pilgrimage throughout Brittany.

== Transport ==
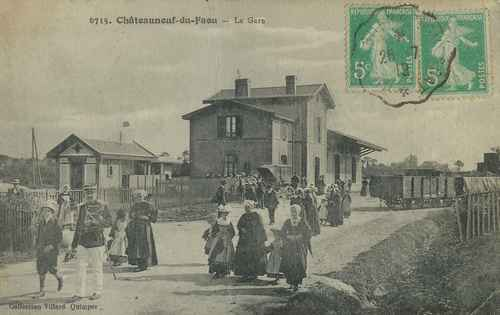
Châteauneuf-du-Faou station c.1905

Châteauneuf-du-Faou had a station on the Réseau Breton railway. The station was on the Carhaix - Camaret line, it opened on 30 October 1904 and closed on 9 April 1967.

== Art and culture ==
Notre-Dame-des-Portes is closely associated with the artist Paul Sérusier, after whom a road in the village is now named. He was a mystic artist and a founder of the group who called themselves Les Nabis, after the Hebrew word for prophets. He lived in Châteauneuf-du-Faou for several years. In 1894 he painted an inspiring picture, The Pardon of Notre-Dame-Des-Portes at Chateauneuf-Du-Faou This painting is now in the Musee des Beaux-Arts at Quimper. Sérusier was born in Paris, but the traditions and culture of Brittany made him say:

I feel more and more attracted by Brittany, my true fatherland, because I was born there in spirit.

The "Pardon" ceremony is an old tradition in Brittany. Randolph Caldecott visited Châteauneuf-du-Faou in 1874 and made sketches of a Pardon which took place in the rain.

The Pardon which is celebrated in Notre-Dame-des-Portes at the end of August is one of the most famous in Brittany.

== See also ==
- Communes of the Finistère department
- List of works of the two Folgoët ateliers
- Listing of the works of the atelier of the Maître de Tronoën
