= Calvary at Tronoën =

Calvary located in Finistère, France

Coordinates: 47.856066°N 4.328312°W

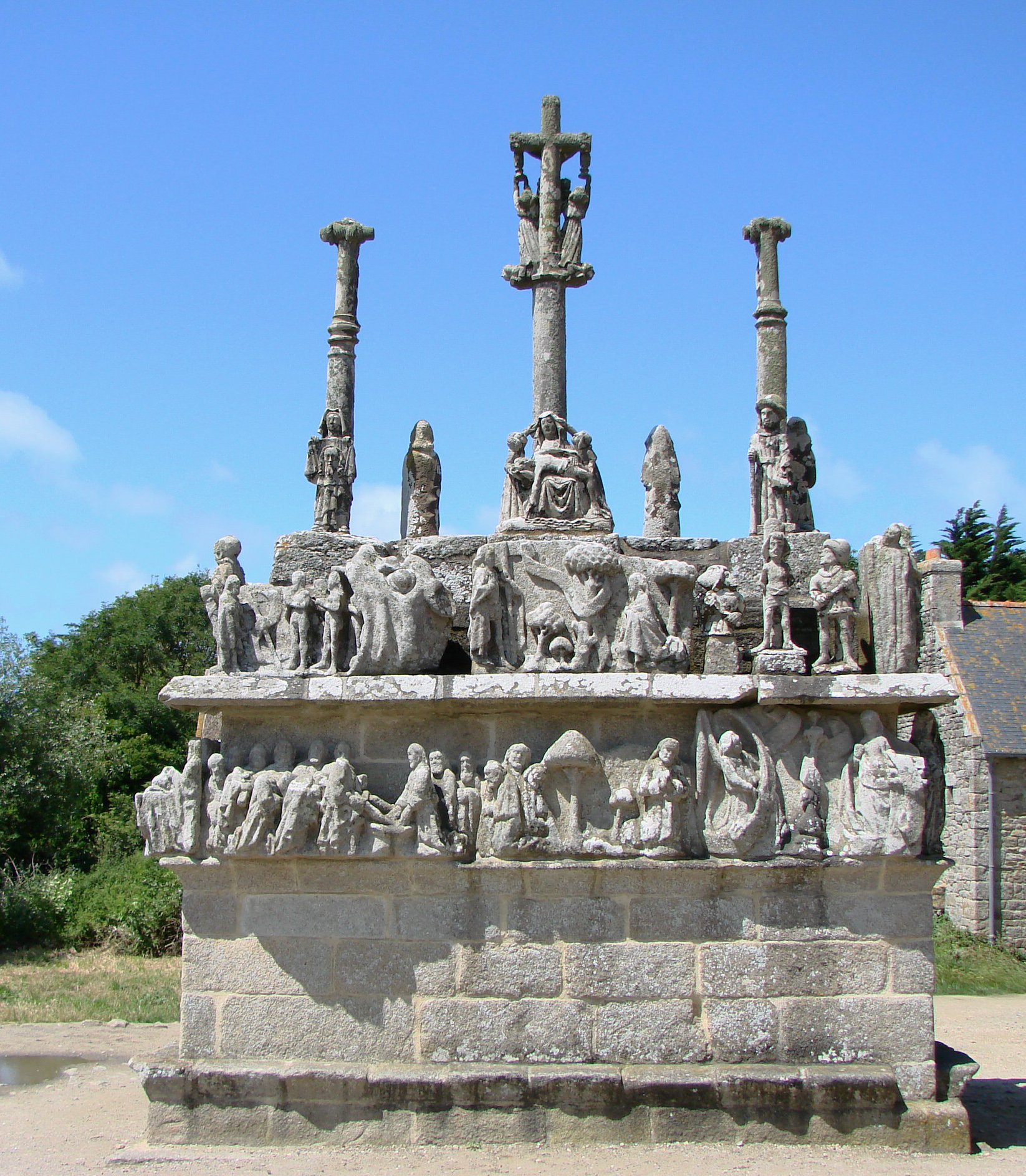
Below the central cross we see the pietà. St Veronica depicted holding up her veil is at the base of the smaller cross on the left and at the base of the cross on the right is a depiction of James, son of Zebedee. Below the three crosses and on the upper frieze we have, from left to right, Jesus standing before the yawning mouth of hell and then the scene in the Garden of Gethsemane where Jesus appears to Mary Magdalene. Finally we see Jesus being mocked. On the lower frieze and from left to right we have Jesus washing Saint Peter's feet, Jesus praying in the Garden of Olives and finally Christ in Majesty

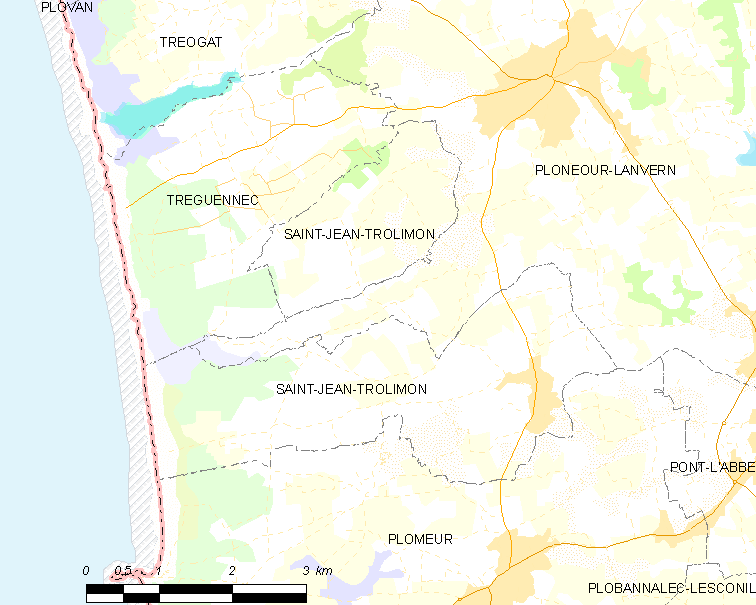
Map showing location of Saint-Jean-Trolimon

Calvary at Tronoën is a calvary located at Saint-Jean-Trolimon in the Quimper arrondissement. It is located in the "pays bigouden", a particularly wind swept area of Brittany; the nearby chapelle was called the "cathédrale des dunes". The calvary dates to between 1450 and 1460 and stands on the grass verge ("placitre") in front of Saint-Jean-Trolimon's Notre-Dame Chapel which dates to the 15th century. It replaced an ancient Romano-Gallic temple dedicated to the goddess Venus (mythology) and was thought to have been commissioned by the Pont barons.. It is the oldest of Finistère's six "grands calvaires" and is thought to be the work of several workshops operating in Scaër, mainly that of the "Maître de Tronoën".

== Differences between this calvary and others ==
Several differences emerge when this calvary is compared with the others in this region. Firstly there are two scenes devoted to Jesus' baptism. In the nativity scene, the statue of the baby Jesus shows him standing and aged about seven rather than as a new-born child. There are three crosses depicted, with those bearing the two robbers being a part of the composition. The calvary also depicts two angels collecting Jesus' blood. A "mise au tombeau", the scene showing Jesus being prepared for burial, a standard feature of other such calvaries, is not included and neither is the "Flight into Egypt", nor Jesus' entry into Jerusalem and his arrest. Conversely the subjects of the Last judgement and Garden of Eden are covered.

== Description of the calvary ==
The calvary has suffered much erosion over the years, not surprisingly in view of its proximity to the sea and the sea's winds. This erosion does make some of the parts of the statuary difficult to interpret although it was restored in 2001. The calvary comprises a large rectangular granite pedestal or base which measures 4.50 m by 3.15 m. Around this base are two friezes on which are various sculptures, single or in groups, which recount some incidents in Jesus' life beginning with the Annunciation when the Archangel Gabriel tells the Virgin Mary that she is pregnant with Jesus Christ. The bulk of these statues are in granite except for the Visitation, the Nativity and the Adoration of the Magi where the local Kersanton stone was used. Kersanton is easier to carve and very resistant to erosion. Research suggests that several masons and workshops were responsible for these sculptures. There is clear evidence that the calvary was originally painted. Another oddity is that many of the sculptures are carved in blocks and some have suggested that they were originally carved for display as part of a church wall rather than for a calvary. Also, there is evidence that there had originally been some form of altar table on the eastern side of the calvary.

== The three crosses ==
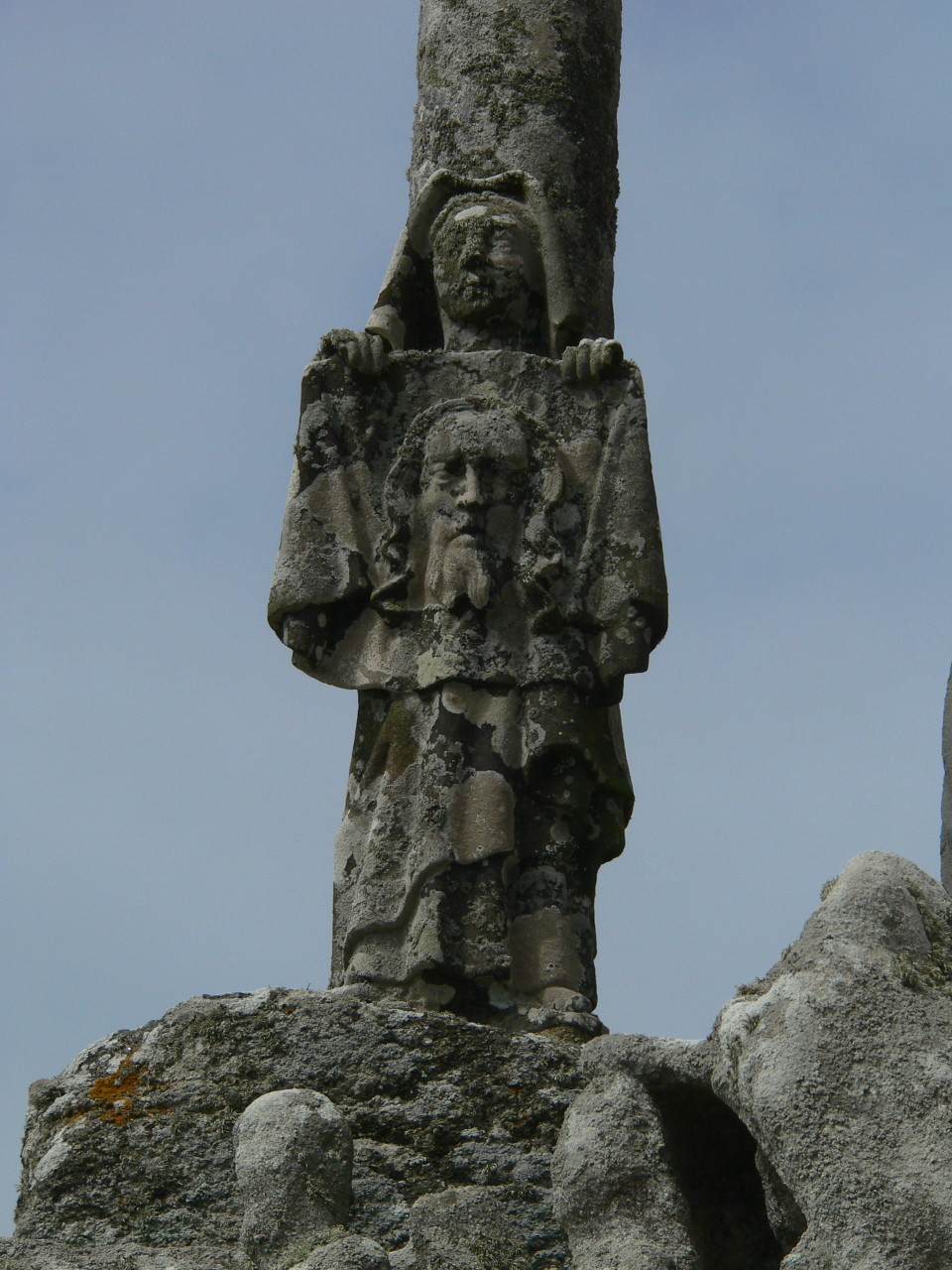
Saint Veronica holds out her veil bearing Christ's image

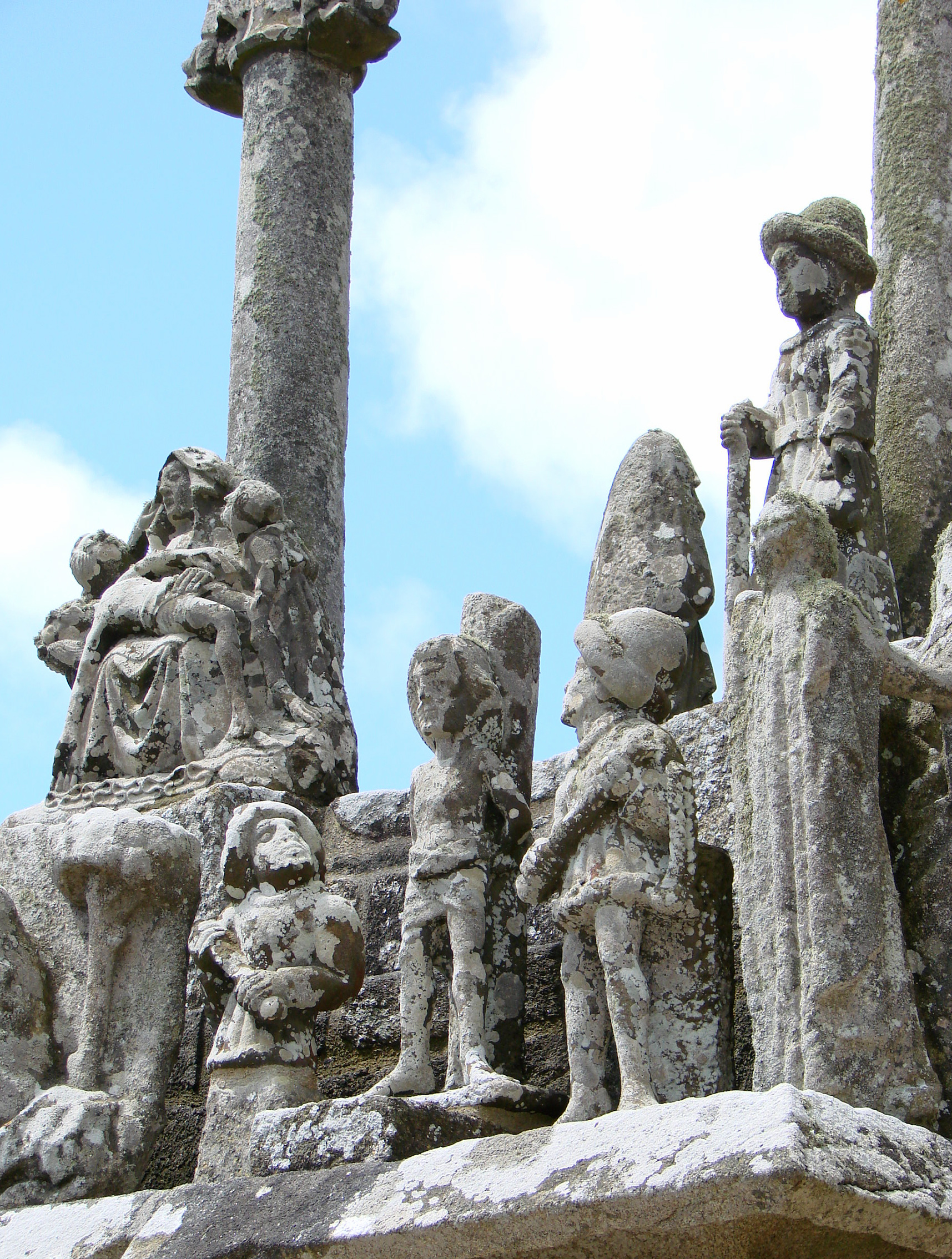
St James at the base of the third cross. On his chest he wears a "shell of Compostella" and the typical hat of a pilgrim. Below Jesus can be seen being mocked and teased by two Roman soldiers.

There are three crosses involved at Tronoën, the central cross bearing Jesus Christ with the pietà at its base whilst the two smaller crosses carry the two robbers executed alongside Jesus. At the base of the cross on the right of Jesus' cross is a sculpture showing St Veronica holding up her veil bearing Jesus' image and on the left is a depiction of James, son of Zebedee, wearing the typical dress of a pilgrim to Santiago del Compostella, a pilgrim's staff and a sea-shell worn on his chest.

- In the pietà the sculptor has added two angels at either side of the Virgin Mary. They appear to be tenderly lifting her veil from her forehead with one hand whilst the other hands rest on Jesus' head and knee.
- Jesus is accompanied by five angels who are collecting his blood in chalices, whilst one is positioned above Jesus' head.

== The east face of the calvary ==
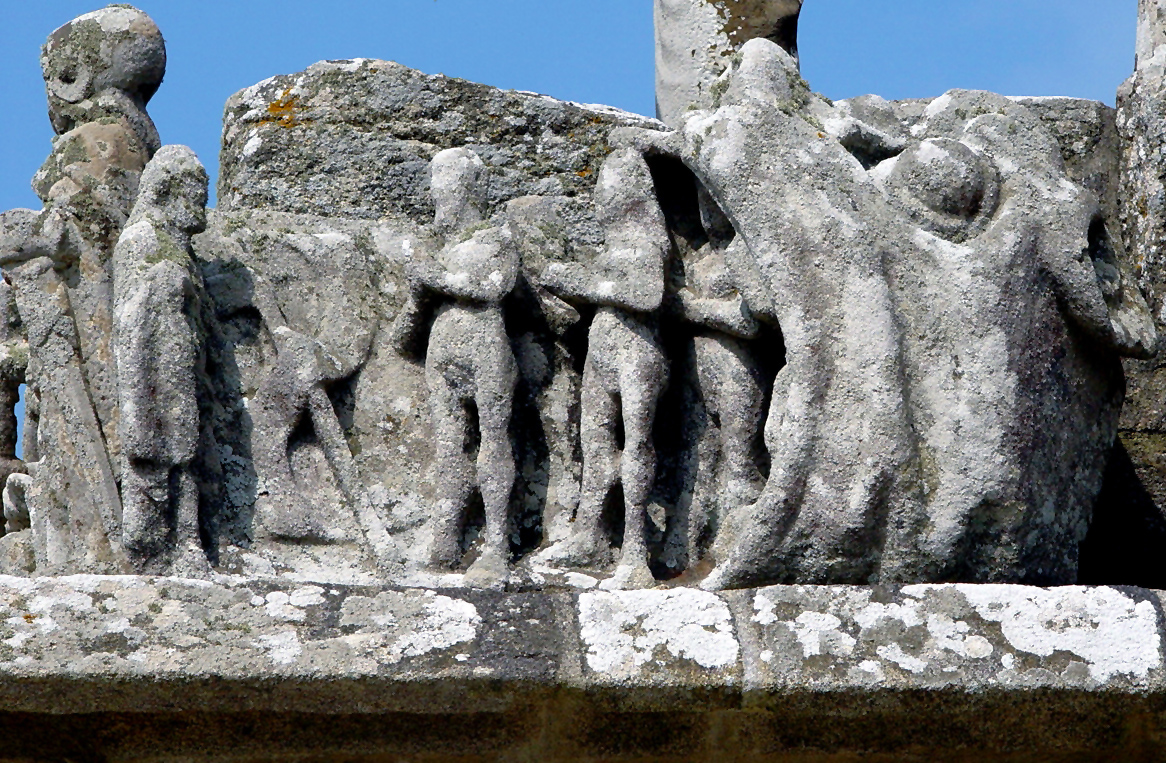
Jesus stands at the mouth of hell. Although erosion has effected this badly, one can make out the nose, eyes and ears of the monstrous head whose mouth is open and from which three figures are emerging

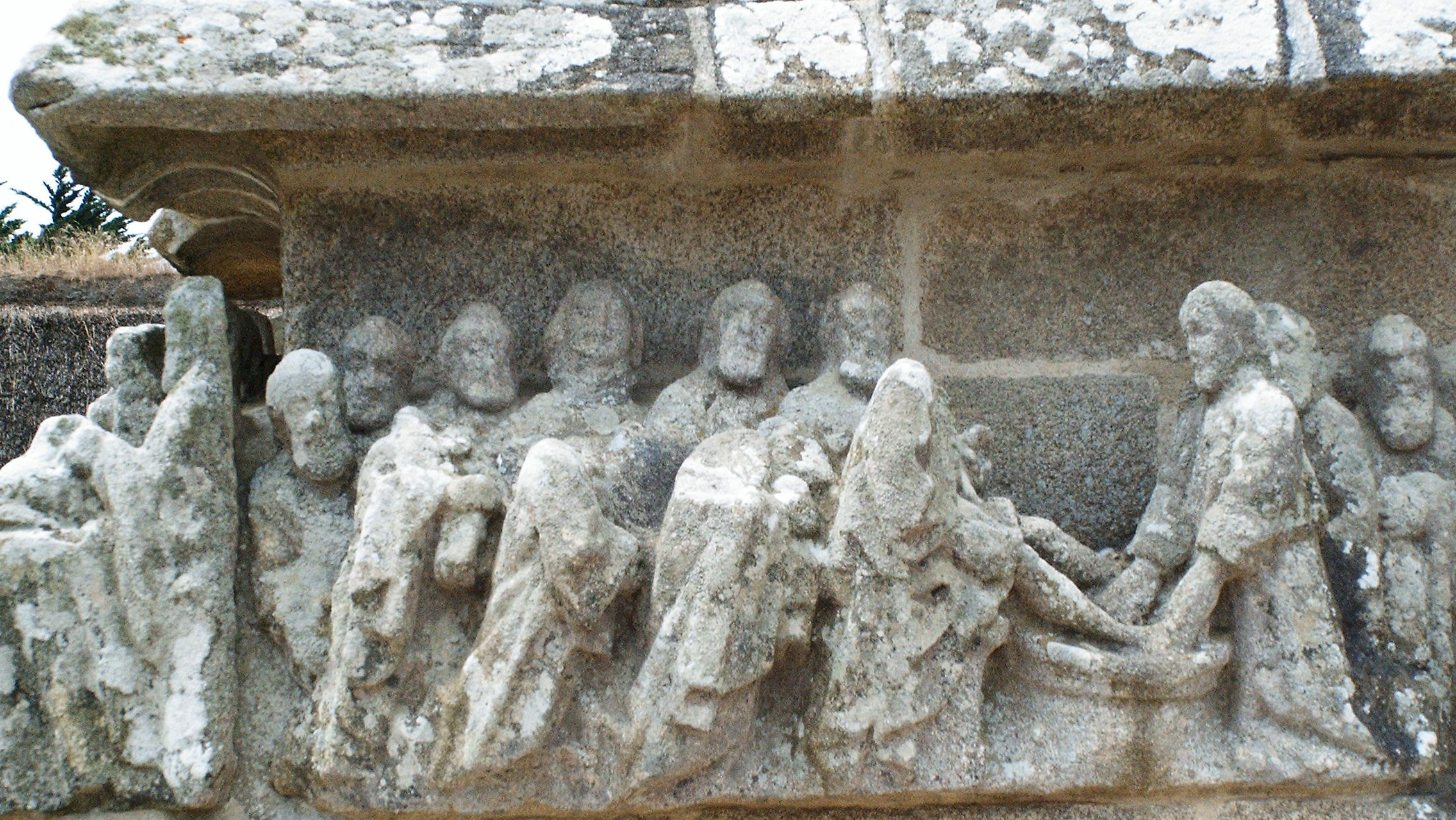
Jesus washing the disciple's feet

On the upper surface, the scenes cover the Descent into Hell, Jesus' appearance before Mary Magdalene and Jesus' flagellation whilst on the frieze below we have a scene showing Jesus washing his disciples' feet (Foot washing) followed by a depiction of Jesus in the garden of Gethsemane and the Annunciation in which the Virgin Mary kneels at a prie-Dieu and receives the greeting of an angel. A book lies in front of her and other books are laid out on the tables behind her.

- In the Descent into Hell scene, Jesus stands at the mouth of Hell Leviathan from which three figures are emerging.
- In the scene depicting Jesus' appearance before Mary Magdalene, three trees are added to show that the action takes place in a garden. Jesus holds a pilgrim's staff in his hand. A large Speech scroll is wrapped around the central tree.
- In the flagellation scene, Jesus is chained to a tree trunk and is being beaten by two soldiers.
- In the scene depicting the washing of the disciple's feet, Peter sits with his feet in a wash basin, Jesus kneels before him and the other disciples watch. They have formed two orderly lines. Some are kneeling some standing.
- In the scene in Gethsemane, Jesus is shown at prayer. Three of the disciples are with him, all kneeling.
- In the Annunciation scene the angel carries a banner on which is written "AVE.GRATIA.PLENA". The Virgin Mary's response on another banner reads "ECCE ANCILLA DOMINI" ("I am the servant of the Lord."). She kneels at a prie-Dieu.

== The south face of the calvary ==
The scenes on this face of the calvary are in granite and in high relief and deal with Original sin, the Resurrection and the Last Judgement.

- In the resurrection scene Jesus emerges from the tomb whilst two soldiers are shown sleeping and another two have fallen to the ground. A fifth soldier stands leaning on his lance.
- The scenes covering the "Last Judgement" and the area of "original sin" are complex compositions and the depiction of the Temptation of Christ shows the devil and a snake is shown wrapped around the tree of life. In a reference to the apocalypse, Jesus is shown on an arc in the sky surrounded by the Chosen people. The Virgin Mary prays at a misericord.
- In the scene depicting the Last Supper we see John the Evangelist, Jesus and just four of his apostles. On the table is the pascal lamb. It is thought that part of this last supper scene is missing, that which would have shown the other disciples at the table.

== The north face of the calvary ==
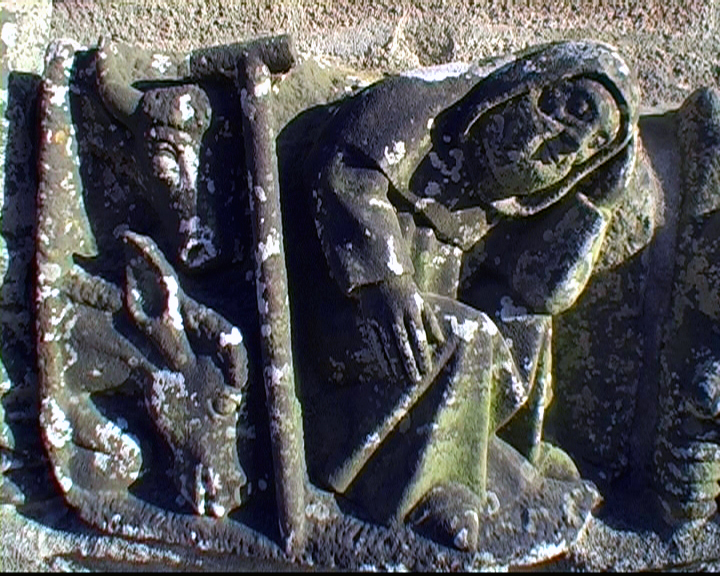
A detail from the nativity scene in the calvary at the Chapelle Notre-Dame-de-Tronoën. This scene appears on the north face. Joseph is sleeping in the stable. Two cattle are at his side

On the upper surface we have a depiction of the distressed Virgin Mary being supported by John the Evangelist and two female saints ("Pamoison de la Vierge"), Mary Magdalene and Mary Salome. In the next scene Jesus is being flogged by two soldiers who tighten the blindfold as they apply their whips. On the frieze below the first sculpture on the left is shown Elizabeth (biblical figure) visiting the Virgin Mary (the Visitation), the one pregnant with Jesus Christ and the other with John the Baptist, this being followed by three scenes relating to the nativity. Firstly we see Saint Joseph sleeping in the stable with two cattle next to him. Then we see the Virgin Mary laying in a bed and at the end of this bed is a depiction of a standing Jesus aged about 7 years, this followed by the Adoration of the Magi. The first wise man is kneeling before the bed whilst the second, dressed in the doublet worn in the reign of Charles VII, is pointing with his finger to the star which led them to the stable and addressing the third wise man who is smaller in stature.

- In the visitation scene Elizabeth tenderly lays the flat of her hand on Mary's stomach.
- In the nativity the Virgin Mary is shown bare-breasted. Jesus holds a globe of the world in his hand and is blessing the three wise men. Strangely Jesus appears as a young adolescent rather than a new-born baby.
- The three wise men wear the dress of aristocrats ("grands seigneurs"). Melchior is the wise man on the left and is kneeling before Jesus. The next wise man Balthazar stands in the middle. He turns his back on the nativity scene and faces the third wise man Gaspard.

== The west face of the calvary ==
On the upper surface we have the statue of a kneeling monk, a depiction of the Virgin Mary, and John the Evangelist. Below the scenes on this face of the calvary comprise blocks of granite carved in high-relief. The first positioned on the left depicts Pontius Pilate washing his hands as Jesus, held by two soldiers, is brought before him. Next we see the two thieves and Jesus, all three carrying their crosses. On the frieze below we see the Presentation of Jesus at the Temple with Jesus standing on a small stool and two depictions dealing with baptism. The first shows the baptism of Jesus by John the Baptist and the second Jesus baptizing the faithful as recounted in John 3, Verse 26. Finally Jesus is shown holding discussions with the elders in the temple.

- In the scene showing Jesus being tried by Pontius Pilate, the servant pouring the water for Pilate to wash his hands wears a béret or faluche.
- In the scene where Jesus is presented at the temple the Virgin Mary stands behind him and before them is a priest wearing a mitre. Joseph stands patiently behind the Virgin Mary and a servant is attending to the priest's needs.
- Between the two baptism scenes is a statue of an angel holding a robe.

== Gallery ==
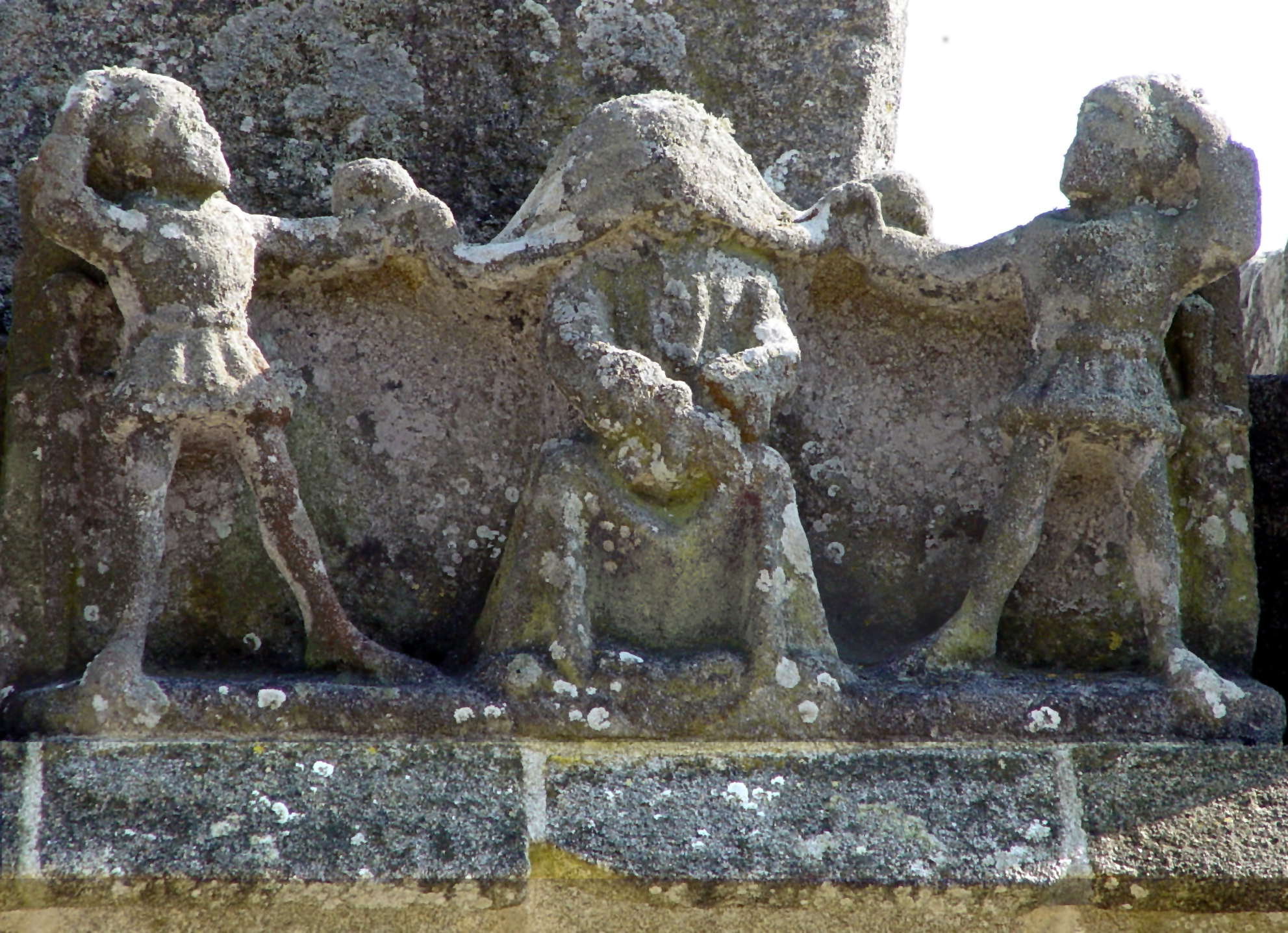
Jesus is blindfolded and mocked by two guards who hit him whilst asking "who hit you?". See Luke 22.63.

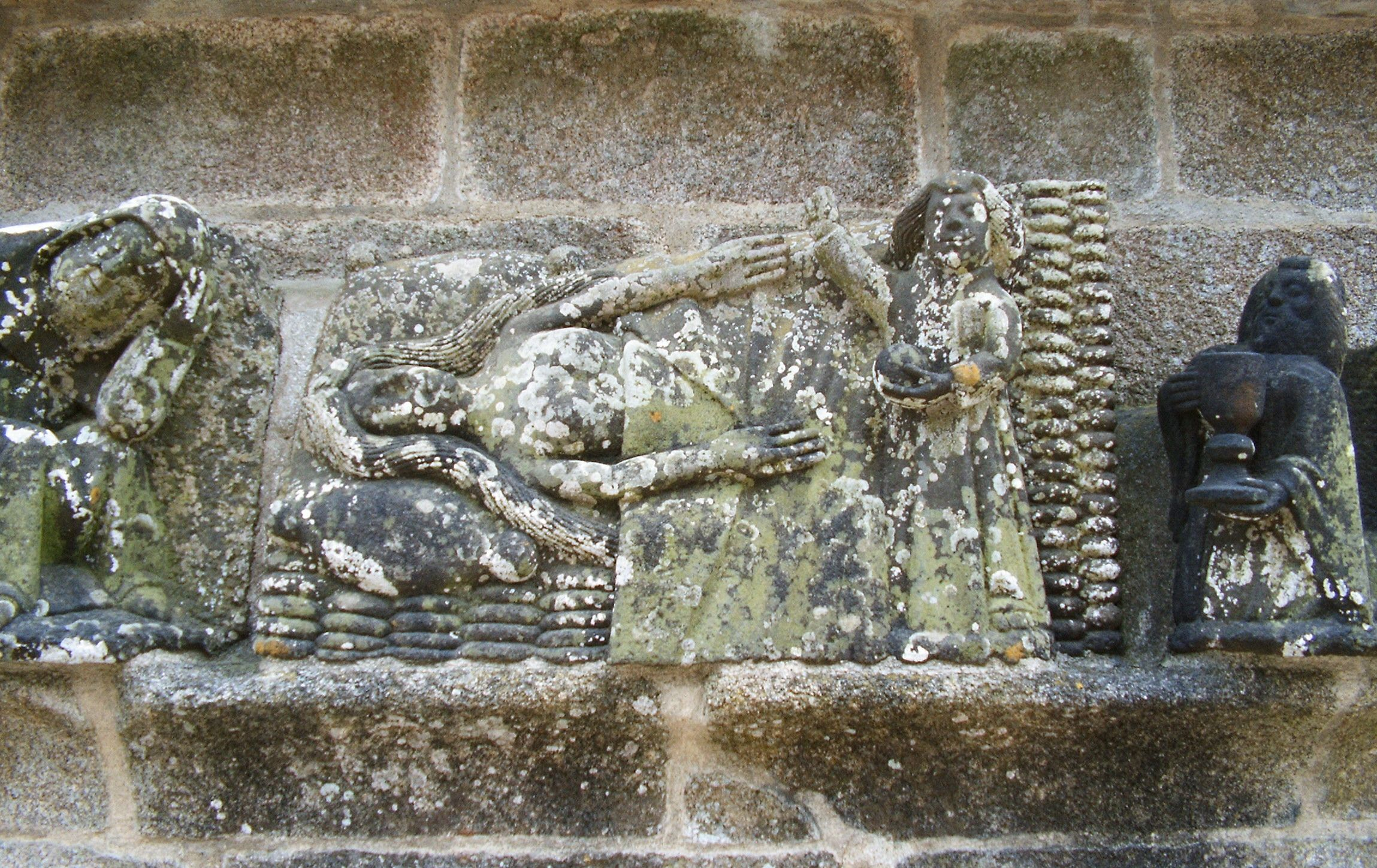
A bare-breasted Mary lies in a bed in the "nativity" scene. Joseph can be seen on the left. He is fast asleep. The new-born Jesus stands at the foot of the bed but he is depicted as a 7-year-old boy. He carries a globe of the world and gives a blessing. On the right of the bed we see one of the three wise men.

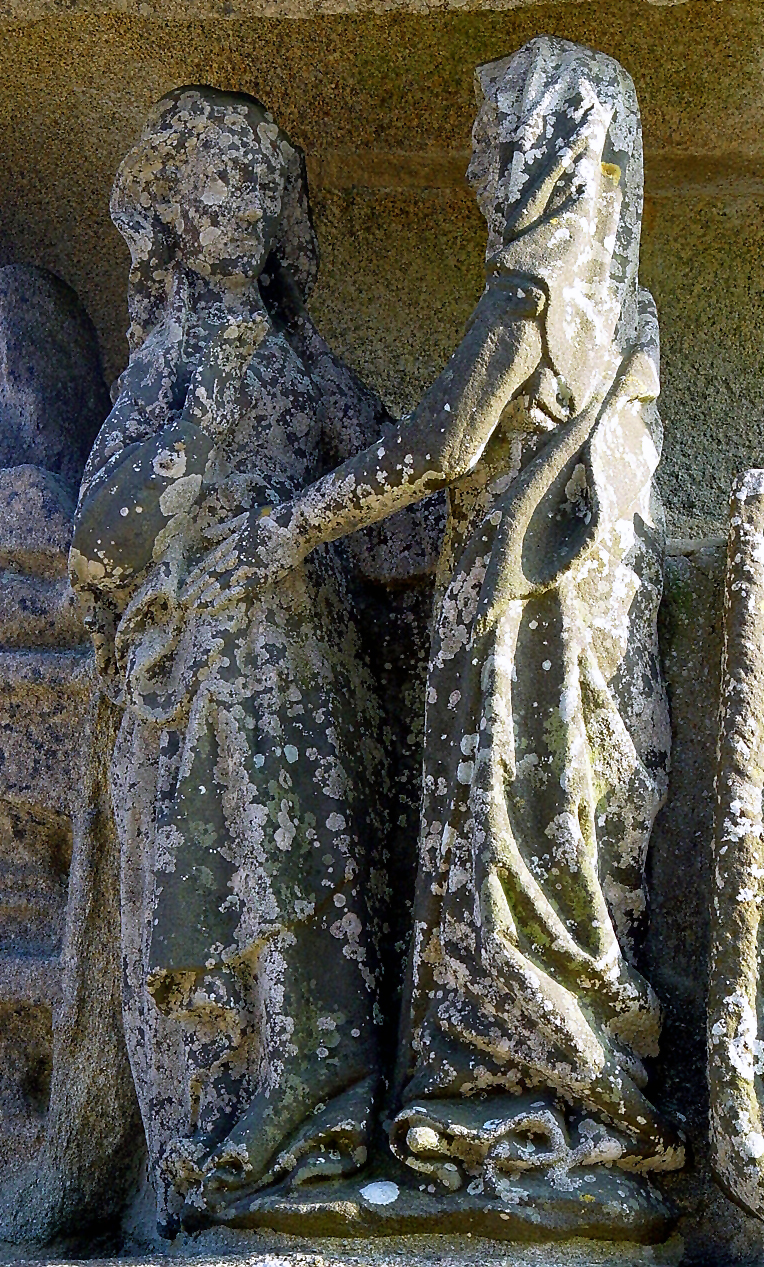
The visitation: Elizabeth, told by Mary of her pregnancy, touches Mary's stomach.

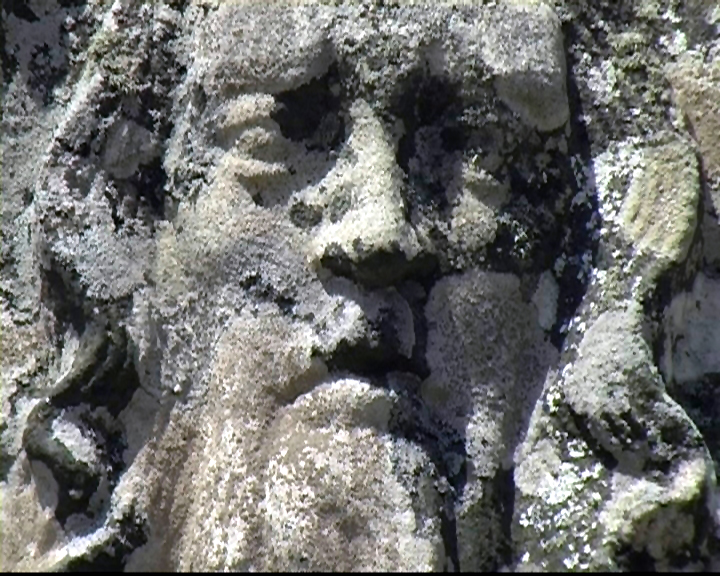
The image of Jesus on Veronica's veil

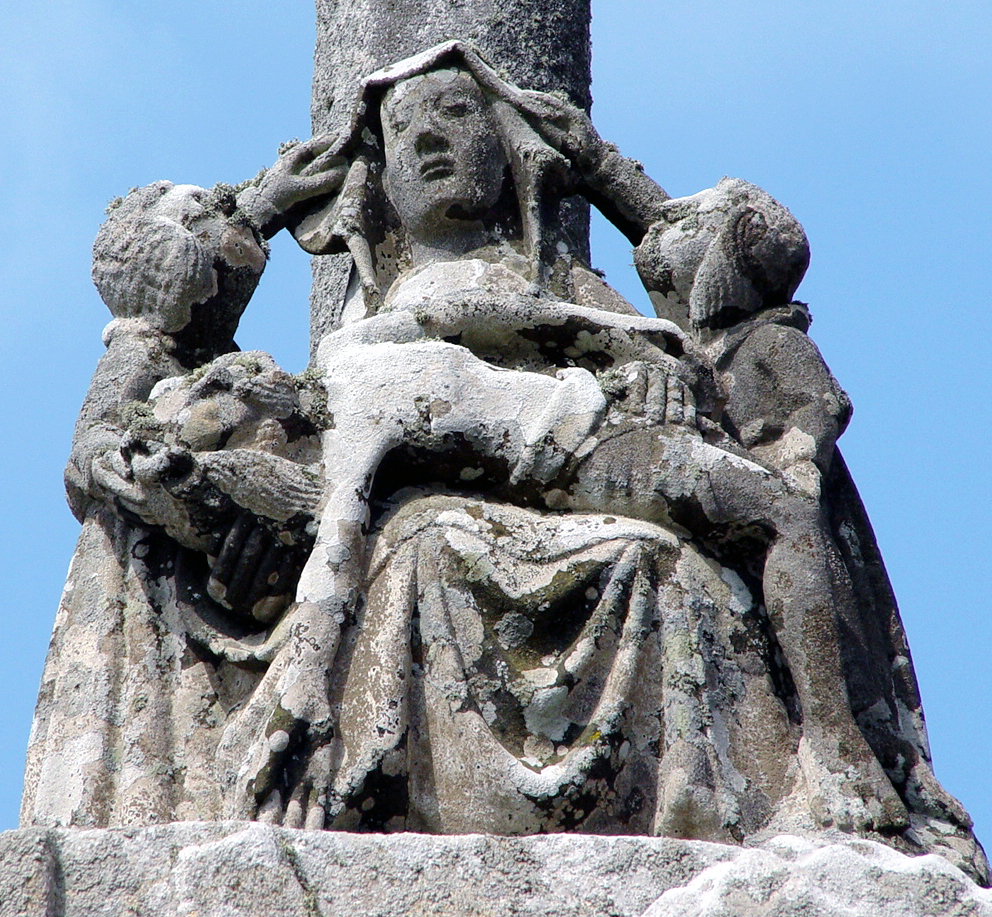
Detail from the calvary of the Chapelle Notre-Dame-de-Tronoën. The pietà on the base of the central cross. Note that the two angels are lifting Mary's veil. This was very much a trademark of the Maître de Tronoën's atelier, what art historians have called "la marque de douceur". Angels are shown lifting Mary's veil or touching Jesus' hair in a gesture of tenderness.

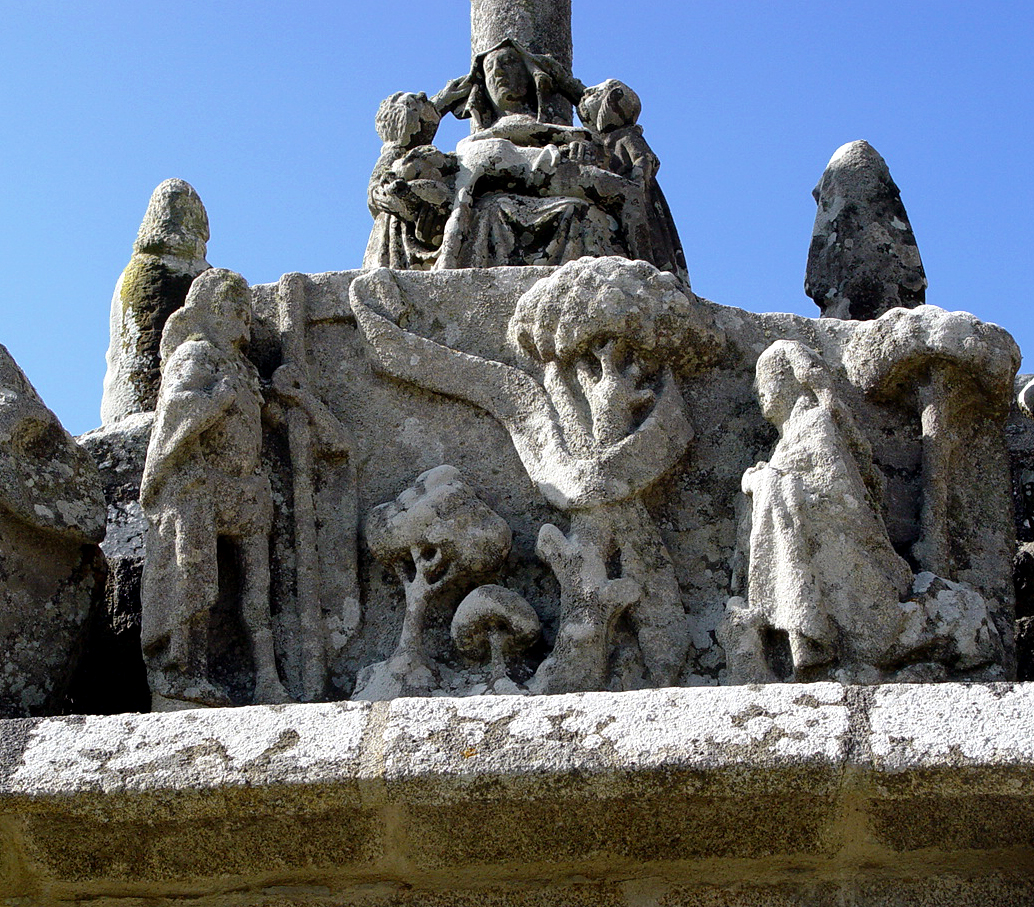
The apparition of the risen Christ appears before Mary Magdalene as recounted in John 20, Verses 11-18. The words "Ne me retiens pas!" "Noli me tangere" are written on a banner across the tree in the middle of the sculpture. These large banners were the forerunners of the modern "thought bubbles" ("bulles de bande dessinees").

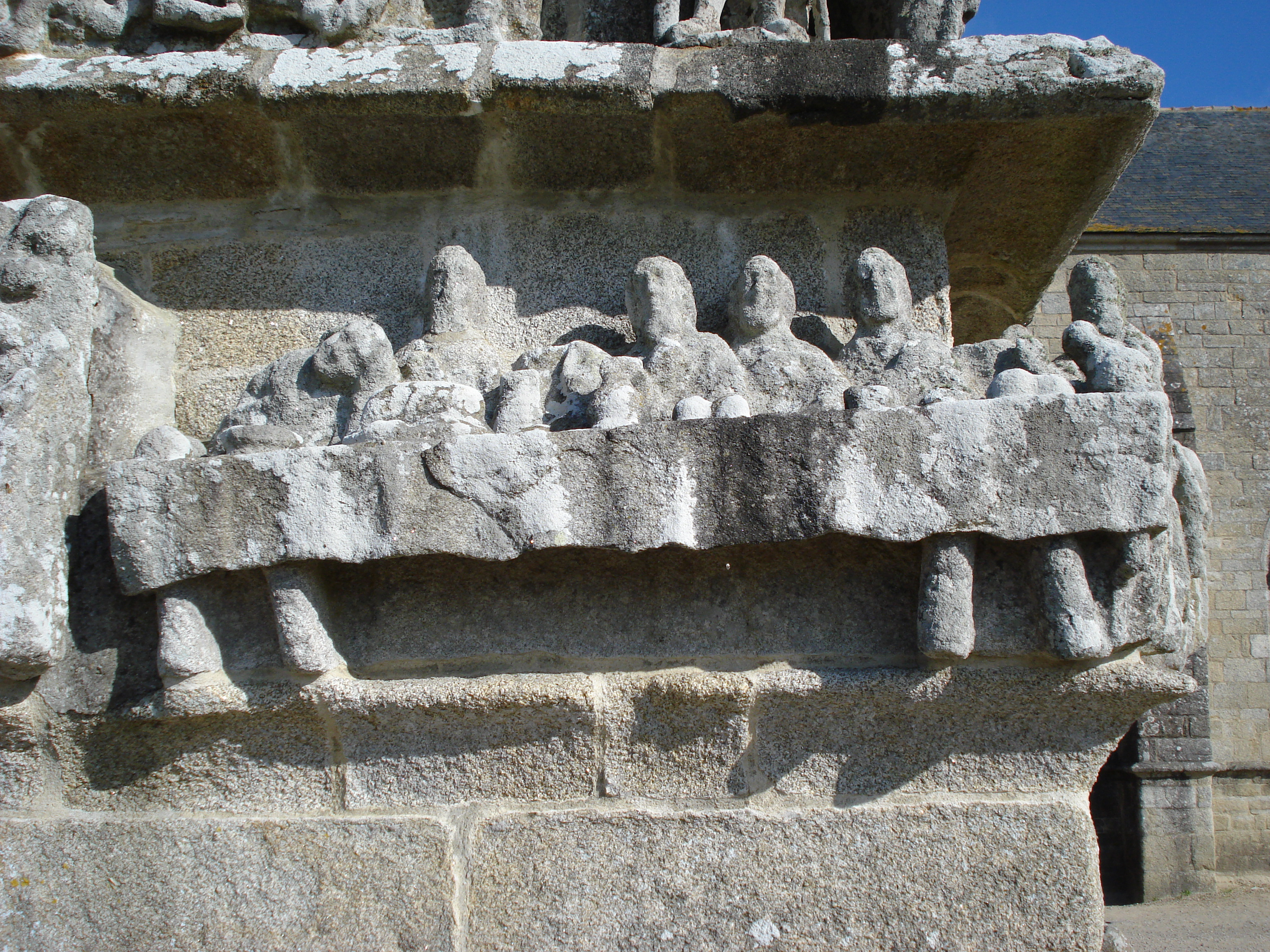
The Last Supper as depicted on the south east base of the Tronoën calvary

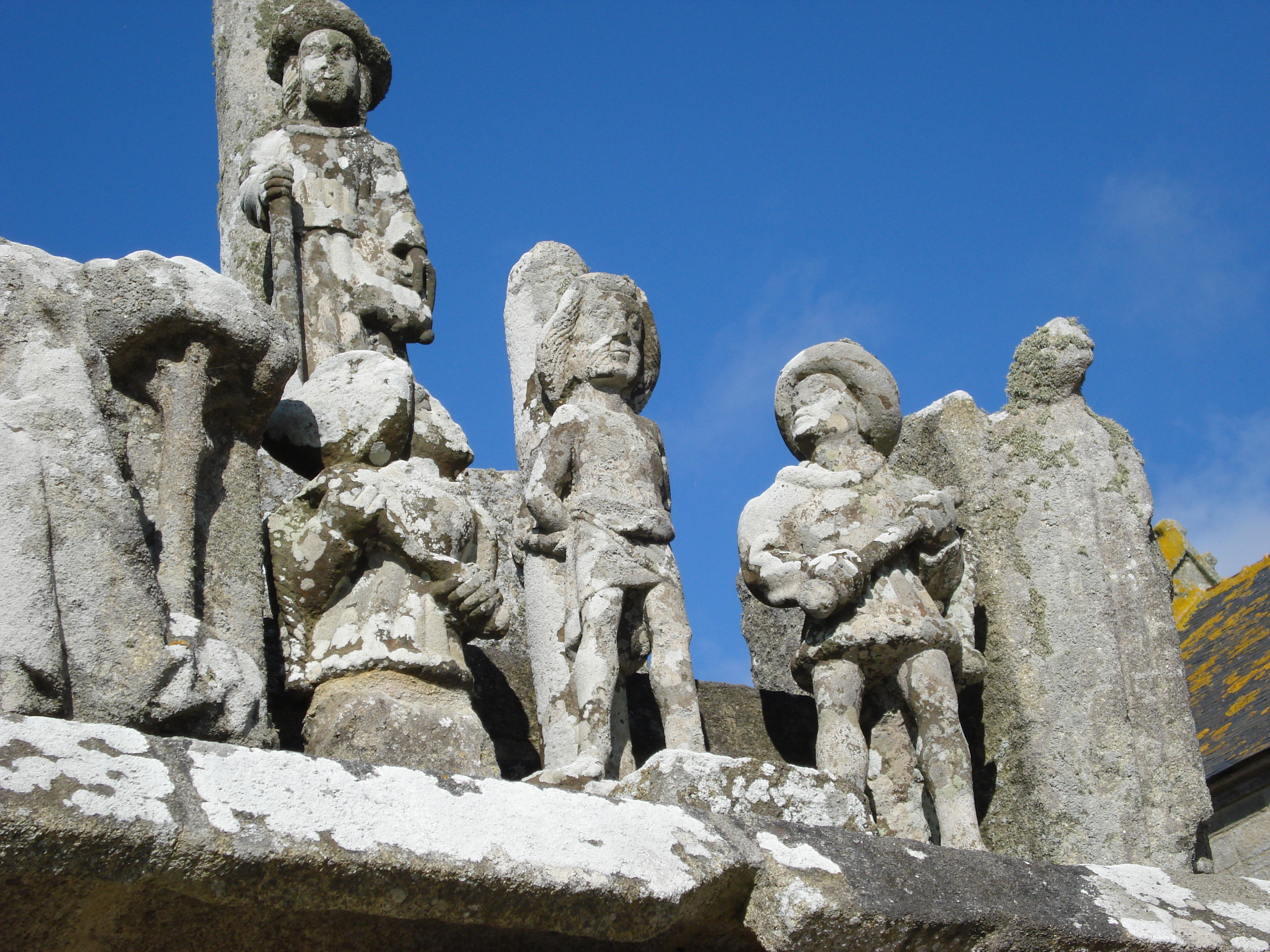
Jesus is whipped

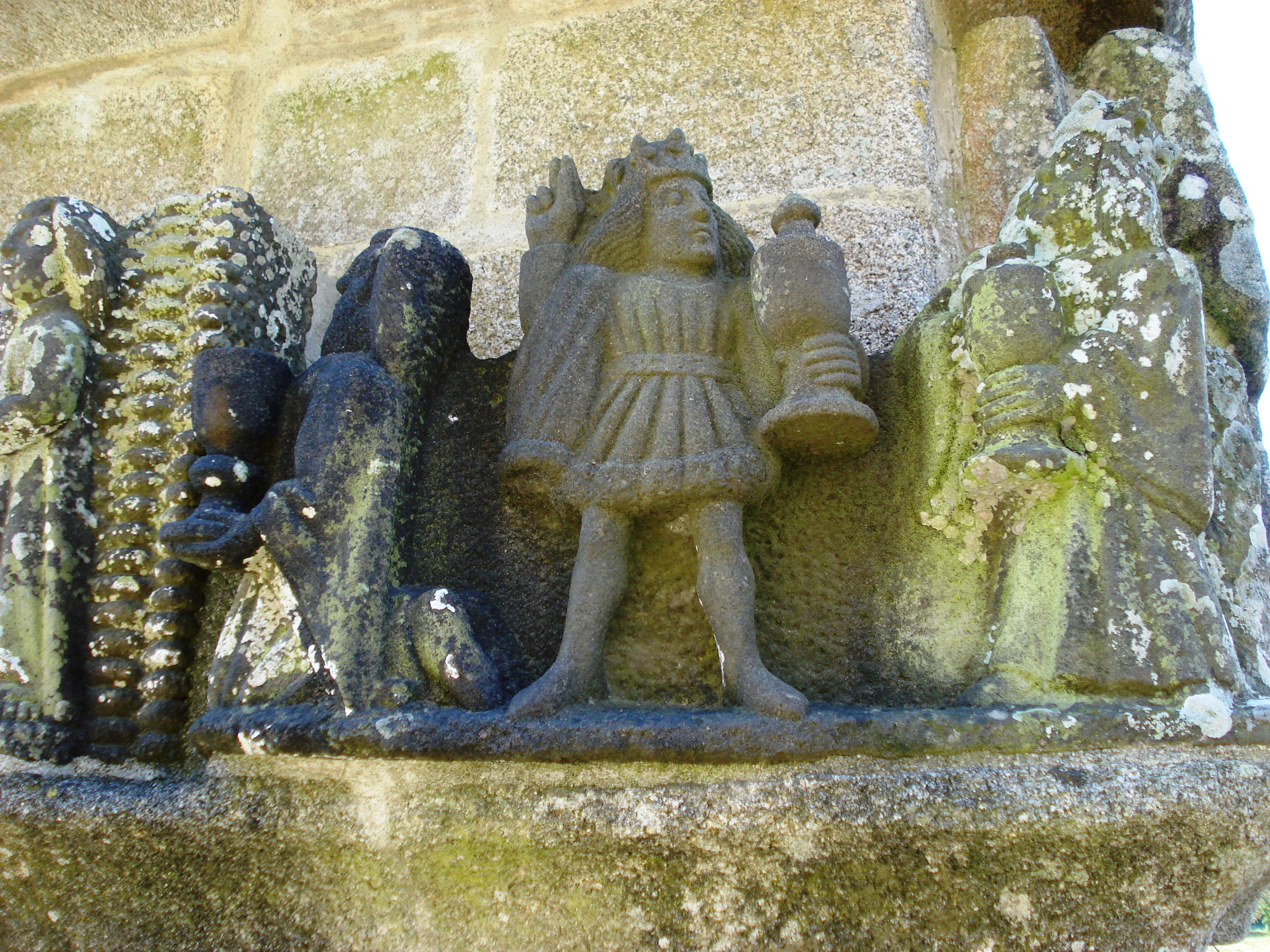
One of the three wise men points up to the star which had led them to the stable.

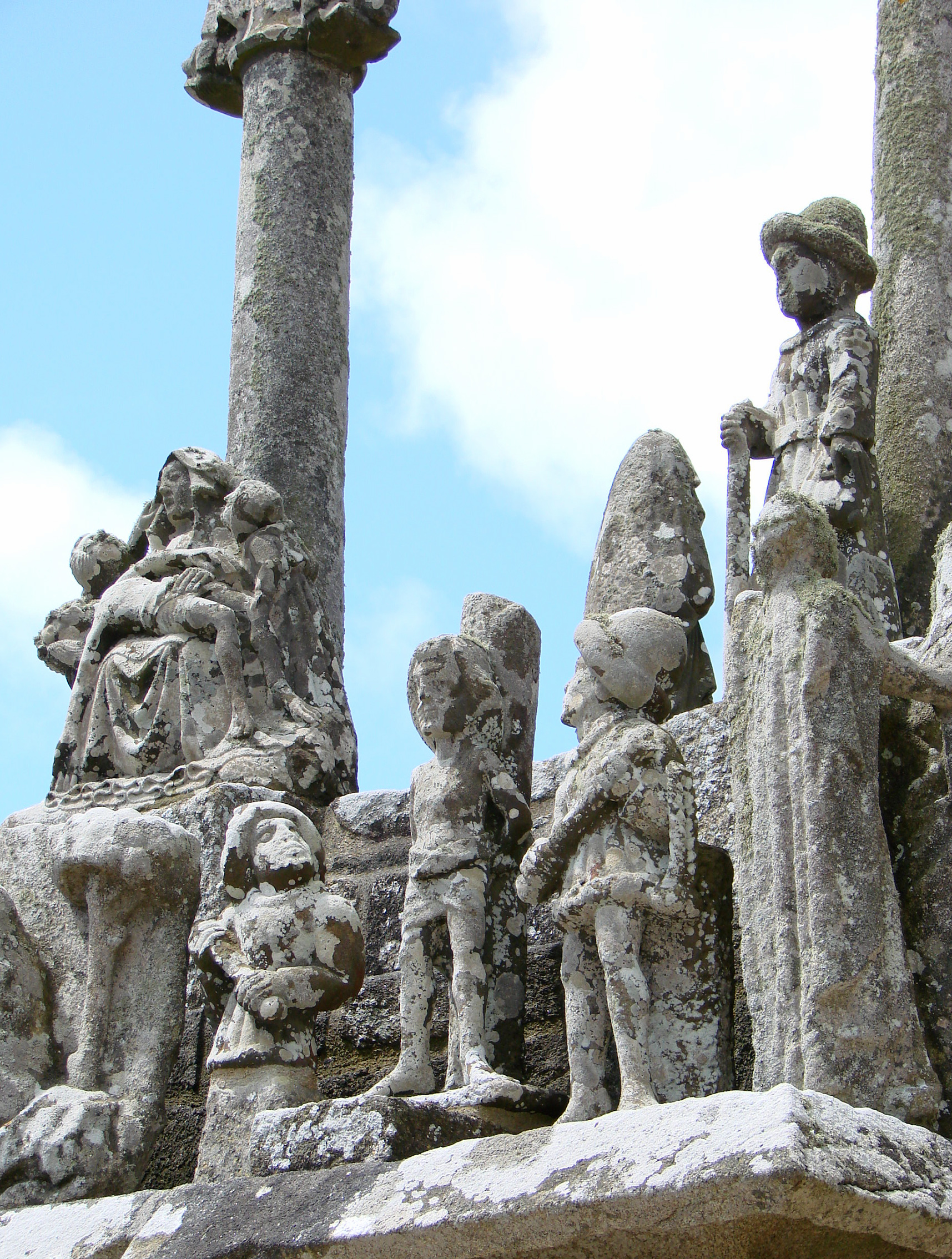
St James wearing a pilgrim's hat and with the "shell of Compostella" pinned to his chest. Below we see Jesus being mocked by two soldiers. We also see the pietà.

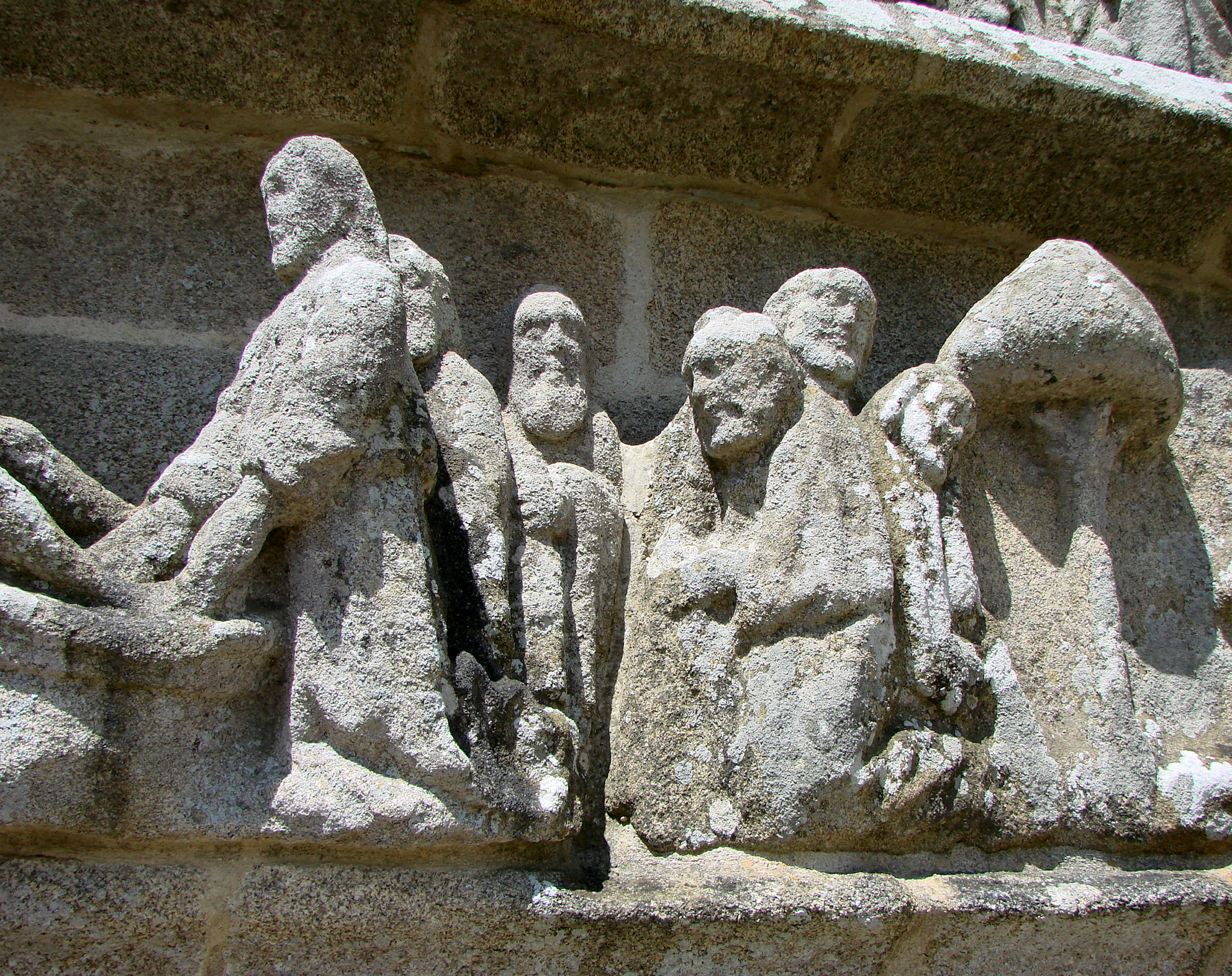
Jesus washing a disciple's feet

== See also ==
- Listing of the works of the atelier of the Maître de Tronoën
