= Plusquellec =

Plusquellec Pluskelleg
- Commune
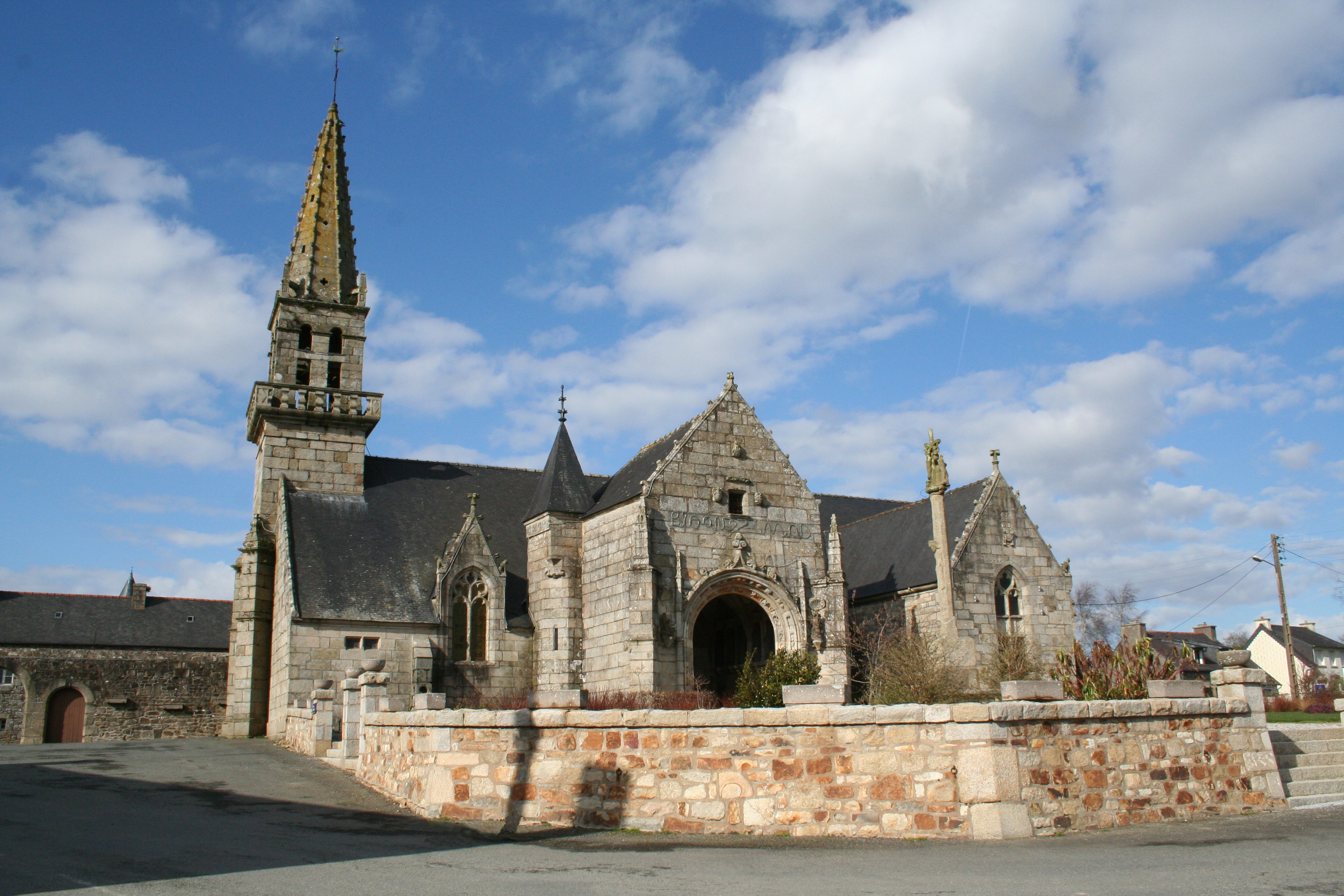
- The church of Notre-Dame de Graces

- Coat of arms
- Location of Plusquellec
- Location within France Location within Brittany
- Coordinates: 48°23′05″N 3°29′05″W
- Country: France
- Region: Brittany
- Department: Côtes-d'Armor
- Arrondissement: Guingamp
- Canton: Callac
- Intercommunality: Guingamp-Paimpol Agglomération

Government
  - Mayor (2020–2026): Jacques Le Creff
- Area^{1}: 26.31 km^{2} (10.16 sq mi)
- Elevation: 150 m (490 ft)
- Highest elevation: 273 m (896 ft)
- Lowest elevation: 104 m (341 ft)
- Population (2023): 559
  - Density: 21.2/km^{2} (55.0/sq mi)
- Time zone: UTC+01:00 (CET)
  - Summer (DST): UTC+02:00 (CEST)
- INSEE/Postal code: 22243 /22160
- ^{1} French Land Register data, which excludes lakes, ponds, glaciers > 1 km^{2} (0.386 sq mi or 247 acres) and river estuaries.

Plusquellec (French pronunciation: [plyskɛlɛk]; Breton: Pluskelleg) is a commune in the Côtes-d'Armor department of Brittany, in northwestern France.

== Population ==
Historical population
Year	Pop.	±% p.a.
1968	825	—
1975	699	−2.34%
1982	575	−2.75%
1990	551	−0.53%
1999	521	−0.62%
2007	512	−0.22%
2012	577	+2.42%
2017	527	−1.80%
2023	559	+0.99%
Source: INSEE

Inhabitants of Plusquellec are called plusquellecois in French.

== See also ==
- Brittany (administrative region)
- Communes of the Côtes-d'Armor department
- Listing of the works of the atelier of the Maître de Tronoën
