= Saint-Jean-Trolimon =

Saint-Jean-Trolimon Sant-Yann-Drolimon
- Commune
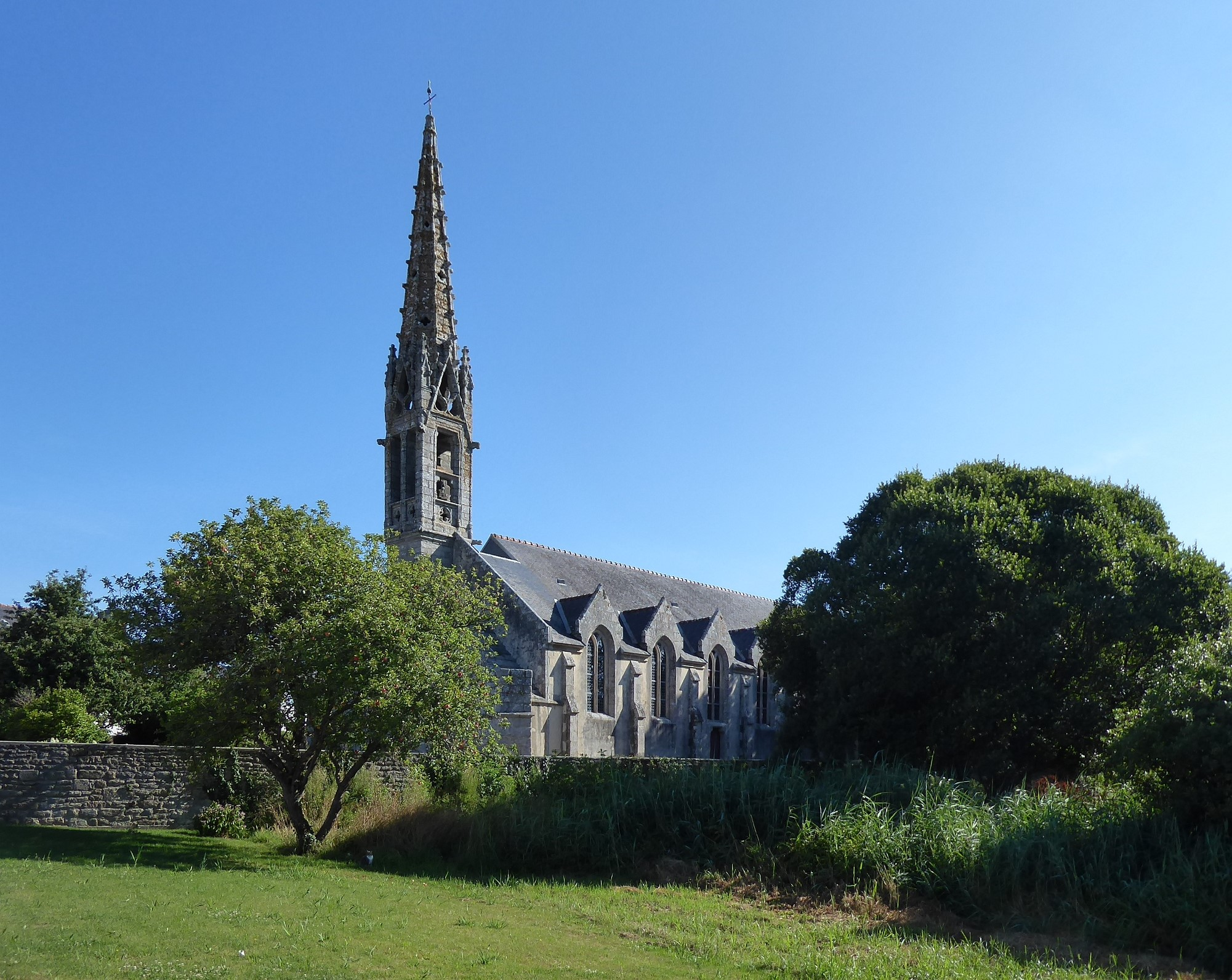
- The church in Saint-Jean-Trolimon

- Coat of arms
- Location of Saint-Jean-Trolimon
- Location within France Location within Brittany
- Coordinates: 47°52′01″N 4°16′46″W
- Country: France
- Region: Brittany
- Department: Finistère
- Arrondissement: Quimper
- Canton: Plonéour-Lanvern
- Intercommunality: Pays Bigouden Sud

Government
  - Mayor (2020–2026): Jean-Edern Aubree
- Area^{1}: 14.68 km^{2} (5.67 sq mi)
- Highest elevation: 56 m (184 ft)
- Lowest elevation: 0 m (0 ft)
- Population (2023): 997
  - Density: 67.9/km^{2} (176/sq mi)
- Time zone: UTC+01:00 (CET)
  - Summer (DST): UTC+02:00 (CEST)
- INSEE/Postal code: 29252 /29120
- ^{1} French Land Register data, which excludes lakes, ponds, glaciers > 1 km^{2} (0.386 sq mi or 247 acres) and river estuaries.

Saint-Jean-Trolimon (French pronunciation: [sɛ̃ ʒɑ̃ tʁɔlimɔ̃]; Breton: Sant-Yann-Drolimon) is a commune in the Finistère department of Brittany in north-western France.

== Population ==
Inhabitants of Saint-Jean-Trolimon are called in French Trolimonais.

== Breton language ==
The municipality launched a linguistic plan concerning the Breton language through Ya d'ar brezhoneg on 17 September 2004.

== See also ==
- Communes of the Finistère department
- The Calvary at Tronoën
