= Fouesnant =

Fouesnant Fouenant
- Commune
- Beach of Beg-Meil in Fouesnant

- Flag Coat of arms
- Location of Fouesnant
- Location within France Location within Brittany
- Coordinates: 47°53′39″N 4°00′39″W
- Country: France
- Region: Brittany
- Department: Finistère
- Arrondissement: Quimper
- Canton: Fouesnant
- Intercommunality: Pays Fouesnantais

Government
  - Mayor (2020–2026): Roger Le Goff
- Area^{1}: 32.76 km^{2} (12.65 sq mi)
- Highest elevation: 74 m (243 ft)
- Lowest elevation: 0 m (0 ft)
- Population (2023): 10,436
  - Density: 318.6/km^{2} (825.1/sq mi)
- Time zone: UTC+01:00 (CET)
  - Summer (DST): UTC+02:00 (CEST)
- INSEE/Postal code: 29058 /29170
- ^{1} French Land Register data, which excludes lakes, ponds, glaciers > 1 km^{2} (0.386 sq mi or 247 acres) and river estuaries.

Fouesnant (French pronunciation: [fwɛnɑ̃]; Fouenant or Fouen in Breton) is a commune in the Finistère department of Brittany in north-western France. Fouesnant is bordered to the south by the Baie de La Forêt.

It lies on the south coast of Finistère and is bordered by the communes of: Bénodet and Pleuven to the west, Saint-Évarzec to the north, and La Forêt-Fouesnant to the east. It has 15 km of coastline on its south side, with a long beach running west between the headlands of Beg-Meil and Mousterlin, as well as Cap-Coz just to the east at the top of the Baie de la Foret, making it a tourist destination. The town is in a very fertile area, is home to a number of orchards and is regarded as the source of the best Breton cider. This is celebrated each July with the Fete des Pommiers (Festival of the Apple Trees), an event that takes over the town centre with music, dance and various competitions. Fouesnant hosts a street market in and around the town square every Friday morning.

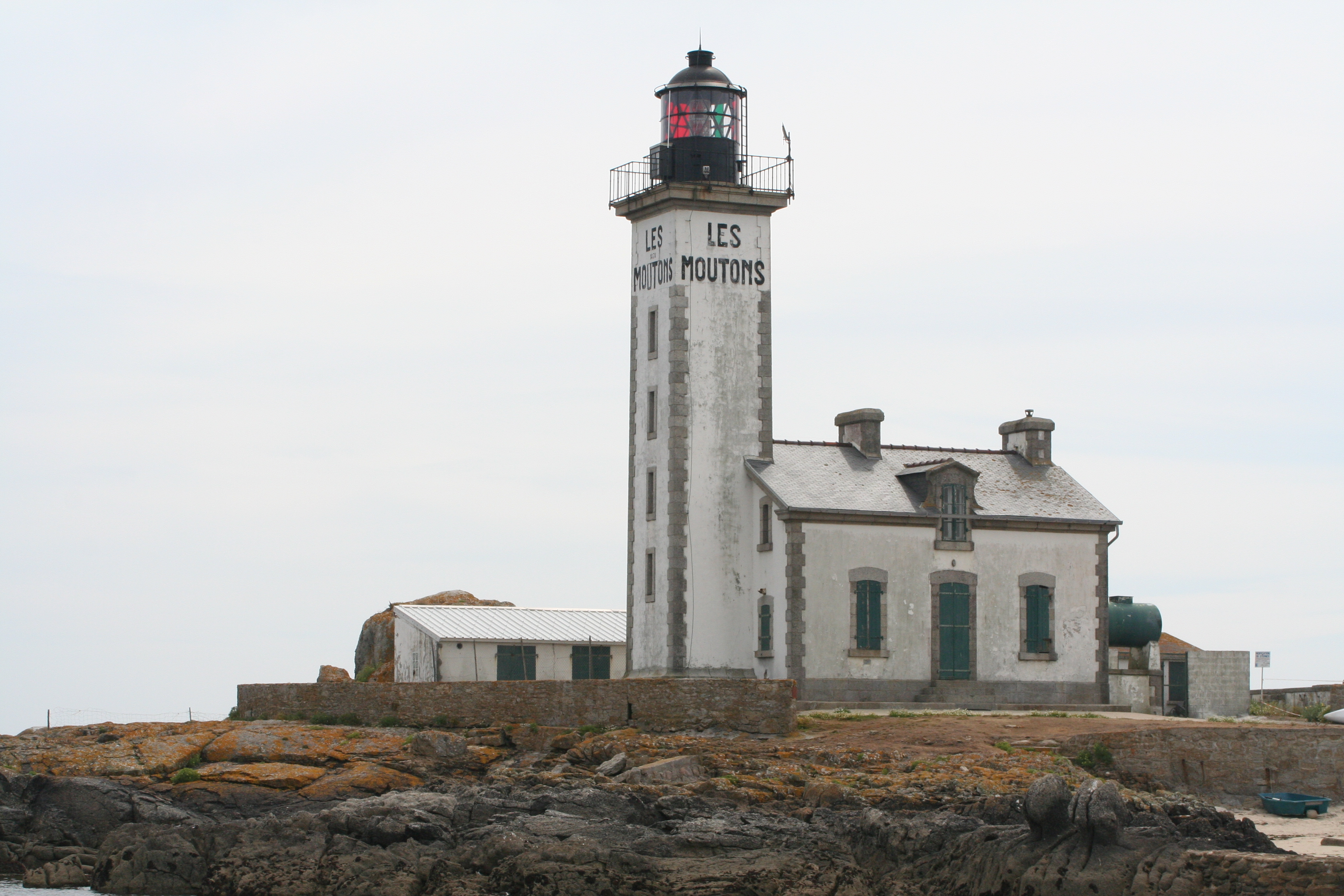
Île aux Moutons Lighthouse (Glénan islands, Fouesnant

The Glénan Islands, approximately 15 kilometres (9.3 mi) offshore, are administratively part of the commune of Fouesnant.

== Population ==
Inhabitants of Fouesnant are called in French Fouesnantais.

Historical population

Year	Pop.	±% p.a.
1793	2,573	—
1800	2,541	−0.18%
1806	2,385	−1.05%
1821	2,543	+0.43%
1831	3,120	+2.07%
1836	3,246	+0.79%
1841	3,172	−0.46%
1846	3,224	+0.33%
1851	3,363	+0.85%
1856	3,466	+0.61%
1861	3,335	−0.77%
1866	3,442	+0.63%
1872	3,461	+0.09%
1876	2,178	−10.93%
1881	2,225	+0.43%
1886	2,543	+2.71%
1891	2,776	+1.77%
1896	2,911	+0.95%
1901	3,214	+2.00%

Year	Pop.	±% p.a.
1906	3,350	+0.83%
1911	3,411	+0.36%
1921	3,260	−0.45%
1926	3,452	+1.15%
1931	3,499	+0.27%
1936	3,468	−0.18%
1946	3,537	+0.20%
1954	3,580	+0.15%
1962	3,758	+0.61%
1968	3,962	+0.88%
1975	4,653	+2.32%
1982	5,239	+1.71%
1990	6,524	+2.78%
1999	8,076	+2.40%
2007	9,793	+2.44%
2012	9,174	−1.30%
2017	9,458	+0.61%
2023	10,436	+1.65%

Source: EHESS and INSEE (1968-2023)

== International relations ==
- Twinned with Meerbusch in Germany

== See also ==
- Communes of the Finistère department
- Notre-Dame de Kerbader, chapel used as a meeting point ahead of the 1792 Fouesnant uprising
