= Bronislav Yermak =

Russian pilot and banker

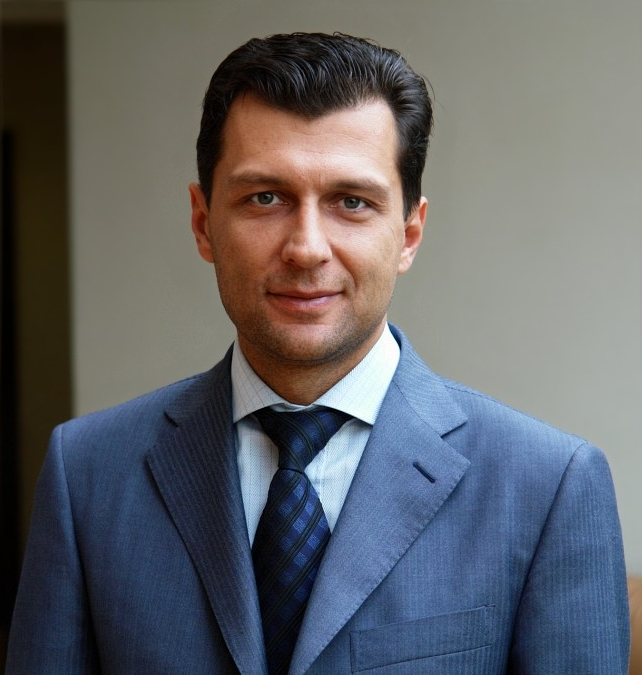
- Born: 7 April 1970; USSR
- Died: 26 April 2009 (aged 39); Tver Oblast, Russia
- Occupations: Aviator; MDM-Bank vice president
- Known for: Aviation accident

Bronislav Eduardovich Yermak (or Bronislav Eduardovich Ermak (Бронислав Эдуардович Ермак); 1970-2009) was a Russian aviator and later vice president of MDM-Bank. He was known as a banker, aircraft captain, and owner of the SP-2008 aircraft (No. RA-0321G, assembled in 2008, a modernized version of the Yak-52 originally produced in 1980), which crashed on 26 April 2009 in Russia.

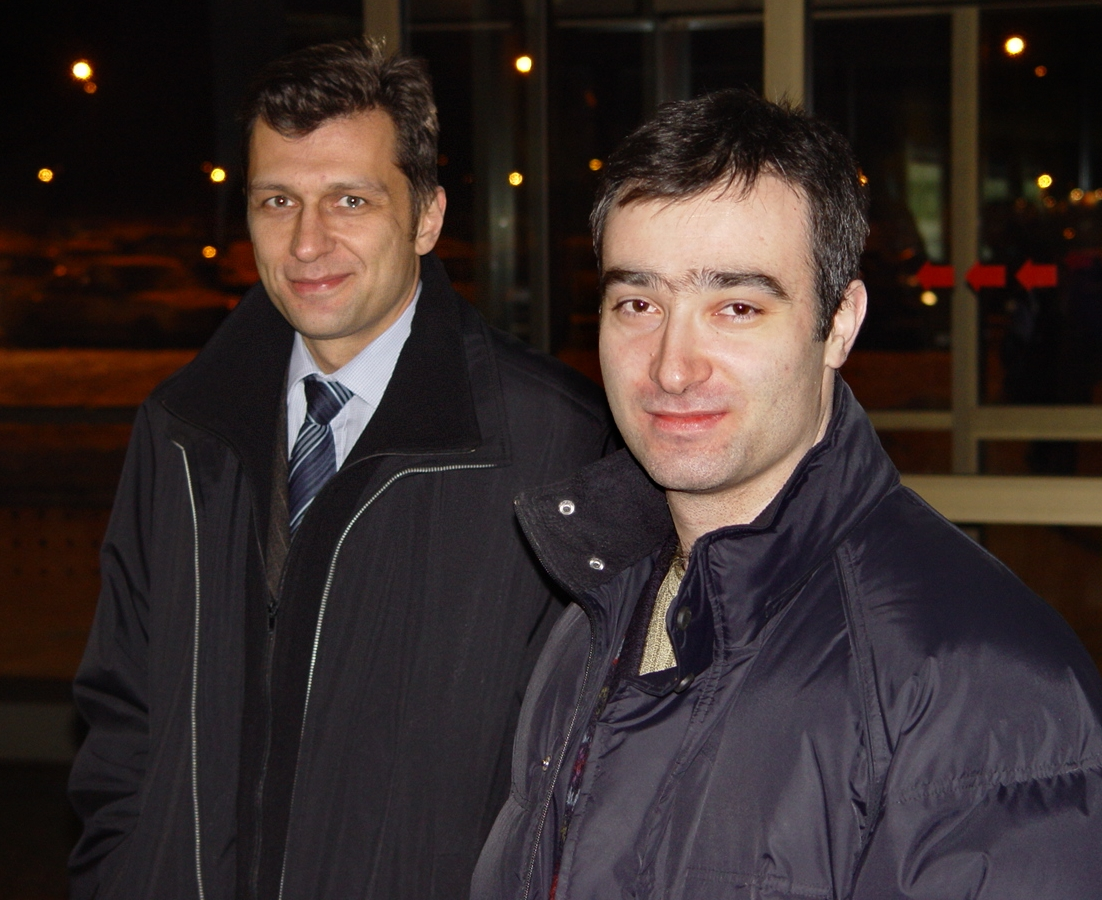
Bronislav Yermak and Arthur Arakelyan, MDM-Bank, 2003

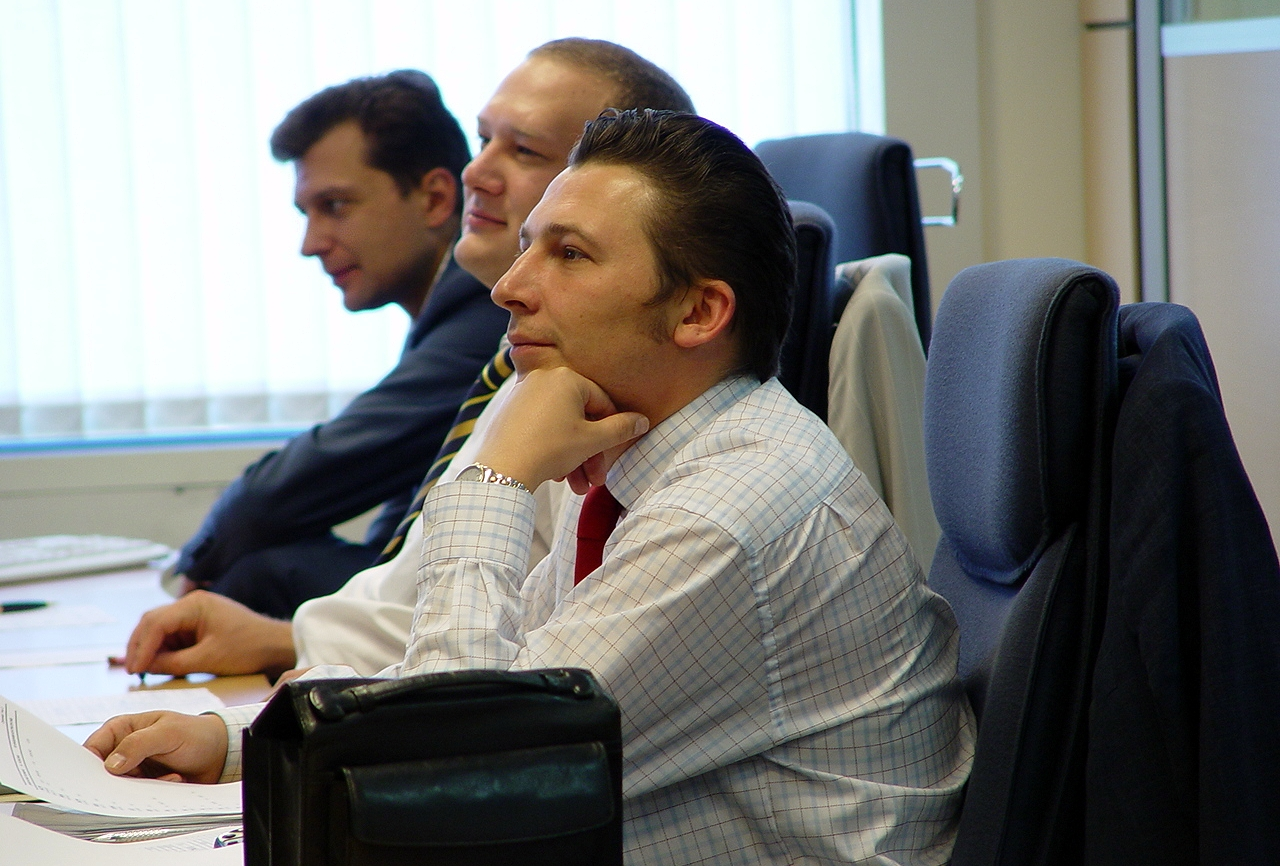
FOREX department at MDM-Bank, 2004

== Biography ==
Born on 7 April 1970. He was an experienced pilot who trained at the Tver Aviation School in his youth (1985–1987).

From 1988 to 1992, he studied at the Tambov Higher Military Aviation School (TVVAUL), specializing as a pilot-engineer, and underwent flight training on the Tu-134UBL aircraft. He resigned from the Air Force with the rank of Lieutenant shortly after graduating.

From 1995 to 2009, he worked at MDM-Bank, rising from a trader to head of FOREX operations (margin trading) in the currency market. He was known as a responsible and serious professional.

"Bronislav was truly passionate about the skies—he had been involved in aviation clubs since he was 15. After joining our bank in 1995, he never abandoned his hobby and often traveled to the Tver region," said Vasily Zablotsky, head of the financial markets department at MDM-Bank, to Kommersant.

At the aviation school, he was nicknamed "Bronya", while his banking colleagues called him "Bron" (his email address was bron@mdmbank.com).

He held a private pilot license No. 3186, issued by the Russian Flying Sports Federation on 16 May 2002 (the license had no expiration date).

On 26 April 2009, he died in a plane crash during a training flight in Tver Oblast.

== Crash ==
Near the village of Yuryevskoye (Kalininsky District), at the "Volzhanka" resort (a landing strip and general aviation airfield operated by the Moscow-based company "Klyuch").

On Sunday, 26 April 2009, at 13:01 Moscow time, the crew of the SP-2008 aircraft (an upgraded Yak-52) with tail number RA-0321G, consisting of captain Bronislav Yermak and co-pilot Alexander Ludanov, took off from the airfield on a heading of 230° into aerobatic zone No. 2, located two kilometers north of the point. The planned altitude was 700 meters.

Eight minutes later, the aircraft, with no radio communication and an inoperative engine, made an emergency landing on the central part of the runway with a tailwind of 5 m/s. The plane overran the runway, destroyed the airfield arrestor barrier (net), fell into the Volga River, and overturned with the cockpit submerged. The crew was unable to escape.

Rescue services arrived at the crash site within minutes. Initially, a cable was attached to the tail in an attempt to pull the plane from the water, but the cable snapped. Several people then lifted the Yak-52 manually, broke the cockpit canopy, and extracted Bronislav Yermak and Alexander Ludanov. However, they could not be saved—both had drowned.

From 27 April 2009 to 18 March 2011, an official investigation was conducted by the IAC. The findings concluded:

"The accident involving the SP-2008 RA-0321G occurred due to a forced landing with an inoperative engine and subsequent overrun of the aircraft beyond the runway into the Volga River, resulting from the following adverse factors:

- Unreduced vertical descent rate (recommended not exceeding 1 m/s);
- Excessive tailwind component of 8 m/s (maximum permissible speed 3 m/s);
- Landing at an elevated speed (~170 km/h, per the SP-2008 flight manual—120 km/h) mid-runway;
- Failure to use wheel brakes during rollout and non-deployment of landing flaps.

Non-compliance with section 5.2.2 of the SP-2008 flight manual regarding canopy opening at least 50 m above ground likely contributed to crew asphyxiation upon water impact.

The cause of the engine shutdown in flight could not be determined. The most probable cause was an improperly adjusted fuel mixture (rich mixture) at idle.

The engine had exceeded its service life and maintenance intervals. The aircraft was not airworthy.

The pilots were flying without proper certification and with invalid licenses."

In 2015, the wrecked aircraft was repainted and used in film production.

On Monday, 27 April 2009, an obituary and condolences to friends and family were posted on the official MDM-Bank website.

The crash received widespread coverage in Russian press and online media in late April 2009. The investigation led to scrutiny of light aviation operational standards.

== See also ==
- Aerobatics
- MDM-Bank, later MDM Bank
