= Michel Perhirin =

French banker

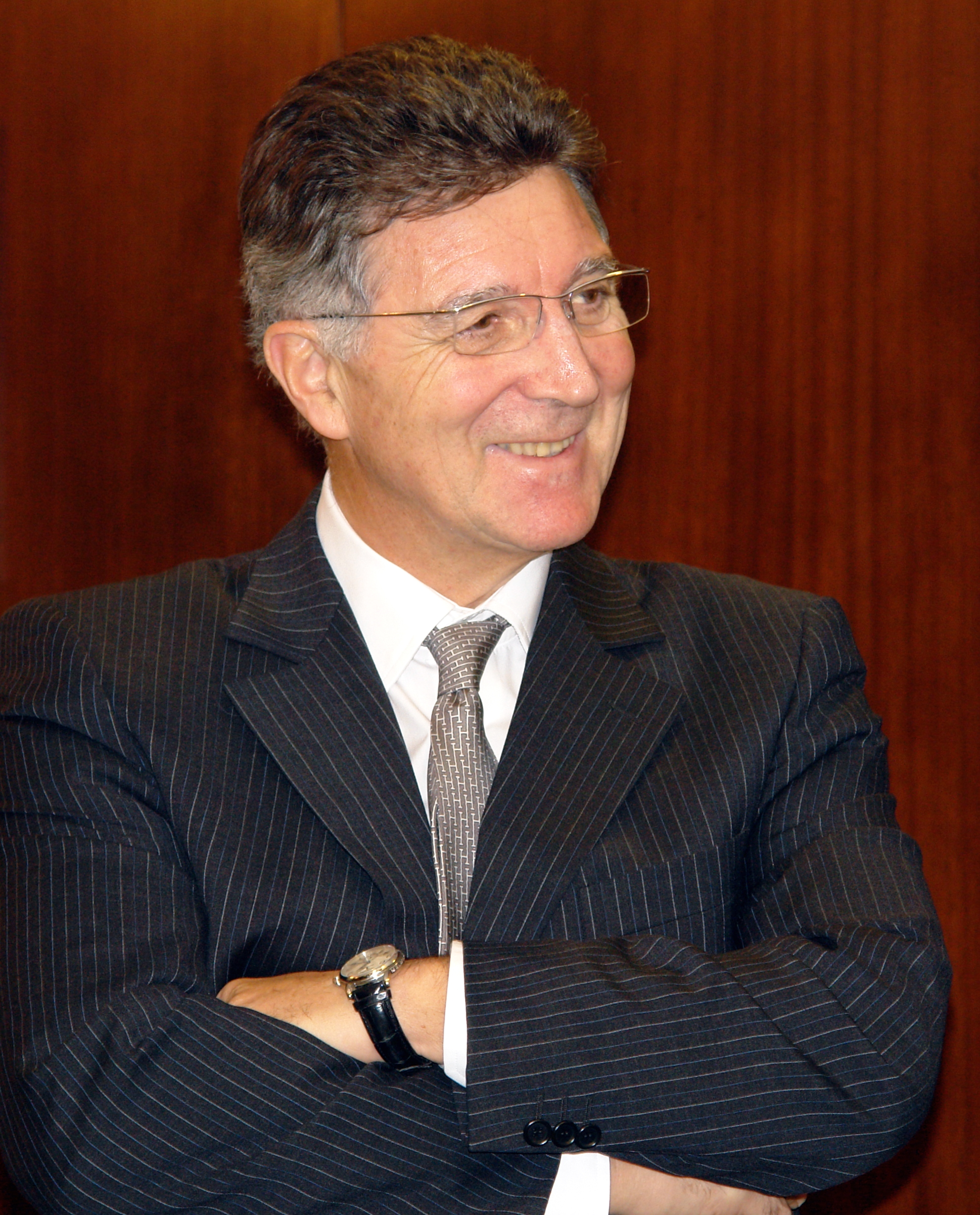
- Perhirin in 2007
- Born: May 29, 1944; Douarnenez, Brittany, Vichy France
- Died: January 22, 2019 (aged 74); Cornouaille, Fouesnant
- Education: University of Nantes
- Occupation(s): Banker in France, Austria, and Russia
- Known for: Chairman of Raiffeisenbank (Moscow 2001–2005), and later of Russian MDM-Bank (2006–2008)

Michel Perhirin (1944-2019) was a French international banker who worked at Société Générale then was chairman of Raiffeisenbank in Russia (2001–2005), and later of Russian MDM-Bank (2006–2008).

== Early life ==
Born on May 29, 1944, in Douarnenez, Brittany, Vichy France. In October 1968, he graduated from the University of Nantes with a degree in economics.

== Career ==
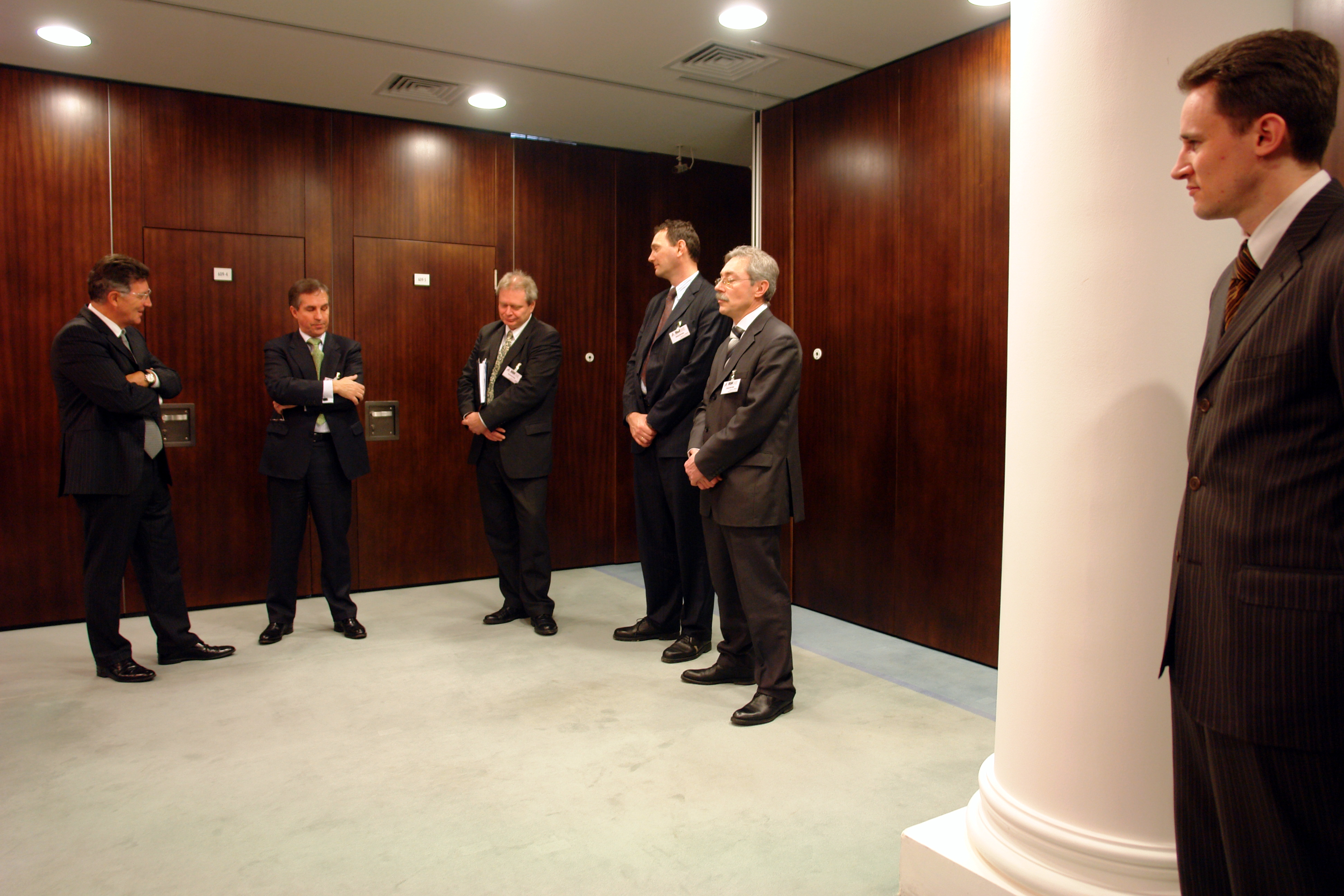
Signing an agreement with the IFC at MDM-Bank, 2007

He began working in 1969 at the banking group Société Générale, where he worked in subsidiary banks and branches of the group in various countries. He worked in France from 1970, the United Kingdom from 1976, Australia from 1983, Japan from 1987 and Spain from 1991. From 1993 to 1996, he headed the bank Société Générale Vostok in Moscow.

From 1996 to 2005, he served as chairman of the board at Raiffeisenbank Austria (Moscow). Under his leadership, Raiffeisenbank Austria, became one of the leading foreign banks in Russia.

In February 2006, he was appointed chairman of the board of Russian bank MDM-Bank. His goal was to create a large universal bank, increasing the retail loan portfolio fivefold by 2010, while maintaining costs, and building a network of 500 MDM-Bank retail outlets across Russia.

In December 2008, he stepped down as chairman of the board upon the expiration of his contract.

== Later life and death ==
He returned to his homeland in France, to the historic region of Brittany.

He died on January 22, 2019, at the age of 74, in the town of La Tourelle, at the hospital in Cornouaille, Fouesnant district.

== Recognition ==
- 2005 — Silver Badge and Diploma from the "Russia" Association
- 2008 — National Order of Merit (France)
