= Notre-Dame de Kerbader =

18th-century chapel in Fouesnant, Brittany

Coordinates: 47.8600°N 4.0225°W

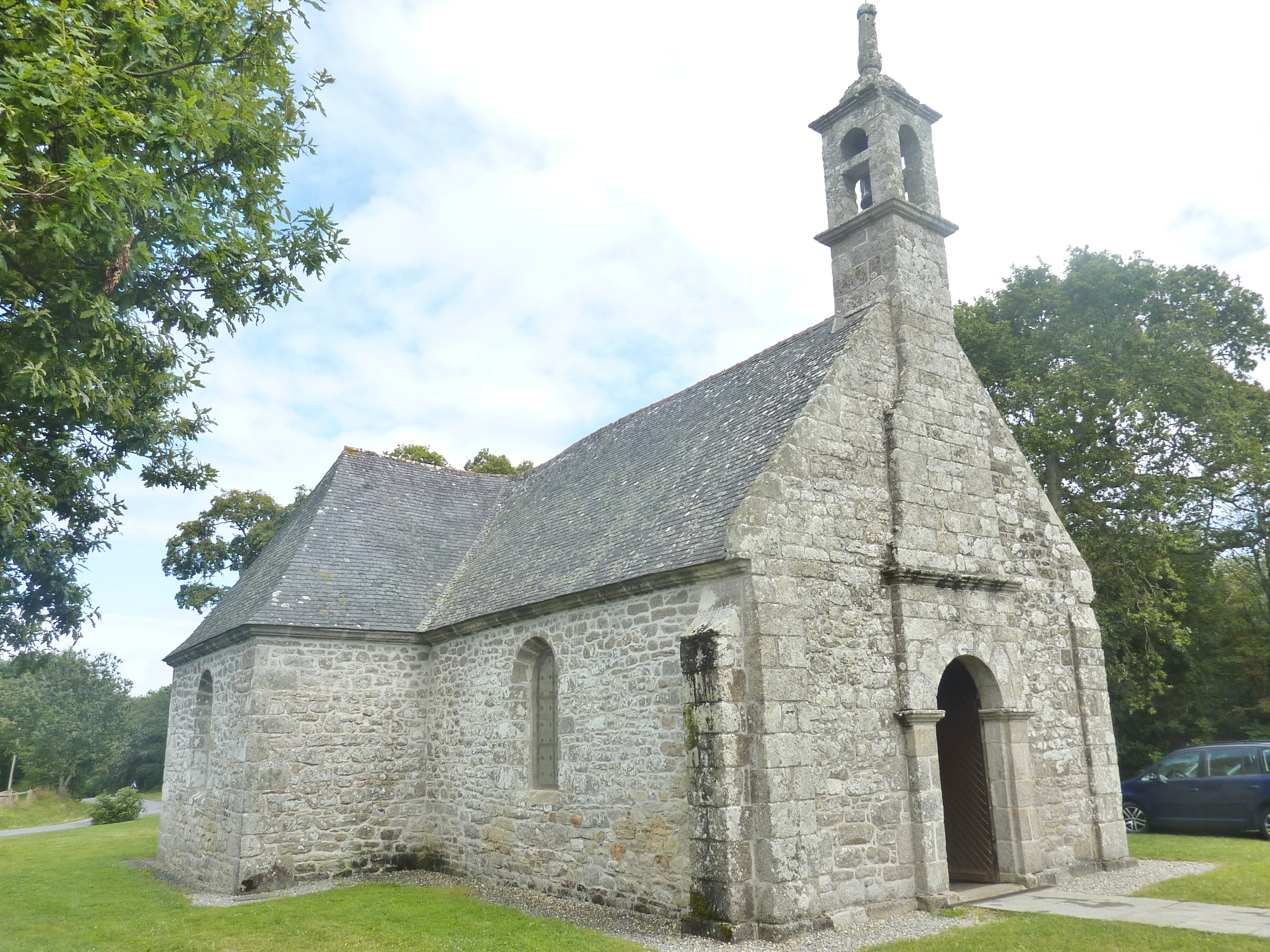
Chapel of Notre-Dame de Kerbader, Fouesnant

Notre-Dame de Kerbader (French: Chapelle Notre-Dame de Kerbader; Breton: Chapel Itron-Varia Kerbader) is a chapel in the commune of Fouesnant, Brittany in northwest France. The chapel is also known as "Our Lady of the Snows" (from the Breton Itron Varia an erc'h) or "Our Lady of Mercy" (Itron Varia an nec'h). It was built on the site of an earlier church, between the 17th and 18th centuries, to a cruciform floorplan.

In 1792, during the Fouesnant uprising against the revolutionary government of the Legislative Assembly, a group of armed farmers gathered at the church. The group were defeated by the National Guard and its leader captured, tried and guillotined at Quimper in 1793.

The building was renovated in the late 20th and early 21st centuries, with new stained glass windows unveiled in 2009. Next to the church stands a cross, Croix de Kernoac'h, which was renovated in 2004. Also nearby is a holy well, La fontaine de Kerbader, at which an annual pardon ceremony traditionally takes place during August.
