= MDM-Bank =

MDM-Bank (MDM Bank)

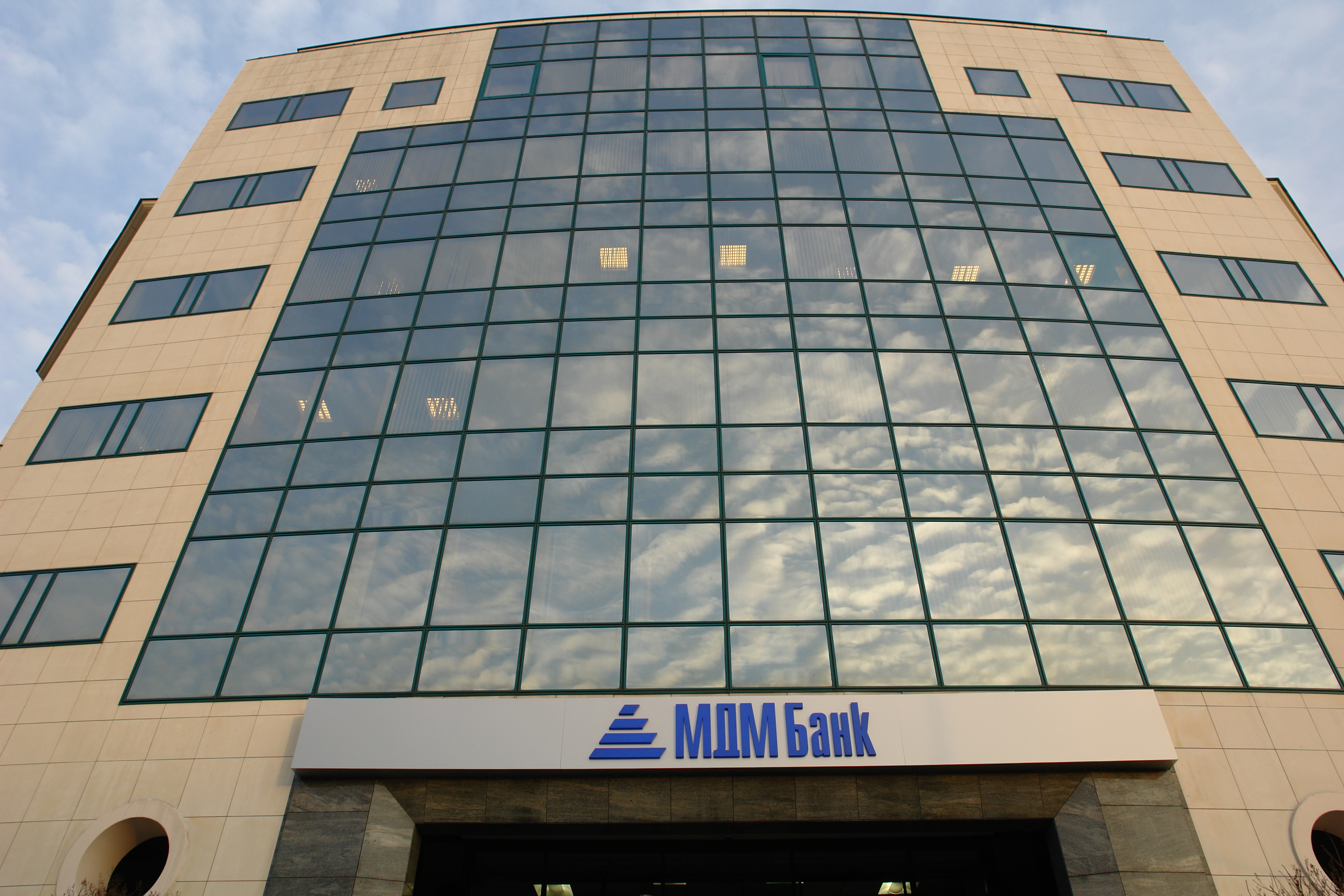
- MDM-Bank headquarters in Moscow (2005–2009)
- Industry: Banking, Financial services
- Founded: 1993
- Defunct: 2009
- Fate: Merged with URSA Bank
- Successor: MDM Bank (2009–2016)
- Headquarters: Moscow, Russia (with branches nationwide)
- Key people: Andrey Melnichenko (co-founder), Sergey Popov, Vladimir Rashevsky, Michel Perhirin
- Number of employees: 4,800 (2007)

MDM-Bank (Russian: ОАО «МДМ-Банк», abbreviation for "Moscow Business World", later "Interregional Business World") was a major Russian commercial bank that operated from 1993 till 2009.

In August 2009, MDM-Bank was liquidated following its merger with URSA Bank, with the combined entity being renamed MDM Bank (2009–2016) (without hyphen). The bank was registered in Novosibirsk with regional headquarters in Moscow, Yekaterinburg, and Novosibirsk. It was a participant in Russia's Deposit Insurance System under number 17.

== History ==
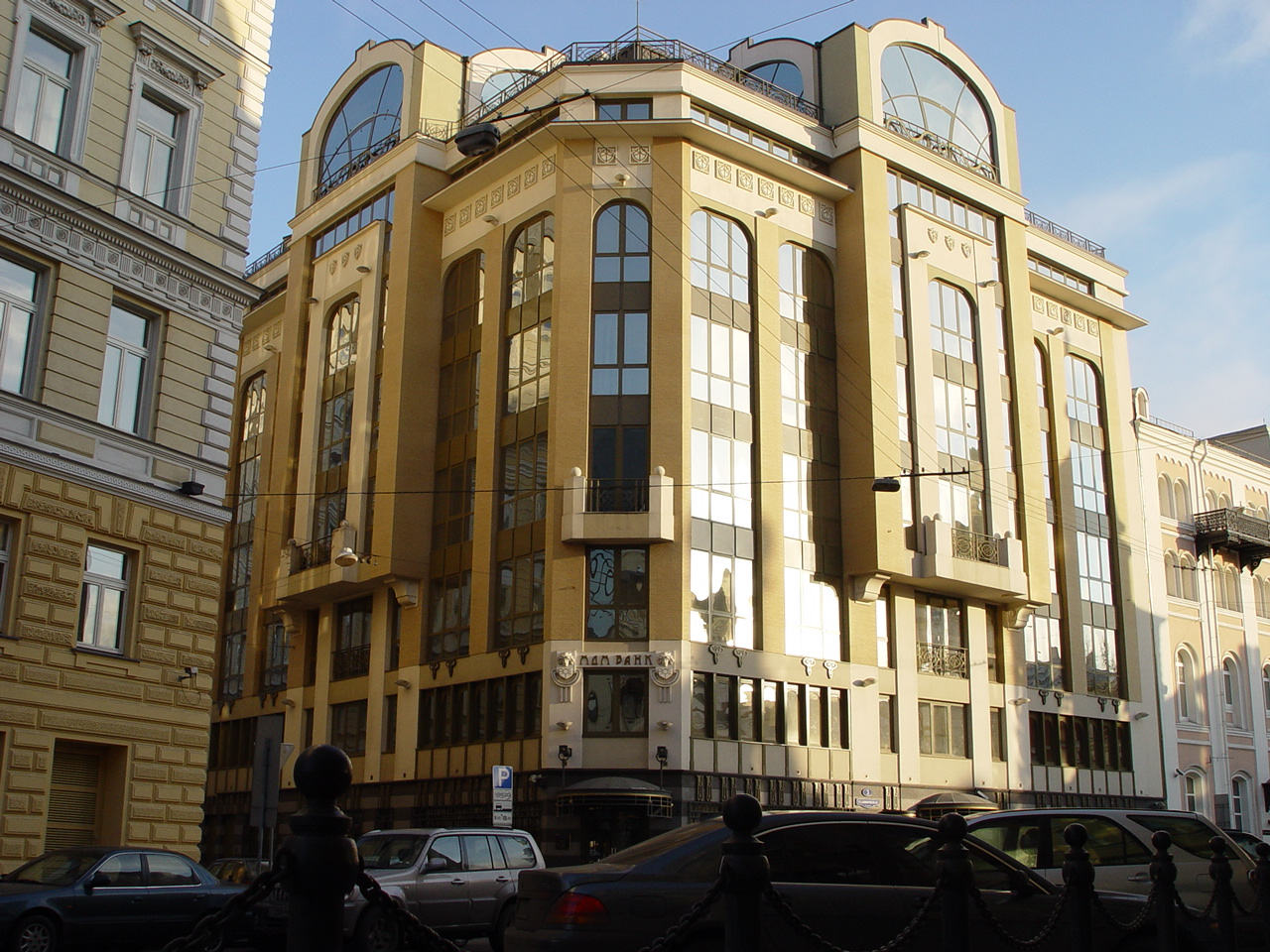
MDM-Bank headquarters in Moscow (2002)

The bank was founded in 1993 by Andrey Melnichenko, Mikhail Kuznetsov, and Yevgeny Ishchenko. It received its banking license on 1 June 1993.

In 2000, the bank became part of MDM Industrial Group and MDM Financial Group.

The magazine Global Finance recognized MDM-Bank as the best bank in Russia in 2006 for:

- Corporate governance
- Foreign exchange operations
- Best Eurobond arranger in the Russian market
- Best M&A advisor in the Russian market

In October 2006, MDM-Bank ranked first in Standard & Poor's transparency rating for Russian banks and received a diploma from Euromoney magazine as one of Russia's leading banks applying advanced corporate governance standards.

In 2007, MDM-Bank maintained some of the highest credit ratings among Russian private banks:

- Standard & Poor's (BB−, stable outlook)
- Fitch Ratings (BB−, positive outlook; A+ rus)
- Moody's (Ba1 NP/D, stable outlook)

It was the only Russian financial institution with a public corporate governance rating from S&P (6+).

In late 2007, the IFC provided MDM-Bank with a $100 million loan for SME lending and $100 million capital investment.

=== Merger and liquidation ===
On 3 December 2008, shareholders of MDM-Bank and URSA Bank announced plans to merge, creating one of Russia's leading private universal banks. The merger was completed on 10 August 2009. Prior to the merger, MDM Bank maintained strong credit ratings.

On 7 August 2009, following the merger, MDM Bank was liquidated by the Central Bank of Russia.

The merged entity was named MDM Bank (without hyphen), which itself was liquidated in 2016 after merging with Binbank.

== Management ==
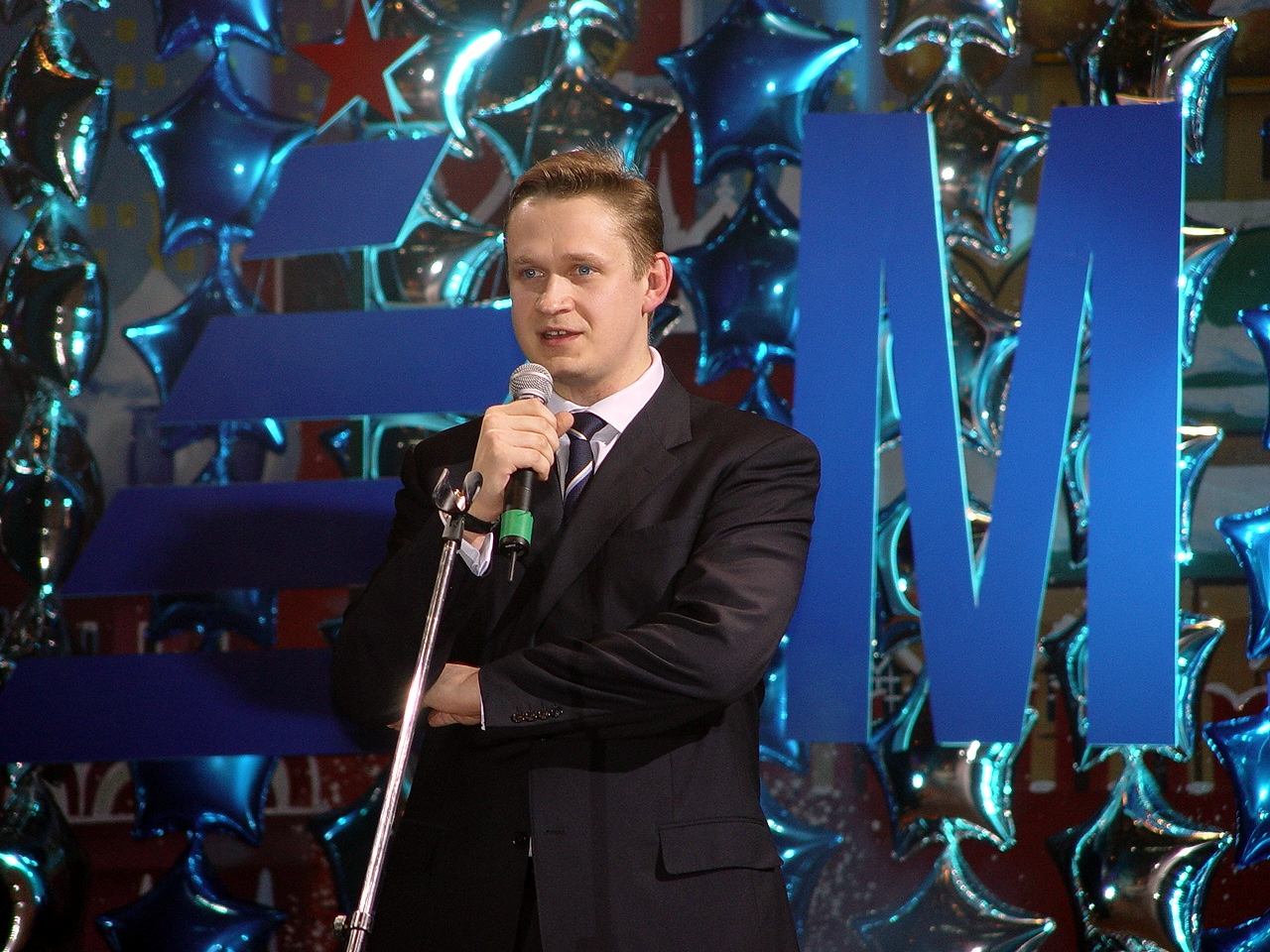
Vladimir Rashevsky, head of MDM-Bank (2003)

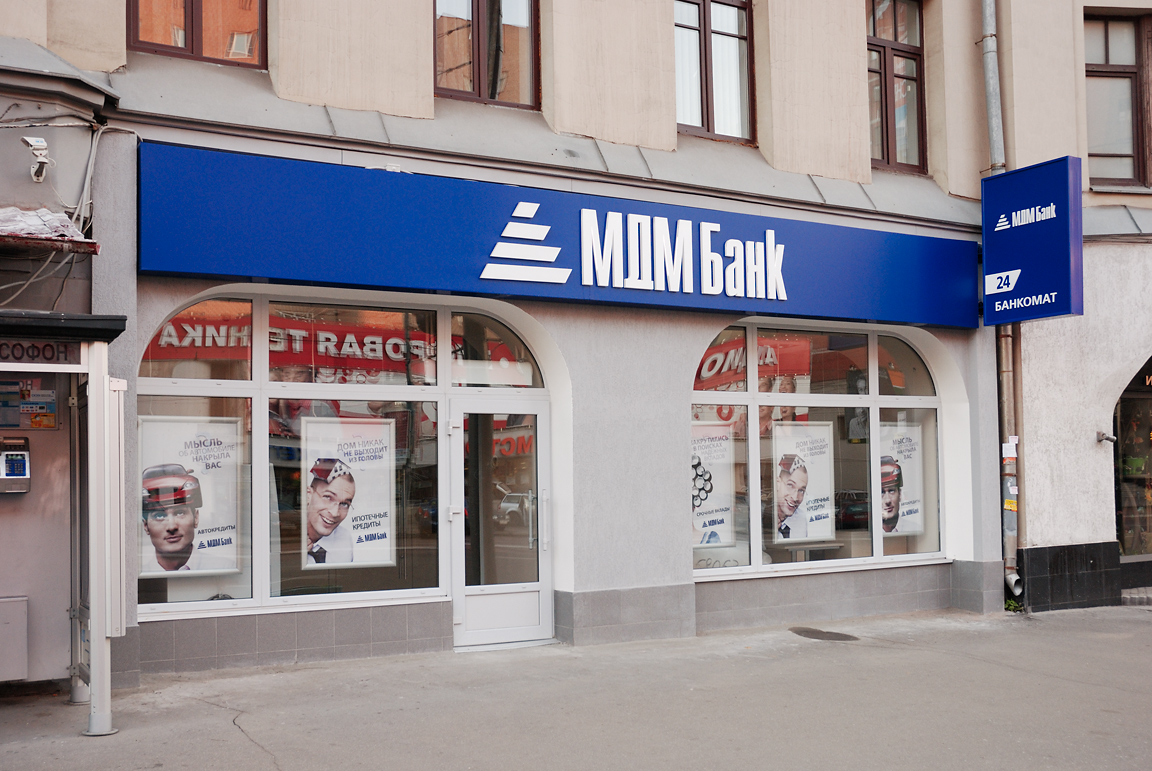
MDM-Bank branch in Moscow (2007)

Key executives included:

- Andrey Melnichenko (1993–2001) - Chairman
- Vladimir Rashevsky (2001–2004) - Chairman
- Andrey Savelyev (2004–2005)
- Michel Perhirin (2005–2008), former Raiffeisenbank executive
- Igor Kuzin (2008–2009) - Last Chairman

== Notable employees ==
- Bronislav Yermak (1970–2009) - Head of Forex operations
- Alexander Mamut - Board member
- Konstantin Malofeev - Head of Corporate Finance
- Slava Rabinovich (1966–2022) - Manager of MCM Capital Advisors
