= Baie de La Forêt =

Bay on the south coast of Brittany, France

Coordinates: 47°52′N 3°58′W

The Baie de La Forêt (Breton: Bae Ar C'hoad) is a small bay on the south coast of Brittany, France. The bay is located between Beg Meil (Fouesnant) and Cabellou (Concarneau).

== Gallery ==
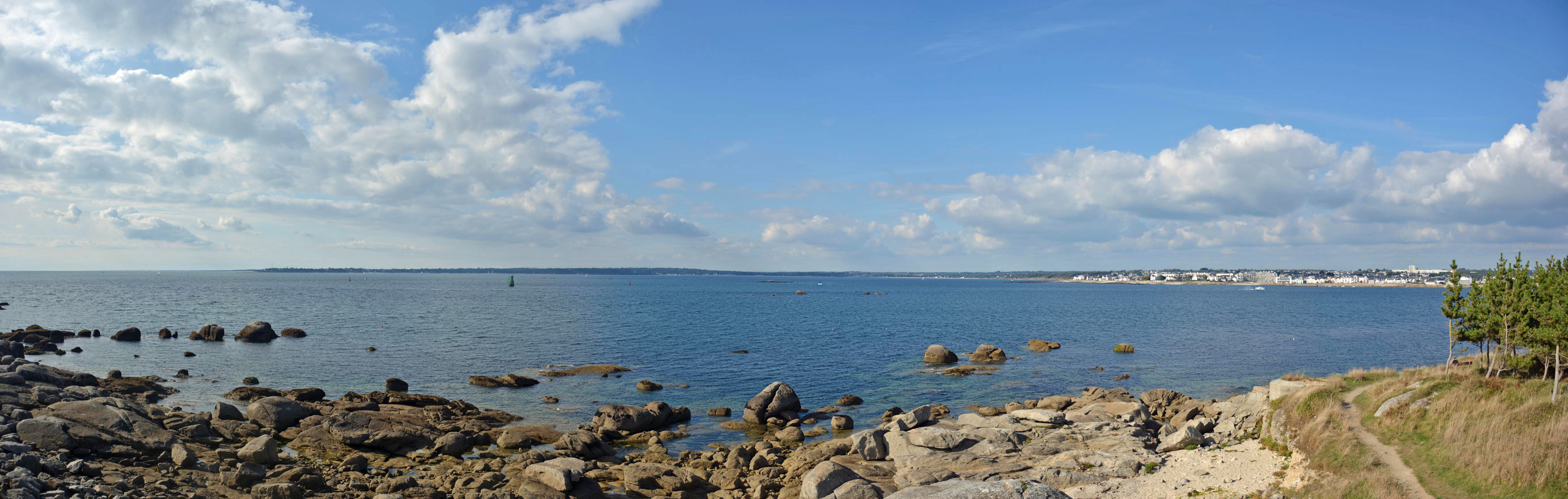
Baie de La Forêt

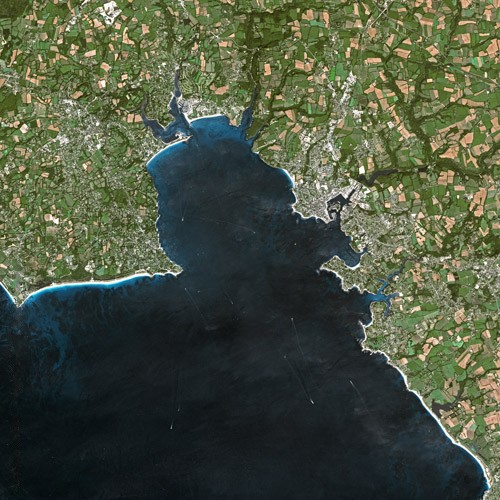
Baie de La Forêt by SPOT Satellite

== See also ==
- Concarneau
- La Forêt-Fouesnant
- Fouesnant
