= Canton of Fouesnant =

Coordinates: 47.89°N 4.01°W

The canton of Fouesnant is an administrative division of the Finistère department, northwestern France. Its borders were modified at the French canton reorganisation which came into effect in March 2015. Its seat is in Fouesnant.

It consists of the following communes:

1. Bénodet
2. Clohars-Fouesnant
3. Ergué-Gabéric
4. La Forêt-Fouesnant
5. Fouesnant
6. Gouesnach
7. Pleuven
8. Saint-Évarzec

== See also ==
1. Fouesnant
