= Slava Rabinovich =

Russian and US financial consultant and analytics

- Vyacheslav Yevgenyevich Rabinovich
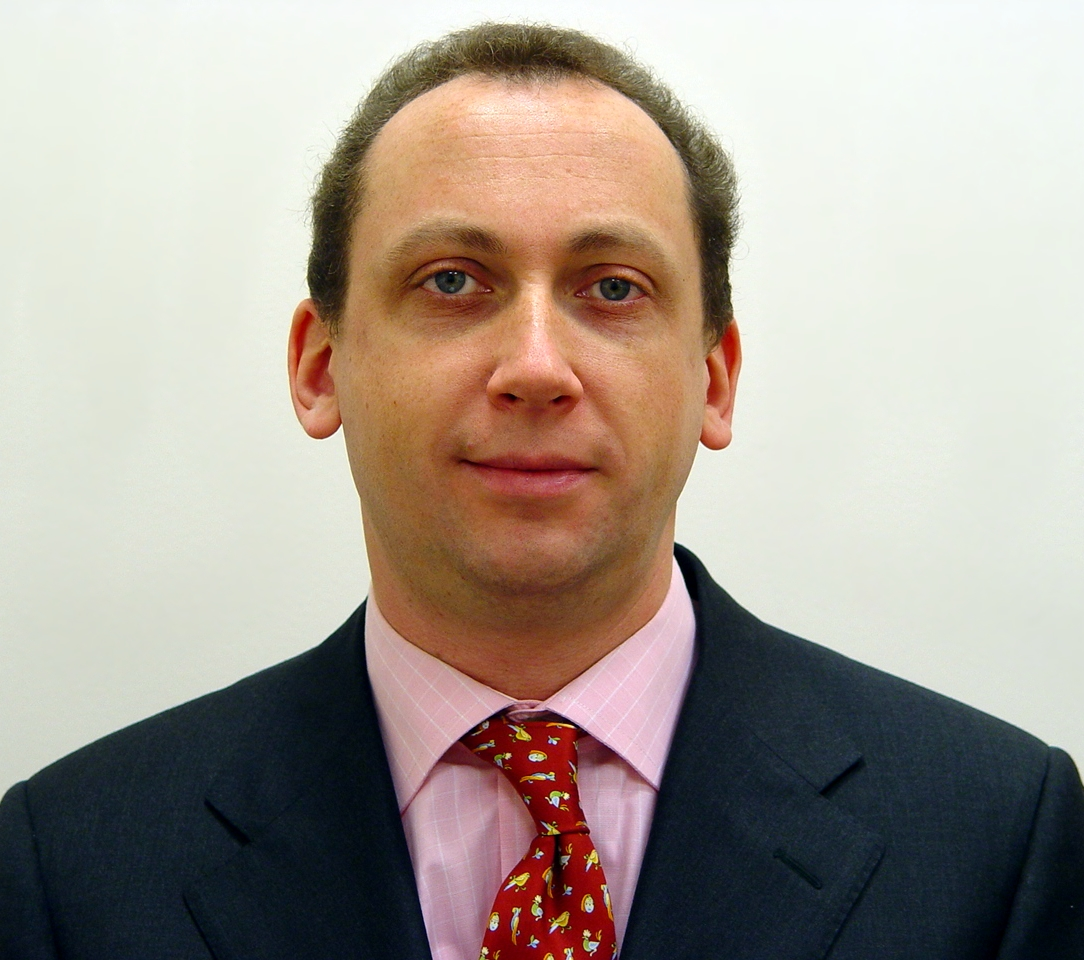
- Born: 6 May 1966; Leningrad
- Died: 5 July 2022 (aged 56); Israel
- Citizenship: United States, Russia
- Occupations: Investment financier, business analyst, economic and political commentator, internet journalist, columnist

Slava Rabinovich (full name Vyacheslav Yevgenyevich Rabinovich; Вячеслав Евгеньевич Рабинович; May 6, 1966, Leningrad – July 5, 2022, Israel) was a Russian and American investment financier, economic and political analyst, internet journalist and columnist.

== Early life and education ==
Born on May 6, 1966 in Leningrad to Yevgeny Iosifovich Rabinovich, a violist with the Leningrad Radio Committee's Grand Symphony Orchestra and later the Kirov Theatre Orchestra, and a Russian language teacher. His grandfather died during the Siege of Leningrad in early 1942 at age 40.

From 1983 to 1988, he studied at the Leningrad Electrotechnical Institute of Communications (Radio Engineering Faculty).

He left the USSR for Rome to obtain refugee status and permission to enter the United States.

From March to November 1989, he lived and worked in Italy on agricultural farms in Passoscuro, Ladispoli, Cerveteri, Santa Marinella and vineyards in Cerveteri.

== Career ==
From 1996 to 2000, he worked at Hermitage Capital Management under William Browder, specializing in investments in the Russian securities market. He returned to Russia to work in the company's Moscow office, serving as senior trader and later co-manager of the Hermitage Fund.

From 2000 to 2001, he was an asset manager at Renaissance Capital.

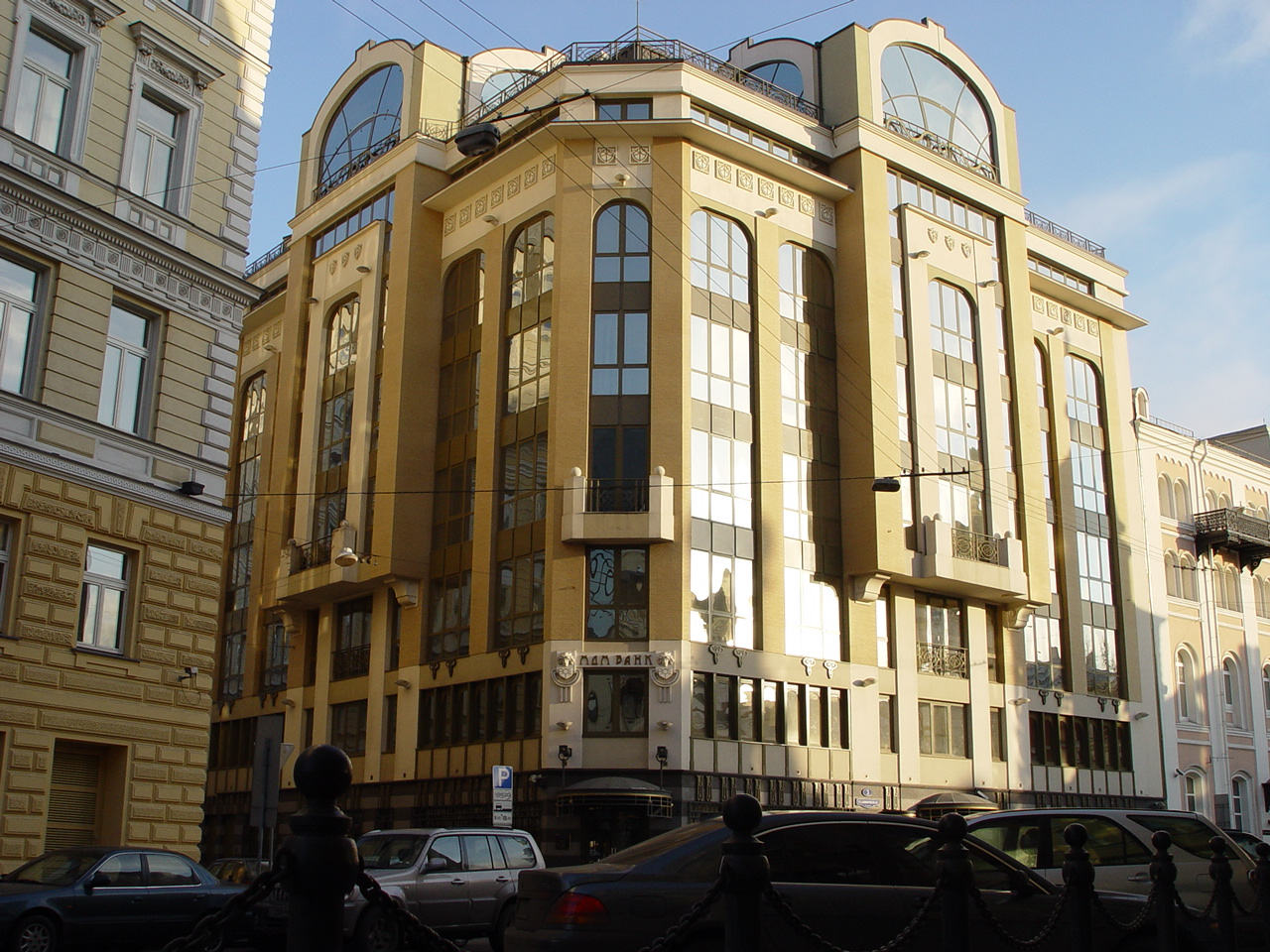
Former MDM-Bank building which housed MCM Capital Advisors' office in 2002

From 2001 to 2003, he managed investment company MCM Capital Advisors, affiliated with MDM-Bank.

Since 2004, he served as CEO of the investment management company Diamond Age Capital Advisors Ltd.. In 2013, the company managed assets worth $230 million. Its funds included:

- Hedge fund "Diamond Age Russia Fund"
- Investment fund "Diamond Age Atlas Fund"
- Private equity fund "Diamond Age Resources Ltd"

Since 2007, he became known as an economic and political analyst.

== Personal life and death ==
On September 22, 2021, he was hit by a car in Rosh Pina, Israel, suffering serious leg injuries, which he reported the next day on his social media accounts. He underwent surgery at Ziv Medical Center in Safed. His last public message was posted on October 15, 2021 on Telegram.

He died on July 5, 2022.

== Bibliography ==
- Leonard N. Bankers Trust and Derivatives // Stern School of Business. N.Y.: New York University, 2002. P. 18.
- Escaping risk // Forbes. 2007. N 8.
- Rabinovich's 15 percent // RBC Daily. 2013. No. 133. July 26. P. 8.
- Zhuravel Segal A. Russia's economy could collapse in months, says financial forecaster: Jewish social media personality Slava Rabinovich's apocalyptic visions of a crumbling federation may be quickly realized // The Times of Israel. December 27, 2014.
