= Saint-Évarzec =

Saint-Évarzec Sant-Evarzeg
- Commune
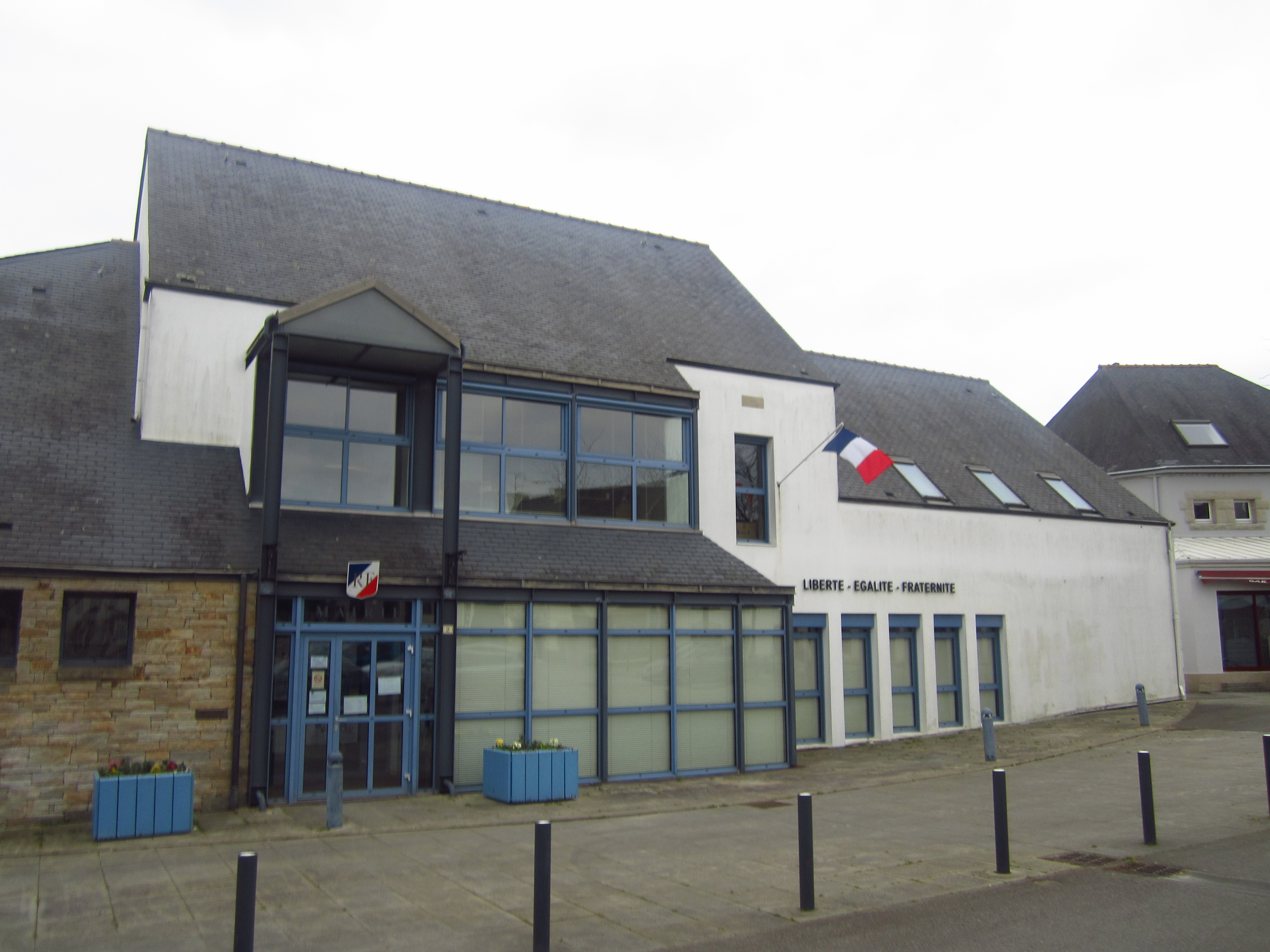
- The town hall in Saint-Évarzec

- Coat of arms
- Location of Saint-Évarzec
- Location within France Location within Brittany
- Coordinates: 47°56′15″N 4°01′08″W
- Country: France
- Region: Brittany
- Department: Finistère
- Arrondissement: Quimper
- Canton: Fouesnant
- Intercommunality: Pays Fouesnantais

Government
  - Mayor (2020–2026): René Rocuet
- Area^{1}: 24.65 km^{2} (9.52 sq mi)
- Highest elevation: 102 m (335 ft)
- Lowest elevation: 8 m (26 ft)
- Population (2023): 3,574
  - Density: 145.0/km^{2} (375.5/sq mi)
- Time zone: UTC+01:00 (CET)
  - Summer (DST): UTC+02:00 (CEST)
- INSEE/Postal code: 29247 /29170
- ^{1} French Land Register data, which excludes lakes, ponds, glaciers > 1 km^{2} (0.386 sq mi or 247 acres) and river estuaries.

Saint-Évarzec (French pronunciation: [sɛ̃.t‿evaʁzɛk]; Breton: Sant-Evarzeg) is a commune in the Finistère department of Brittany in north-western France.

== Population ==
Inhabitants of Saint-Évarzec are called in French Varzécois or Saint-Évarzecois.

Historical population
Year	Pop.	±% p.a.
1968	1,362	—
1975	1,917	+5.00%
1982	2,525	+4.01%
1990	2,966	+2.03%
1999	2,897	−0.26%
2007	3,209	+1.29%
2012	3,551	+2.05%
2017	3,529	−0.12%
2023	3,574	+0.21%
Source: INSEE

== Breton language ==
The municipality launched a linguistic plan through Ya d'ar brezhoneg on 26 September 2008.

== See also ==
- Communes of the Finistère department
