= La Forêt-Fouesnant =

La Forêt-Fouesnant Ar Forest Fouenant
- Commune
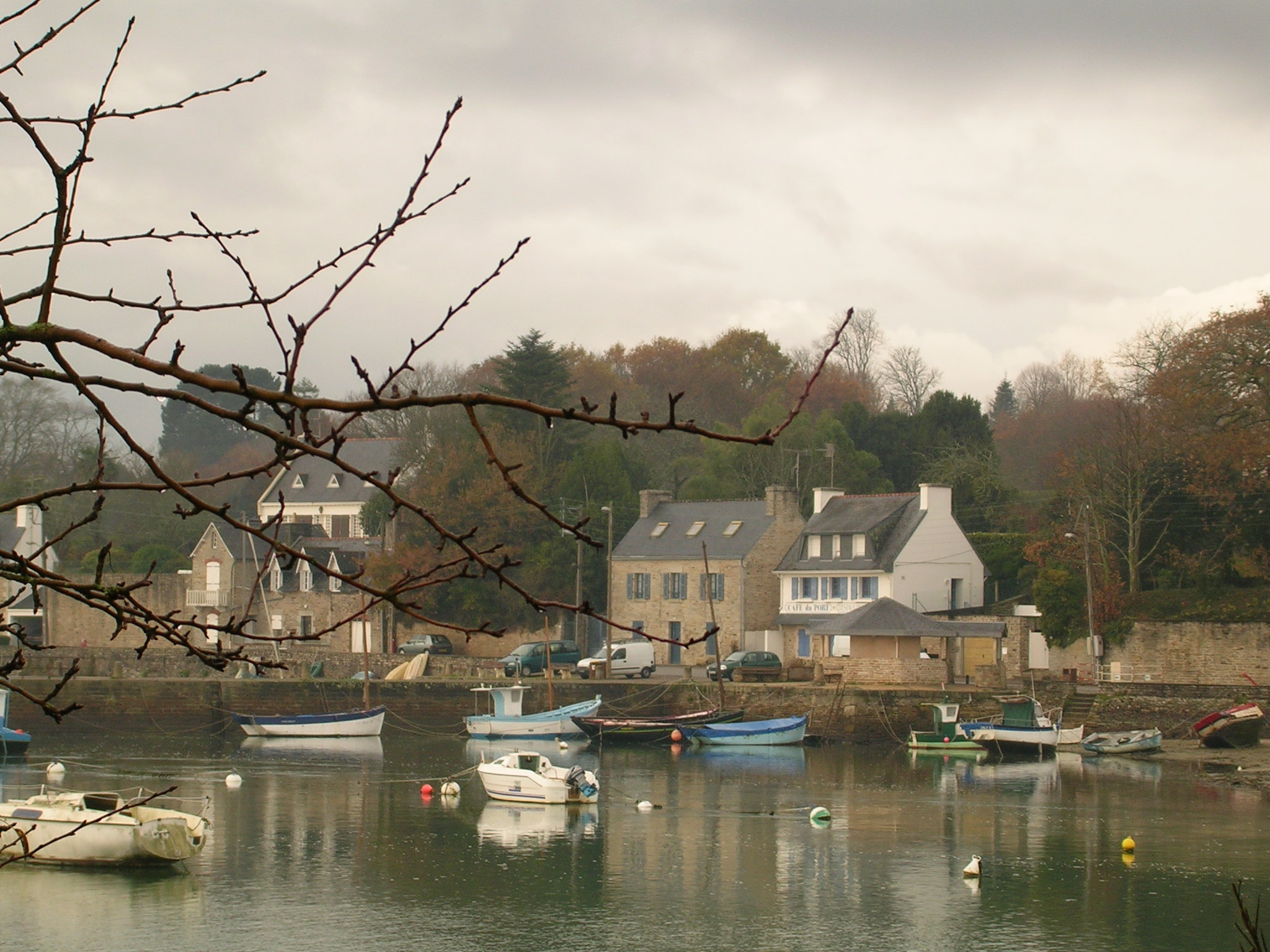
- Old port

- Coat of arms
- Location of La Forêt-Fouesnant
- Location within France Location within Brittany
- Coordinates: 47°54′36″N 3°58′40″W
- Country: France
- Region: Brittany
- Department: Finistère
- Arrondissement: Quimper
- Canton: Fouesnant
- Intercommunality: Pays Fouesnantais

Government
  - Mayor (2020–2026): Daniel Goyat
- Area^{1}: 18.53 km^{2} (7.15 sq mi)
- Highest elevation: 98 m (322 ft)
- Lowest elevation: 0 m (0 ft)
- Population (2023): 3,508
  - Density: 189.3/km^{2} (490.3/sq mi)
- Time zone: UTC+01:00 (CET)
  - Summer (DST): UTC+02:00 (CEST)
- INSEE/Postal code: 29057 /29940
- ^{1} French Land Register data, which excludes lakes, ponds, glaciers > 1 km^{2} (0.386 sq mi or 247 acres) and river estuaries.

La Forêt-Fouesnant (French pronunciation: [la fɔʁɛ fwɛnɑ̃]; Breton: Ar Forest Fouenant or simply Ar Forest) is a commune in the Finistère department in Brittany in northwestern France. La Forêt-Fouesnant is bordered to the south by the Baie de La Forêt.

== Population ==
Inhabitants of La Forêt-Fouesnant are called Forestois.

Historical population
Year	Pop.	±% p.a.
1968	1,778	—
1975	2,060	+2.13%
1982	2,148	+0.60%
1990	2,369	+1.23%
1999	2,809	+1.91%
2007	3,211	+1.69%
2012	3,276	+0.40%
2017	3,366	+0.54%
2023	3,508	+0.69%
Source: INSEE

== See also ==
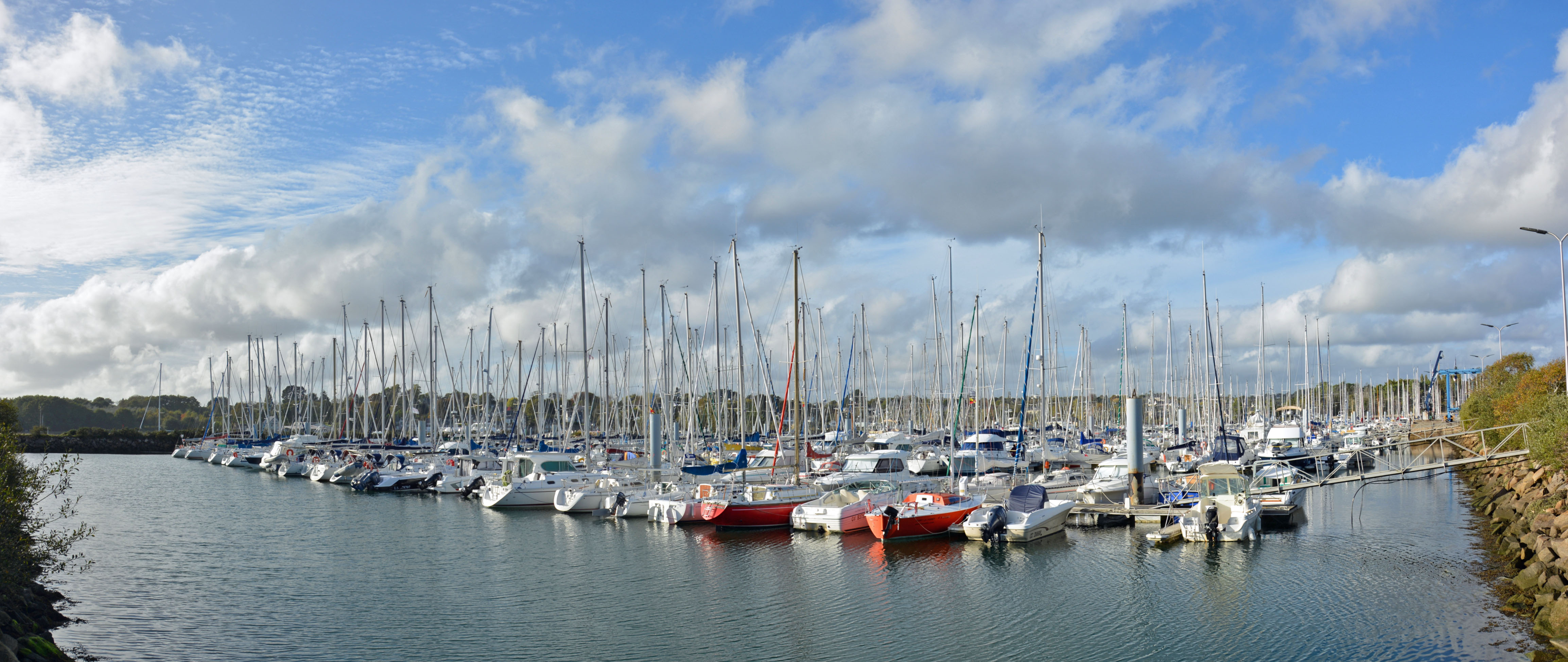
Port-la-Forêt

- Communes of the Finistère department
