= Pleuven =

Pleuven Pluwenn
- Commune
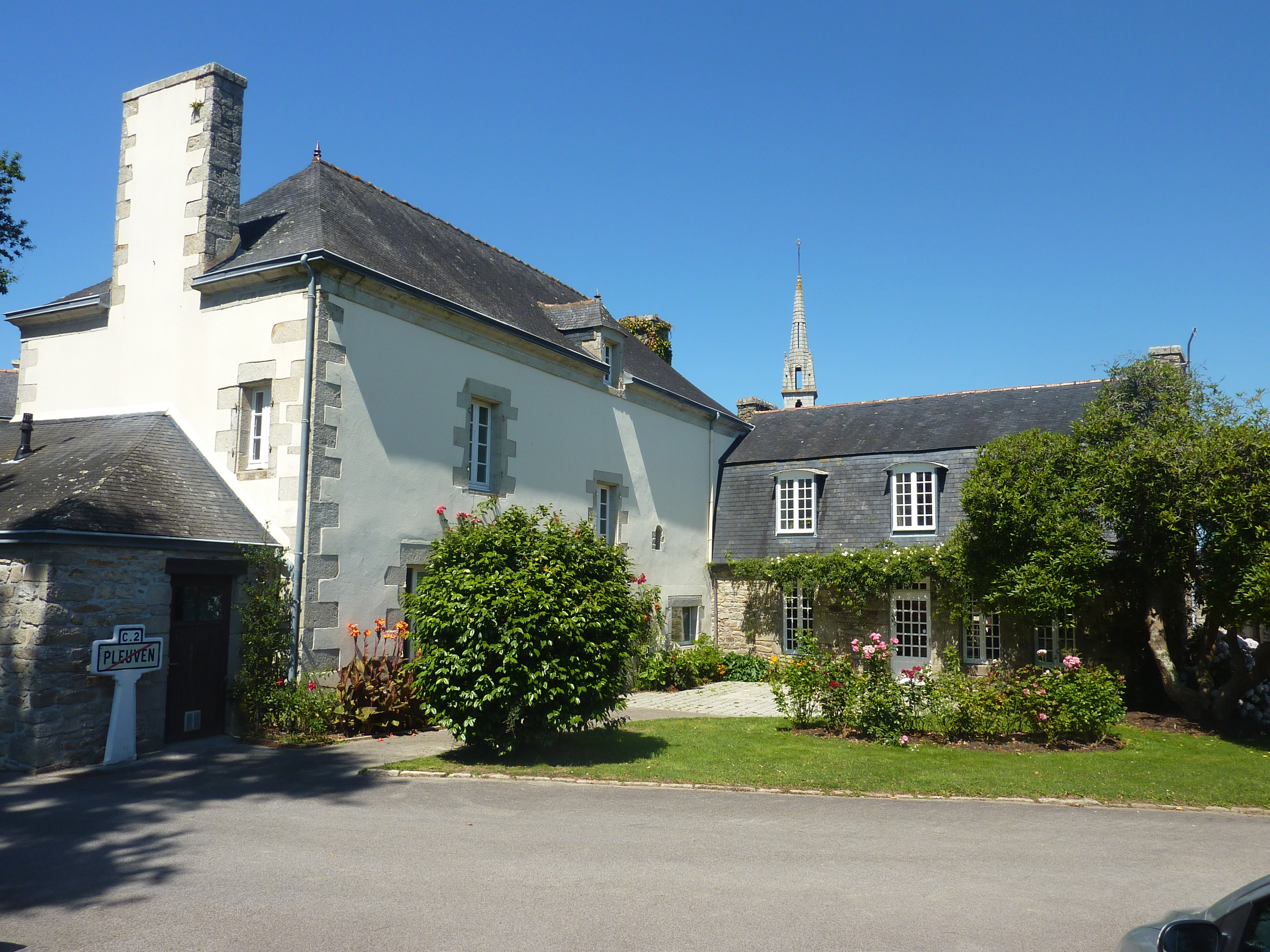
- The town hall in Pleuven

- Coat of arms
- Location of Pleuven
- Location within France Location within Brittany
- Coordinates: 47°54′24″N 4°02′32″W
- Country: France
- Region: Brittany
- Department: Finistère
- Arrondissement: Quimper
- Canton: Fouesnant
- Intercommunality: Pays Fouesnantais

Government
  - Mayor (2020–2026): David Del Nero
- Area^{1}: 13.69 km^{2} (5.29 sq mi)
- Highest elevation: 77 m (253 ft)
- Lowest elevation: 2 m (6.6 ft)
- Population (2023): 3,311
  - Density: 241.9/km^{2} (626.4/sq mi)
- Time zone: UTC+01:00 (CET)
  - Summer (DST): UTC+02:00 (CEST)
- INSEE/Postal code: 29161 /29170
- ^{1} French Land Register data, which excludes lakes, ponds, glaciers > 1 km^{2} (0.386 sq mi or 247 acres) and river estuaries.

Pleuven (French pronunciation: [pløvɛn]; Breton: Pluwenn) is a commune in the Finistère department of Brittany in north-western France.

== Population ==
Inhabitants of Pleuven are called Pleuvennois in French.

Historical population
Year	Pop.	±% p.a.
1968	1,107	—
1975	1,332	+2.68%
1982	1,690	+3.46%
1990	1,993	+2.08%
1999	2,356	+1.88%
2007	2,632	+1.39%
2012	2,679	+0.35%
2017	2,987	+2.20%
2023	3,311	+1.73%
Source: INSEE

== See also ==
- Communes of the Finistère department
