= MDM Bank =

Former Russian bank (2009–2016)

- Company type: OJSC
- Industry: Finance and insurance
- Founded: 2009
- Defunct: 2017
- Fate: Merged
- Successor: URSA Bank then B&N Bank
- Headquarters: Novosibirsk, Russia
- Products: Financial services
- Number of employees: 5,000 (2017)

MDM Bank (Russian: МДМ Банк), is a former Russian commercial bank that operated from 1993 until it was merged in 2017 with B&N Bank.

Former MDM-Bank was one of Russia's largest private banks originally based in Moscow. In 2009 it merged with URSA, was renamed and moved to the city of Novosibirsk. MDM and URSA estimated that the new MDM Bank would have capital of US$2.5 billion and total assets of US$18.7 billion, although in practice the numbers ended up being somewhat lower.

== History ==
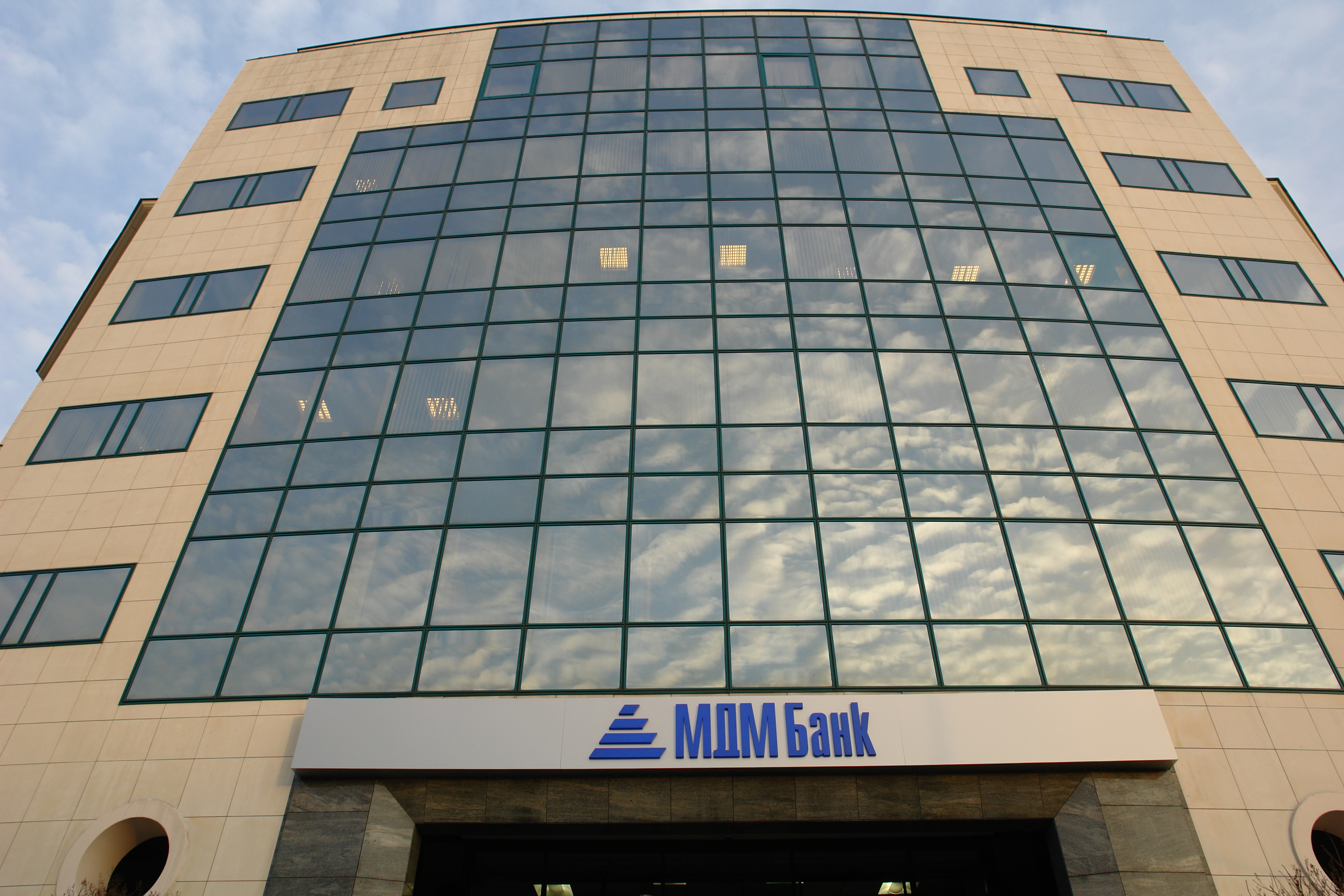
Former original MDM-Bank in Moscow, 1993-2009

The original MDM-Bank was founded in Moscow in December 1993 and held a General Banking License issued by the Central Bank of Russia (#2361 dated 13 February 2003, which was voided as the bank migrates under URSA Bank license #323).

Igor Kim, chairman and shareholder of URSA, became the new bank's chief executive officer during the transition period; Oleg Vyugin chaired the board of the bank's holding company and the former MDM CEO Igor Kuzin became chief executive of the holding company.

URSA Bank was founded in 1990 as Sibakadembank by the Siberian Division of the Russian Academy of Sciences. It was restructured from a privately held bank to a joint-stock bank in 1997. After a series of mergers with local Siberian banks, in 2006 Sibakadembank merged with Yekaterinburg-based Uralvneshtorgbank (established 1991) and assumed the new name, URSA Bank.

In 2016 MDM merged with another Russian lender, B&N Bank. This new entity now ranked in the top 10 of all Russian banks, and the top five for private lenders. In 2017 the newly merged entity required a bailout by the Russian Central Bank.
