= Scaër =

Scaër Skaer
- Commune
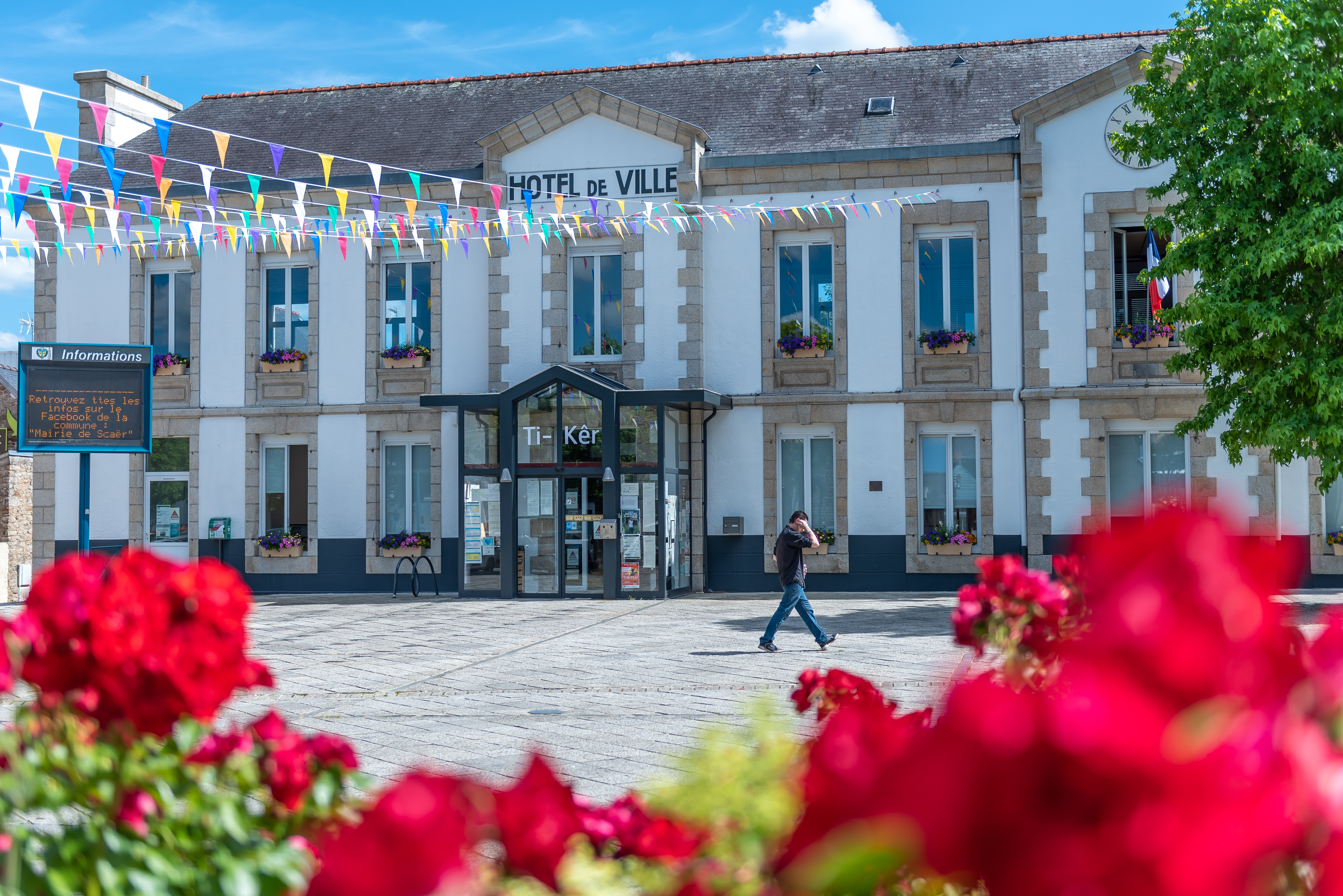
- Town hall

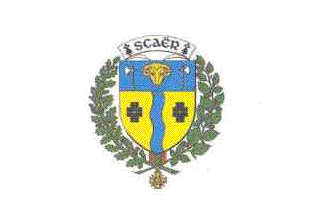
- Flag Coat of arms
- Location of Scaër
- Location within France Location within Brittany
- Coordinates: 48°01′41″N 3°42′03″W
- Country: France
- Region: Brittany
- Department: Finistère
- Arrondissement: Quimper
- Canton: Moëlan-sur-Mer
- Intercommunality: CA Quimperlé Communauté

Government
  - Mayor (2020–2026): Jean-Yves Le Goff
- Area^{1}: 117.58 km^{2} (45.40 sq mi)
- Highest elevation: 242 m (794 ft)
- Lowest elevation: 65 m (213 ft)
- Population (2023): 5,178
  - Density: 44.04/km^{2} (114.1/sq mi)
- Time zone: UTC+01:00 (CET)
  - Summer (DST): UTC+02:00 (CEST)
- INSEE/Postal code: 29274 /29390
- ^{1} French Land Register data, which excludes lakes, ponds, glaciers > 1 km^{2} (0.386 sq mi or 247 acres) and river estuaries.

Scaër (French pronunciation: [skɛʁ]; Breton: Skaer) is a commune in the Finistère department of Brittany in north-western France.

== Population ==
Inhabitants of Scaër are called in French Scaërois. Scaër's population peaked at 7,838 in 1946 and has since declined to 5,178 in 2023. This represents a 34% decrease in total population since the peak census figure.

Historical population

Year	Pop.	±% p.a.
1793	4,035	—
1800	4,567	+1.79%
1806	3,598	−3.90%
1821	3,460	−0.26%
1831	3,676	+0.61%
1836	3,937	+1.38%
1841	4,005	+0.34%
1846	4,156	+0.74%
1851	4,304	+0.70%
1856	4,343	+0.18%
1861	4,278	−0.30%
1866	4,471	+0.89%
1872	4,394	−0.29%
1876	4,747	+1.95%
1881	4,891	+0.60%
1886	5,403	+2.01%
1891	5,686	+1.03%
1896	5,939	+0.87%
1901	6,243	+1.00%

Year	Pop.	±% p.a.
1906	6,565	+1.01%
1911	6,676	+0.34%
1921	6,581	−0.14%
1926	6,697	+0.35%
1931	7,118	+1.23%
1936	7,402	+0.79%
1946	7,838	+0.57%
1954	7,204	−1.05%
1962	7,176	−0.05%
1968	6,999	−0.42%
1975	6,556	−0.93%
1982	5,968	−1.33%
1990	5,555	−0.89%
1999	5,267	−0.59%
2007	5,139	−0.31%
2012	5,358	+0.84%
2017	5,380	+0.08%
2023	5,178	−0.64%

Source: EHESS and INSEE (1968–2023)

== Geography ==
Scaër, encompassing 11,758 hectares, is the most spread-out city in Finistère and the third in Brittany. Scaër is located 30.5 km (19.0 mi) east of Quimper and 40 km (25 mi) northwest of Lorient. Historically, Scaër belongs to Cornouaille.

=== Neighbouring communes ===
Scaër is border by Guiscriff to the east, by Leuhan and Roudouallec to the north, by Tourc'h to the west and by Rosporden and Bannalec to the south.

== Breton language ==
The municipality launched a linguistic plan concerning the Breton language through Ya d'ar brezhoneg on 20 March 2007.

In 2008, 11.62% of primary-school children attended bilingual schools.

== See also ==
- The Cavalcade of Scaër
- Communes of the Finistère department
