= Concarneau Cornouaille Agglomération =

- Communauté d'agglomération
- Interactive map of Concarneau Cornouaille Agglomération
- Coordinates: 47°55′N 03°50′W
- Country: France
- Region: Brittany
- Department: Finistère
- No. of communes: {{{nbcomm}}}
- Established: 2012
- Area: 371.3 km^{2} (143.4 sq mi)
- Population (2019): 50,975
  - Density: 137.3/km^{2} (355.6/sq mi)
- Website: www.cca.bzh

Concarneau Cornouaille Agglomération (Breton: Aglomeradur Kernev-Kerne) is the communauté d'agglomération, an intercommunal structure, centred on the town of Concarneau. It is located in the Finistère department, in the Brittany region, northwestern France. Created in 2012, its seat is in Concarneau. Its area is 371.3 km^{2}. Its population was 50,975 in 2019, of which 19,816 in Concarneau proper.

== Composition ==
The communauté d'agglomération consists of the following 9 communes:

1. Concarneau
2. Elliant
3. Melgven
4. Névez
5. Pont-Aven
6. Rosporden
7. Saint-Yvi
8. Tourch
9. Trégunc
