= Melgven =

Melgven Mêlwenn
- Commune
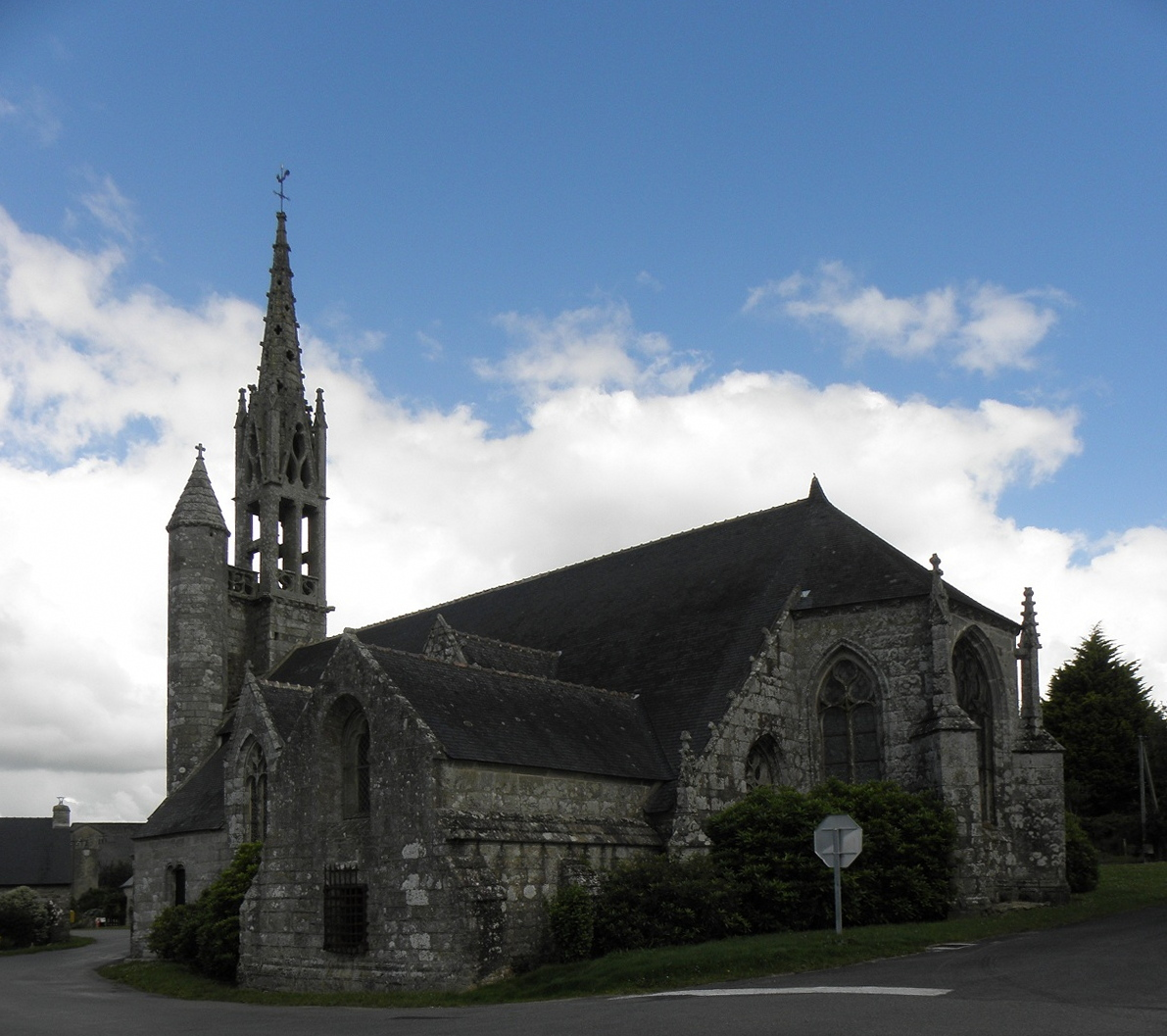
- The chapel of La Trinité, in Melgven
- Location of Melgven
- Location within France Location within Brittany
- Coordinates: 47°54′24″N 3°50′05″W
- Country: France
- Region: Brittany
- Department: Finistère
- Arrondissement: Quimper
- Canton: Concarneau
- Intercommunality: Concarneau Cornouaille Agglomération

Government
  - Mayor (2020–2026): Catherine Esvant
- Area^{1}: 51.17 km^{2} (19.76 sq mi)
- Highest elevation: 155 m (509 ft)
- Lowest elevation: 1 m (3.3 ft)
- Population (2023): 3,371
  - Density: 65.88/km^{2} (170.6/sq mi)
- Time zone: UTC+01:00 (CET)
  - Summer (DST): UTC+02:00 (CEST)
- INSEE/Postal code: 29146 /29140
- ^{1} French Land Register data, which excludes lakes, ponds, glaciers > 1 km^{2} (0.386 sq mi or 247 acres) and river estuaries.

Melgven (French pronunciation: [mɛlvɛ̃]; Breton: Mêlwenn) is a commune in the Finistère department of Brittany in northwestern France.

== Geography ==
=== Climate ===
Melgven has an oceanic climate (Köppen climate classification Cfb). The average annual temperature in Melgven is 11.9 °C (53.4 °F). The average annual rainfall is 1,132.0 mm (44.57 in) with December as the wettest month. The temperatures are highest on average in July, at around 18.1 °C (64.6 °F), and lowest in January, at around 6.5 °C (43.7 °F). The highest temperature ever recorded in Melgven was 39.2 °C (102.6 °F) on 9 August 2003; the coldest temperature ever recorded was −11.0 °C (12.2 °F) on 17 January 1985.

Climate data for Melgven (1981–2010 averages, extremes 1982−2017)
Month	Jan	Feb	Mar	Apr	May	Jun	Jul	Aug	Sep	Oct	Nov	Dec	Year
Record high °C (°F)	15.5 (59.9)	19.0 (66.2)	24.0 (75.2)	26.8 (80.2)	30.5 (86.9)	34.6 (94.3)	36.5 (97.7)	39.2 (102.6)	31.6 (88.9)	29.5 (85.1)	19.8 (67.6)	17.0 (62.6)	39.2 (102.6)
Mean daily maximum °C (°F)	9.4 (48.9)	10.0 (50.0)	12.5 (54.5)	14.7 (58.5)	18.2 (64.8)	21.4 (70.5)	23.4 (74.1)	23.5 (74.3)	21.2 (70.2)	16.9 (62.4)	12.7 (54.9)	10.0 (50.0)	16.2 (61.2)
Daily mean °C (°F)	6.5 (43.7)	6.6 (43.9)	8.5 (47.3)	10.1 (50.2)	13.4 (56.1)	16.2 (61.2)	18.1 (64.6)	18.1 (64.6)	16.0 (60.8)	12.9 (55.2)	9.2 (48.6)	7.0 (44.6)	11.9 (53.4)
Mean daily minimum °C (°F)	3.6 (38.5)	3.2 (37.8)	4.5 (40.1)	5.5 (41.9)	8.6 (47.5)	11.0 (51.8)	12.8 (55.0)	12.6 (54.7)	10.8 (51.4)	8.9 (48.0)	5.7 (42.3)	4.0 (39.2)	7.6 (45.7)
Record low °C (°F)	−11.0 (12.2)	−10.0 (14.0)	−8.0 (17.6)	−4.2 (24.4)	−1.4 (29.5)	2.2 (36.0)	4.0 (39.2)	4.0 (39.2)	3.0 (37.4)	−2.5 (27.5)	−4.8 (23.4)	−7.2 (19.0)	−11.0 (12.2)
Average precipitation mm (inches)	129.9 (5.11)	100.9 (3.97)	89.9 (3.54)	78.2 (3.08)	83.4 (3.28)	55.4 (2.18)	63.0 (2.48)	64.0 (2.52)	80.2 (3.16)	121.4 (4.78)	128.4 (5.06)	137.4 (5.41)	1,132 (44.57)
Average precipitation days (≥ 1.0 mm)	16.0	12.8	13.0	12.2	11.1	8.2	9.6	8.6	9.5	14.9	15.2	15.7	146.8
Source: Meteociel

== Population ==
Inhabitants of Melgven are called Melgvinois in French.

Historical population

Year	Pop.	±% p.a.
1793	2,133	—
1800	2,239	+0.70%
1806	1,759	−3.94%
1821	2,009	+0.89%
1831	2,029	+0.10%
1836	2,190	+1.54%
1841	2,195	+0.05%
1846	2,274	+0.71%
1851	2,296	+0.19%
1856	2,241	−0.48%
1861	2,327	+0.76%
1866	2,378	+0.43%
1872	2,448	+0.48%
1876	2,632	+1.83%
1881	2,803	+1.27%
1886	2,874	+0.50%
1891	2,950	+0.52%
1896	2,928	−0.15%
1901	2,933	+0.03%

Year	Pop.	±% p.a.
1906	2,949	+0.11%
1911	2,858	−0.62%
1921	2,834	−0.08%
1926	2,879	+0.32%
1931	3,023	+0.98%
1936	2,986	−0.25%
1946	3,018	+0.11%
1954	2,886	−0.56%
1962	2,849	−0.16%
1968	3,072	+1.26%
1975	2,403	−3.45%
1982	2,809	+2.26%
1990	2,987	+0.77%
1999	2,947	−0.15%
2007	3,215	+1.09%
2012	3,404	+1.15%
2017	3,356	−0.28%
2023	3,371	+0.07%

Source: EHESS and INSEE (1968-2023)

== Sights ==
- A gothic church from the 14th century at the center of the village
- Chapelle de Bonne Nouvelle dedicated to notre Dame de Bonne Nouvelle
- Chapelle de la Trinité built at the 16th century by the atelier de Saint Herbot

== Gallery ==
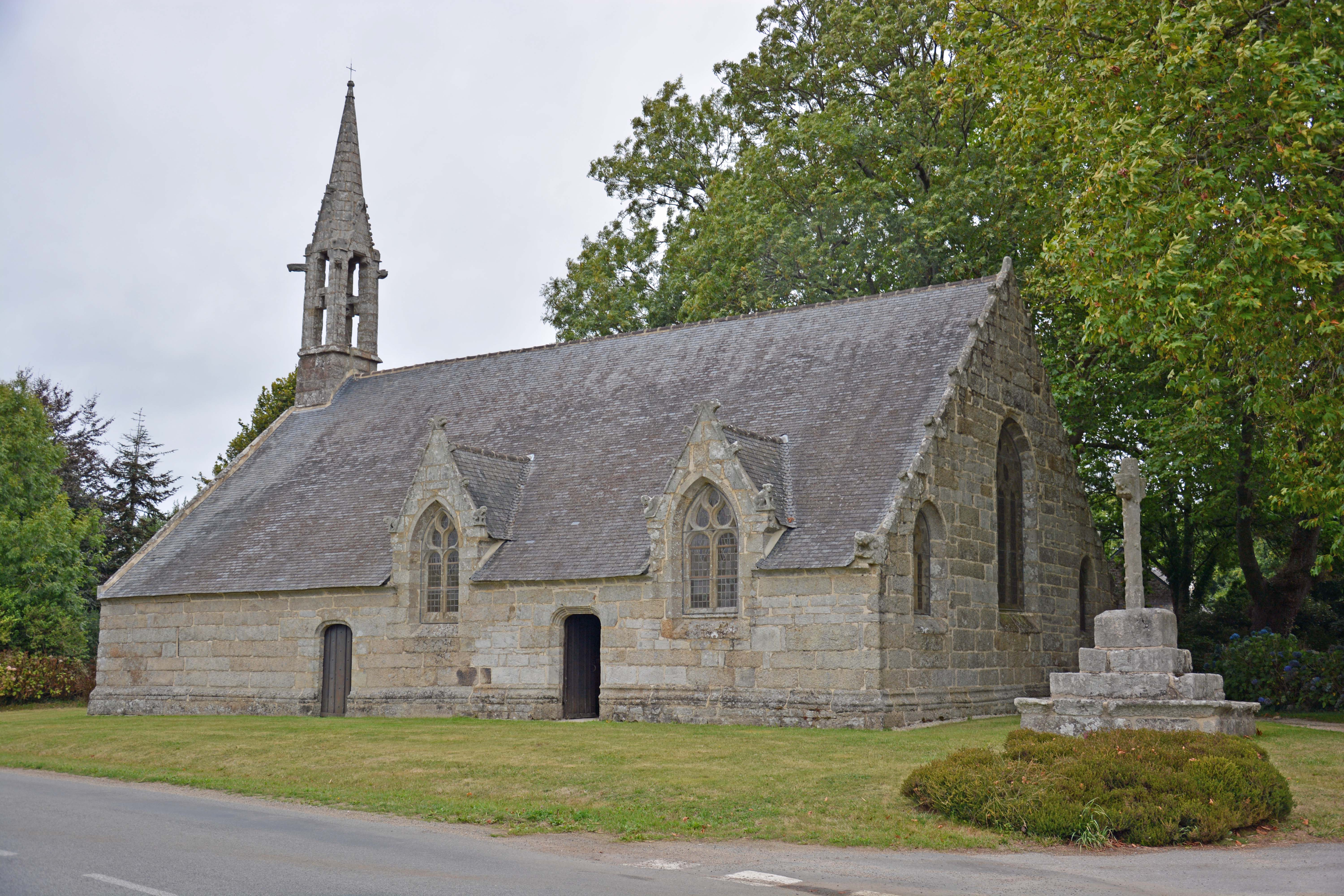
Chapelle Notre-Dame de Coat-an-Poudou

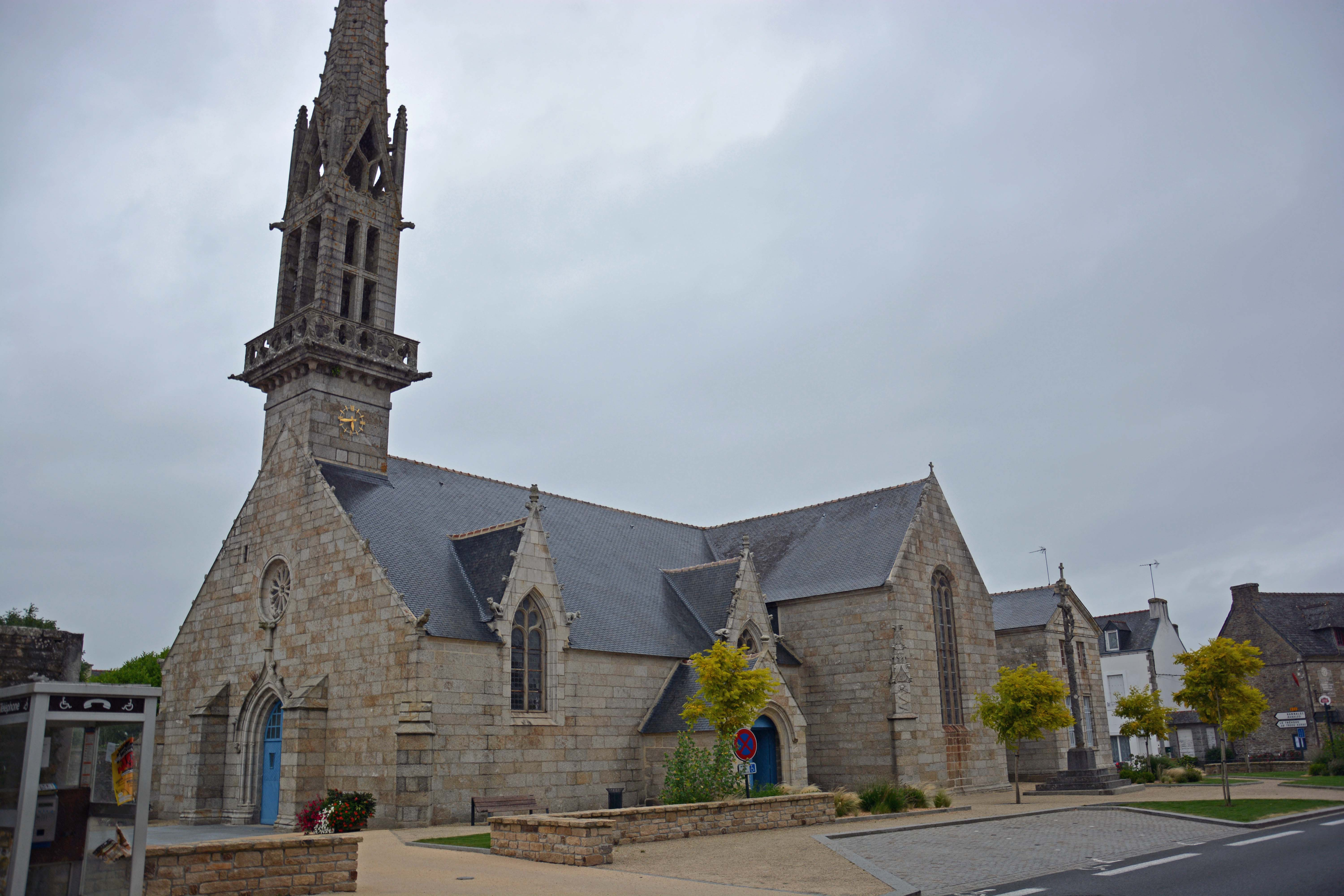
Église Saint-Pierre-et-Saint-Paul (Melgven)

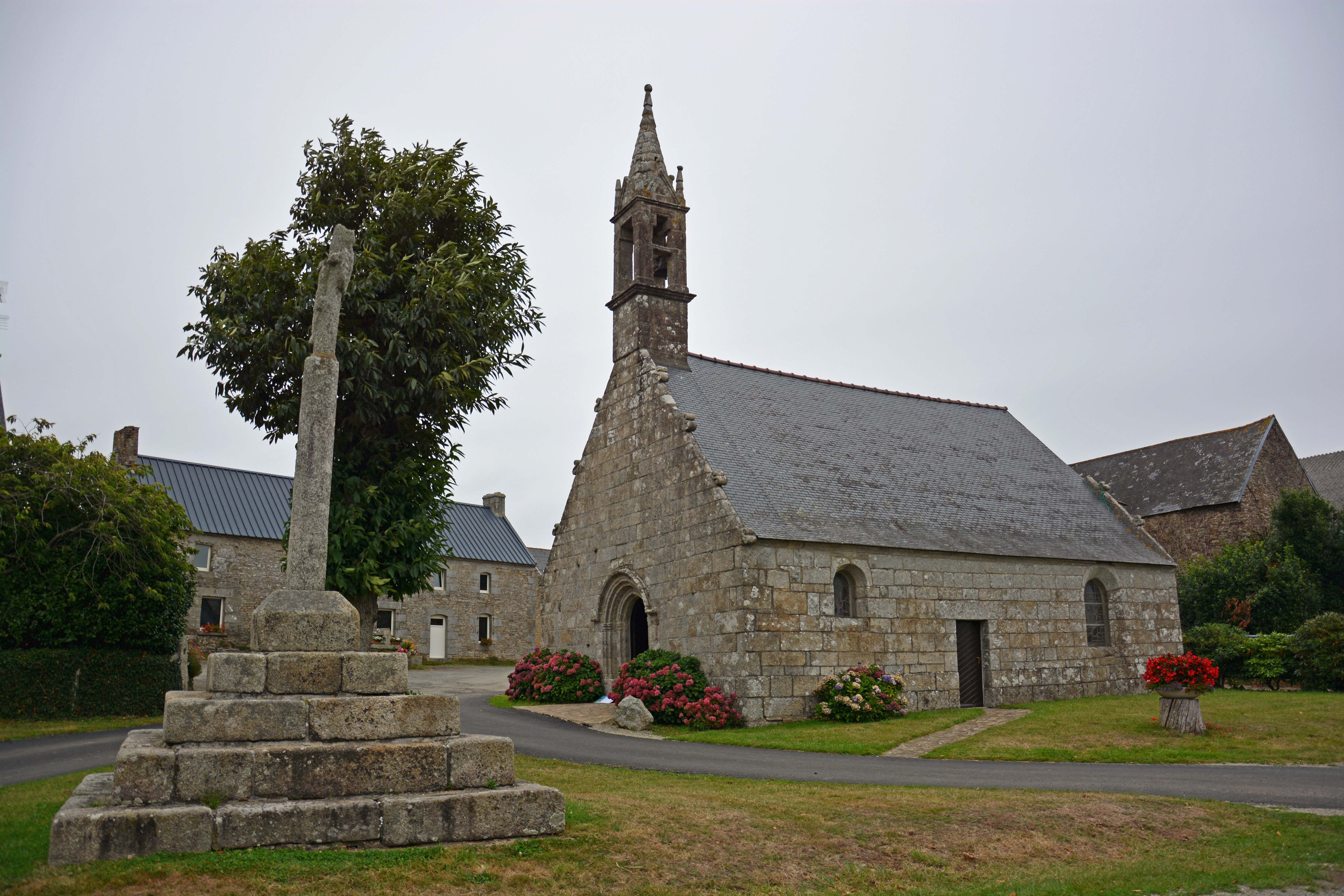
Chapelle Saint-Antoine (Melgven)

== See also ==
- Communes of the Finistère department
