= Saint-Yvi =

Saint-Yvi Sant-Ivi
- Commune
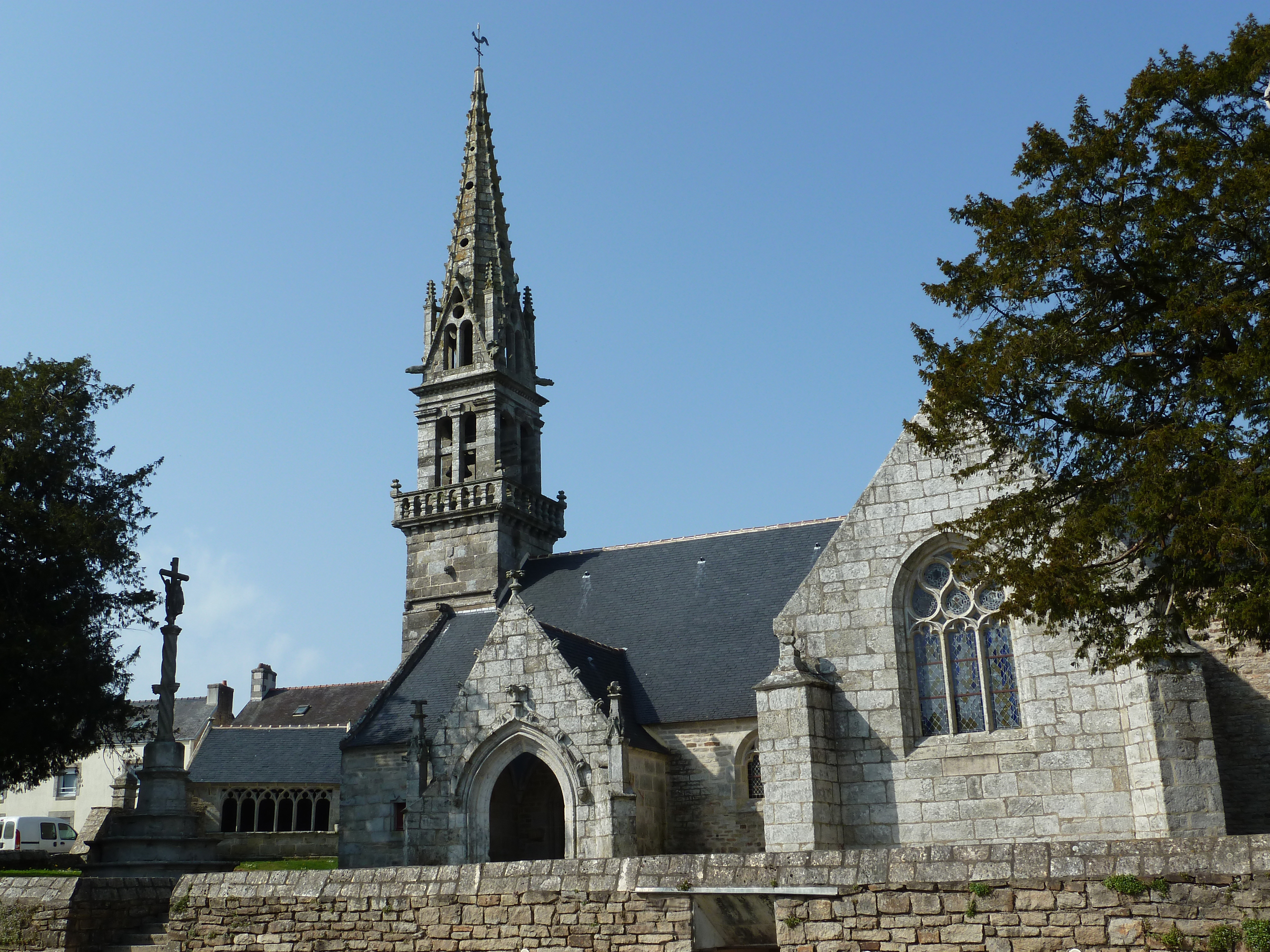
- The church of Our Lady, in Saint-Yvi
- Location of Saint-Yvi
- Location within France Location within Brittany
- Coordinates: 47°58′05″N 3°56′01″W
- Country: France
- Region: Brittany
- Department: Finistère
- Arrondissement: Quimper
- Canton: Concarneau
- Intercommunality: Concarneau Cornouaille Agglomération

Government
  - Mayor (2020–2026): Guy Pagnard
- Area^{1}: 27.05 km^{2} (10.44 sq mi)
- Highest elevation: 161 m (528 ft)
- Lowest elevation: 26 m (85 ft)
- Population (2023): 3,431
  - Density: 126.8/km^{2} (328.5/sq mi)
- Time zone: UTC+01:00 (CET)
  - Summer (DST): UTC+02:00 (CEST)
- INSEE/Postal code: 29272 /29140
- Website: www.saint-yvi.bzh
- ^{1} French Land Register data, which excludes lakes, ponds, glaciers > 1 km^{2} (0.386 sq mi or 247 acres) and river estuaries.

Saint-Yvi (French pronunciation: [sɛ̃.t‿ivi]; before September 2005: Saint-Yvy, Breton: Sant-Ivi) is a commune in the Finistère department of Brittany in north-western France.

== Population ==
Inhabitants of Saint-Yvi are called in French Saint-Yviens. The population has been increasing quickly since the year 1975.

Historical population

Year	Pop.	±% p.a.
1793	780	—
1800	910	+2.23%
1806	964	+0.97%
1821	1,209	+1.52%
1831	1,169	−0.34%
1836	1,166	−0.05%
1841	1,168	+0.03%
1846	1,264	+1.59%
1851	1,260	−0.06%
1856	1,290	+0.47%
1861	1,213	−1.22%
1866	1,350	+2.16%
1872	1,269	−1.03%
1876	1,383	+2.17%
1881	1,482	+1.39%
1886	1,558	+1.01%
1891	1,531	−0.35%
1896	1,628	+1.24%
1901	1,618	−0.12%

Year	Pop.	±% p.a.
1906	1,714	+1.16%
1911	1,724	+0.12%
1921	1,673	−0.30%
1926	1,626	−0.57%
1931	1,509	−1.48%
1936	1,539	+0.39%
1946	1,400	−0.94%
1954	1,306	−0.87%
1962	1,258	−0.47%
1968	1,242	−0.21%
1975	1,493	+2.66%
1982	2,176	+5.53%
1990	2,386	+1.16%
1999	2,393	+0.03%
2007	2,733	+1.67%
2012	2,877	+1.03%
2017	3,155	+1.86%
2023	3,431	+1.41%

Source: EHESS and INSEE (1968–2023)

== Geography ==
Saint-Yvi is located 13 km (8.1 mi) east of Quimper. Historically, the town belongs to Cornouaille. The river Jet forms its northern border.

== Map ==
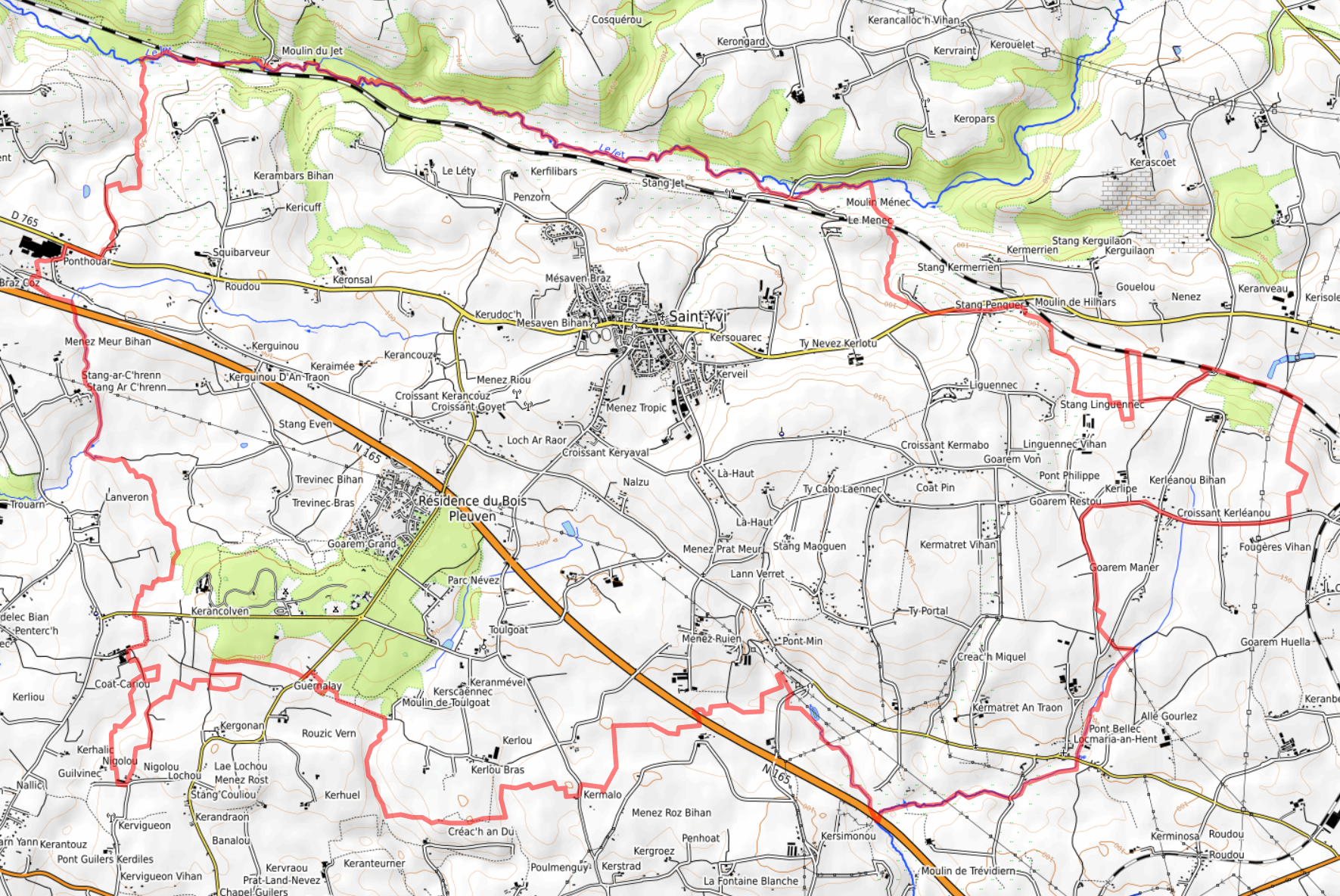
Topographic map

== See also ==
- Communes of the Finistère department
