= Elliant =

Elliant Eliant
- Commune
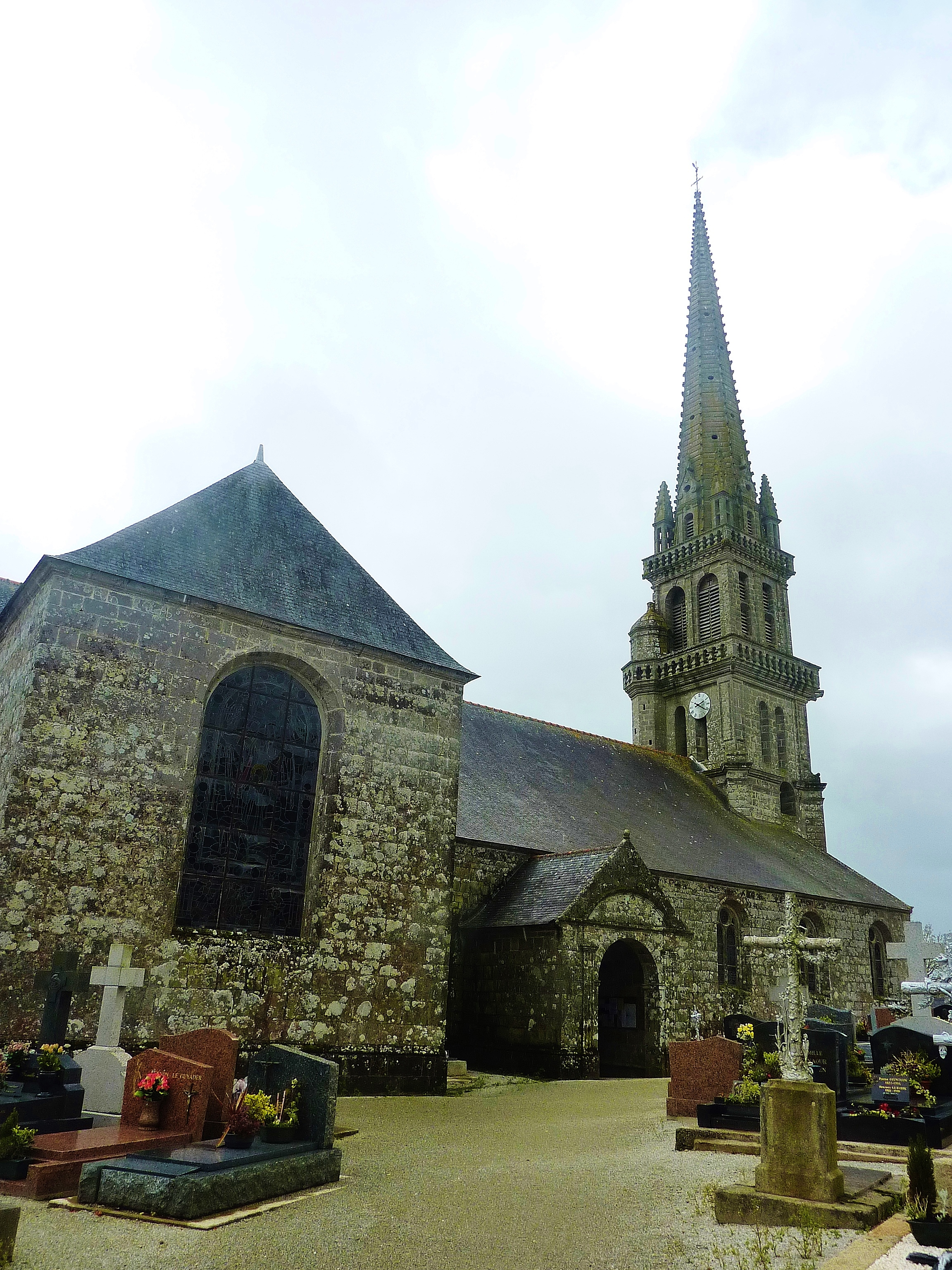
- The church of Saint-Gilles, in Elliant

- Coat of arms
- Location of Elliant
- Location within France Location within Brittany
- Coordinates: 47°59′44″N 3°53′19″W
- Country: France
- Region: Brittany
- Department: Finistère
- Arrondissement: Quimper
- Canton: Concarneau
- Intercommunality: Concarneau Cornouaille Agglomération

Government
  - Mayor (2020–2026): René Le Baron
- Area^{1}: 70.30 km^{2} (27.14 sq mi)
- Highest elevation: 187 m (614 ft)
- Lowest elevation: 31 m (102 ft)
- Population (2023): 3,427
  - Density: 48.75/km^{2} (126.3/sq mi)
- Time zone: UTC+01:00 (CET)
  - Summer (DST): UTC+02:00 (CEST)
- INSEE/Postal code: 29049 /29370
- ^{1} French Land Register data, which excludes lakes, ponds, glaciers > 1 km^{2} (0.386 sq mi or 247 acres) and river estuaries.

Elliant (French pronunciation: [ɛljɑ̃]; Breton: Eliant) is a commune in the Finistère department and administrative region of Brittany in north-western France. It lies 16 km (9.9 mi) west of Quimper.

== Population ==
In French the inhabitants of Elliant are known as Elliantais.

Historical population

Year	Pop.	±% p.a.
1793	3,192	—
1800	2,359	−4.23%
1806	2,458	+0.69%
1821	2,512	+0.14%
1831	2,789	+1.05%
1836	2,918	+0.91%
1841	2,922	+0.03%
1846	2,870	−0.36%
1851	2,849	−0.15%
1856	2,882	+0.23%
1861	2,952	+0.48%
1866	2,984	+0.22%
1872	3,087	+0.57%
1876	3,400	+2.44%
1881	3,651	+1.43%
1886	3,815	+0.88%
1891	3,950	+0.70%
1896	3,788	−0.83%
1901	3,966	+0.92%

Year	Pop.	±% p.a.
1906	3,993	+0.14%
1911	4,029	+0.18%
1921	4,017	−0.03%
1926	3,744	−1.40%
1931	3,467	−1.53%
1936	3,277	−1.12%
1946	3,038	−0.75%
1954	2,829	−0.89%
1962	2,642	−0.85%
1968	2,401	−1.58%
1975	2,295	−0.64%
1982	2,463	+1.01%
1990	2,591	+0.64%
1999	2,714	+0.52%
2007	3,127	+1.79%
2012	3,202	+0.48%
2017	3,271	+0.43%
2023	3,427	+0.78%

Source: EHESS and INSEE (1968-2023)

== See also ==
- Communes of the Finistère department
