= The Cavalcade of Scaër =

Cavalcade of Scaër Cavalcade de Scaër
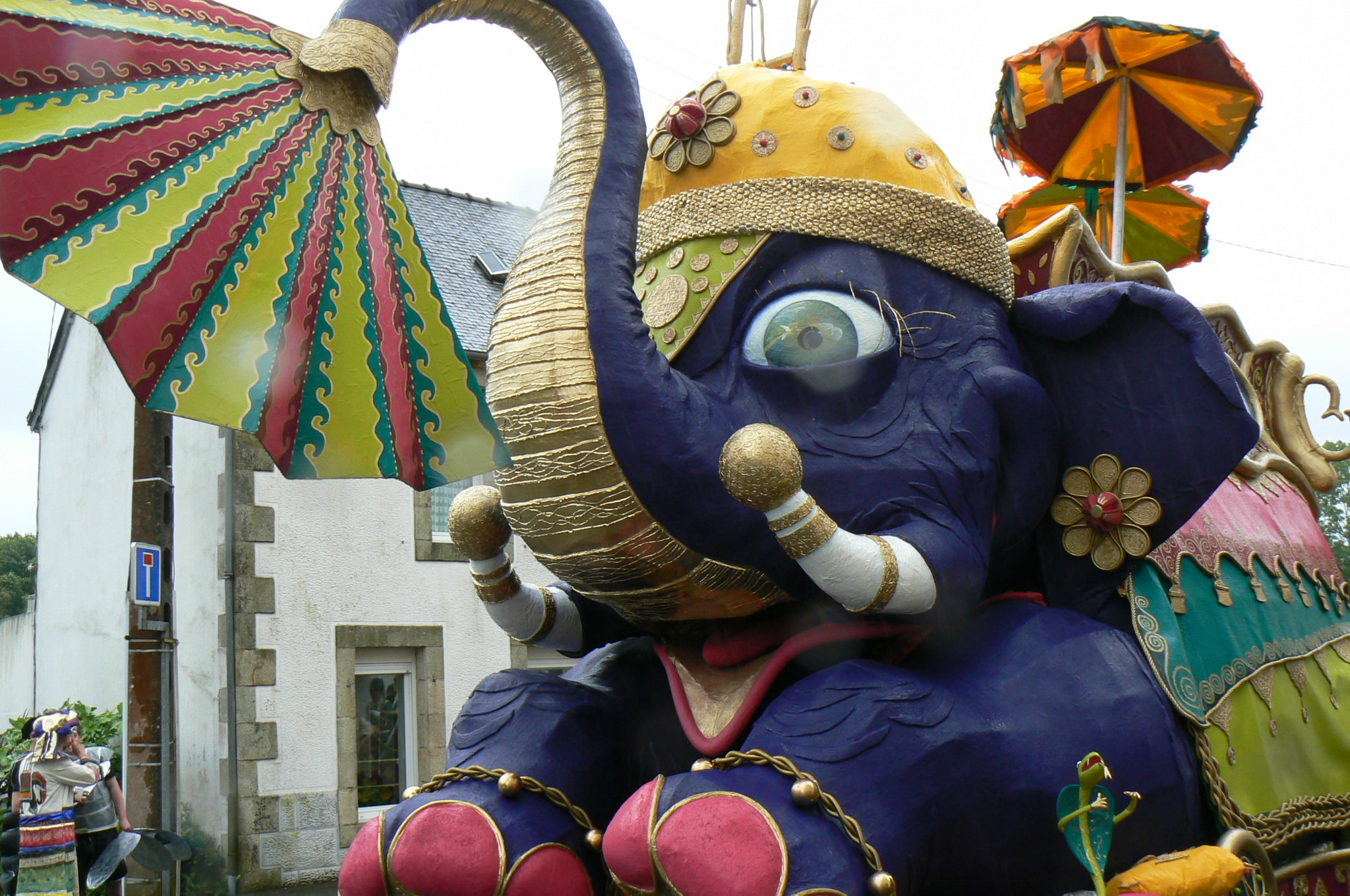
- A float during The Cavalcade in 2007
- Status: Active
- Genre: Carnival
- Begins: 24 May 2014
- Ends: 25 May 2014
- Frequency: Annually
- Location: Scaër
- Coordinates: 48.0281°N 3.7008°W
- Country: France
- Years active: 98
- Inaugurated: May 1923
- Most recent: 19 May 2013 – 20 May 2013
- Attendance: 50,000
- Website: link

The Cavalcade of Scaër (French: La Cavalcade de Scaër; or The Cavalcade) is a carnival festival that takes place in the town of Scaër, a commune in the Finistère department of Brittany in northwestern France. Every odd year since 1923, during the Pentecost weekend (Sunday and Monday), about 5,000 inhabitants of Scaër welcome about 50,000 spectators for The Cavalcade carnival, which the town owes its nickname French: "Scaër la Joyeuse" ("Scaër the Merry").

== See also ==
- Cavalcade
- Float (parade)
- Parade
