= Tourch =

Tourch Tourc'h
- Commune
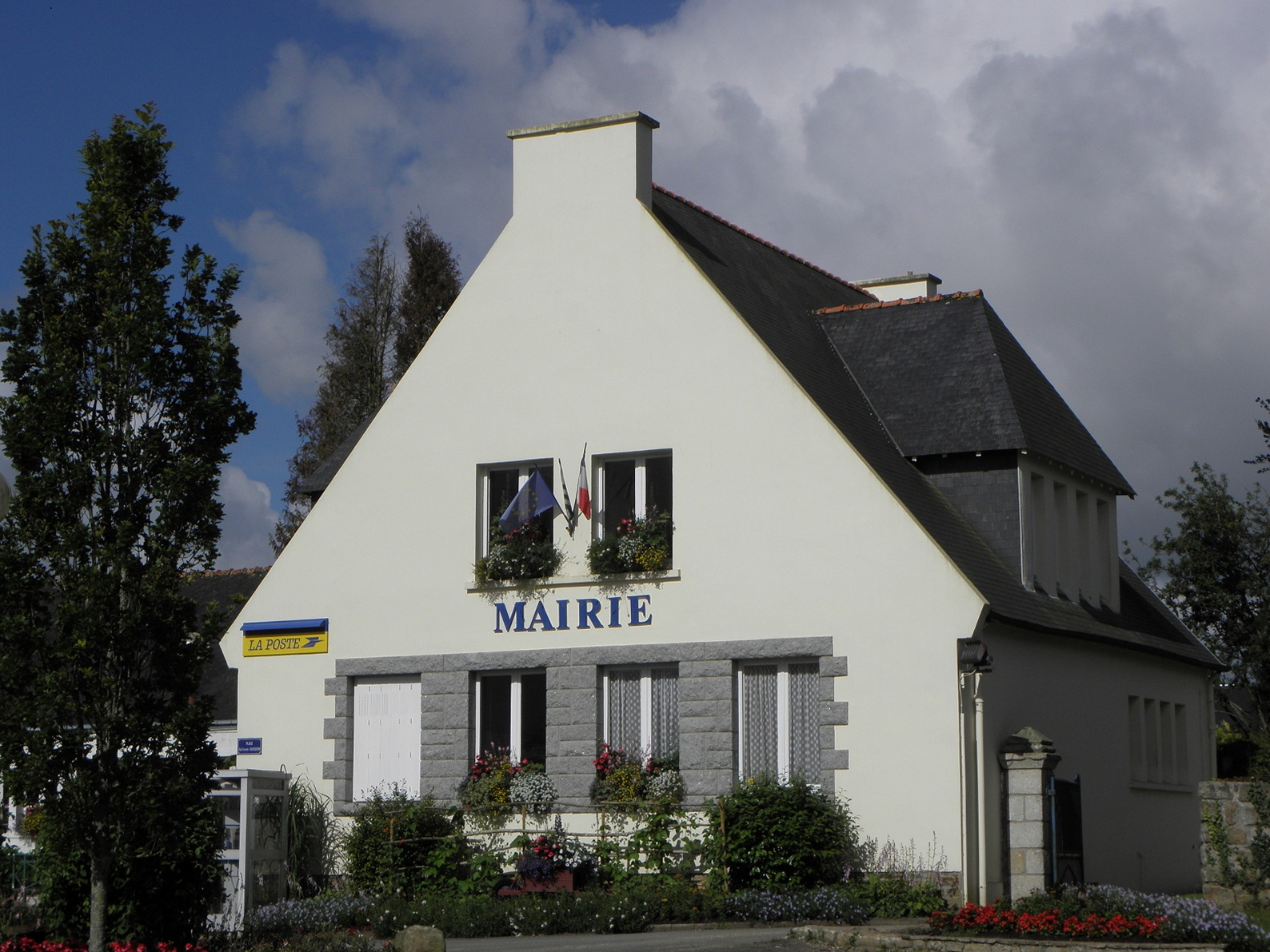
- The town hall in Tourch

- Coat of arms
- Location of Tourch
- Location within France Location within Brittany
- Coordinates: 48°01′31″N 3°49′28″W
- Country: France
- Region: Brittany
- Department: Finistère
- Arrondissement: Quimper
- Canton: Concarneau
- Intercommunality: Concarneau Cornouaille Agglomération

Government
  - Mayor (2020–2026): Michel Cotten
- Area^{1}: 19.70 km^{2} (7.61 sq mi)
- Highest elevation: 216 m (709 ft)
- Lowest elevation: 118 m (387 ft)
- Population (2023): 1,002
  - Density: 50.86/km^{2} (131.7/sq mi)
- Time zone: UTC+01:00 (CET)
  - Summer (DST): UTC+02:00 (CEST)
- INSEE/Postal code: 29281 /29140
- ^{1} French Land Register data, which excludes lakes, ponds, glaciers > 1 km^{2} (0.386 sq mi or 247 acres) and river estuaries.

Tourch (Breton: Tourc'h) is a commune in the Finistère department of Brittany in north-western France.

== Population ==
Inhabitants of Tourch are called in French Tourchois.

Historical population

Year	Pop.	±% p.a.
1793	584	—
1800	905	+6.46%
1806	600	−6.62%
1821	630	+0.33%
1831	758	+1.87%
1836	776	+0.47%
1841	760	−0.42%
1846	752	−0.21%
1851	727	−0.67%
1856	767	+1.08%
1861	825	+1.47%
1866	830	+0.12%
1872	862	+0.63%
1876	960	+2.73%
1881	994	+0.70%
1886	1,024	+0.60%
1891	1,034	+0.19%
1896	1,077	+0.82%
1901	1,132	+1.00%

Year	Pop.	±% p.a.
1906	1,167	+0.61%
1911	1,224	+0.96%
1921	1,206	−0.15%
1926	1,210	+0.07%
1931	1,185	−0.42%
1936	1,168	−0.29%
1946	1,174	+0.05%
1954	1,070	−1.15%
1962	1,029	−0.49%
1968	996	−0.54%
1975	935	−0.90%
1982	891	−0.69%
1990	820	−1.03%
1999	836	+0.21%
2007	905	+1.00%
2012	1,001	+2.04%
2017	1,026	+0.49%
2023	1,002	−0.39%

Source: EHESS and INSEE (1968-2023)

== See also ==
- Communes of the Finistère department
