= Rosporden =

Rosporden Rosporden
- Commune
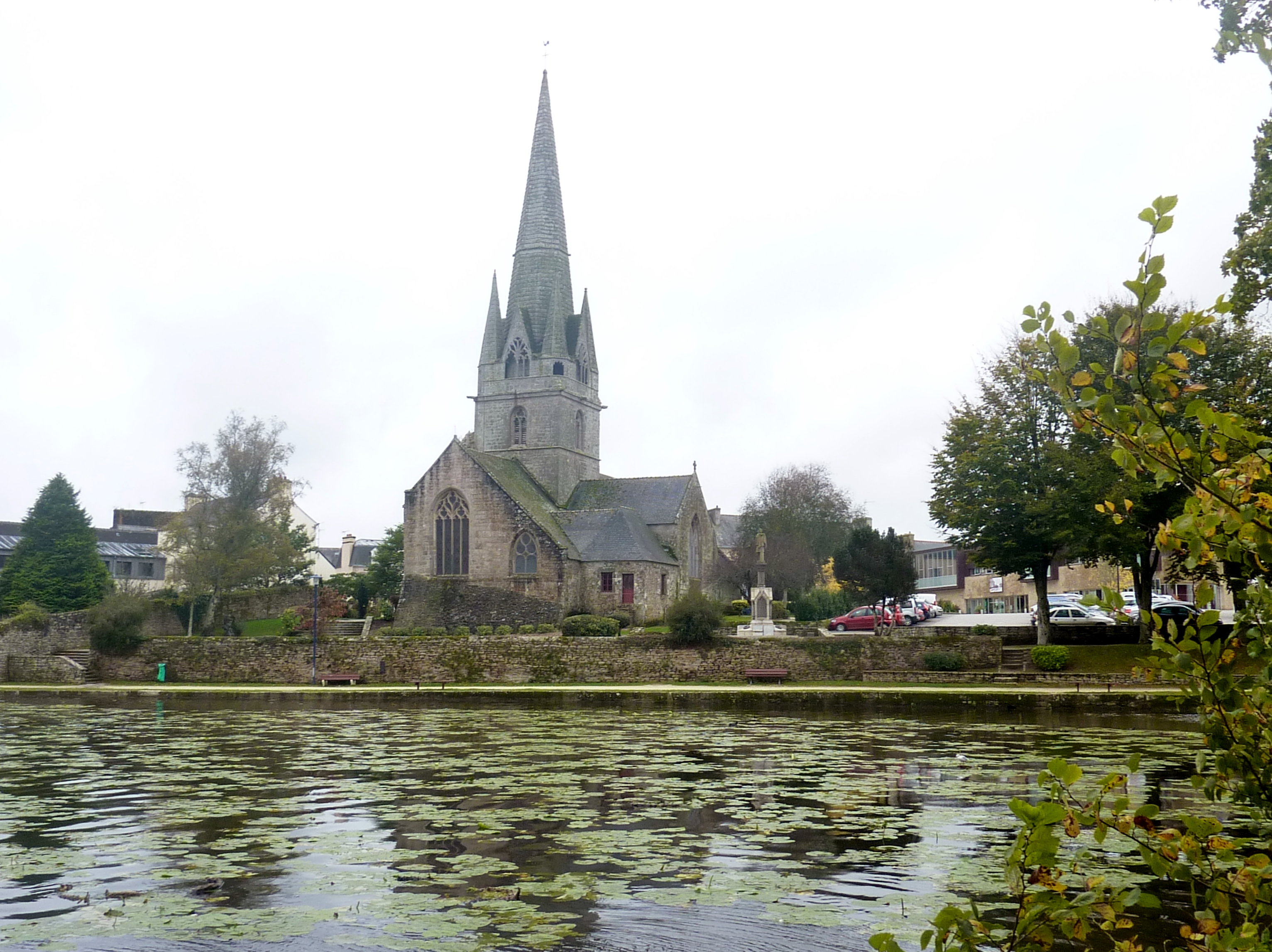
- Rosporden pond; parish church of Notre-Dame.

- Coat of arms
- Location of Rosporden
- Location within France Location within Brittany
- Coordinates: 47°57′41″N 3°50′01″W
- Country: France
- Region: Brittany
- Department: Finistère
- Arrondissement: Quimper
- Canton: Concarneau
- Intercommunality: Concarneau Cornouaille Agglomération

Government
  - Mayor (2020–2026): Michel Loussouarn
- Area^{1}: 57.37 km^{2} (22.15 sq mi)
- Highest elevation: 171 m (561 ft)
- Lowest elevation: 25 m (82 ft)
- Population (2023): 7,550
  - Density: 132/km^{2} (341/sq mi)
- Time zone: UTC+01:00 (CET)
  - Summer (DST): UTC+02:00 (CEST)
- INSEE/Postal code: 29241 /29140
- ^{1} French Land Register data, which excludes lakes, ponds, glaciers > 1 km^{2} (0.386 sq mi or 247 acres) and river estuaries.

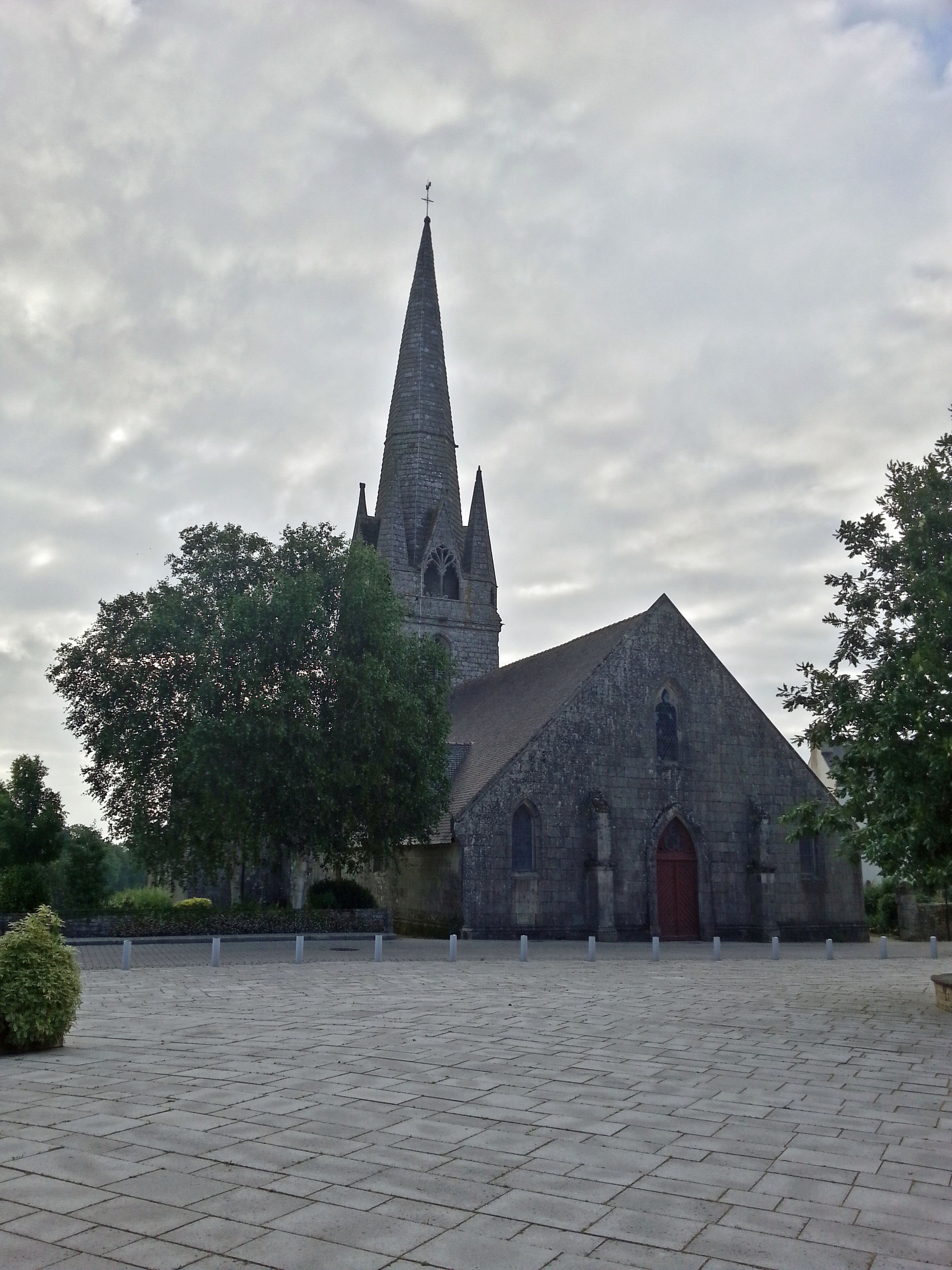
Church of Our Lady of Rosporden

Rosporden (French pronunciation: [ʁɔspɔʁdɛ̃]; Breton: Rosporden) is a commune in the Finistère department of Brittany in north-western France. Rosporden station has rail connections to Quimper, Lorient and Vannes.

The small city specializes in the manufacture of "chouchen", a version of mead native to Brittany, and is known as the Capital of Chouchen.

== Population ==
Inhabitants of Rosporden are called in French Rospordinois. In 1974 Rosporden absorbed the former commune of Kernével. The population data given in the table below for 1968 and earlier refer to the former commune of Rosporden, without Kernével.

Historical population

Year	Pop.	±% p.a.
1793	749	—
1800	765	+0.30%
1806	768	+0.07%
1821	867	+0.81%
1831	927	+0.67%
1836	1,006	+1.65%
1841	1,033	+0.53%
1846	1,048	+0.29%
1851	1,186	+2.50%
1856	1,229	+0.71%
1861	1,242	+0.21%
1866	1,284	+0.67%
1872	1,213	−0.94%
1876	1,325	+2.23%
1881	1,539	+3.04%
1886	1,742	+2.51%
1891	1,847	+1.18%
1896	2,069	+2.30%
1901	2,197	+1.21%

Year	Pop.	±% p.a.
1906	2,360	+1.44%
1911	2,450	+0.75%
1921	2,386	−0.26%
1926	2,438	+0.43%
1931	2,464	+0.21%
1936	2,594	+1.03%
1946	2,887	+1.08%
1954	2,876	−0.05%
1962	3,416	+2.17%
1968	3,378	−0.19%
1975	7,082	+11.15%
1982	6,735	−0.72%
1990	6,485	−0.47%
1999	6,441	−0.08%
2007	6,928	+0.92%
2012	7,435	+1.42%
2017	7,671	+0.63%
2023	7,550	−0.26%

Source: EHESS and INSEE (1968-2023)

== See also ==
- Communes of the Finistère department
