= Saint-Pol-de-Léon Cathedral =

Roman Catholic church in Finistère, Brittany, France

Coordinates: 48°41′6″N 3°59′11″W

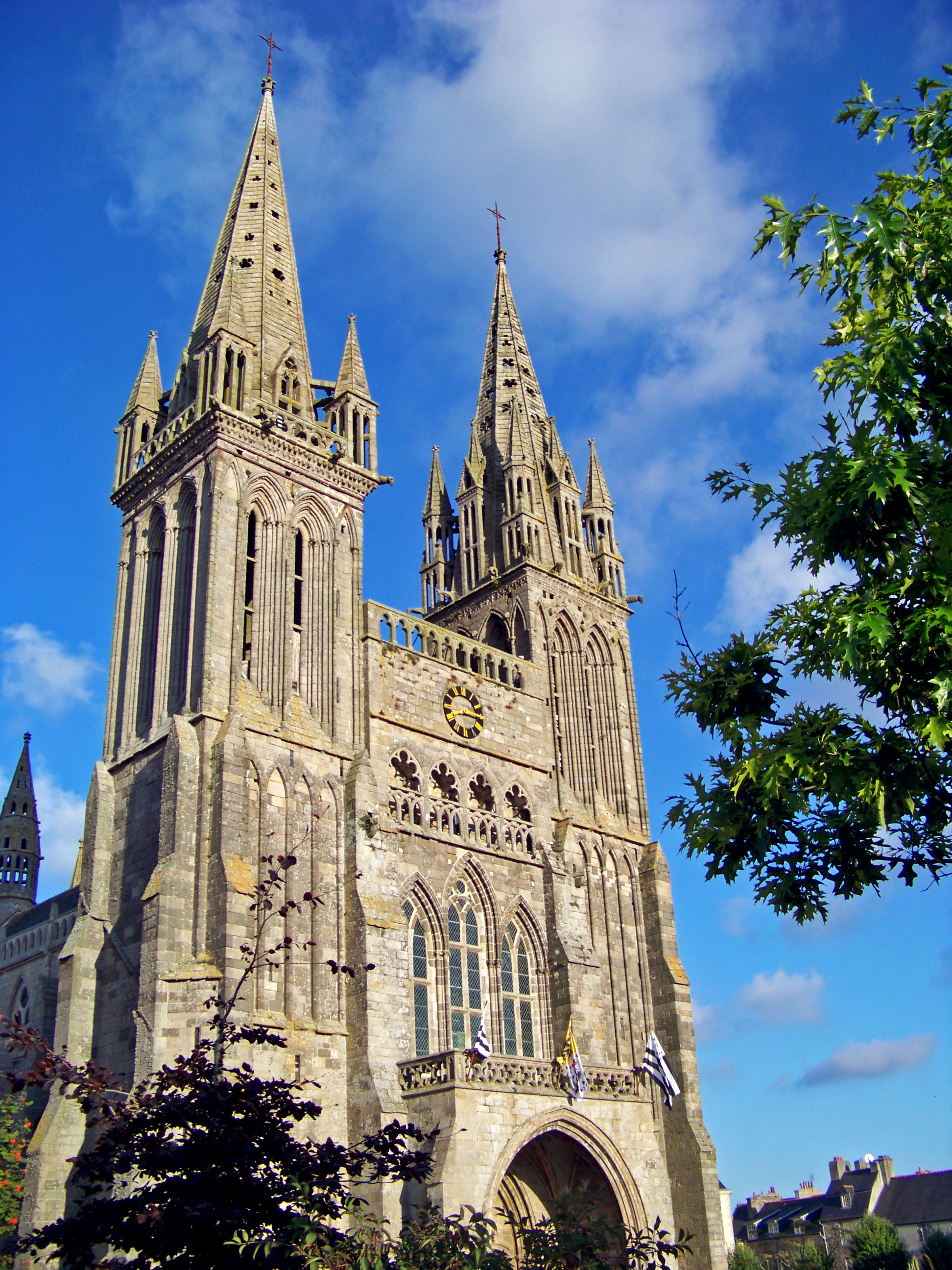
Saint-Pol Cathedral: west front

Saint Paul Aurelian Cathedral (Cathédrale Saint-Paul-Aurélien) is a basilica and former Roman Catholic cathedral in Saint-Pol-de-Léon, in the Finistère department in Brittany in north-western France. The 13th-century building stands on the site of an earlier church founded by Saint Paul Aurélien in the 6th century. It has been a protected monument historique since 1840.

== History ==
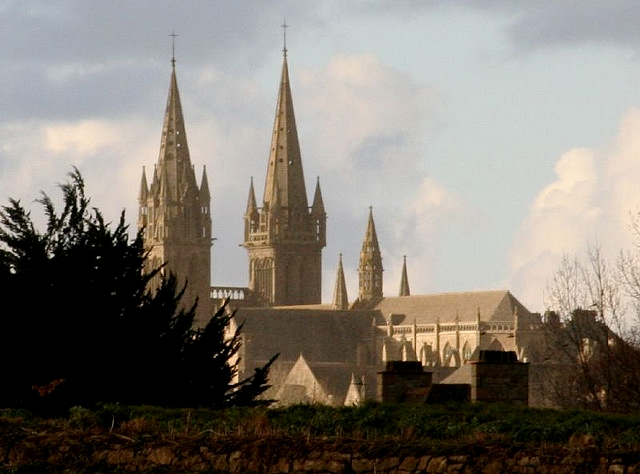
A view of Saint Paul Aurélien cathedral with its two towers

It was formerly the seat of the Bishop of Saint-Pol-de-Léon, a bishopric established in the 6th century but abolished under the Concordat of 1801, when its territory was transferred to the Diocese of Quimper.

It is dedicated to its 6th-century founder, the first bishop Saint Paul Aurelian. He was originally from Wales and is considered to have been the first bishop of the Léon area. We know something of Aurélien's life thanks to a manuscript written in 884 by a Landévennec monk. Paul Aurélien was born in Wales in around 490, and educated at the Saint Iltud school. He was ordained as a priest and in 525 left Wales for the continent with a dozen companions. He landed at the Ile d'Ouessant and preached along the north Finistère coast up to the Île de Batz. According to legend, he helped free the Île de Batz from a dragon which was terrorising the local population.

The cathedral replaced an earlier romanesque basilica founded by Bishop Haman and was built in various stages. The nave, west façade and the south porch date to the 13th century and the bishopric of Bishop Desilon, whilst the choir and transept date to the early 15th century. The building was completed in the second half of the 16th century.

Built on the site of an ancient Roman church, some vestiges of which still exist. This great monument has been constructed in several stages. The present building, however, although on the same site, was built in the 13th century (with later additions). The facade with its two high towers and the remarkable nave from the 13th century made of limestone from Caen demonstrate the stylistic and economical heritage from Normandy. The western façade and the south porch date back from the 13th century whereas the chancel (choir made of granite) and the transept are from the beginning of the 15th century. The cathedral was completed in the second half of the 16th century (the ambulatory and the southern chapel). It also has an ensemble which is almost unique in Brittany.

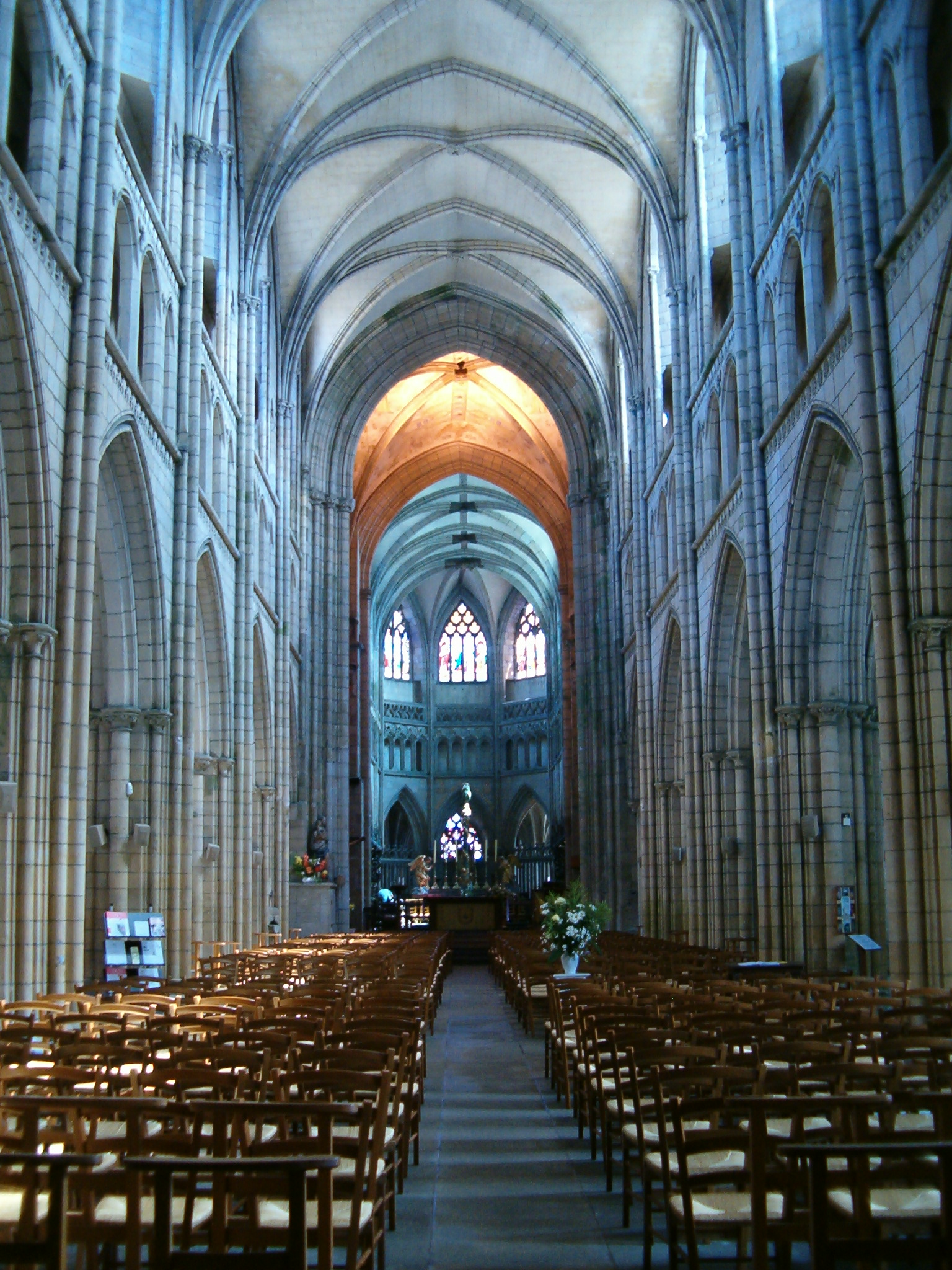
The nave looking towards the apse

The 50-metre spires are from the end of the 14th century. In the 16th century, side chapels gave it its definitive stature. The cathedral is 80 metres long in total, 16-metre height under the vaults and 44 metres wide with the transepts.

In the north tower, there are three bells which date from more than three centuries ago, including the oldest bourden bell in Brittany, which weighs more than 2 tonnes, and was cast in 1563.

The cathedral represented the seven parishes of Minihy-Léon which in 1698 were the Crucifix de la ville, Notre-Dame de Cahel, Saint-Jean de la ville or Saint-Jean-Baptiste, Toussaints, Saint-Pierre, Crucifix des Champs and Saint-Jean l'Evangéliste or Trégondern. Amongst the many altars in the cathedral are altars dedicated to each of these parishes. In 1901 the cathedral was designated the "Basilique Mineure de l'Annonciation".

== Exterior ==
The cathedral façade is dominated by two polygonal unsymmetrical towers with a height nearing 50 metres. Above the central door is a terrace which enabled the bishop to address a crowd and give blessings and under the right-hand tower is a small door used in the Middle Ages as an entrance for lepers.

=== South portal ===
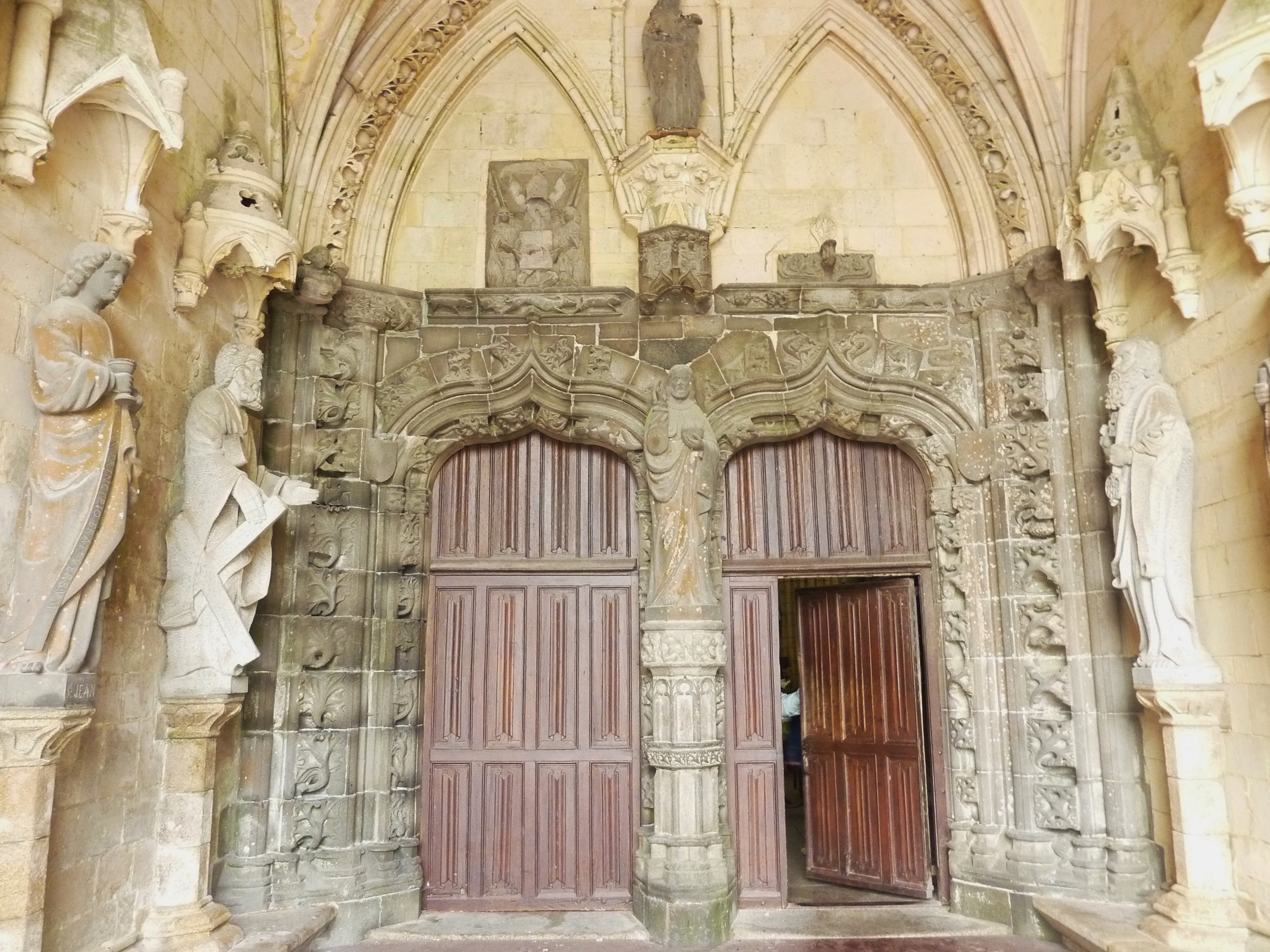
The south porch with a statue of Christ giving a blessing in the trumeau

The south porch is decorated with statues of John the Evangelist and St Simon carved by the Yves Hernot workshop in the 19th century on one side and St Andrew and St Peter carved by Guy Pavec in 1980 on the other. It leads to double doors which give access to the cathedral. In the trumeau between the two doors is a statue of Christ giving a blessing and in the tympanum over the doors is a statue of the Virgin Mary, Between the two doors leading into the cathedral there is also a stoup with the coat of arms of the Lomérals of Plounéventer. On the left are the arms of Monseigneur Ferron and on the right the Validire arms. Monseigneur Validire was the Bishop of Léon from 1427 to 1432.

=== The west porch ===
The west porch has statues of Saint Thomas, Saint Pol and Saint Paul.

== Interior ==
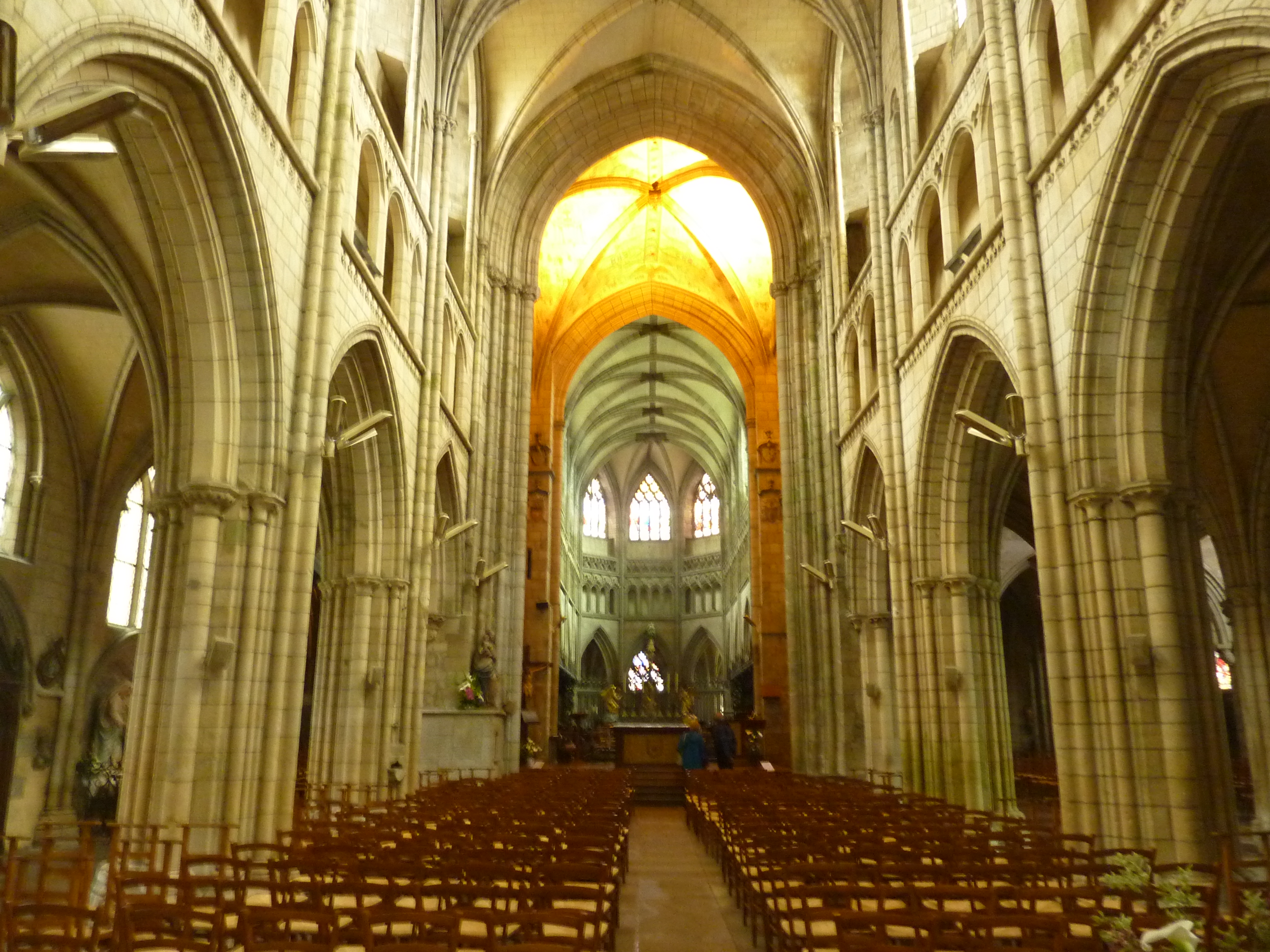
View of the cathedral nave, the choir in the distance

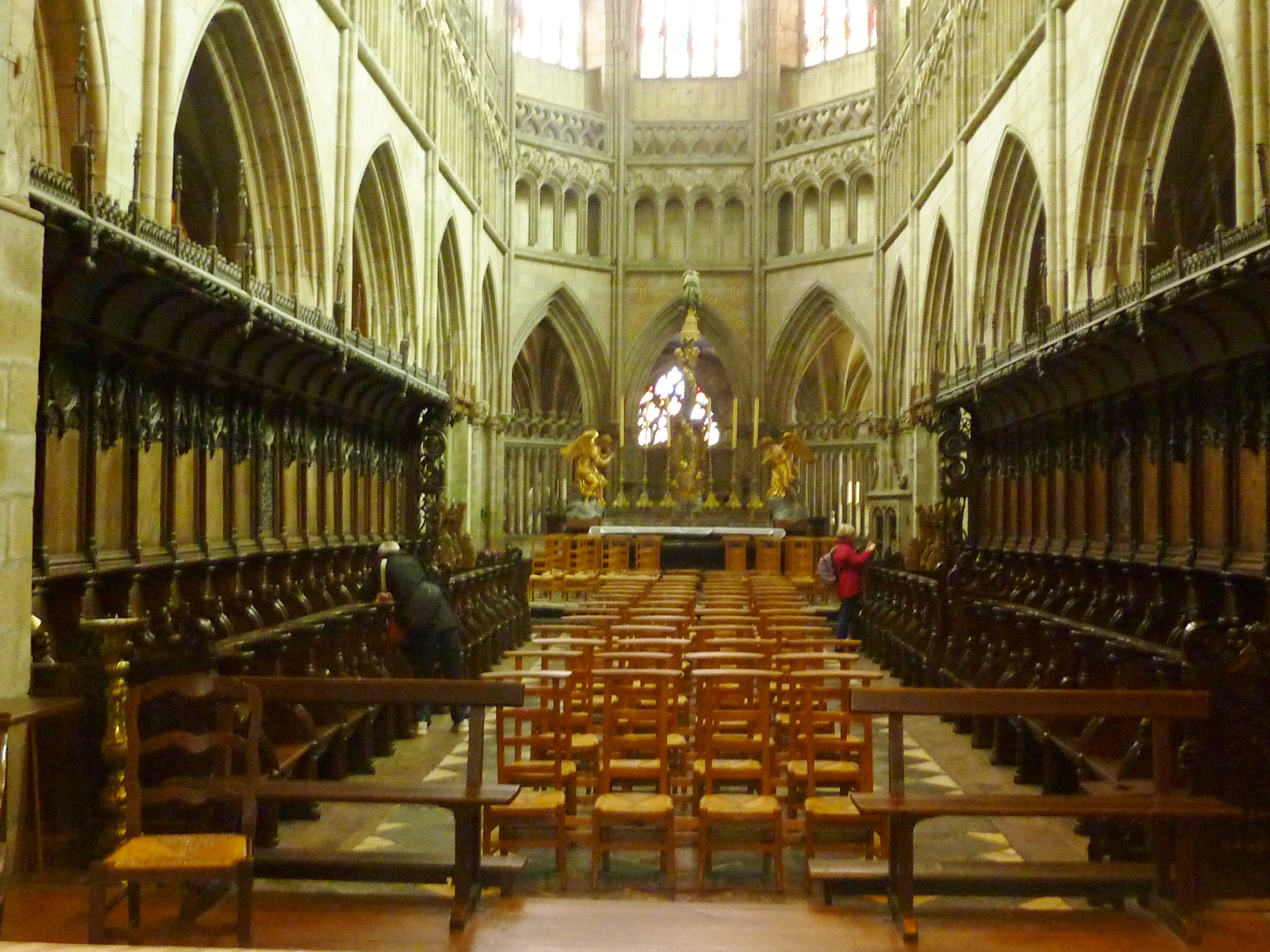
View of the cathedral choir with the oak stalls on either side of the approach to the main altar

Near the south portal and inside the cathedral are two stoups. The stoup on the right bears the arms of Monseigneur Robert Cupif (1639-1646). That on the left is decorated with carvings of frogs, lizards and eels. Also in this area is a sarcophagus thought to date back to the 11th century and believed by some historians to be the grave of Conan Meriadoc, the legendary first Christian king of Brittany. This sarcophagus is 2.34 metres in length and is decorated with many carvings including that of a tree without leaves, a traditional image of death.

=== Floor plan ===
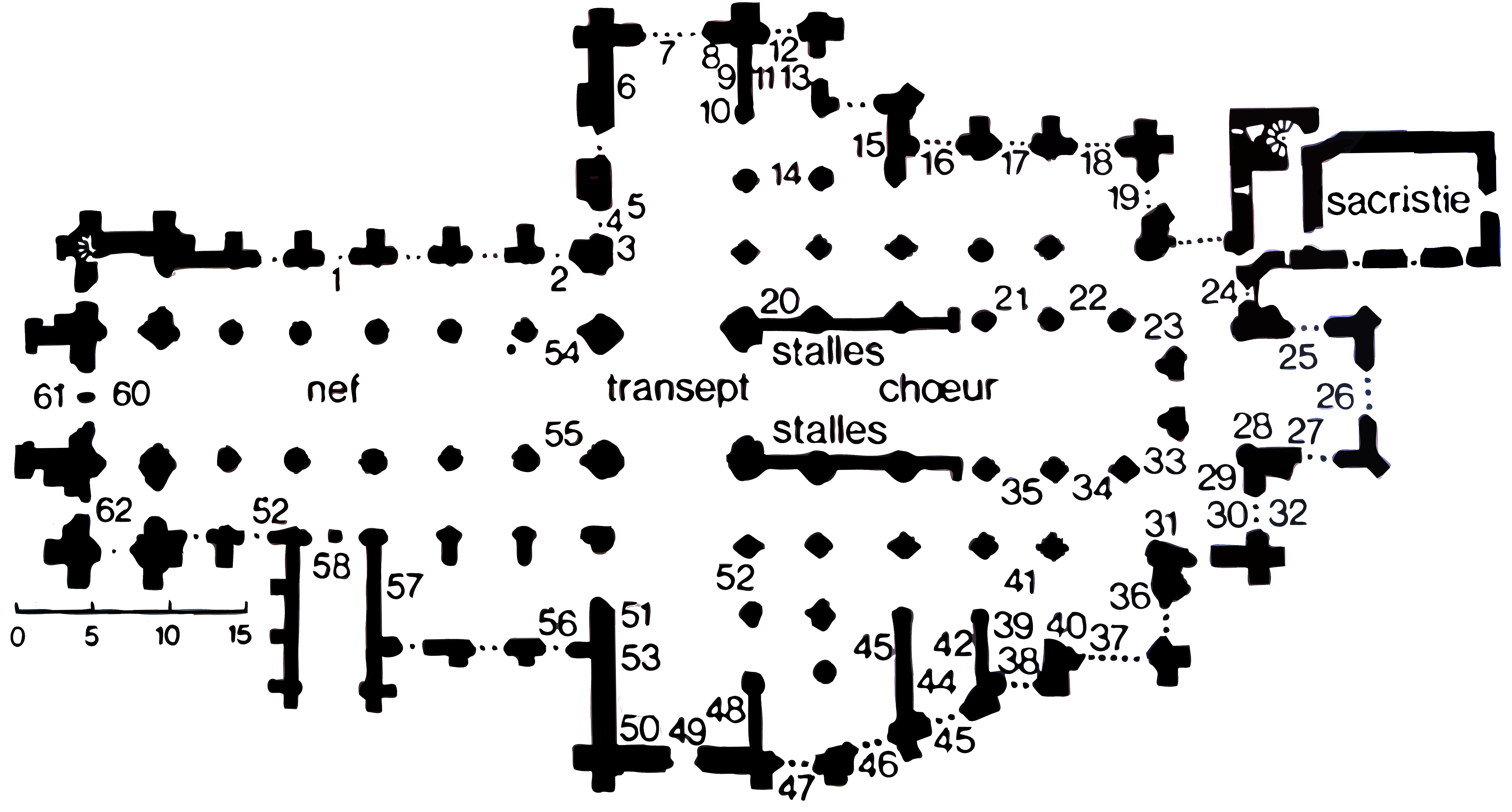
A plan of the interior of the Cathédrale Saint-Paul-Aurélien. 1. Last Judgement window. 2. Holy Family sculpture. 3. A 17th-century wooden statue of Saint Joseph. 4. A modern sculpture of Notre-Dame de Lourdes. 5. A 20th-century marble statue of Sainte Thérèse. 6. 17th-century wooden statue of a saint. 7. A 15th-century crucifix in wood. 7. "Apparition du Sacré-Cœur" a 19th-century stained glass window. 8,9 and 10. Altar with statues of Saint Herbot (in terracotta), Saint Éloi and Notre-Dame des Sept-Douleurs and an altarpiece with bas-reliefs " le Songe de saint Pol et Pêcheur découvrant la cloche miraculeuse". 11. A 19th-century sculpture depicting the "Annunciation". 11. Last Judgement fresco. 12. The altar "Autel à la sirène". 13. The "Autel de l'Icône" by A. Bizard, 14. Various tombstones including that of Marie-Amice Picard dating to 1652. 15. The altar "Autel des reliques". 16 to 18. Legend of St Pol windows. 19. A 17th-century altar and altarpiece with painting depicting Saint Pol de Léon and statues of John the Baptist, Sainte Claire, Sainte Thérèse, Saint Peter and John the Evangelist. 20. "Les Étagères de la nuit". A collection of skull boxes. 21. The tomb of Monseigneur de Guébriand. 22. The 1651 tomb of Monseigneur de Rieux-Sourdéac. 23. The 1869 tomb of Monseigneur Jean-François de la Marche by L. Cugnot. 24. 19th-century limestone statue "Notre-Dame de Bon-Secours". 24. "La pêche miraculeuse" a stained glass window based on a Raphaël drawing. 25. A painting "Présentation de la règle des Minimes par Saint François de Paule" and plaque commemorating Monseigneur de Léseuleuc. 26. A stained glass window depicting the Nativity, the Presentation in the temple, the Last Supper and the Resurrection. Also the "Autel des Apôtres. 27. Plaque commemorating Monseigneur Jean Gilles de Coetlosquet and a Lobin stained glass window devoted to Saint Joseph. 28. Tomb of the Richard brothers, 29. 17th-century wooden statues of Saint Appolline. 30. A bronze statue of Saint Peter, a replica of a statue in the Vatican and a wooden statue of Sainte Marguerite. 31. A 17th-century wooden statue of Saint Matthieu. 32. An 1883 stained glass window dedicated to Monseigneur de Neufville. 33. The tomb of Monseigneur de Visdelou by N. de la Colonge. 34. Tomb of Monseigneur Roland de Neufville. 35. Tomb of Monseigneur Guillaume de Kersauzon. 36. The Notre-Dame du Mont-Carmel altarpiece with statues of the Guardian Angel and Saint Michael. 37. The "Résurrection de Lazare" a stained glass window by Gaudin. 38. A stained glass window by F.Hucher depicting Jesus with some children. 39. A 1758 painting by L'Hermitais depicting Saint Pol fighting the dragon. 40. A 17th-century painting "La mort du Juste". 41. A 16th-century fresco of three masks symbolizing the Trinity. 42. Wooden altarpiece dedicated to Sainte Anne with a statue of Sainte Anne and statuettes of Saint Vincent de Paul and Saint François. 43. Stained glass window depicting the life of Saint Joseph. 44. A 17th-century painting "Education de la Vierge". 45. An altar and altarpiece with painting of Saint Roch and statues of Saint Roch and Saint Sébastien. 46. Stained glass window depicting "Le jugement des damnés". 47. A stained glass window "Saint Jean à Patmos". 48. The altar of the "Sacre-Cœur. 49. The 1873 Rose stained glass window with "Scène de la Passion". 50. A marble statue of Joan of Arc by Charles Desvergnes. 51. Statue of Saint Anthony. 52. An 18th-century painting of the "Annunciation". 53. A 19th-century painting of the Crucifixion. 54. Wooden 17th-century statue of the Virgin Mary with child. 55. A wooden 15th-century crucifix. 56. The 1560 stained glass window "Les Oeuvres de Miséricorde". 57. The Baptistery. 58. The south portal and porch with double-doors leading into the cathedral and a statue of Jesus Christ giving a blessing in the trumeau. 60. The Great Organ of 1660. 61. The west porch with statues of Saint Thomas, Saint Pol and Saint Paul. 62. The Porte des Cacous. The door for lepers. 63. The marble master altar. 64. Oak stalls. 65. St Peter and St Paul Aurélian window. 66. 17th-century wooden statue of Saint Christopher

=== The south aisle ===
==== The baptistery and Acts of Mercy window ====
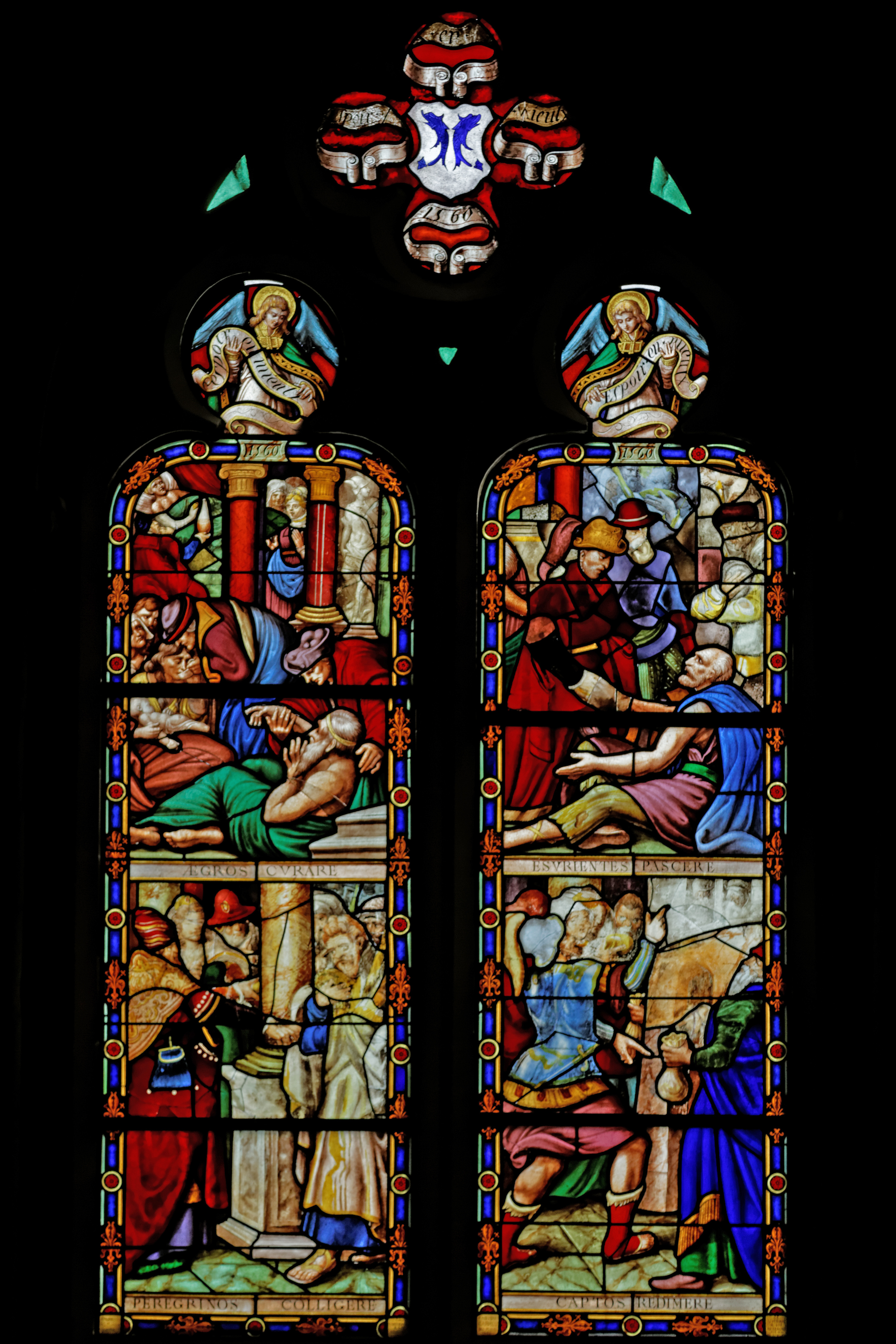
The Acts of Mercy window

The cathedral has a baptistery carved from oak located to the right of the south porch entrance. It was the work of the local studio of Derrien-Pondaven and dates to 1897. This area was formerly the chapel of Saint Martin and Monseigneur de Kersauzon's tomb was located here until moved to the choir area. The font itself is carved from granite. The chapel has three small windows, of which one depicts four of the Corporal Acts of Mercy: healing the sick, feeding the hungry, giving hospitality to travellers and freeing captives. This window dates to 1560 and is one of the oldest in the cathedral. The window bears the arms of the Kerseau family of le Minihy. Some of the pillar capitals in this area are remnants of the earlier Roman basilica.

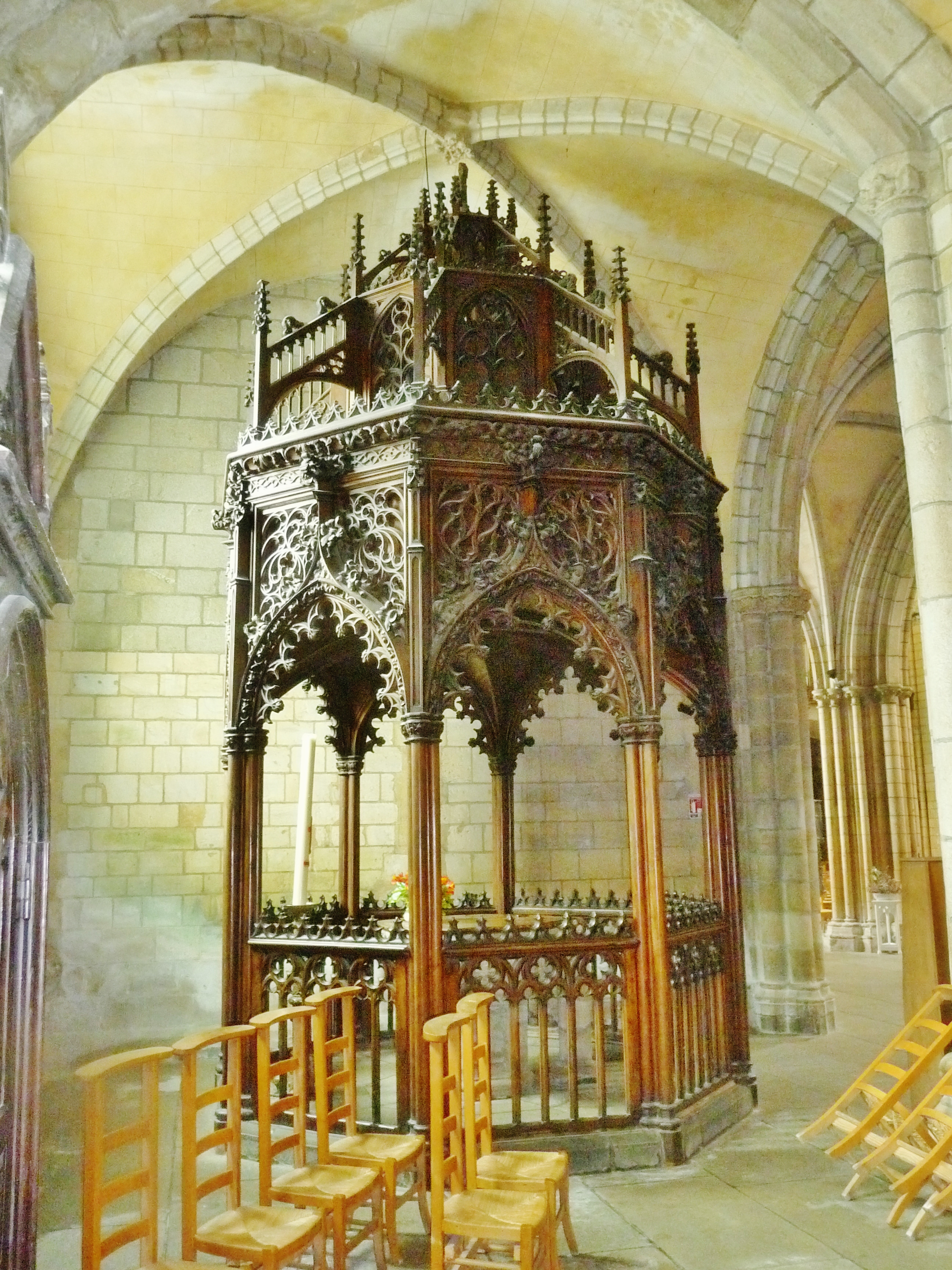
The baptistry

=== The south transept ===
==== Rose window ====
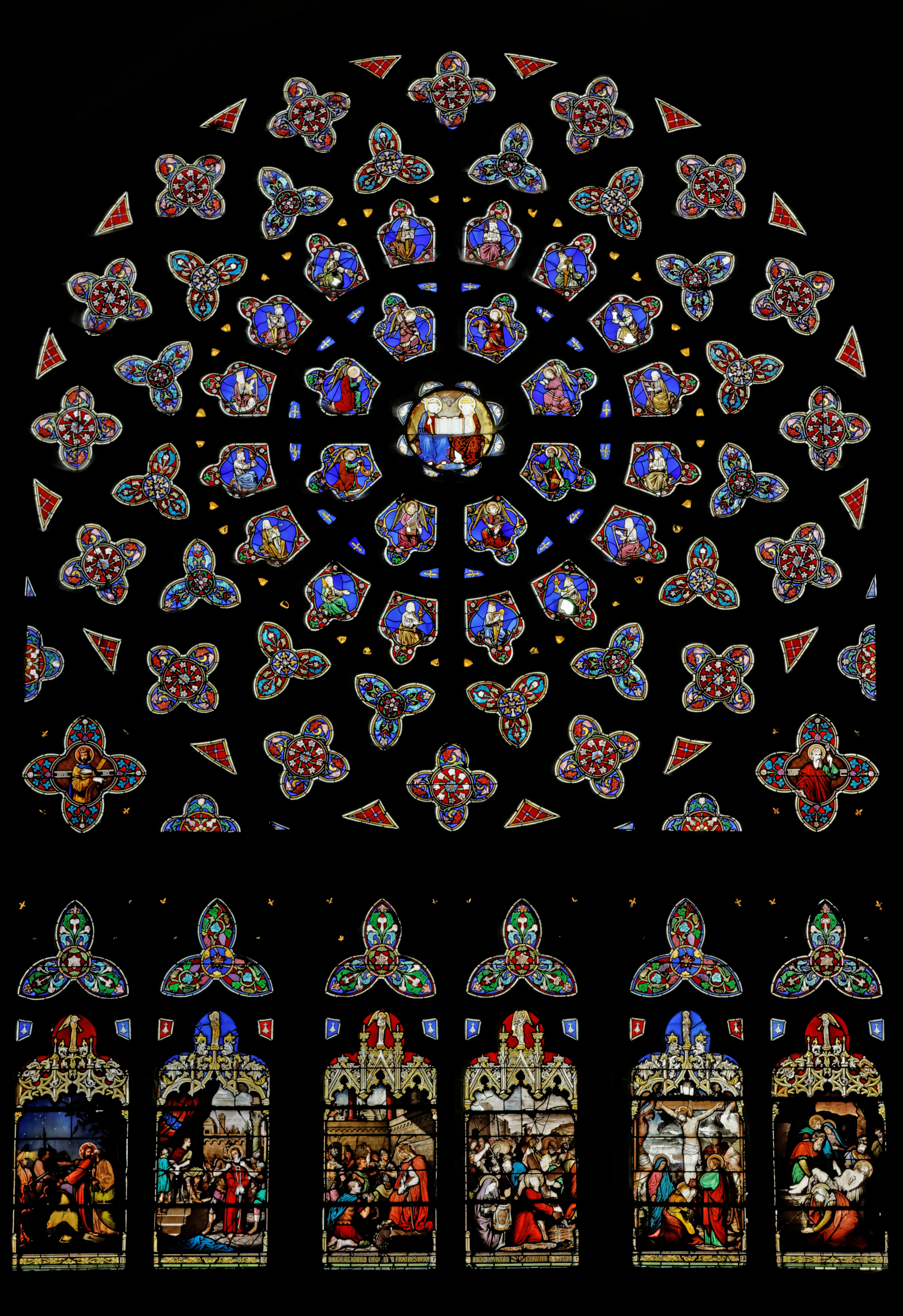
Rose window. At the centre of the rose is a representation of the "Trinity". At the base of the window lancets depict Jesus' arrest, Jesus in front of Pontius Pilate, Jesus being mocked and beaten ("la Dérision"), the journey to Calvary, the crucifixion and the descent from the cross.

This window was the work of the Lobin glass painting workshop in Tours and dates to 1873. The window was a gift from some Saint-Pol-de-Léon clerics. At the heart of the window is a depiction of the Holy Trinity and around this image are eight depictions of angels playing various musical instruments and in a ring around these eight depictions are a further sixteen depictions of prophets, martyrs and saints either singing or playing instruments. Six panels at the base of the window depict the Passion. Beneath this window are two tomb niches. Here one can see a small door which was at one time used to access the cemetery which once surrounded the cathedral. Near to this rose window is an altar in white marble dedicated to the Sacred Heart.

Also in the south transept is a statue of Joan of Arc by Charles Desvergnes and nearby a statue of saint Paul Aurélien. There is also a statue of StAnthony the Hermit (51) dating to 1750, and nearby two crucifix. One dates to the 15th century and came from the "Crucifix des Champs" one of the seven parishes of Minihy-Léon. The second crucifix is known as the "Crucifix de la ville". There is also a painting of Jesus on the cross entitled "La Déploration". This oil painting is signed Charles Lefebvre and dates to 1846. It was a gift to the cathedral from Napoleon III in around 1860. The Virgin Mary is shown kissing Jesus' feet. Beneath this painting is an enfeu which bears the coat of arms of Trédern, a family who lived at Plougoulm. According to Peyron, Guillaume de Trédern, a canon of Léon had founded a chapel devoted to Saint Jérôme in 1510 and an altar can be seen to the right of the enfeu, this altar dedicated to Saint Jérôme. Another oil painting in this area is entitled "Présentation de la règle des Minimes par Saint François de Paule". This 17th-centiury painting is located to the left of Lefebvre's masterpiece. It came from the Minimes chapel which was demolished in 1893. It depicts a Franciscan friar, almost certainly Saint Francis of Paola, holding the book laying down the rules of the Minimes group. On the book is an inscription reading "Haec regula mitis et sancta". He holds the book up to a crowd of onlookers which includes various clerics. The third painting in the south transept depicts the Annunciation. It had been displayed in the cathedral choir area during the 1901 celebration when the cathedral was designated a basilica; the basilica of the Annunciation. Just by this painting and in the third ogive there is a cartouche surmounted by a mitre and cross carried by two angels. The cartouche bears the coat of arms of Monseigneur Guy le Clerc who was the Léon bishop from 1514 to 1521 and his motto "Battons et Abattons". Guy le Clerc was almoner to Queen Claude de France, the wife of François the First.

=== The south ambulatory ===
==== Saint-Roch chapel and altar (45) ====
This altar dates to 1854 and has a statue of saint Roch on the left side and saint Sebastian on the right side. Saint Roch and saint Sebastian were the two saints most invoked to rid an area of the plague. An oil painting in the chapel depicts saint Francis de Sales receiving the scapular. He was the Bishop of Geneva. The altar represents the parish of Saint-Jean l'Evangile, one of the seven parishes of Minihy-Léon. Just by the saint Roch altar there is an enfeu containing the tomb of Jean Le Scaff who was the sénéchal of Léon in 1500 and his wife Anne du Bois of Kerlosquet. The tomb, in engraved black marble, is just by the Saint-Roch chapel. On the tomb there is a carving showing the arms of the Le Scaff family. The vaulting in the chapel bears the heraldic shields of the Kerrom and Carman-Lesquelen families as well as that of the Kerliviry de Cléder family. In this chapel are two stained glass windows. One is dedicated to the Le Scaffs and depicts saint Michael looking down on the fires of hell and the other shows John the Evangelist at Patmos.

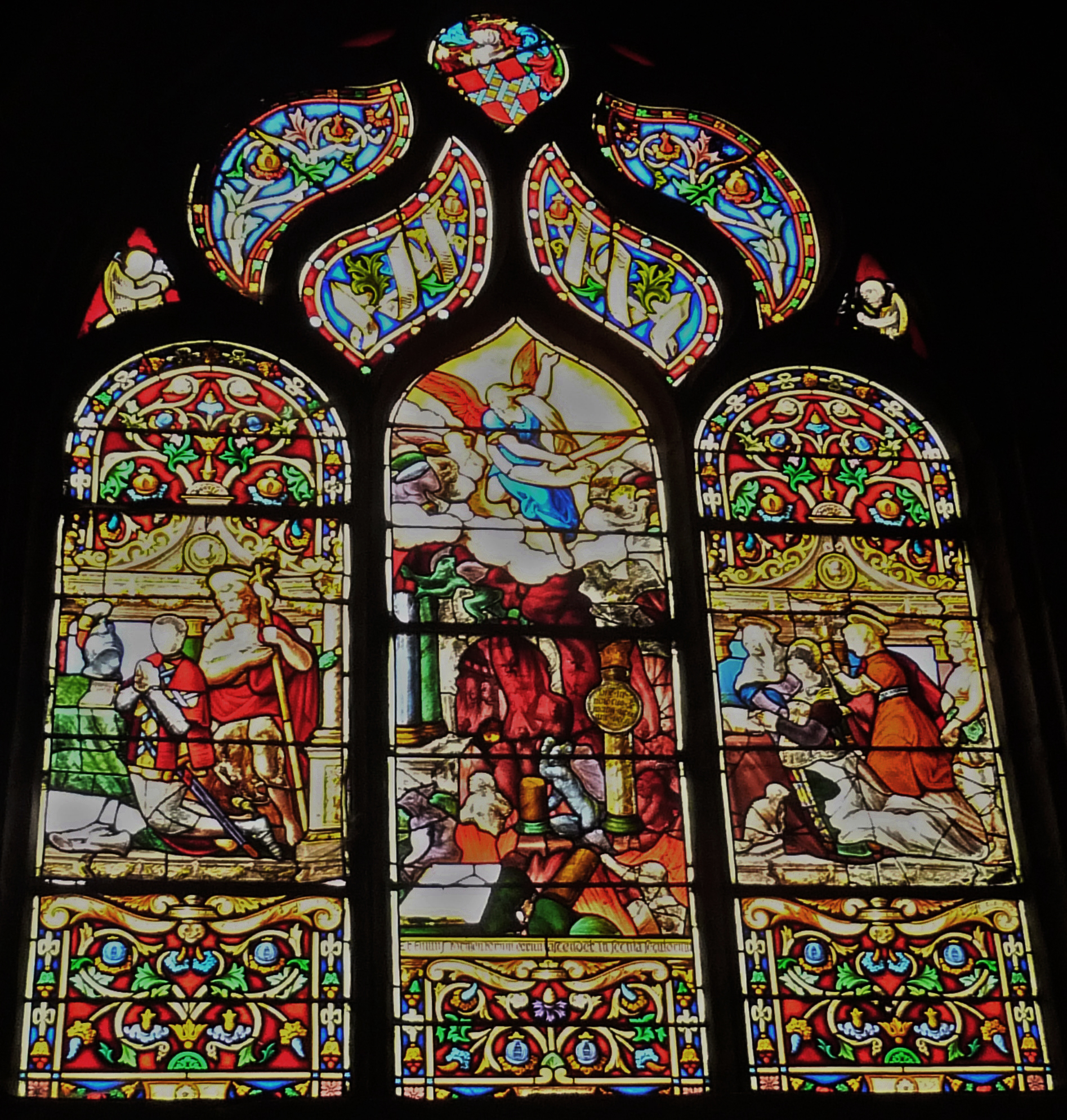
In a scene depicting the "Last Judgement" Saint Michael looks down on the fires of Hell. The outer lancets depict Jean le Scaff and his wife.

The "fires of hell" window of three lancets depicts the last judgement with saint Michael looking down on the fires of hell with demons and some of the damned squirming in torment. The window also depicts the donors, Jean le Scaff and his wife. It dates to the first half of the 16th century and was restored at the end of the 19th century.

==== Saint Jean à Patmos window ====
This window is by Lobin of Tours and dates to 1888. The window also bears the coat of arms of Penhout allied with Parcevaux. John is shown on his knees writing as a vision of God appears to him. The Tetramorph appear in the tracery.

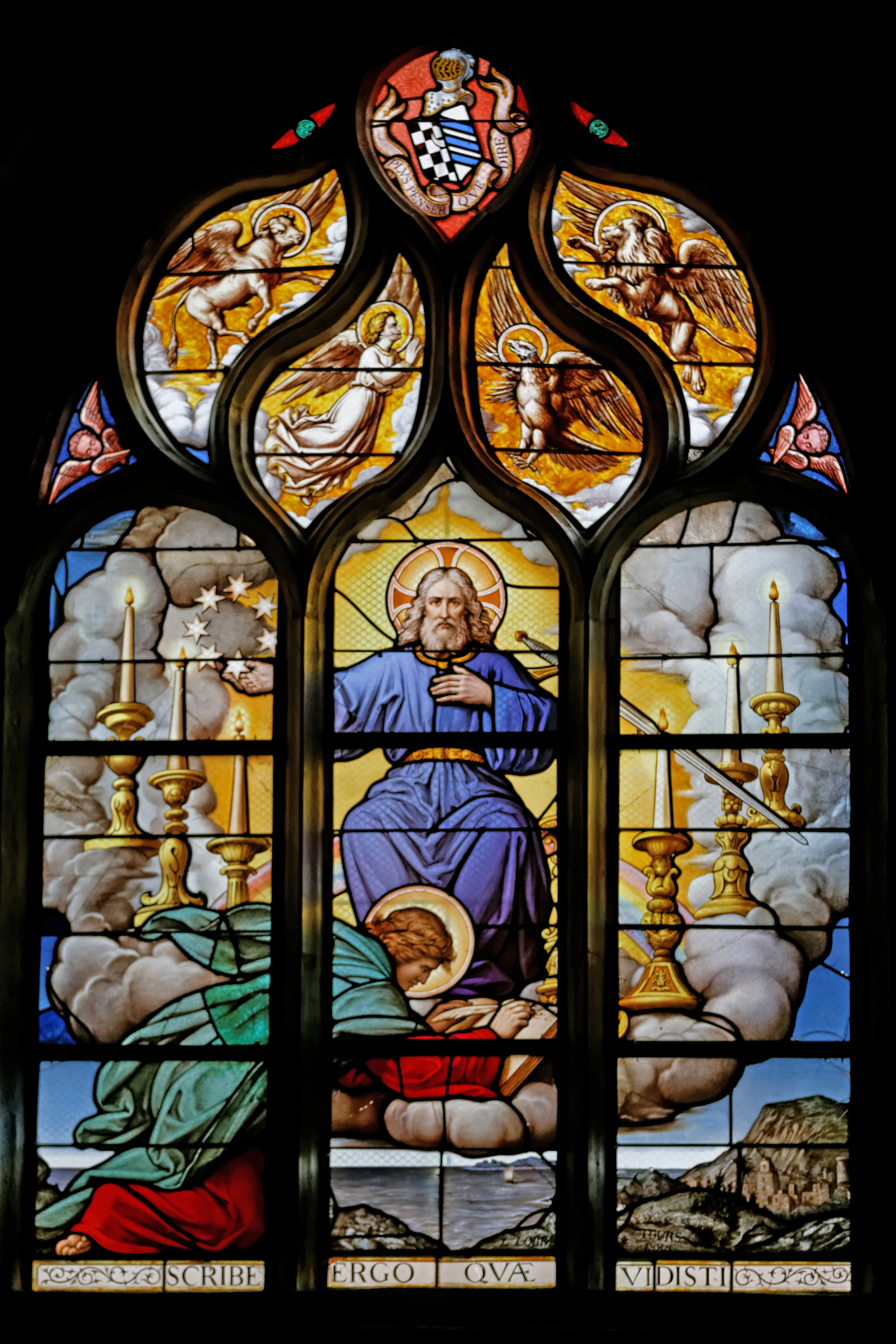
A window by Lucien Léopold Lobin of Tours dating to 1888 and depicting John the Evangelist's apocalyptic vision at Patmos. Saint John kneels writing as God appears to him.

In the vaulting keystone facing this window is a shield bearing the arms of Forêt Villeneuve. In 1487 there had been an abbot of Saint-Mathieu of this name who came from Minihy. Between the Le Scaff window and that depicting John at Patmos is a small painting on wood dating to the 16th century. It depicts the "Adoration des Mages". There is also a large wooden crucifix in the chapel which came from the Minihy parish of "Le crucifix des champs". As we leave the Saint-Roch chapel we see three small altars with a credence and a piscina. The first two altars are carved from white stone whilst the third which faces the Sainte-Anne chapel is carved from Kersanton. The altarpiece of this third altar depicts the Virgin Mary with the body of Jesus laid across her knees.

==== Saint Anne's chapel, altar and altarpiece (42) ====
The chapel altar dates to the 17th century and has a statue of St Anne in the centre, St Vincent de Paul on the left side and St Francis on the right side. A stained glass window in the chapel depicts six scenes from the lives of St Anne and Joachim, parents of the Virgin Mary. The window dates to 1891 and was the work of Hucher fils (Fabrique du Carmel du Mans). The six scenes depicted are the Angel Gabriel ordering Joseph to go to the golden gate, Joseph meeting Anne at the golden gate, the Virgin Mary being presented at the temple, the Grand Priest refusing the gifts of Joseph and Anne, the Angel Gabriel ordering Anne to go to the golden gate and the birth of Mary. The altar in the chapel is said to hold relics of St Emilien. Also in the chapel is an oil painting showing Anne teaching Mary.

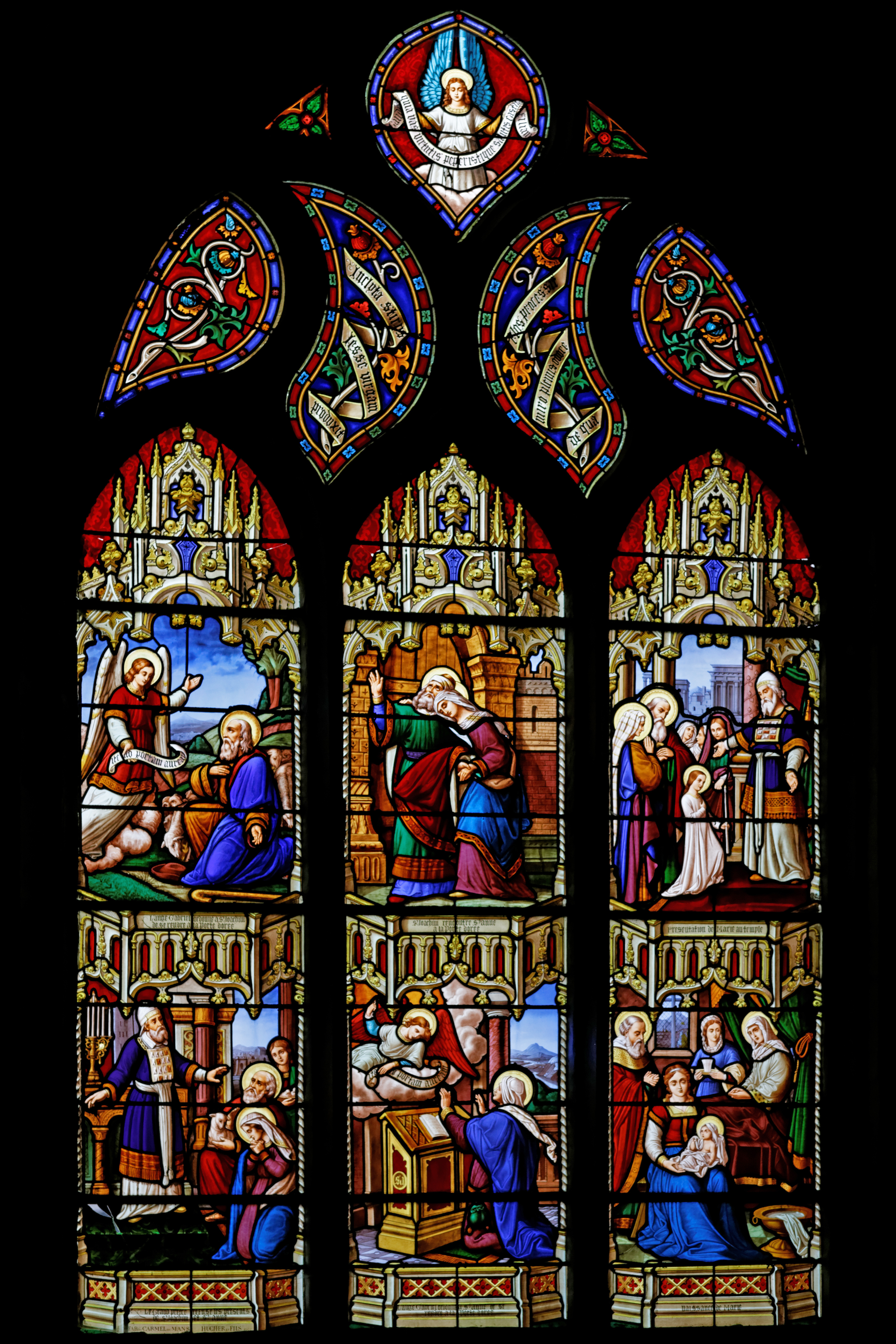
The stained glass window in bay 14 depicts scenes from the life's of Sainte Anne and Saint Joseph the parents of Jesus.

==== The Saint-Pol Chapel and "Notre Dames des Sept Douleurs" ====
This chapel was created by combining two earlier ones. The vaulting keystone bears the arms of the Kerc'hoent family from Minihy. The first window depicts the raising of Lazarus. The vaulting also includes the arms of Hamon de Penanrue. In this chapel, there is a bizarre painting in the vaulting of three faces seemingly joined. The second window depicts Jesus amongst a group of children.

==== Raising of Lazarus window (37) ====
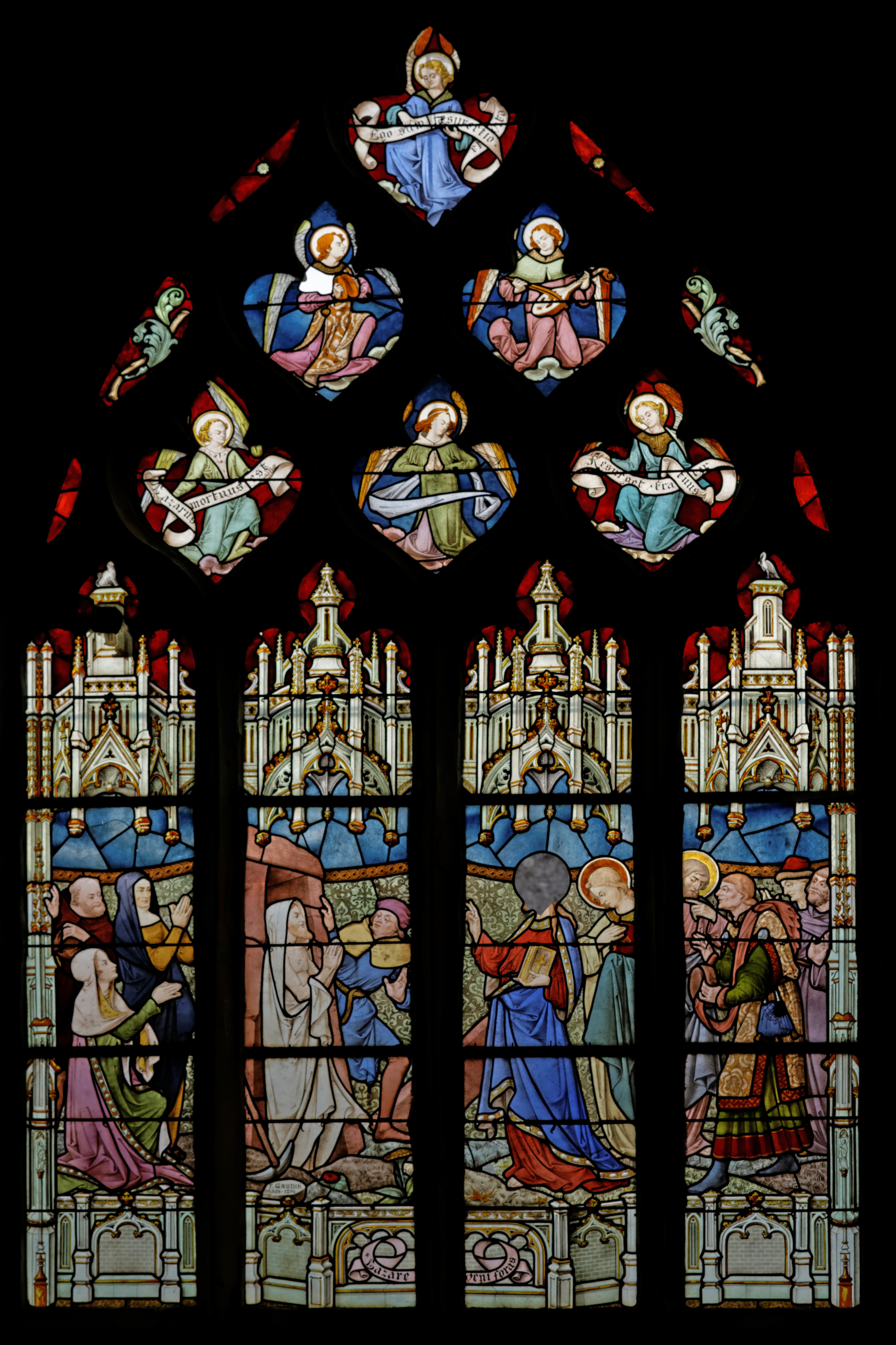
The Raising of Lazarus

This four-light window dates to 1894 and depicts angels in the tracery playing instruments, praying or holding inscribed scrolls. The window was a gift to the cathedral from the Guébriant family. Also here is the tomb of Canon François Le Veyer.

==== Window. "Laissez venir à moi les petits enfants" (38) ====
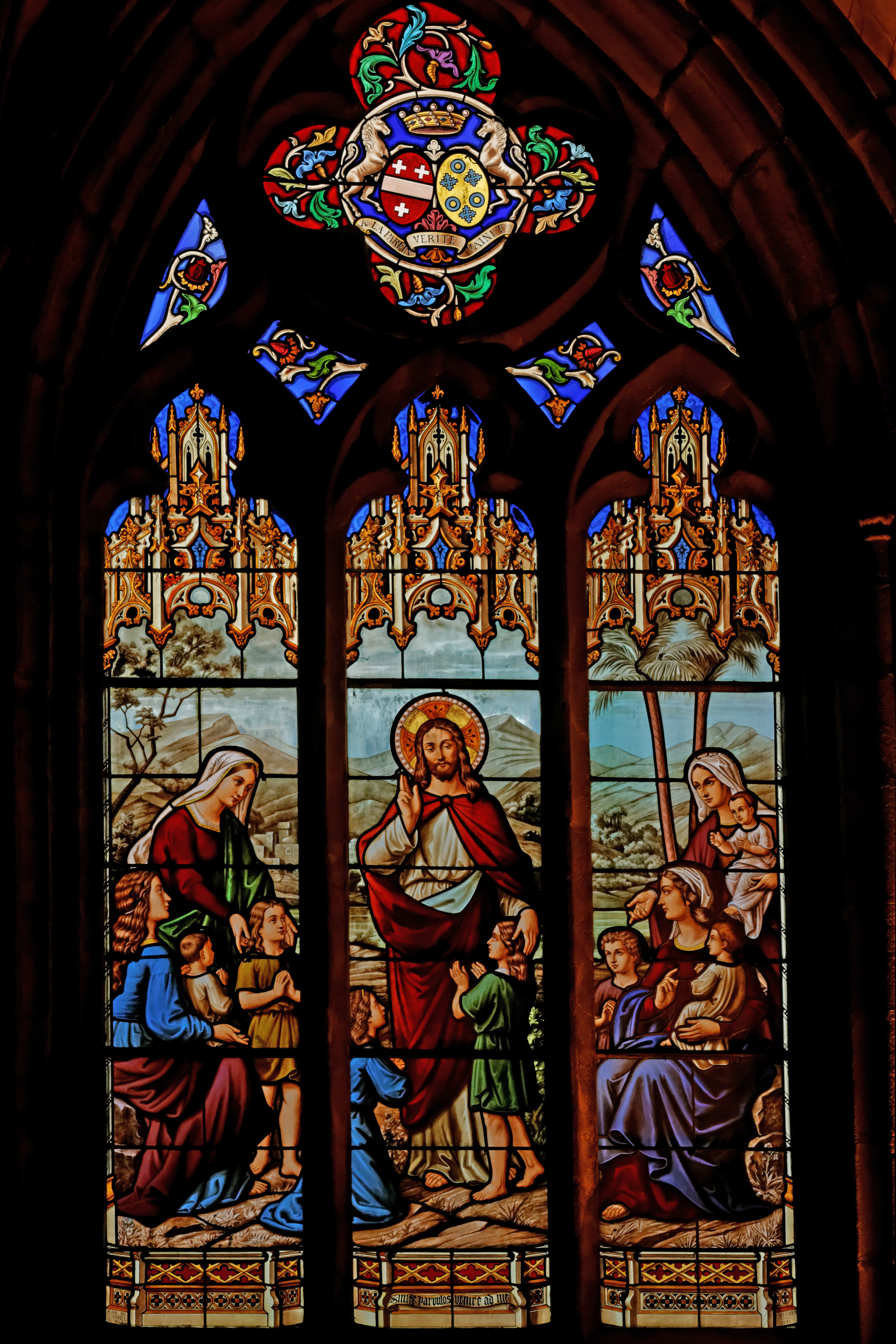
The stained glass window of 1891 by F.Huchet et fils and the Carmel factory. The window represents Christ among the children

This stained glass window dates to 1891 and represents the parable related in Luke 18- "But Jesus called them unto him, and said, Suffer little children to come unto me, and forbid them not: for of such is the kingdom of God. Verily I say unto you, Whosoever shall not receive the kingdom of God as a little child shall in no wise enter therein".

Against the chapel wall there is an oil painting of 1757 depicting Saint Pol defeating the dragon by Jean-Vincent L'hermitais (1700-1758). There is also a painting representing the Extreme Unction. Legend states that Saint Pol delivered the Ile de Batz from a dragon which was terrorising the island. He was assisted by a knight from Cléder subsequently known as "Kergournadec'h" based on the fact that he was fearless ("il ne recule pas"/"He did not flinch"). Amongst the items kept in the cathedral sacristy is the "étole" (stole) which legend has it saint Pol put around the dragon's neck and led it towards the sea.

Also against the lateral wall of the choir is the gisant of Monseigneur Guillaume de Kersauzon. This stucco 19th-century gisant marks the tomb of Guillaume de Kersauzon who died in 1327. He was made Bishop of Léon in 1297. The tomb bears the coat of arms of the de Kersauzon family with the inscription "Hic jacket in pace Guillelmus de Kersauzon eps Léon. qui.Capellae.Sancti. Martini. In hac ecclesia.cathli.fundamenta locavit. Obit A.DNI. MCCCXXVIi." The gisant is carved from white stone and at the deceased's feet is a carving of the Saint Pol dragon.

==== Statue of Saint Apollonia (29) ====
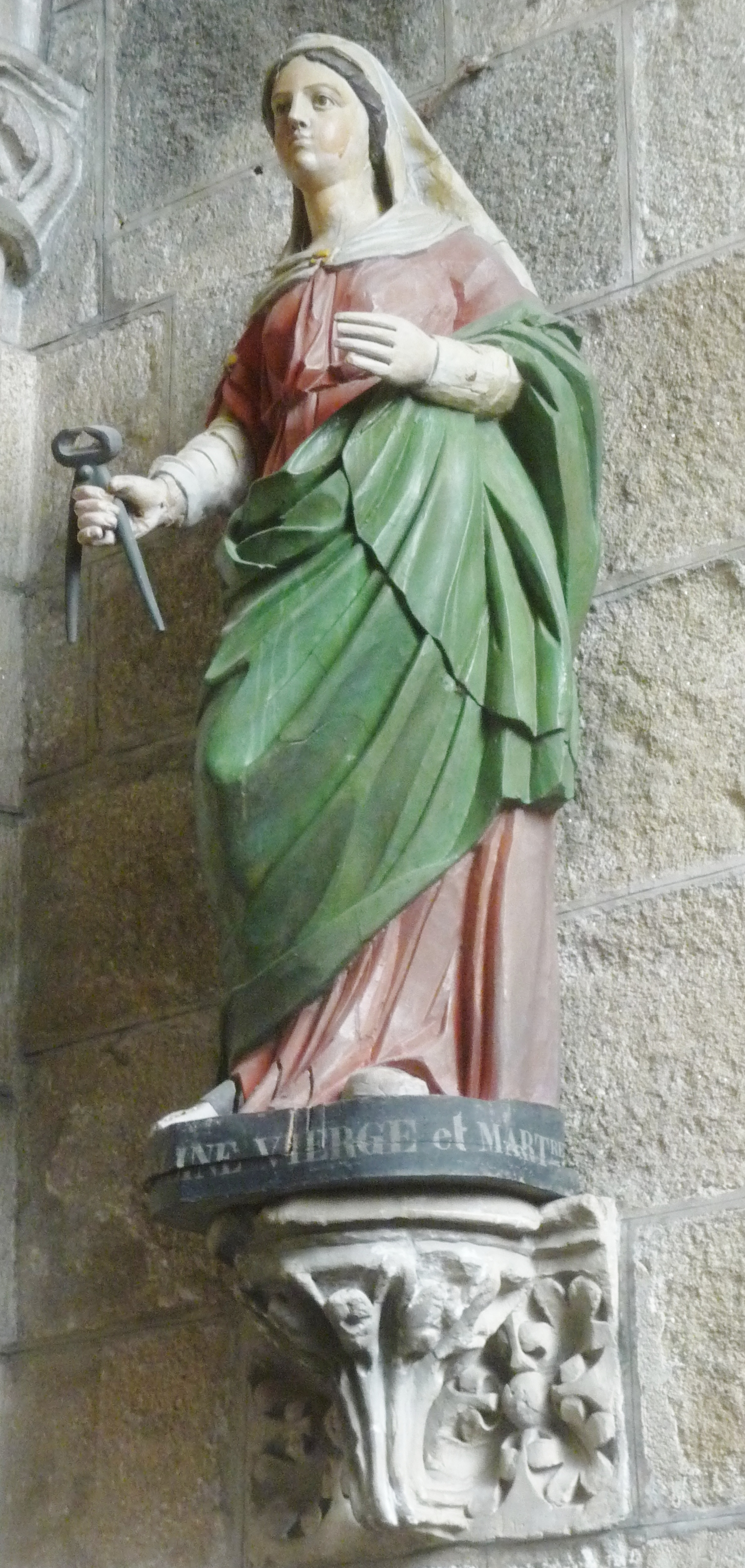
Statue of Saint Apollonia. She holds a pair of pinchers to remind us of her martyrdom.

This wooden statue dates to the 17th century. Saint Apollonia was one of a group of virgin martyrs who suffered in Alexandria during a local uprising against the Christians prior to the persecution of Decius. According to legend, her torture included having all of her teeth violently pulled out or shattered. For this reason, she is popularly regarded as the patroness of dentistry and those suffering from a toothache or other dental problems. In the statue, she holds a pair of pinchers to remind us of her martyrdom.

By the statue of sainte Apollonia is a statue of saint Anthony (Anthony the Great) with his pig.

=== Saint Joseph's chapel ===
The stained glass window in this chapel carries the coat of arms of three families, the de Rodellecs, the Boscal de Réals and the Collins. It represents the birth of Christ, the presentation in the temple, the last supper and the resurrection. In an enfeu to the right is a renaissance style tomb bearing the arms of the Richard family. The inscription reads "MIRABILI. .OLIVARIO. RICHARD. ARCHIDNO. AQVENSI. IN. ECCLESIA. LEONEN. ET. NANETEN. CANONICO.PARLAMENTI. BRITANIE. CONSILIARIO. R. P. DNI. EPI. NANETEN. VICARIO. MERITISSIMO. FRANCISCUS. RICHARD. PROTONOTARIVS. APOSTOLICVS. ARDS. AC. CANONICVS. LEON. ET. NANETEN. FRATER. MOESTISSIMVS. FRATRI. CARISSIMO. ET. OPTIMO. HOC. SAXUM. EREXIT.ANNOS. NATVS. LXIX. OBIIT. A. D. M. VC. XXXIX. CARAT DOUE. MEULI DOUE. ENORI DOUE".

Buried here is Olivier Richard the eminent archdeacon and canon of Nantes and his brother François Richard, archdeacon and canon of both Léon and Nantes. It was the Richards who built and lived in the house in the place du Petit-Cloître and their coat of arms can still be seen on the front of the building. In this location is the tomb of Monseigneur Jean Giles du Coetlosquet. This marble cenotaph remembers Monseigneur Jean-Gilles du Coëtlosquet who was born on 15 September 1700 in Saint-Pol-de-Léon. He died on 21 March 1784 in Paris. He was an academic and taught the future kings of France Louis XVI, Louis XVIII and Charles X. He was elected member of the French Academy in 1761. The chapel's 19th-century altar has a tabernacle decorated with statuettes of the apostles and the tabernacle's door bears a bas-relief of the "Bon Pasteur" and the three arches of the antependium have medallions depicting the Virgin Mary, saint Joseph and the baby Jesus. Earlier this chapel had been known as the "La chapelle de Toussaints" or "La chapelle Saint-Sacrement" and had been created primarily to serve the parish of Minihy.

There is an "enfeu" (a walled up tomb) on the gospel side of the chapel which contains the heart of Monseigneur Léopold de Léséleuc, a Breton who had served as the Bishop of Autun, Chalons and Mâcon from 1814 to 1873. The chapel contains many other tombs including on the epistle side the tombs of Jean Couhard, a vicar of Toussaints and master of music, Nicolas Denis, a canon of Léon (just by the balustrade) and Guillaume Corre, a canon of Léon. Tombs on the gospel side of the chapel include that of Prigent Le Moine, Canon of Léon, Prigent Le Ny, treasurer and Canon of Léon, rector of Plougoulm, and founder of the Minimes in 1622 and Yves Le Gat, another Canon of Léon. Also buried in the chapel, although the exact locations are not known, are the tombs of René de la Haye, the son of Yves and Claudine de Launoy, and brother of Anne Renée married in 1670 to Jean du Dresnay, Claudine de Launoy, a noblewoman of the Roches family, Jean de Quelen, a sieur of Dresnay in a tomb marked with the Dresnay arms, Christophe Grall, a vicar of Toussaints, 'Denis de Keredern, Canon of Léon, Etienne de la Coste, Archdeacon and Canon of Léon and Claude Allaire, a Léon official.

Outside the chapel is a plaque recording that on 1 September 1901 the cathedral was designated a "minor basilica".

=== The north ambulatory ===
==== Window depicting the nativity, the presentation in the temple, the last supper and the resurrection (26) ====
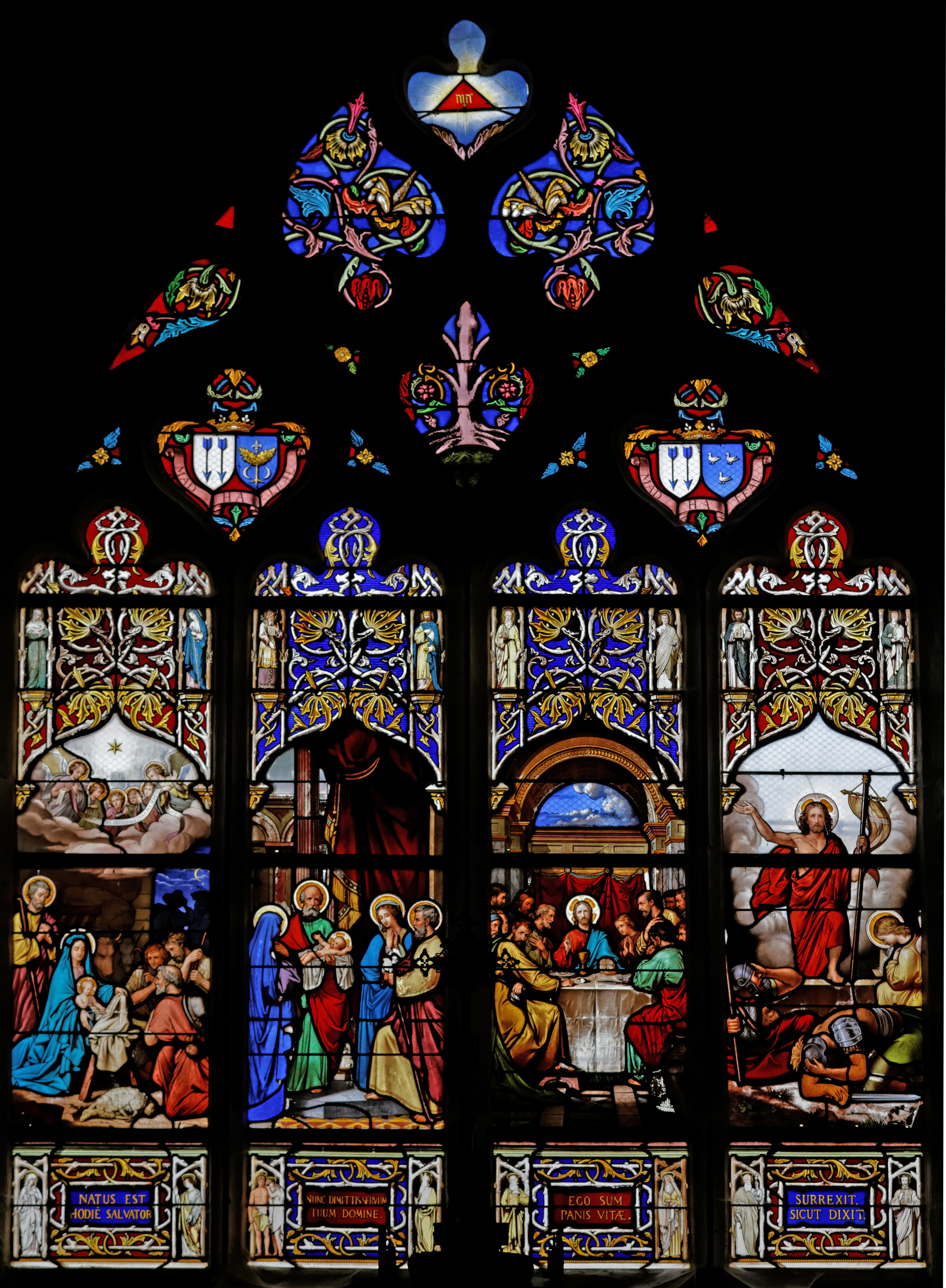
Stained glass window depicting four scenes from the life of Jesus Christ. Each lancet has a descriptive inscription "NATIS EST HODIE SALVATOR; NUNC DEMITTIS SERVUM TUUM DOMINE; EGO SUM PANIS VITAE; SURREXCIT SICUT DIXIT". The window also carries the coats of arms of the Rodellec family crossed with those of Poulpiquet and Rodellec crossed with those of Relas. It also bears the motto "MAD HA LEAL".

This Lobin stained glass window dates to 1867 and in four lancets depicts the nativity, the presentation in the temple, the last supper and the resurrection, scenes from the life of Jesus Christ. Above the sacristry door the stained glass window bears the arms of the Kervenoaêl family and is based on Raphael's painting of the miraculous catch. Beneath this window is the statue "Notre-Dame de Bon-Secours".

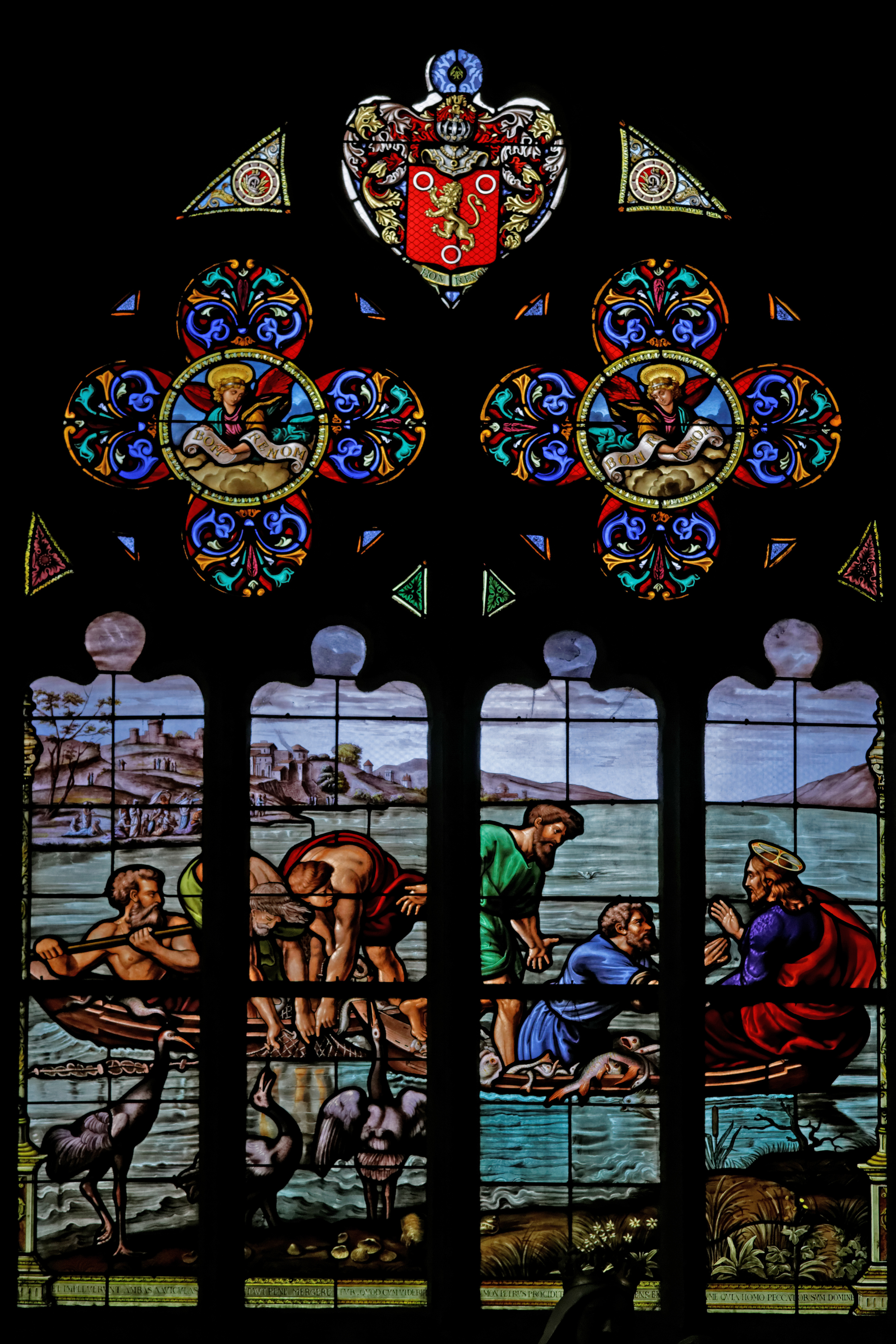
The Miraculous Catch window

==== Window "Apparition du Sacré-Cœur" (7) ====
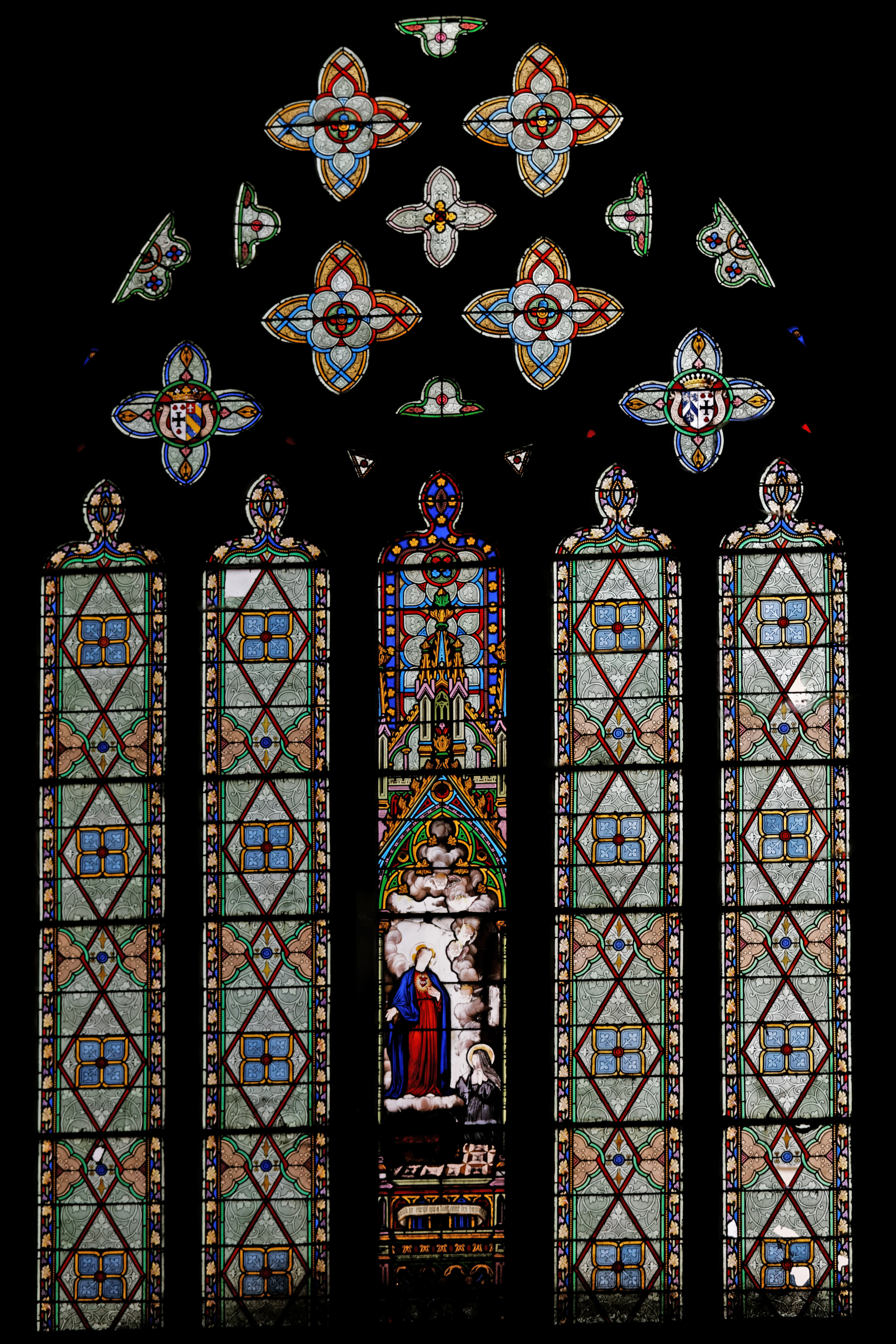
Window depicting the "Apparition du Sacré-Cœur"

This five-light grisaille window dates to the 19th century. The depiction of the "Apparition du Sacré-Cœur" appears in the central lancet. The artist is not known.

==== The "Songe de St-Pol" altar (8 ,9 and 10) ====
The altarpiece, dating to the 19th century, is wooden and has bas-reliefs as decoration, that on the left representing the "Dream of Saint Pol" and that on the right "The fisherman discovering the bell". To the left of the altar is a plaster statue of Saint Herbot dating to the 20th century and to the right is another plaster statue this depicting Saint Eloi. In the centre is a third plaster statue representing Notre-Dame des Sept-Douleurs, this set in part of the wooden altarpiece. This also dates to the 20th century. The cathedral has in fact 22 altars, partly due to the fact that it serves the seven parishes of Minihy, At one time the number was far higher, and an excess of altars and statues was making it difficult for people to navigate freely around the nave, ambulatory and choir. Bishop Jean-Louis Gouyon de Vaudurand issued an edict which had 14 altars removed and forbade the use of 12 others. He also had many statues removed. The content of many of the 22 altars retained were reduced to plain stone altars.

==== The "Icone de Marie" altar (13) ====
This altar made of varnished wood is the work of A.Bizard and dates to 1926. It has an icon on display depicting the Virgin Mary.

==== Window "La Vierge à l'offrande" (15) ====
This 19th-century stained glass window depicts "la Vierge à l'offrande". A Carmel/Hucher et fils window.

==== The cenotaph of René de Léseleuc (25) ====
René de Léseleuc was Bishop of Autun.

==== Statue of Sainte Marguerite (30) ====
This statue dates to the 17th century. This saint (St. Margaret of Antioch) was invoked by pregnant women. Nearby is a bronze 19th-century replica of the statue of saint Peter in the Vatican.

==== Oil painting "'La Mort du Juste" (39) ====
This oil painting dates to the 17th century. See Isiah 57. 1–2.

==== Reliquary chapel ====
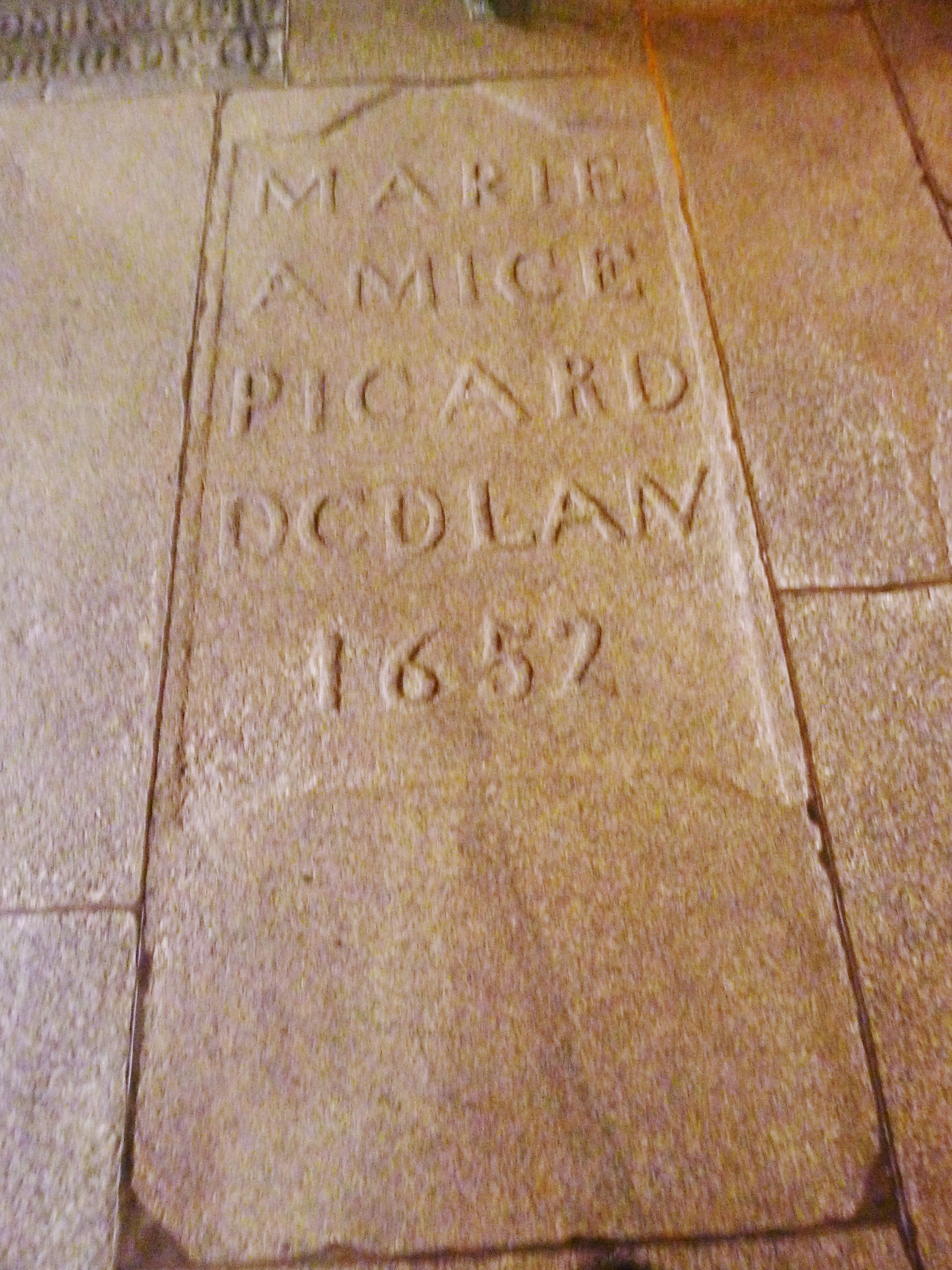
The tombstone of Marie-Amice Picard

The altar in this chapel dates to 1897 as does the reliquary. The latter contains the skull of saint-Pol along with one of his fingers and a bone from his arm. There are also relics relating to saint Hervé, saint Lawrence and saint Joëvin. There is also a pine needle said to be from the crown of thorns. Nearby is the "cloche de Saint Pol". There is an enfeu in the chapel which bears the arms of Trézéguer-Mahé. In front of the altar is the tomb of Yves de Poulpry, the cantor of the cathedral and the tomb of Chrestien de la Masse. In the area are several tombstones including that of Marie-Amice Picard, a mystic who died in 1652 at the age of 17, having allegedly subsisted without food all that time.

==== The Chapelle de Kerautret ====
The chapel contains a tomb in kersanton bearing the arms of Traonelorn and Kerautret. The same arms can be seen in the chapel vaulting. By the chapel altar is a tombstone marking the grave of Christophe Traonelorn of Kerautret. In the chapel is a fresco representing the last judgement and a plain window bearing the arms of the Guébriants. As one enters the chapel and on the left, there is a stoup supported by two angels and bearing the arms of the Traonelorns. The altar is also known as the "Autel à la sirène".

Finally in the north ambulatory is an 1897 "Annunciation" group and a fresco depicting the "Final Judgement".

=== The north transept ===
There are various statues in the north transept; a 17th-century wooden statue of saint Joseph, a modern sculpture of Notre-Dame de Lourdes and a 20th-century marble statue of sainte-Thérèse. There is also a 17th-century wooden statue of an unidentified saint and a 16th-century wooden crucifix.

==== Notre-Dame du Mont-Carmel altar (36) ====
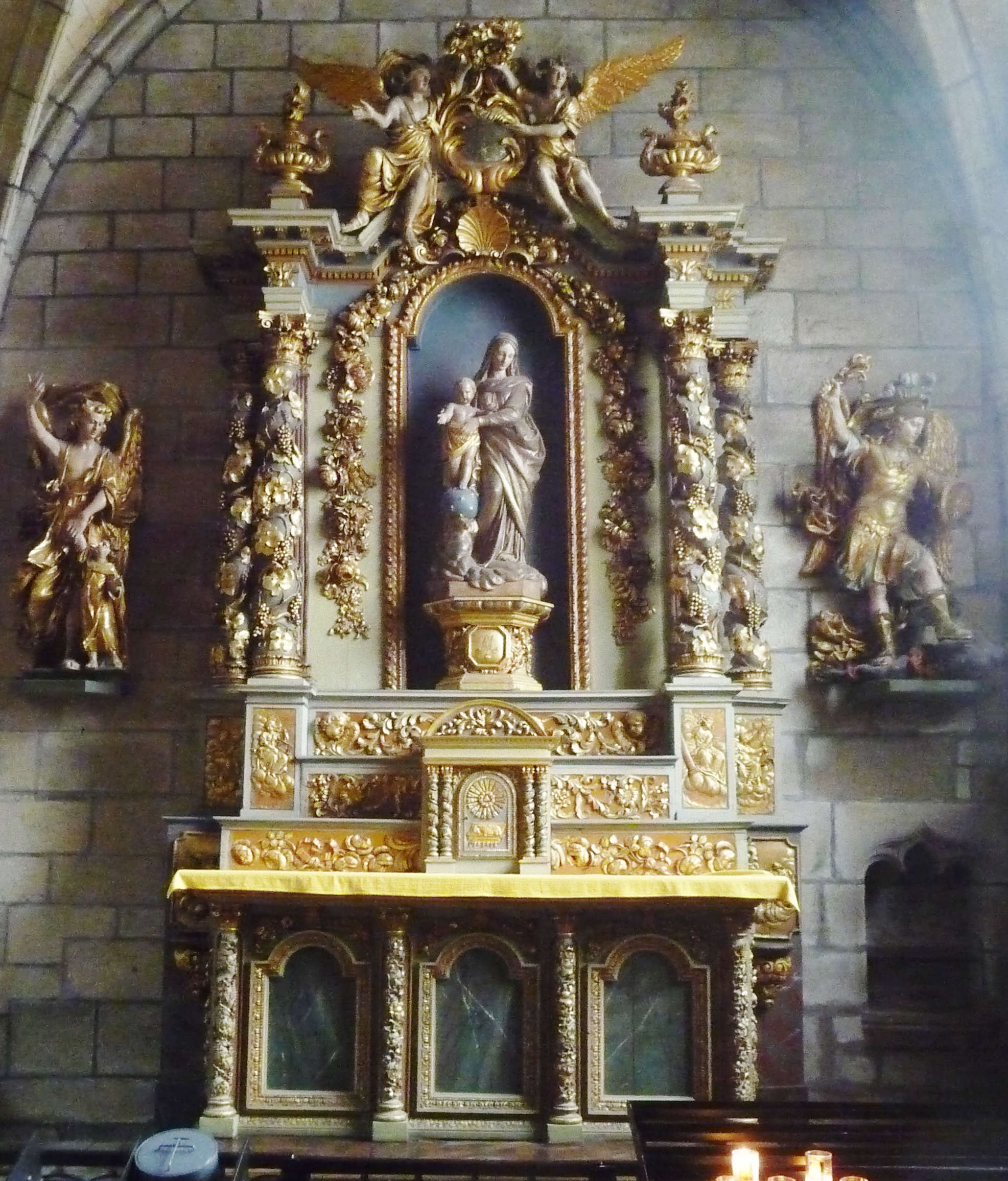
The Notre-Dame du Mont-Carmel altar and altarpiece

Carved from wood, polychromed and dating to the 17th century, the altarpiece was placed in the cathedral as recently as 1973. It had originally been in the Convent of the Carmes which was razed to the ground during the French revolution. In the centre of the altarpiece is a statue of the Virgin Mary with child and on the left side of the altar there is a sculpture depicting saint-Raphaël with the young Tobias and on the right side a statue of saint Michael slaying the dragon. The altar's bas-reliefs represent the four cardinal virtues, Temperance, Justice, Force and Prudence. In front of the altar balustrade is the tombstone of François Le Veyer of Kerisnel, who had died in 1570 and been one of the officials in charge of the parish of Saint-Pierre which included Roscoff West and Santec. Saint-Pierre was one of the constituent parishes of Minihy-Léon. In the vaulting here we see the arms of Kerautret, Chavigné (Monseigneur Christophe de Chavigné was the Léon bishop from 1521 to 1554 and he was succeeded by his brother Monseigneur Rolland de Cavigné, bishop from 1554 to 1562) and Richard. There is also the arms of the Kerguiziau family. There is a large enfeu bearing the arms of the Lesguens. Also in the part of the cathedral where one enters the choir there is an enfeu bearing the arms of Monseigneur Sergeant who was a bishop at Quimper.

==== Rosary altar (19) ====
The 17th-century altar and altarpiece is in one of the lateral chapels on either side of the choir. This chapel served the parish of Saint-Jean Baptiste or Saint-Jean de la ville, one of the seven Minihy parishes served by the Léon bishopric. The altar includes a painting which was acquired by the "congrégation du Rosaire" in 1643 and is a panoramic view of St Pol de Léon at that time. One can see the famous Carmes convent since destroyed. This panorama is the backcloth to a depiction of the Virgin Mary and John the Baptist showing the city to Christ. In the accompanying altarpiece, 15 small medallions illustrate the "mystères du Rosaire". In front of the altar is the flat grave of Canon Kerguz holding the cantorial baton, the insignia of the cathedral cantor. This chapel holds the three windows which tell of the St Pol legend. Also in this location is the Chapelle du Saint-Sacrament, a place kept for the public to sit quietly in contemplation.

Stained glass windows with scenes from events in Saint Pol's life

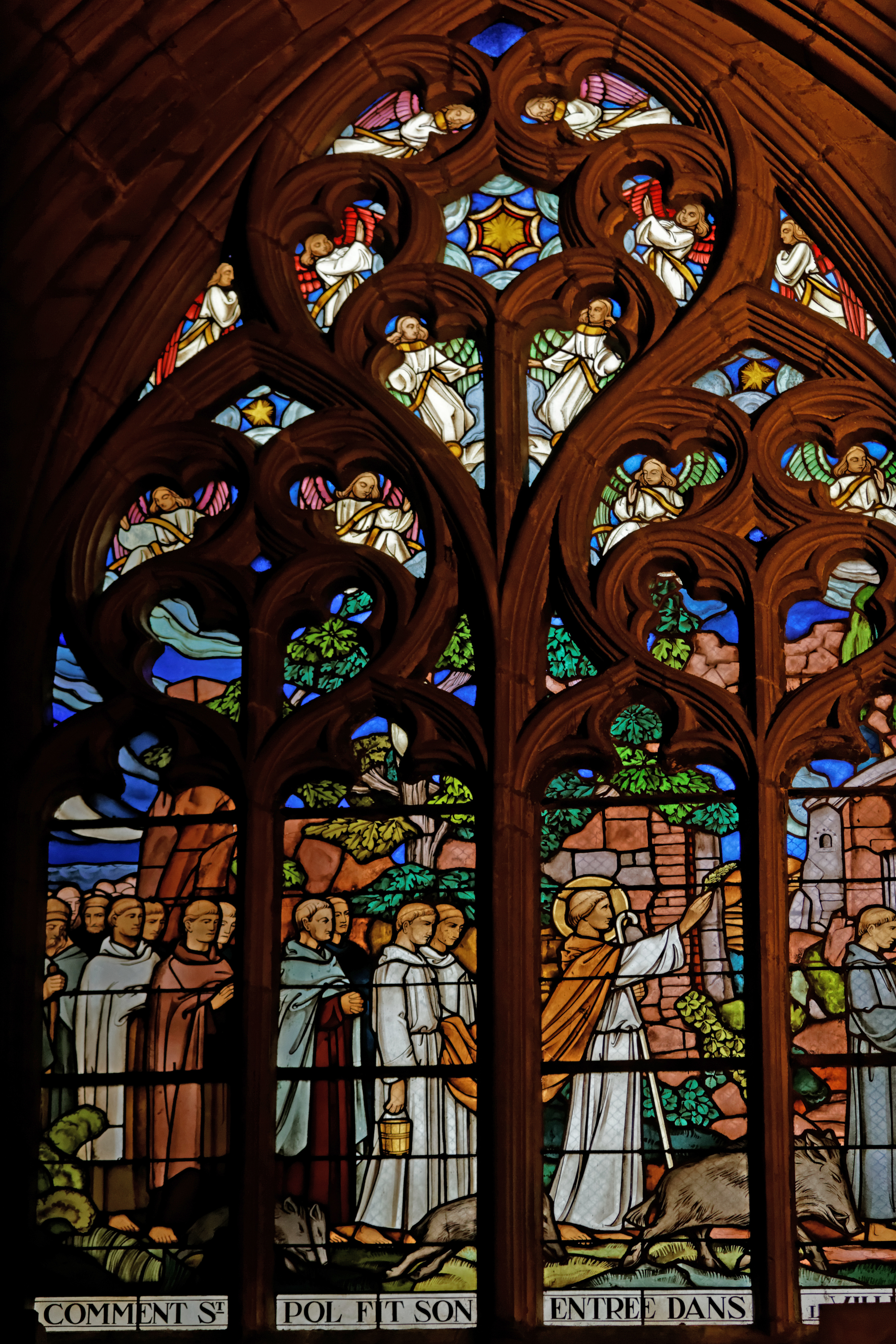
How Saint-Pol-Aurélien entered the town of the dead ("Ville Morte")

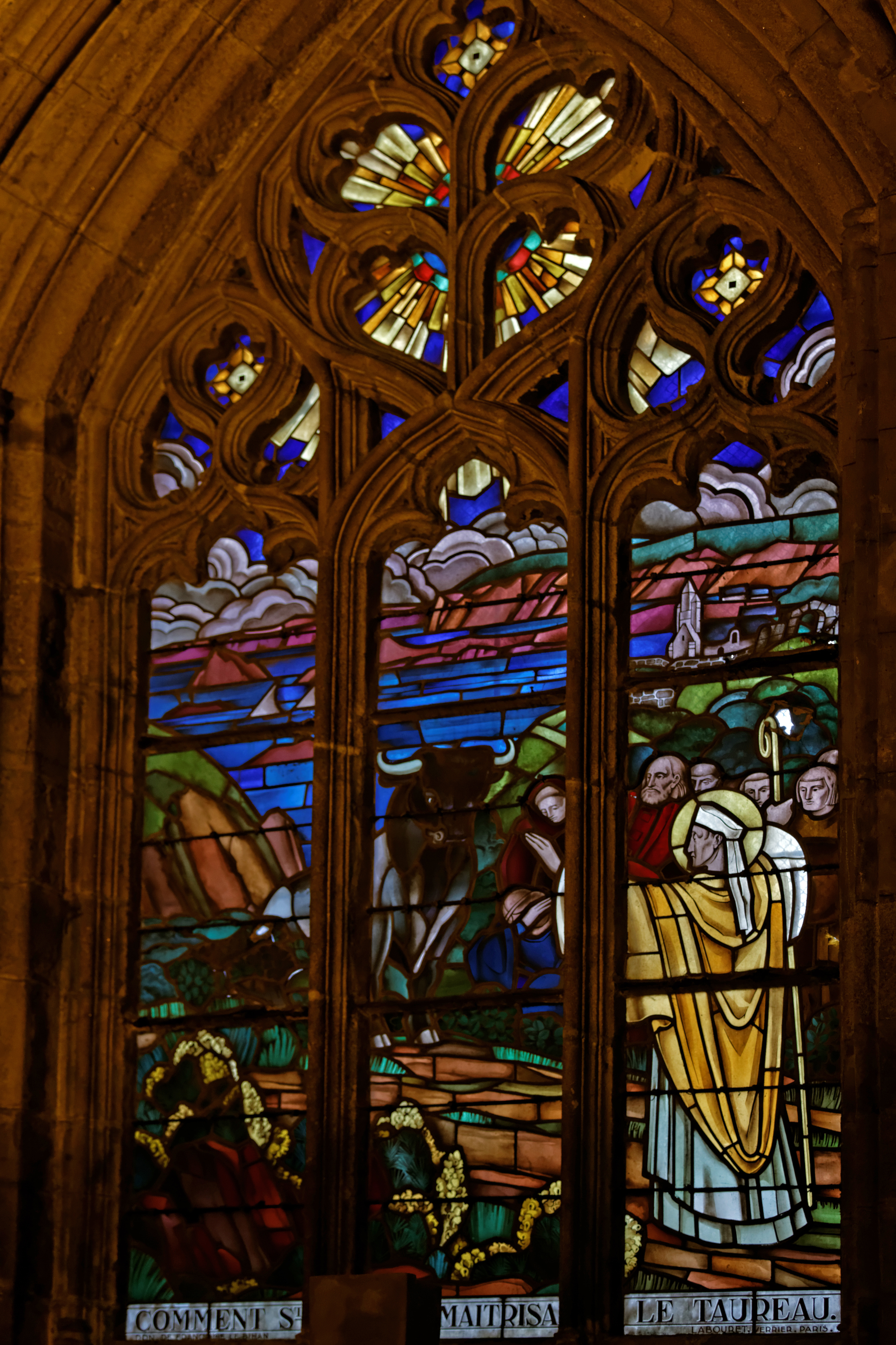
How Saint-Pol-Aurélien controlled the bull. The window was a gift from François Le Bihan.

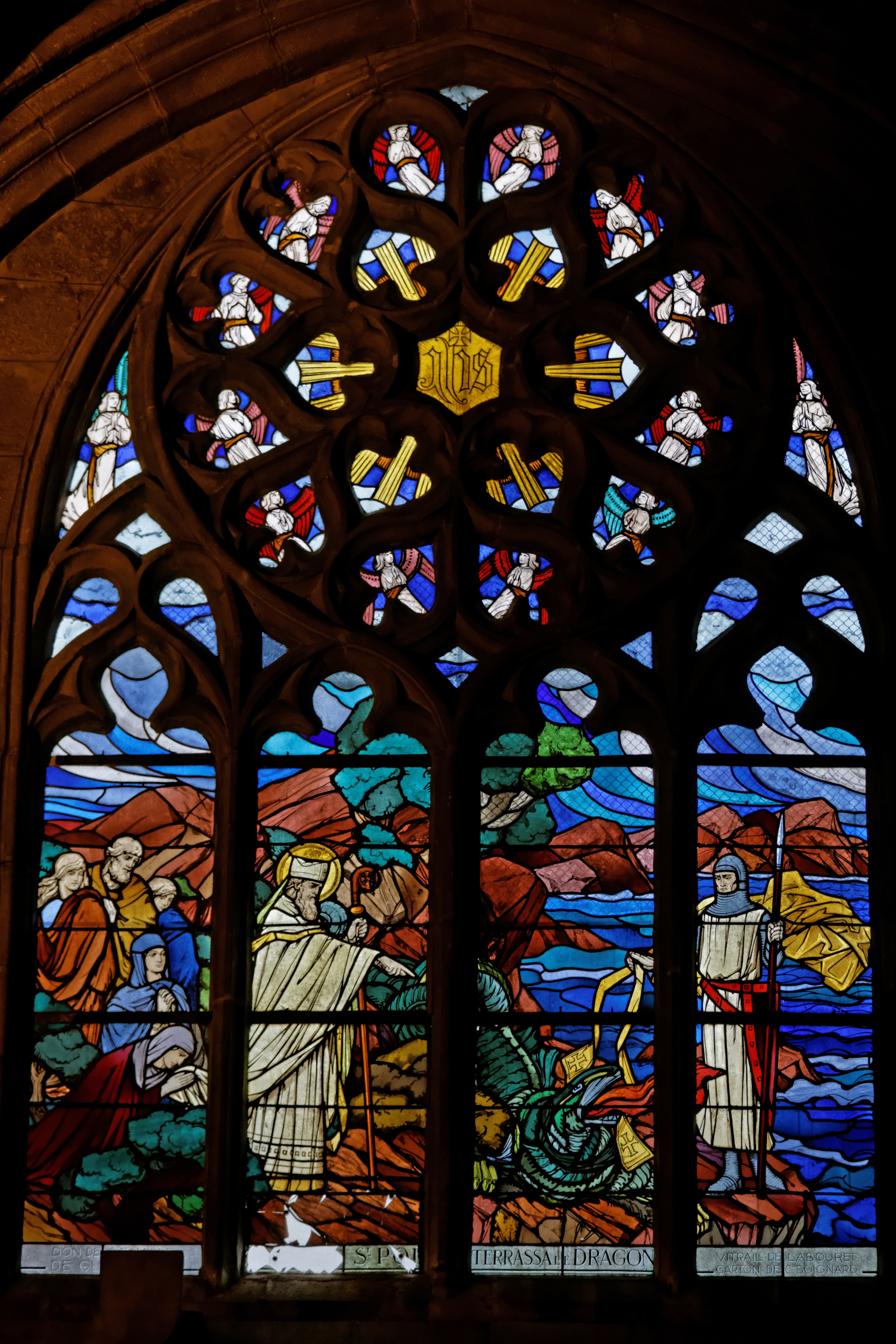
How Saint-Pol-Aurélien slew the Elorn dragon. The window was a gift from the Guebriant family.

=== Last Judgement window ===
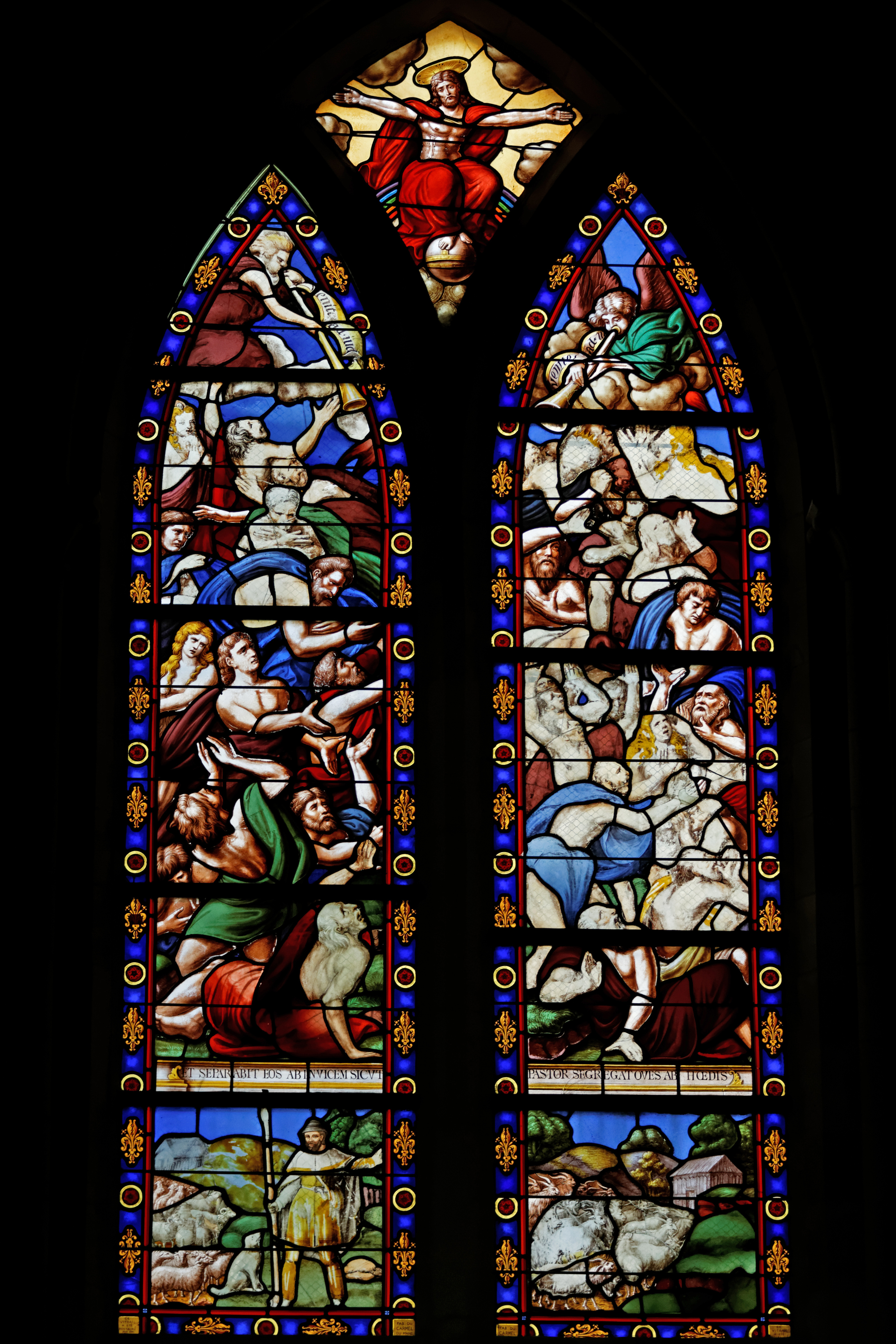
Last Judgement window

The window has two lights these depicting a multitude of people milling around having heard Christ's judgement. In the left light are the "chosen" and in the right light are the "damned". In panels at the top of each light are angels blowing trumpets. Christ appears in a panel at the top of the window. His arms are spread and his feet rest on a globe. Two panels at the base of the window show Saint Roch with a dog and a flock of sheep and a rural scene of further sheep, rocks, a tree, and a small building. The window is one of three 16th-century windows in the cathedral and was restored in the latter part of the 19th century by Hucher et Fils working in conjunction with the Carmel factory in Mans. The window's main inscription reads "ET SEPARABIT EOS AB INVICEM SICUT; PASTOR SEGRETATOVES AB HOEDIS" and an inscription lower down the window reads "CE VITRAIL A ETE RESTAURE PAR MM HUCHER ET FILS; FAB. DU CARMEL DU MANS 1884".

=== Window of Christ's condemnation and the climb to Golgotha. ===
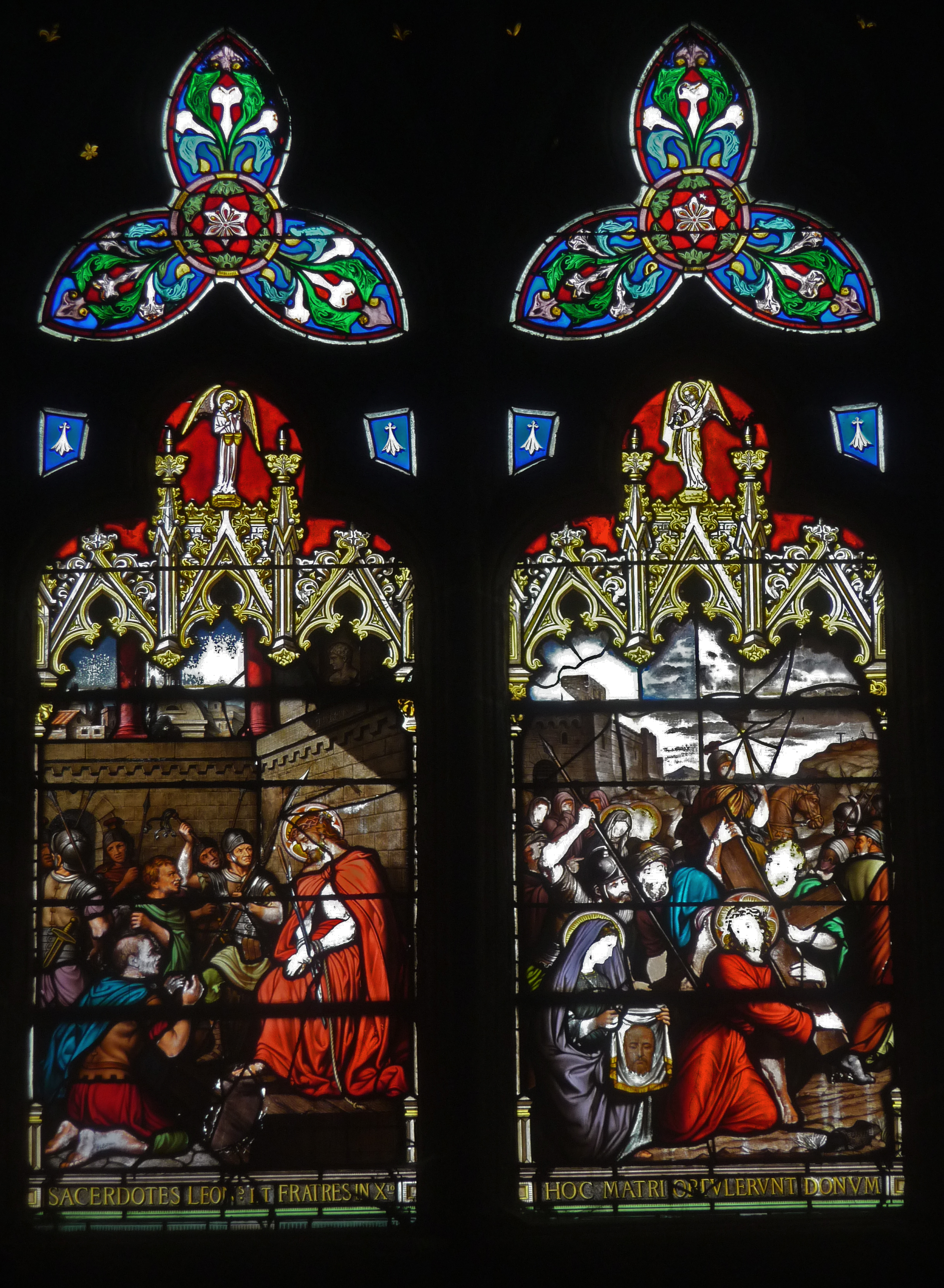
The window dates to 1872 and is by Lobin of Tours. It is inscribed at the base "SACERDOTES LEON... FRAIRES IN X HOC MATRI... FERUNT DONUM". It is part of the "Passion du Christ" series and depicts Christ's condemnation and the climb to Golgotha. Note Veronica with her veil and Jesus struggling to carry the cross.

=== Choir ===
In the choir area are the main altar with its unusual ciborium, the carved oak stalls, the "skull boxes" and six tombs, on the north side those of Monseigneur de Guébriand, Monseigneur de Rieux-Sourdéac and Monseigneur Jean-François de la Marche this by L. Cugnot, and on the south side Monseigneur de Visdelou, Monseigneur Roland de Neufville and Monseigneur Guillaume de Kersauzon

==== The main altar and the ciborium ====
Carved from black Mouroux marble, the altar was commissioned in 1746 from the Mans architect Henry Villars. Flanked by two angels, the altar has a ciborium (containing the Host) which hangs from a carved wooden palm tree symbolising "Victory" and the "Resurrection". This palm tree is between 5 and 6 metres high and is richly decorated with wheat ears, vine leaves and grapes. The palm tree dates to around 1820 to 1823. There are three similar ciboriums in France, at Amiens, Reims and Saint-Germain. Behind the altar is an elaborate tabernacle. Behind the main altar is a carved 16th-century granite altar decorated with trefoil arches and the arms of Hamon Barbier. There is also an elaborate tabernacle in gilded bronze.

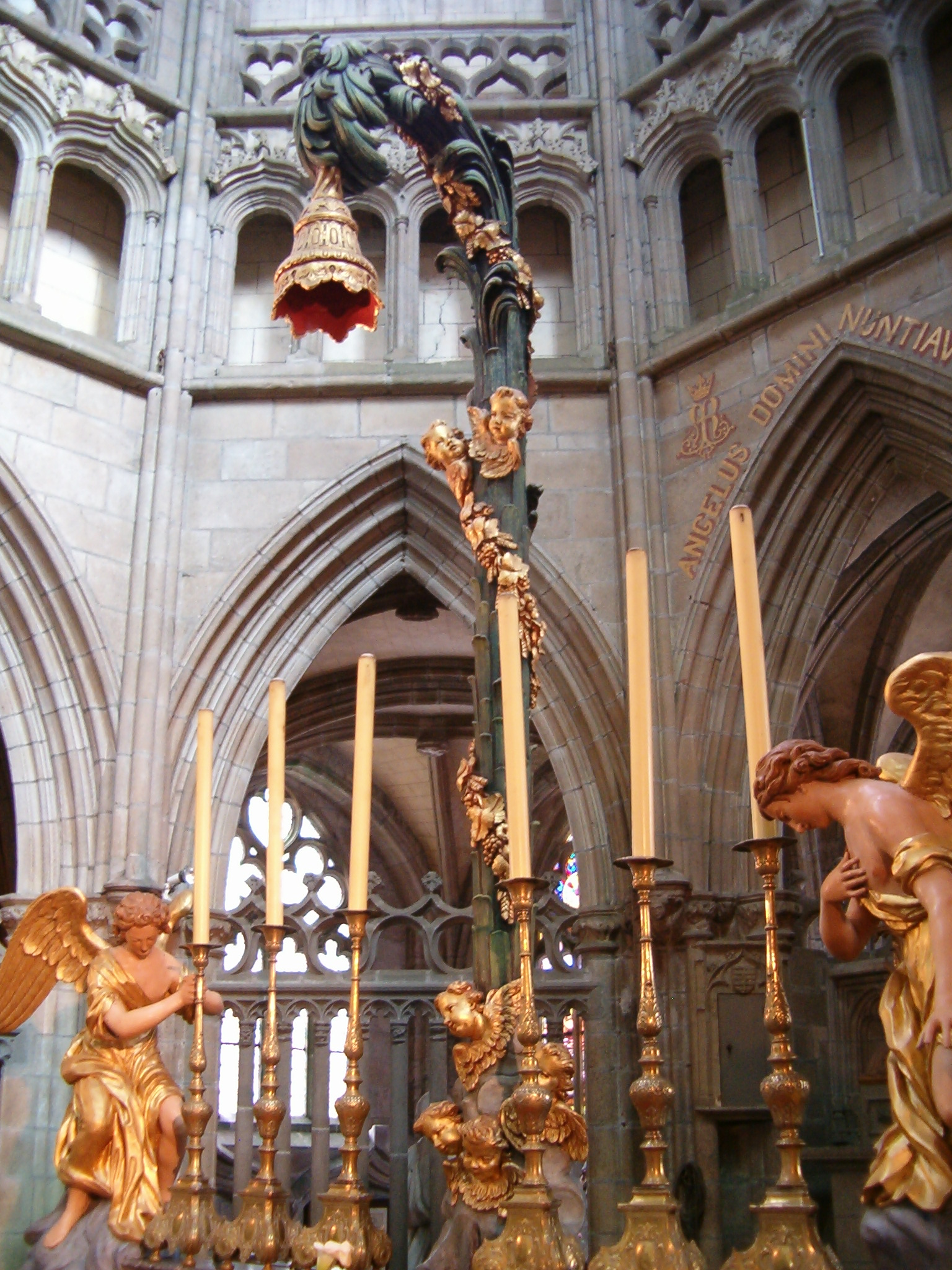
The ciborium. The ciboire itself rests in the flower of the palm tree. The trunk is decorated with cherubs.

The remains of saint Pol are said to be buried at the foot of the main altar under a black marble plaque whose original inscriptions were mutilated during the French revolution, The modern inscription reads "Sepulcrum-sanct Pauli-Civilatis-Leonensium pontificis etvpatroni-obit anno DLXX." Beyond the main altar is a small armoire with the coat of arms of Monseigneur de Keracret.

The upper part of the choir is enclosed by a balustrade in kersanton stone. To the right of the main altar is a double credence. In the choir vaulting are the coats of arms of Monseigneur Ferron who was the Bishop of Léon from 1430 to 1472, the arms of du Chastel, the arms of Monseigneur Validire the Bishop of Léon from 1427 to 1432, the arms of Rohan, the arms of the town of Saint- Pol-de-Leon and the Kérénee of Minihy.

==== Stalls ====
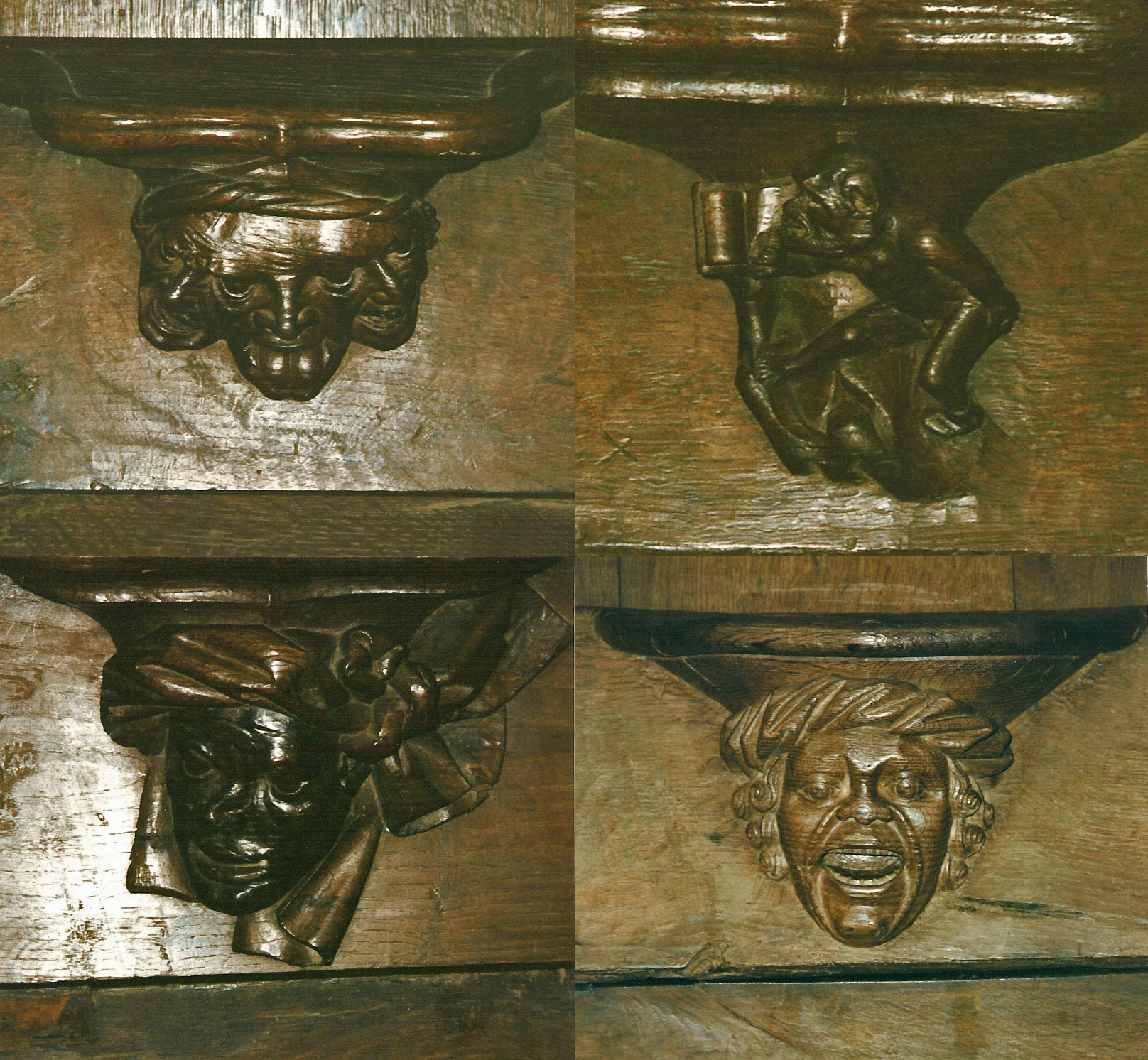
Examples of carvings in the stalls

In the Middle Ages, religious wood carving played an important role in ecclesiastical architecture and those in the cathedral date to the 16th century. There are 33 oak stalls on each side of the choir, 17 in the higher range and 16 lower down and each has been carved with a variety of depictions with representations of foliage, strange animals, dragons and amusing subjects. The first stall on the epistle side bears the arms of Bishop Monseigneur Carman, the Bishop of Léon from 1504 to 1514 and the first stall on the gospel side bears the arms of Bishop Monseigneur Guy Le Clerc, the Bishop of Léon from 1514 to 1523.

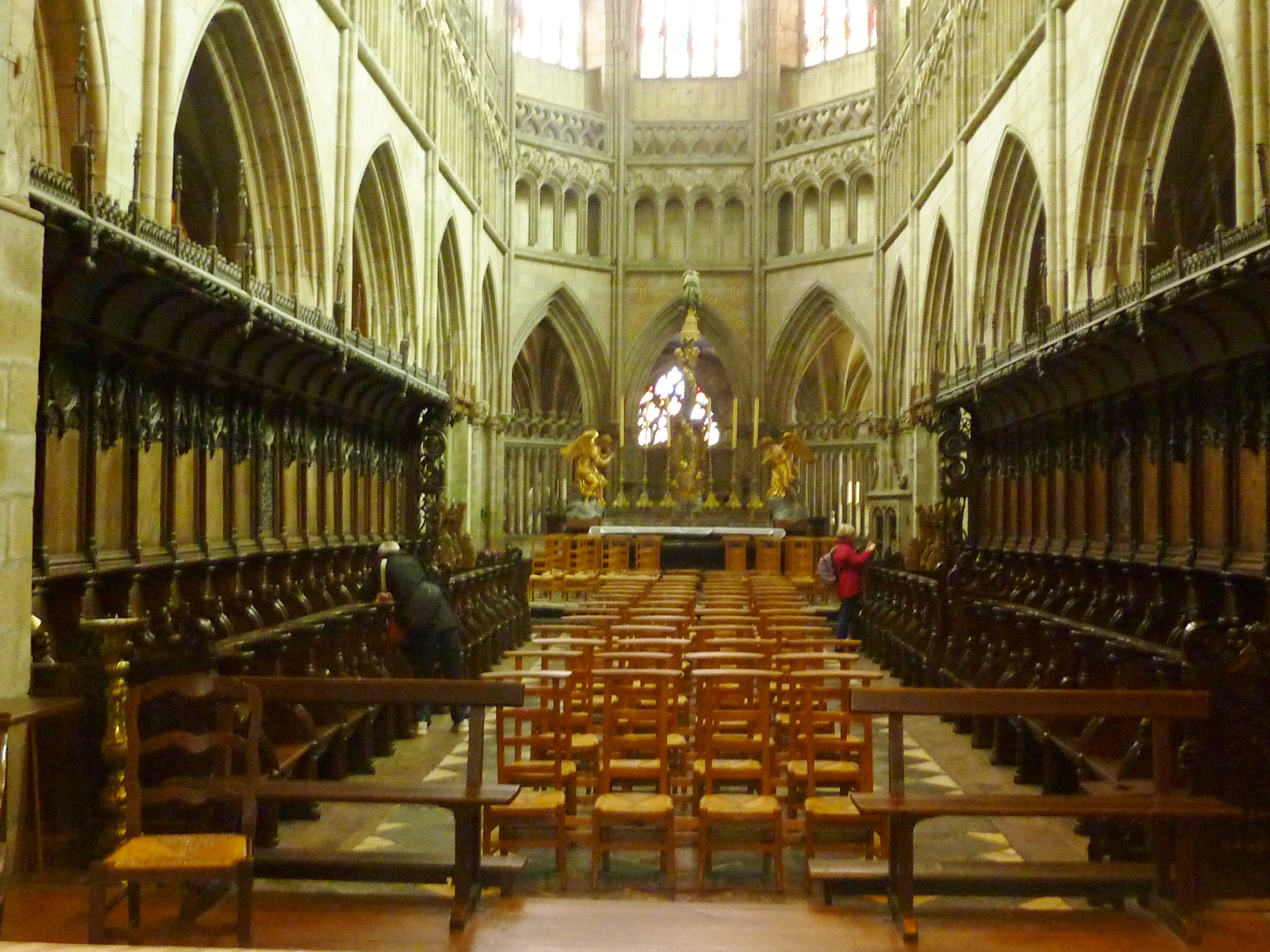
View of the choir area with the high altar and ciborium with angels on either side in the distance and the rows of stalls on either side. Note the elaborately carved canopies above the stalls

Behind the row of stalls on the northern side of the choir are a collection of skull boxes.

==== Skull boxes (39) ====
Called "Les Etagères de la nuit", these 32 wooden "skull boxes" or "boîtes à crâne" are kept behind a grill in the cathedral's ambulatory. Each box holds a skull and the box is inscribed with the name of the person to whom the skull belonged. The box takes the form of a small chapel surmounted by a cross with a trefoil shaped opening. At one time these "skull boxes" were common in Brittany and it was the practice up until the 19th century to remove skeletons from the cemetery after they had been buried for 5 years in order to create space for new remains. The bones were placed in the ossuary or charnel house but the skulls were passed to the deceased's family and many chose to have the skull placed in these chapel shaped boxes and kept on display. The skulls seen on the shelves come from all classes of society from a baker, a health inspector, an infant aged only 6 and a priest to Hamon Barbier the archdeacon of Kéménédilly who owned the Kerjean château.

Les Etagères de la nuit

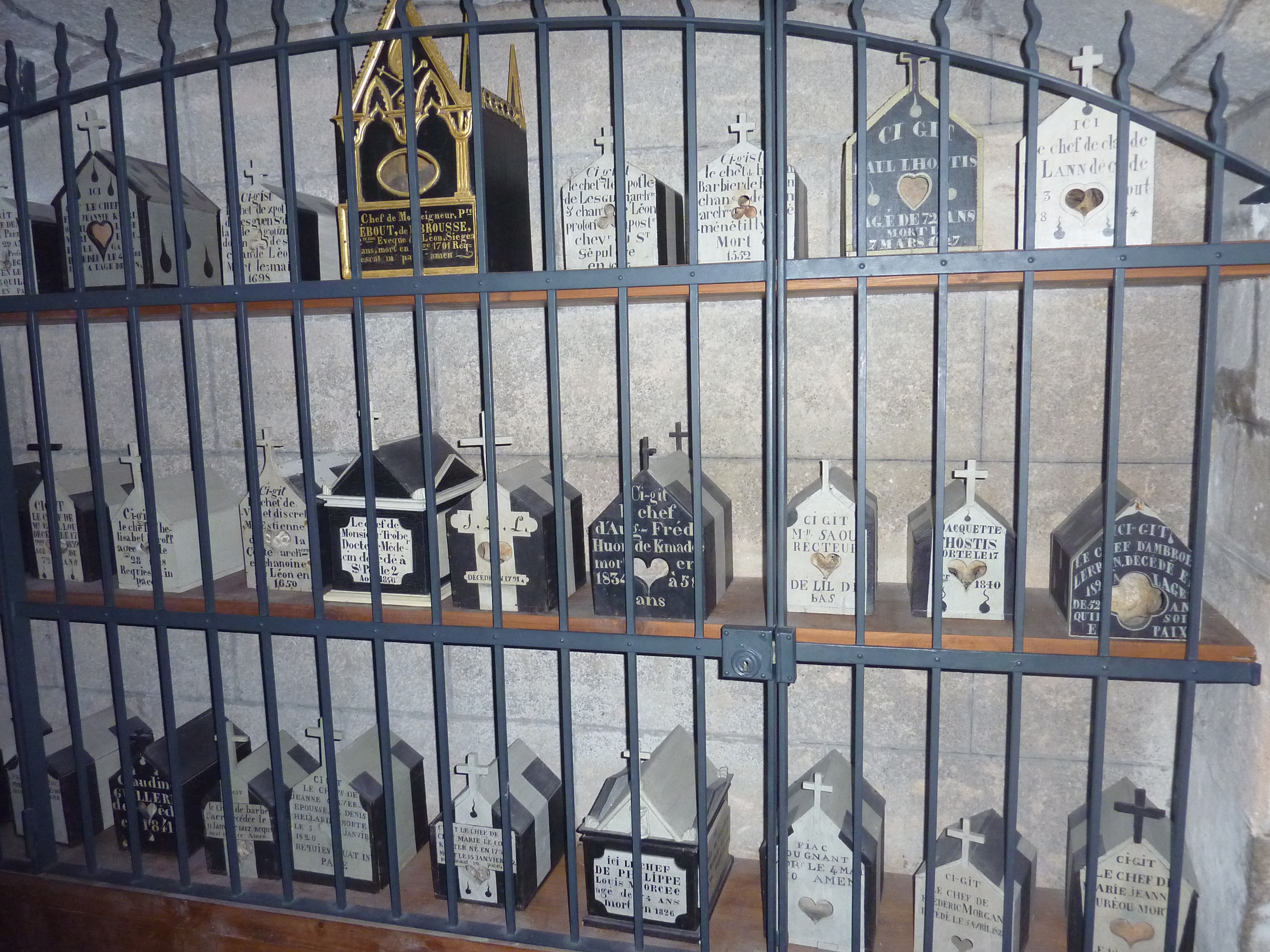
View of skull boxes

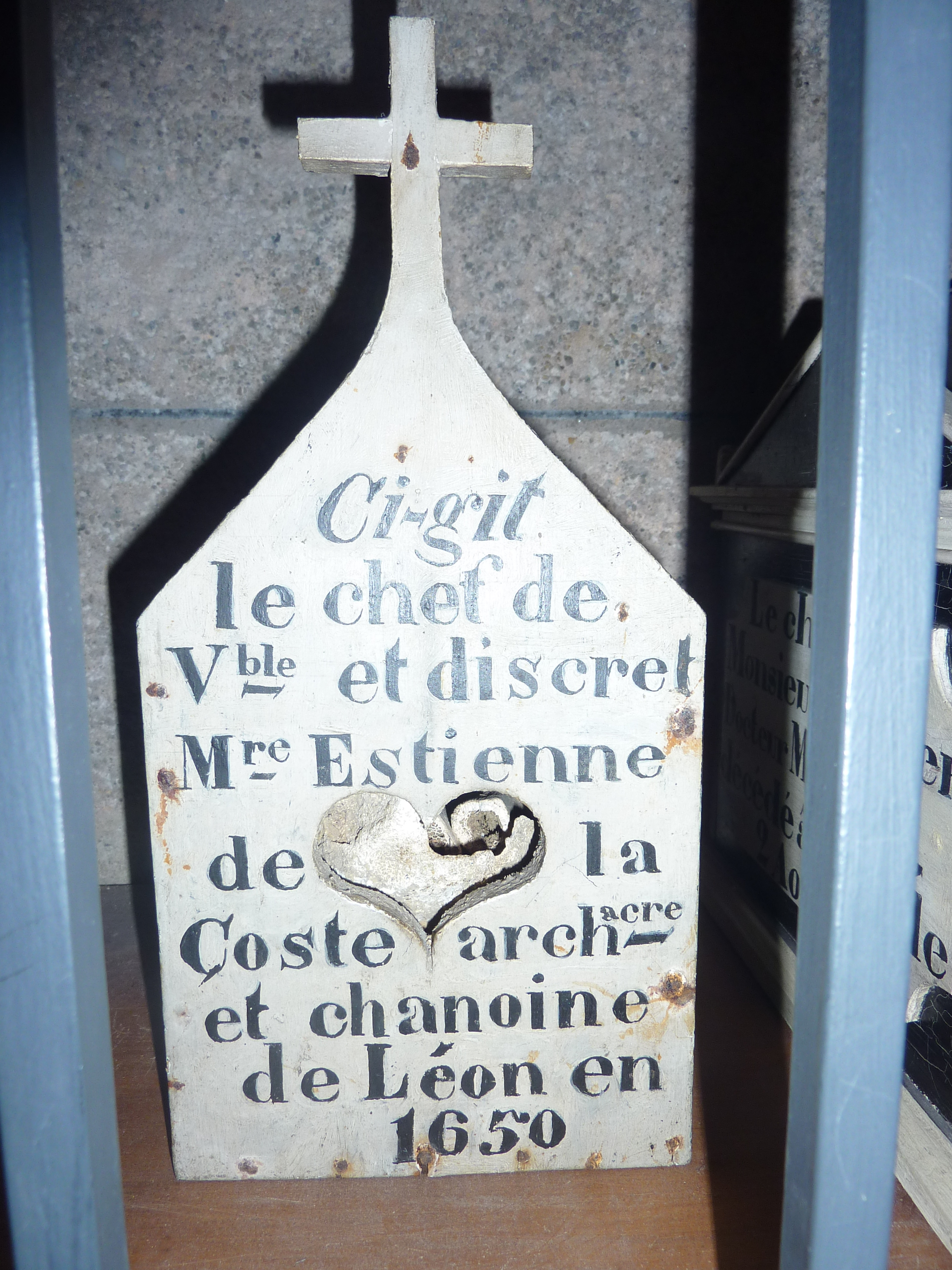
An individual skull box

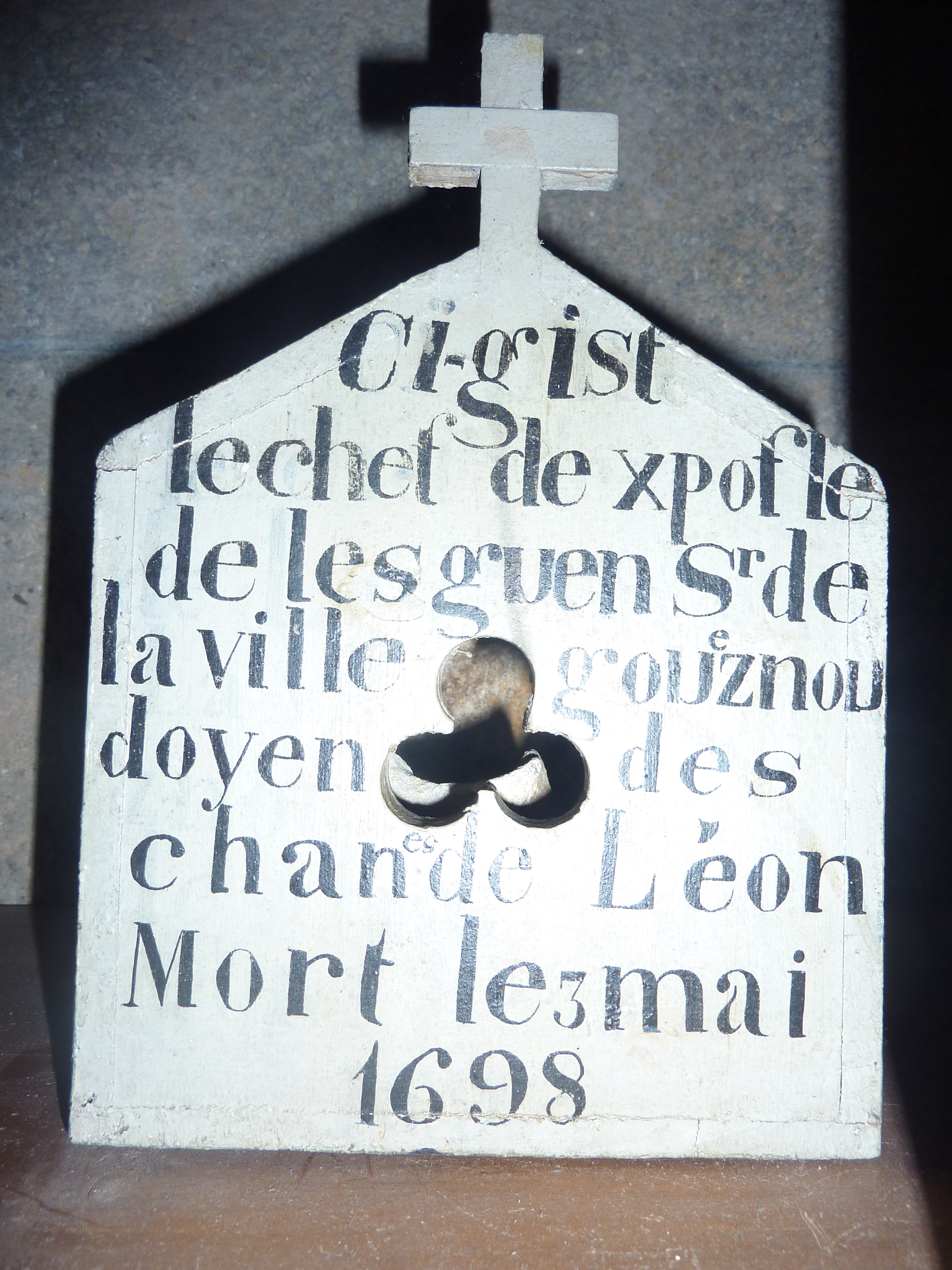
An individual skull box

In the first window of the choir and on the left there is a four-panelled stained glass window. The first panel depicts King Salomon, the king of the Bretons holding his crown ("Salomon, roi des Bretons tenant en main sa couronne"). the second shows Saint Pol passing his stole around the neck of the dragon defeated by Kergonadec'h ("Comment saint Pol terrassa le dragon"). The third portrays the sieur of Kergonadec'h and the fourth Saint Françoise d'Amboise. This window dates to the 16th century and was the work of the Lobin factory in Tours. The window also bears the coat of arms of Françoise d'Amboise.

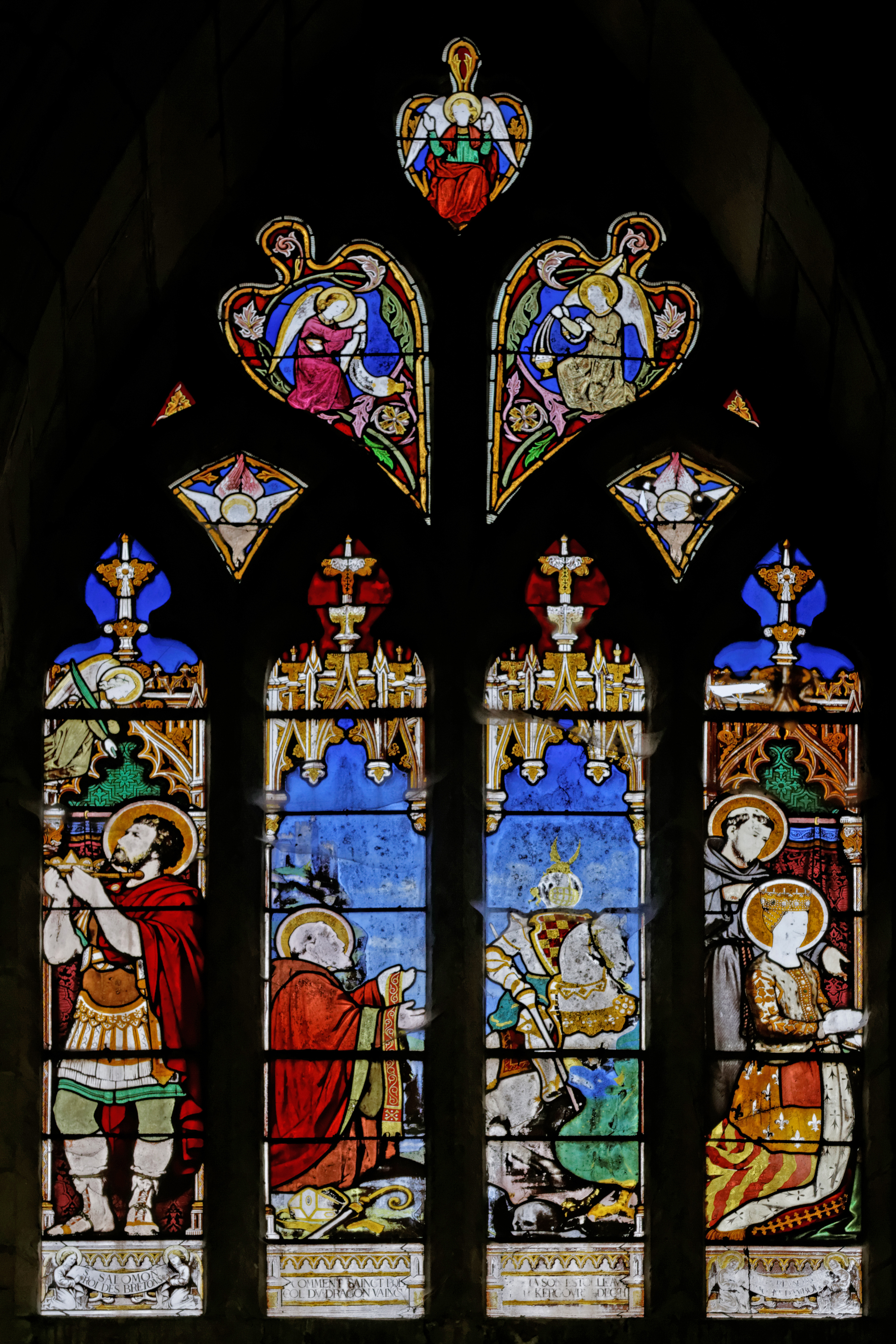
The window depicting Salomon, Saint Pol, the sieur of Kergonadec'h and Françoise d'Amboise

The central window dates to 1868. It comprises four lancets. In the first panel is John the Baptist, in the second and third lancets Jesus is shown with Saint Peter and the fourth panel depicts St. Paul. The arms of Léon appear at the top of the window as well as those of the cathedral chapter. Above the window, two écu are held by two angels. One bears the motto "vexillum regis" and is the insignia of the de la Bouéxière family and the other is the insignia of the du Cleuzious.

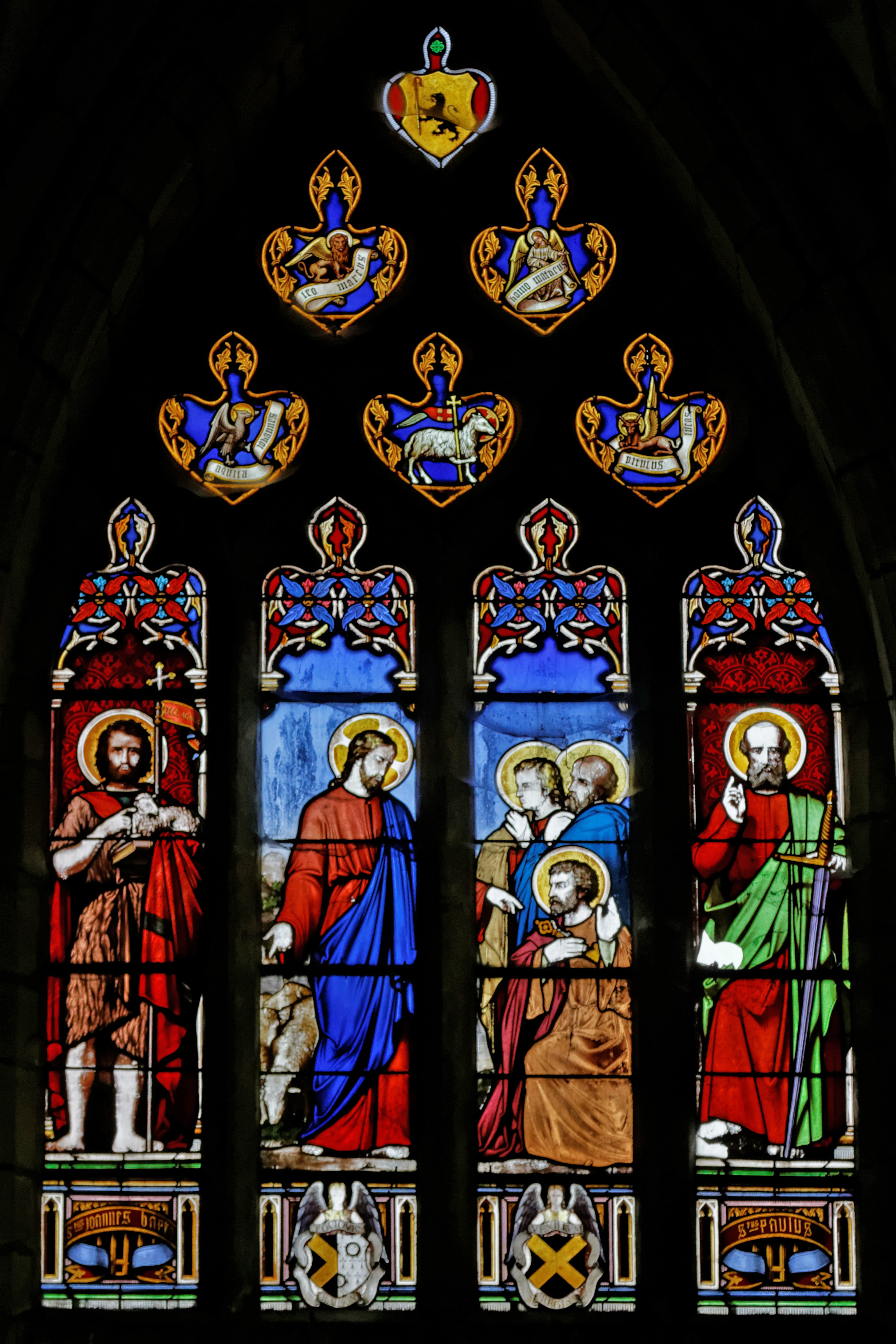
Window depicting John the Baptist, Saint Peter and Saint Paul

The window on the right side depicts Saint Hervé and his dog in the first lancet, in the two central panels is a depiction of Saint Pol kneeling before Childebert and in the fourth lancet we see Saint Yves. This window by Lobin is located to the right of the choir and commemorates Childebert appointing St Pol as bishop of Léon whilst on either side of this scene are depictions of Saint Hervé with his dog and Saint Yves. In the tracery, various angels are shown playing musical instruments.

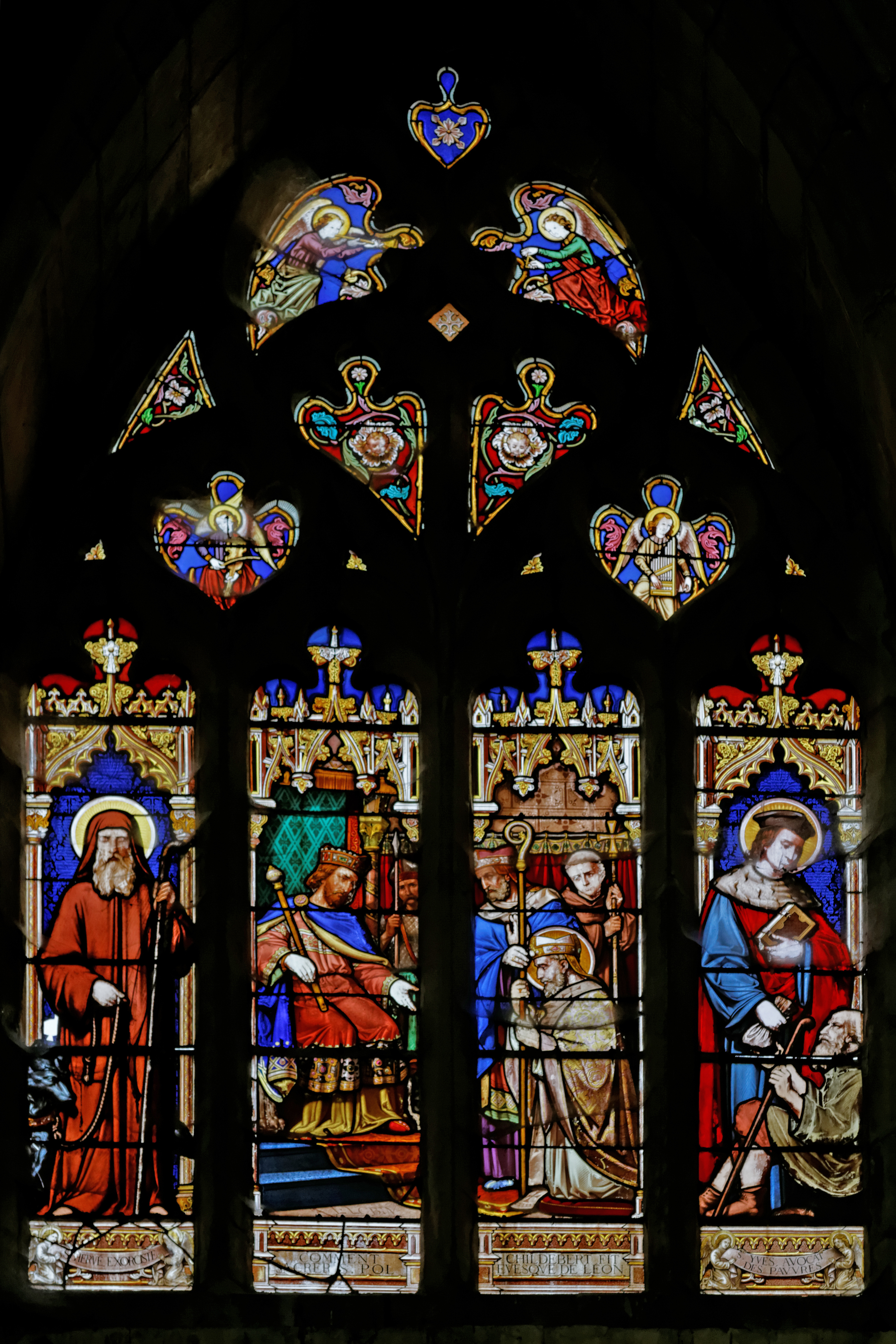
This window by Lobin is located to the right of the choir and the two central lancets commemorate Childebert appointing St Pol bishop of Léon ("Comment Childebert fit sacrer St Pol évêque de Léon"). On either side of this central scene are depictions of Saint Hervé and Saint Yves. In the tracery various angels are shown playing musical instruments

==== The altar known as the "autel communal" ====
This granite altar and altarpiece dates to 1662.

==== The Saint-Sacrement altarpiece ====
This is the work of François Le Pen and dates to 1633.

== Miscellaneous ==
=== Bells ===
The oldest of the cathedral's six bells is that known as "Jaques". It dates to 1568 and came from the foundry of Artus Guimarch in Morlaix. It has a diameter of 1.56 metres and weighs 2,067 kilos.

=== Confessional boxes ===
There are nine confessional boxes in the cathedral. Five of these date to the 17th/18th century.

=== Lectern ===
The cathedral has a 16th-century lectern.

=== Relics ===
The cathedral's relics include Paul Aurélien's Celtic bell, one of the oldest Carolingian bells in Brittany and, in a crystal tube, a thorn held to be from Christ's crown.

== The Great Organ ==
The great organ in the cathedral was built between 1657 and 1660 by the English refugee Robert Dallam. It is composed of 2118 pipes and is a listed monument. It is said that in the design of the organ, Robert was influenced by the organ his father Thomas had built at Cambridge. Dallam had presented himself to the Quimper chapter in 1643 and explained to them that he was a refugee from religious persecution in England. Dallam was given several commissions in Finistère. He subsequently returned to England, where he died in 1665. His two sons stayed in Brittany and became organ manufacturers in the Quimper area.

== Painting of a scene involving the cathedral ==
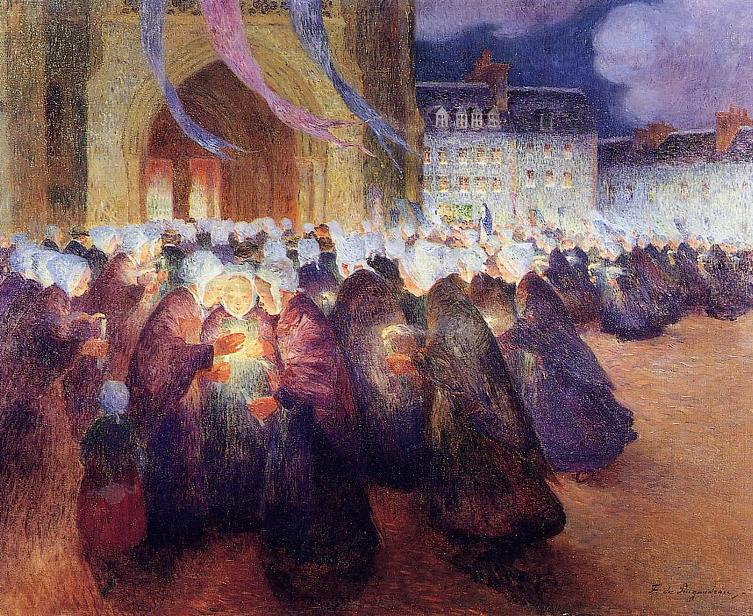
Painting of a nighttime procession at Saint-Paul de Leon

== Tombs and effigies ==
=== Monseigneur Jean Budes de Guébriand (21) ===
This is the work of the Breton sculptor Rene Quillivic and dates to 1935. Jean Budes de Guébriand worked as a missionary in China.

=== Monseigneur de Rieux-Sourdéac (22) ===
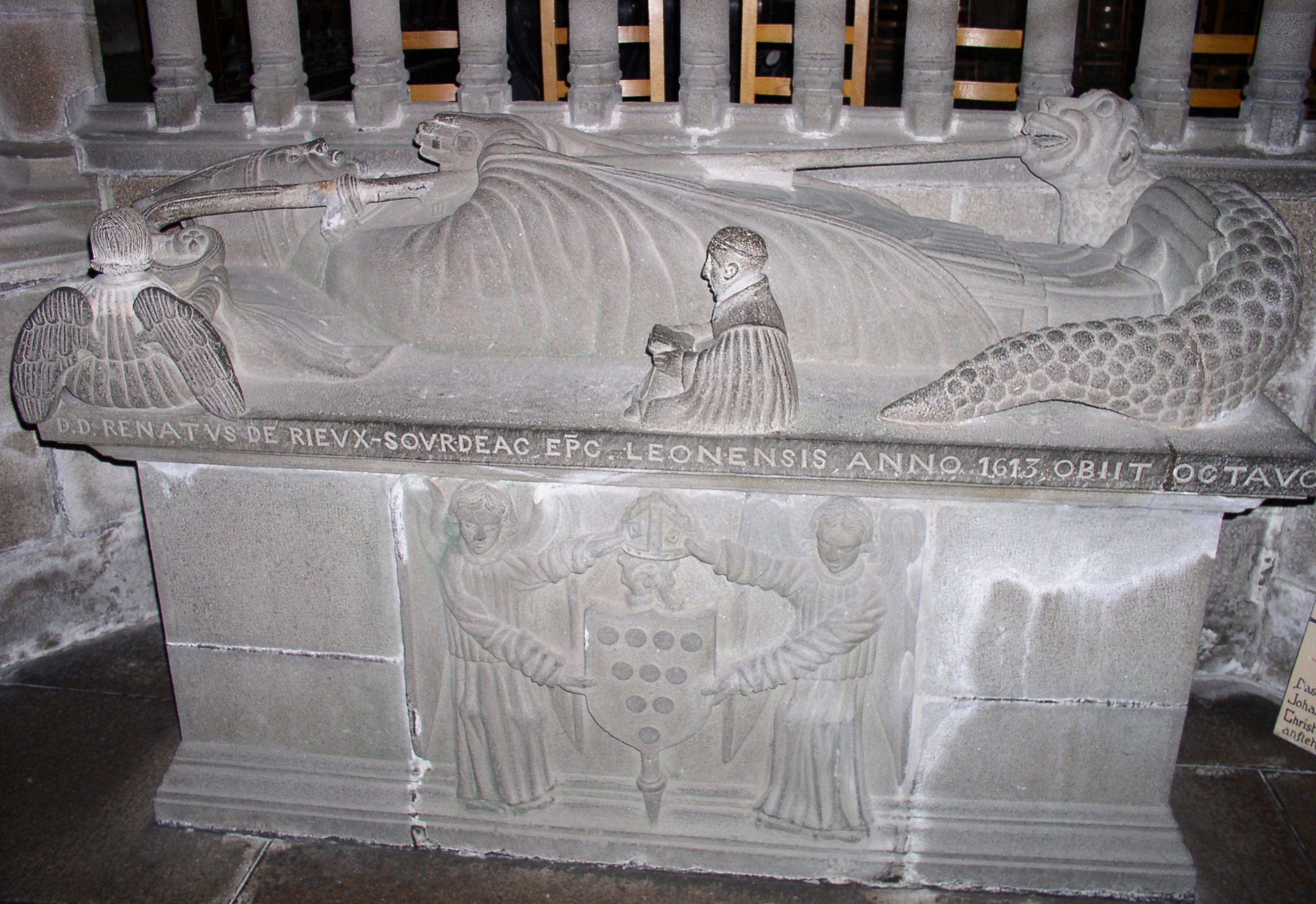
Effigy of Monseigneur de Rieux-Sourdéac

The effigy is carved from kersanton stone. Monseigneur de Rieux-Sourdéac was a Bishop of Leon who died in 1651. De Rieux-Sourdéac wears a bishop's robe and mitre and two angels hold the cushion on which he rests his head. A dragon is depicted at his feet and beside him, a monk is depicted reading. The monk wears the Cistercian habit reminding us that the bishop was also the abbot of the Cistercian community. The de Rieux-Sourdéac écusson appears on the side of the tomb held by two angels. De Rieux was Marie de Médicis' confessor. He also supported the Clarisses and Ursulines and helped to establish their religious orders in Saint Pol and bring education to women.

=== Monseigneur J. F. de la Marche (23). ===
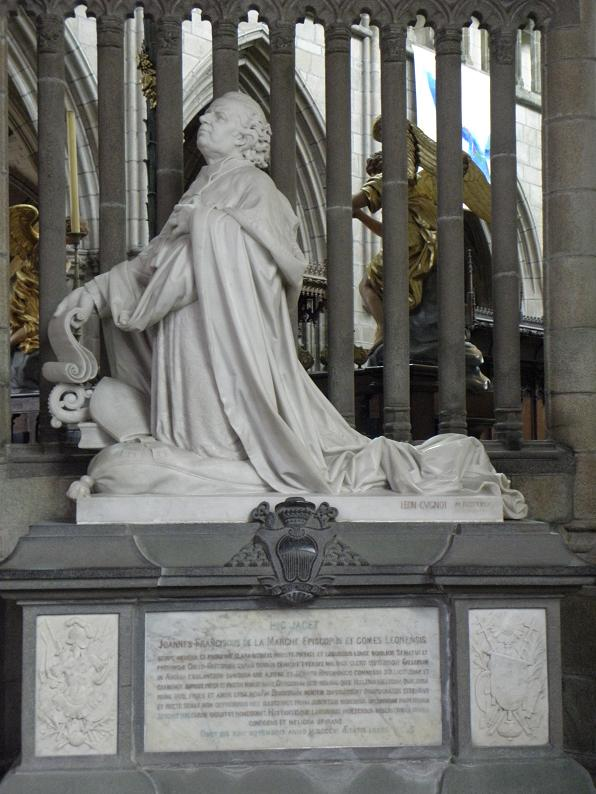
The tomb of Monseigneur de La Marche in Saint-Paul-Aurélien cathedral in Saint-Pol-de-Léon

The next tomb is that of Monseigneur Jean-François de la Marche, who had died in London; his remains were transferred to Saint-Pol de Léon in 1868. This tomb carved from Carrara marble is the work of Léon Cugnot. Cugnot's sculpture depicts the bishop tendering a letter to the National Convention, proposing that he take the place of priests who had been put in prison. His request was ignored, but he never ceased to protest against both the Republic and the Empire. He ignored the Concordat of 1801 issued by Pope Pius VII, which set out to regulate relationships between France and the Holy See. Monseigneur de La Marche introduced the potato to Léon and became known as the "Bishop of potatoes". Before entering the church he served in the Queen's Dragoons as a lieutenant and was injured at the battle of Plaisance in 1746. After the Treaty of Aix-la-Chapelle, he left the army and took orders. In 1764 he became the abbot of Saint-Aubin-des-Bois, and was made the Bishop of Léon in 1772. In 1791 unable to accept the diktats of the Revolution he fled to London and became an "émigré". He was never to return to France and from a house at 10, Little Queen Street in Bloomsbury, he was to organise help for other dissident clerics anxious to escape France. He died in London in 1806 at the age of 77 and his remains were taken to France in 1868. It was de la Marche who donated funds to Saint-Pol-de-Léon to cover the cost of a college built under the direction of the architect Robinet and a large seminary. The sculpture for this tomb was shown by Cugnot at the Paris Salon of 1867. De la Marche's coat of arms also appear on his tomb and the front of the college he had founded.

=== Monseigneur François de Visdelou (33) ===
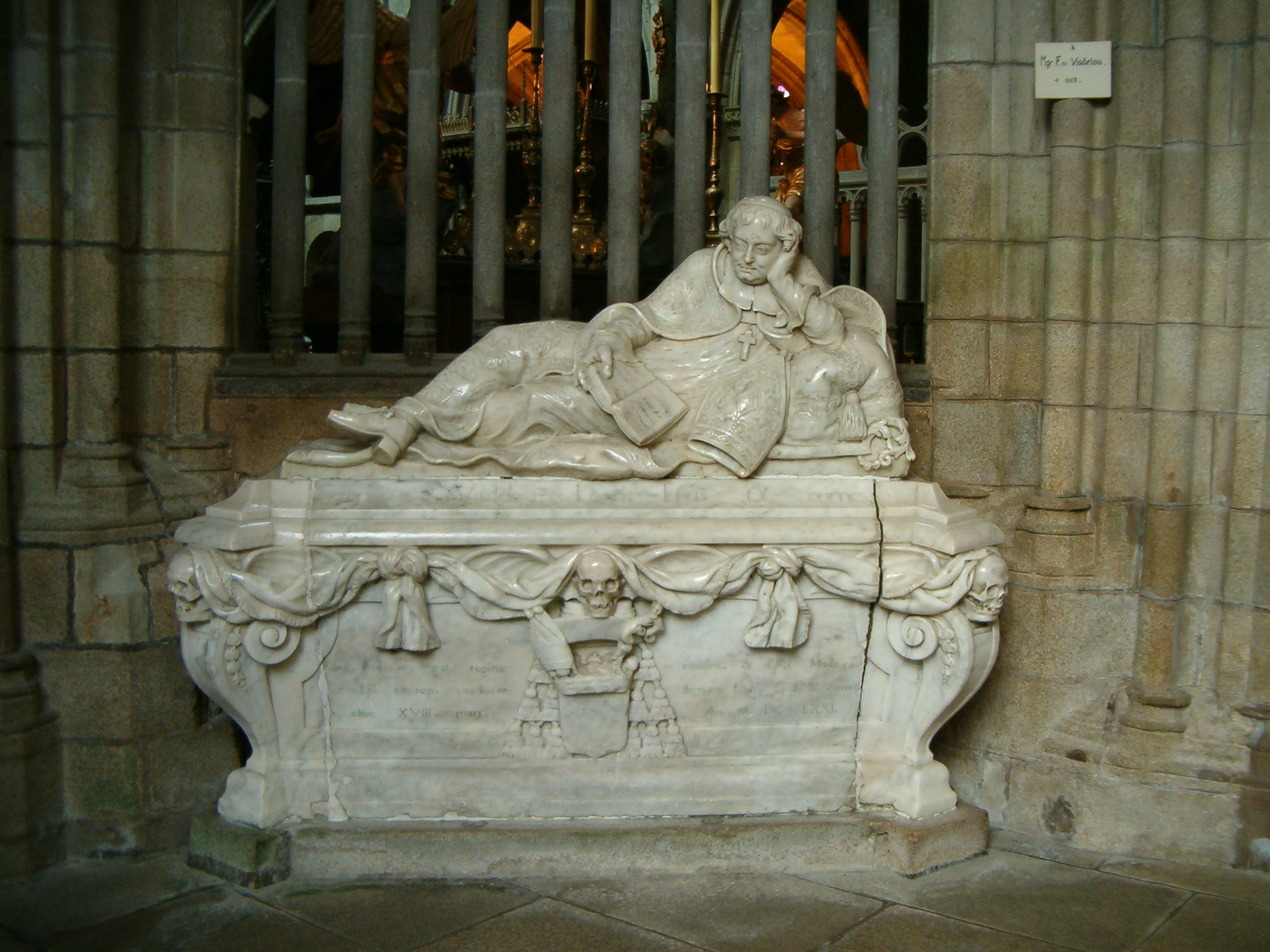
The tomb of Monseigneur François de Visdelou

This white marble tomb, located in the choir area of the cathedral, is that of Monseigneur François de Visdelou. It is the work of the sculptor Nicolas de la Colonge and was executed in 1711. François de Visdelou was the confessor of Anne of Austria, the mother of Louis XIV. The gisant depicts de Visdelou reclining on a couch. The monument was saved from total destruction during the Revolution although the coat of arms was chiselled away and a finger of his right hand bearing his ring was also broken off. François de Visdelou was the Bishop of Léon from 1662 to 1668. There are two inscriptions on the tomb. One reads "Franciscus. Visdelou. Leon. epus.et.comes.Annae Austriacae.Gal.reginae conclonator. et eps.Madurae.Dein.epi.Consop.coadjuter. demun.leonem.eps et comes. Obit XV!!! mart.an.MDCLXXI" and the second inscribed on the mitre reads "NICOLAS DE LA COLONGE MDCCXI".

In the vaulting near Visdelou's tomb is the coat of arms of the Rious of Kerangouez and their motto "Quitte ou double". The window here represents Monseigneur De Rieux. It is positioned above the plaster statue of Saint Pierre. The window here shows De Rieux being reinstated to the Leon episcopacy from which he had been removed. At the bottom of the window is a depiction of the town of St. Pol-de-Leon showing the fortifications, the cathedral and the Kreisker chapel. At the top of the window are the coats of arms of Monseigneur de Neufville, De Kergorlay, whose tomb is located in the chapel, Guéraut du Penhoat and Riou de Kerangouez. There is also an altar dedicated to Saint Matthew here and a door leading to the rue de Petit-Cloître. This door is also known as the Saint Matthew door ("Porte Saint-Mahieu").

=== Monseigneur Roland de Neufville, Bishop of Léon 1562 to 1613 ===
Monseigneur Bishop Roland de Neufville's tomb is located on the south side of the ambulatory and there is also a stained glass window in the cathedral honouring his memory.

Roland de Neufville

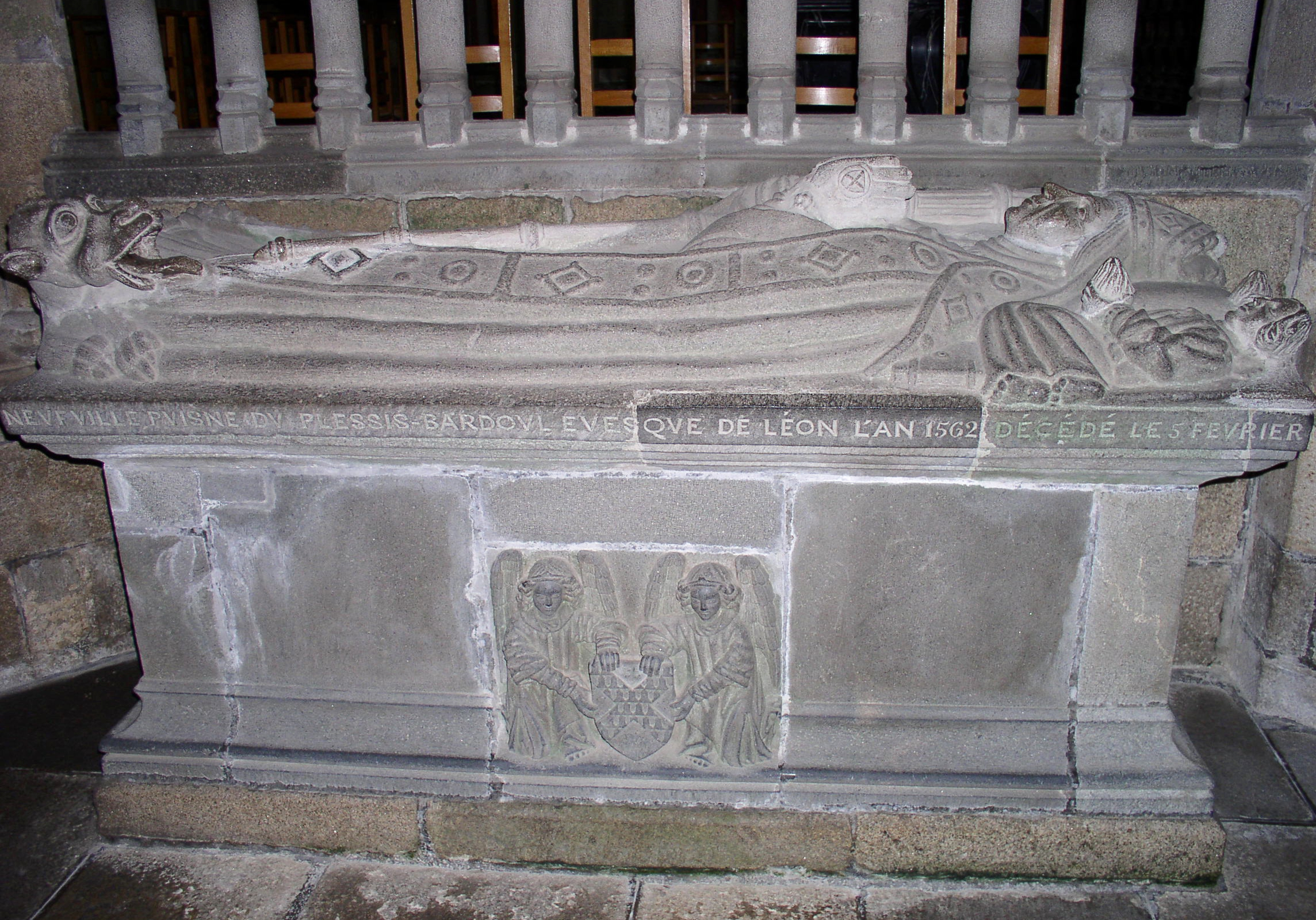
The effigy of Roland de Neufville, Bishop of Léon from 1562 to 1613. He wears a bishop's robe and mitre and the cushion on which he rests his head is supported by two angels. There is a dragon at his feet.

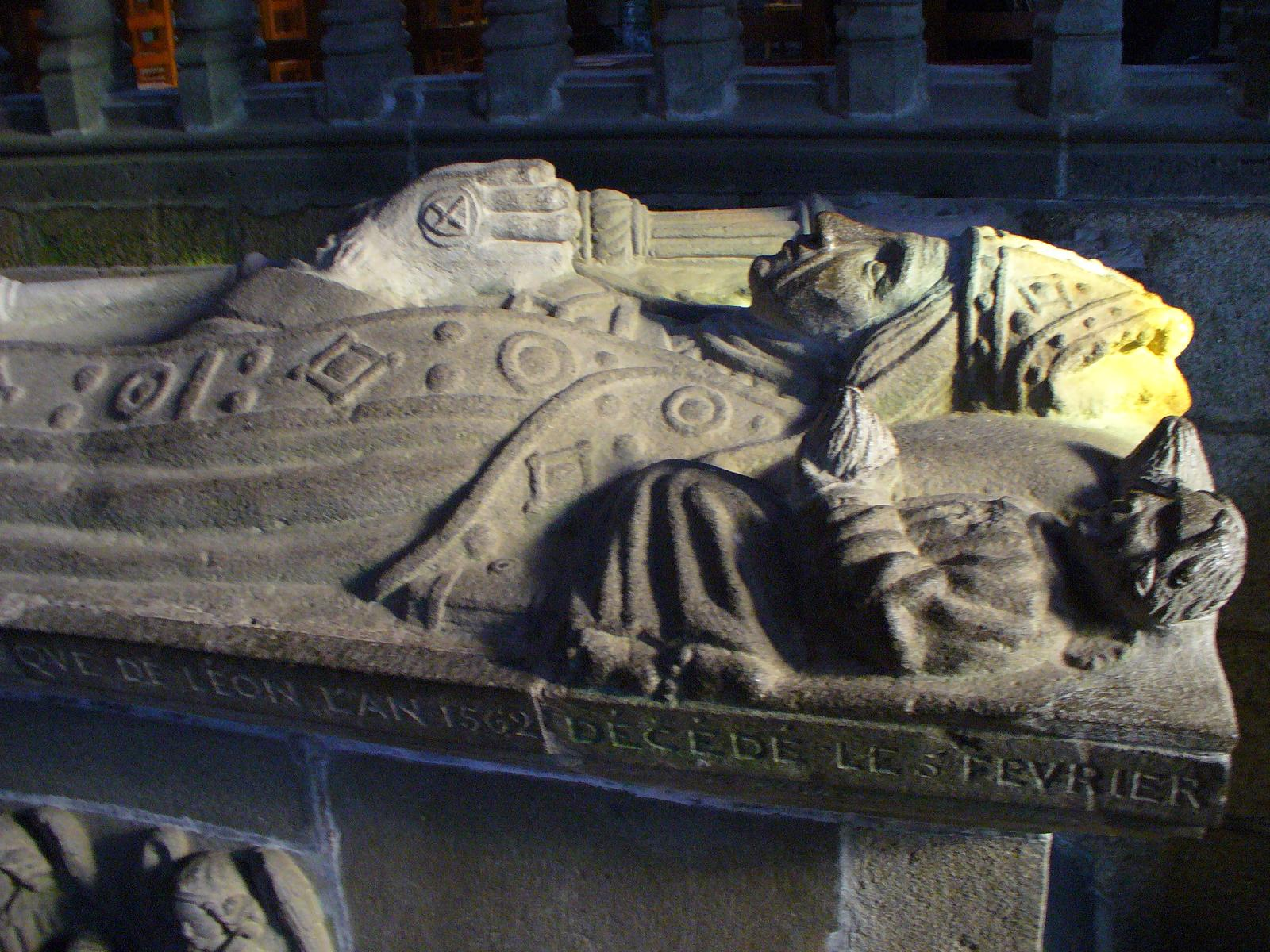
Another view of the effigy of Roland de Neufville

His tomb is marked by a effigy carved from granite. The inscription reads "NEVFVILLE PVISNE DV PLESSIS, BARDOVL, EVESQUE DE LEON L'AN 1562, DECEDE LE 5 FEVRIER 1613". The tomb is also decorated with two angels holding a shield (ecusson) bearing the Neufville coat of arms.

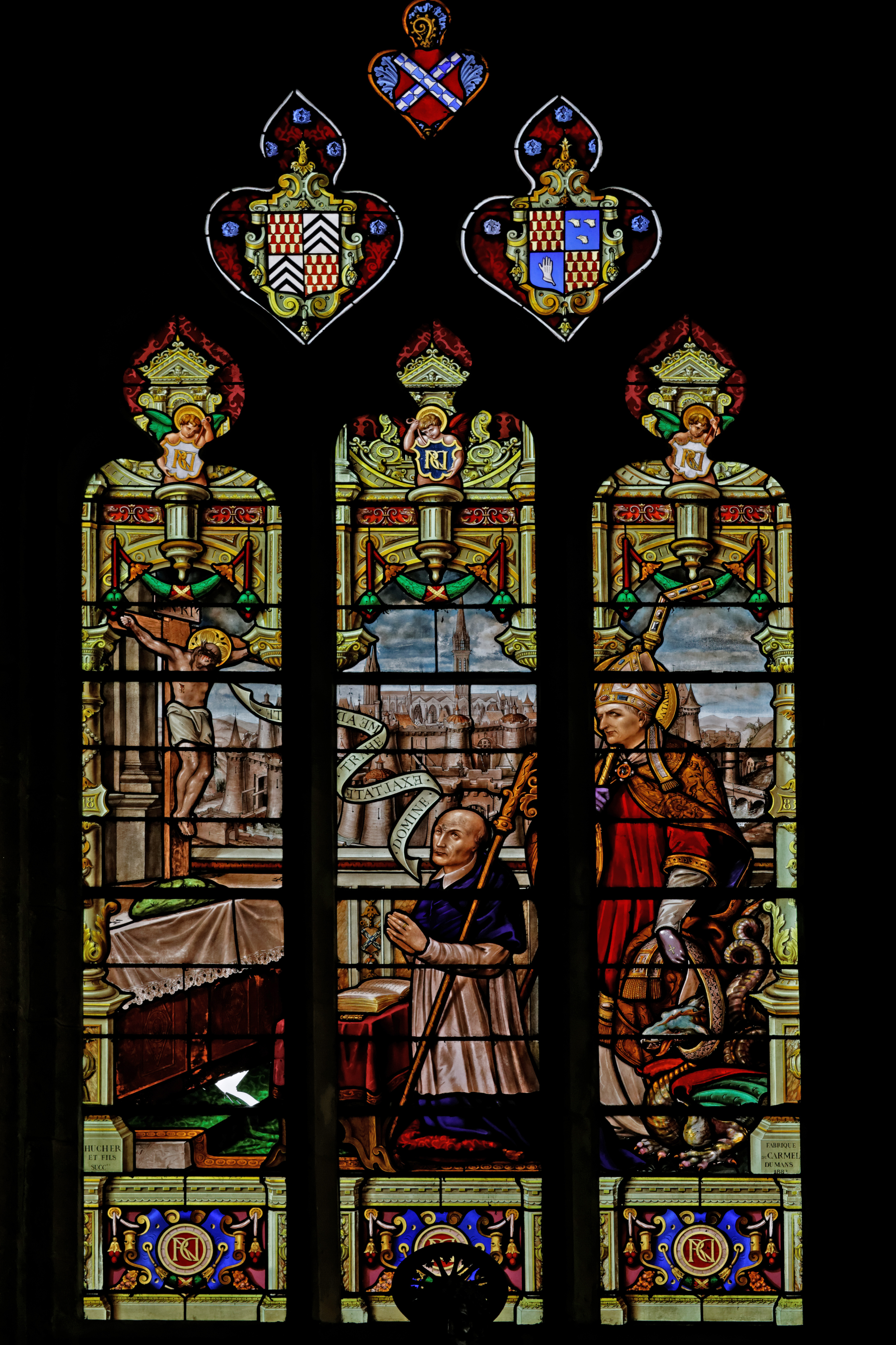
The window honouring Roland de Neufville. Dating to 1883 the stained glass window is by Lobin working with the Carmel factory in Mans. The likeness of Monseigneur de Neufville is based on an illumination depicting the bishop in a missal held in Lyon.

Just by the tomb of Monseigneur de Neufville on the epistle side of the choir there is the tomb of Pierre le Neboux de la Brosse who served as the Bishop of Léon from 1671 to 1701.

=== Monseigneur Guillaume de Kersauzon ===
This tomb is located against the south wall of the choir. It bears the de Kersauzon coat of arms and the inscription: "HIC JACET IN PACE GUILLELMUS DE KERSAUZON EPS LEON.QUI.CAPELLAE.SANCTI.MARTINI.IN HAC ECCLESIAE.CATHLI.FUNDAMENTA LOCAVIT OBIIT.A.DNIU.MCCCXXVII." The tomb is carved from white stone, De Kersauzon wears his mitre and his head rests on a cushion. At his feet is a depiction of the St. Pol dragon.

== Sources ==
- (in French) Cathédrales de la France: Saint-Pol-de-Léon
- (in English) Pictures
- "Sculpteurs sur pierre en Basse-Bretagne" by Emmanuelle Le Seac'h. Art Société. Published by Presses Universitaires de Rennes in 2014. This splendid book was used in connection with the Kreisker porch and the work by the Atelier du Folgoët.
- "Cathédrales et Basiliques de Bretagne" with text by Chantal Leroy and Dominique de La Rivière, a preface by Yves-Pascal Castel and photographs by David Bordes. Published in 2009 by Éditions creme.
- "Saint-Pol-de-Léon" by Lucien Th. Lecureux. Published in 1925 as one of the "Petites Monographies des Grands Édifices de la France".
- "Saint-Pol-de-Léon" by Yves-P. Castel. Published by Ouestfrance in Rennes in 1980.
- The website https://web.archive.org/web/20110217055635/http://fr.topic-topos.com.
- The website http://www.infobretagne.com.
- "La Cathédrale de Saint-Pol et Le Minihy Leon". A work of 1901 by Paul Malo Theophile Peyron.
- René Couffon. Alfred Le Bars. "Répertoire des églises et chapelles du diocèse de Quimper et de Léon". See http://diocese-quimper.fr/fr/archives/story/1164/nouveau-repertoire-des-eglises-et-chapelles-couffon
- J. Clec'h "Visite de la Cathédrale de Saint-Pol-de-Léon et de la chapelle de N.D. du Kreisker". Morlaix, 1907.
