= Dallam family =

English family of organ builders

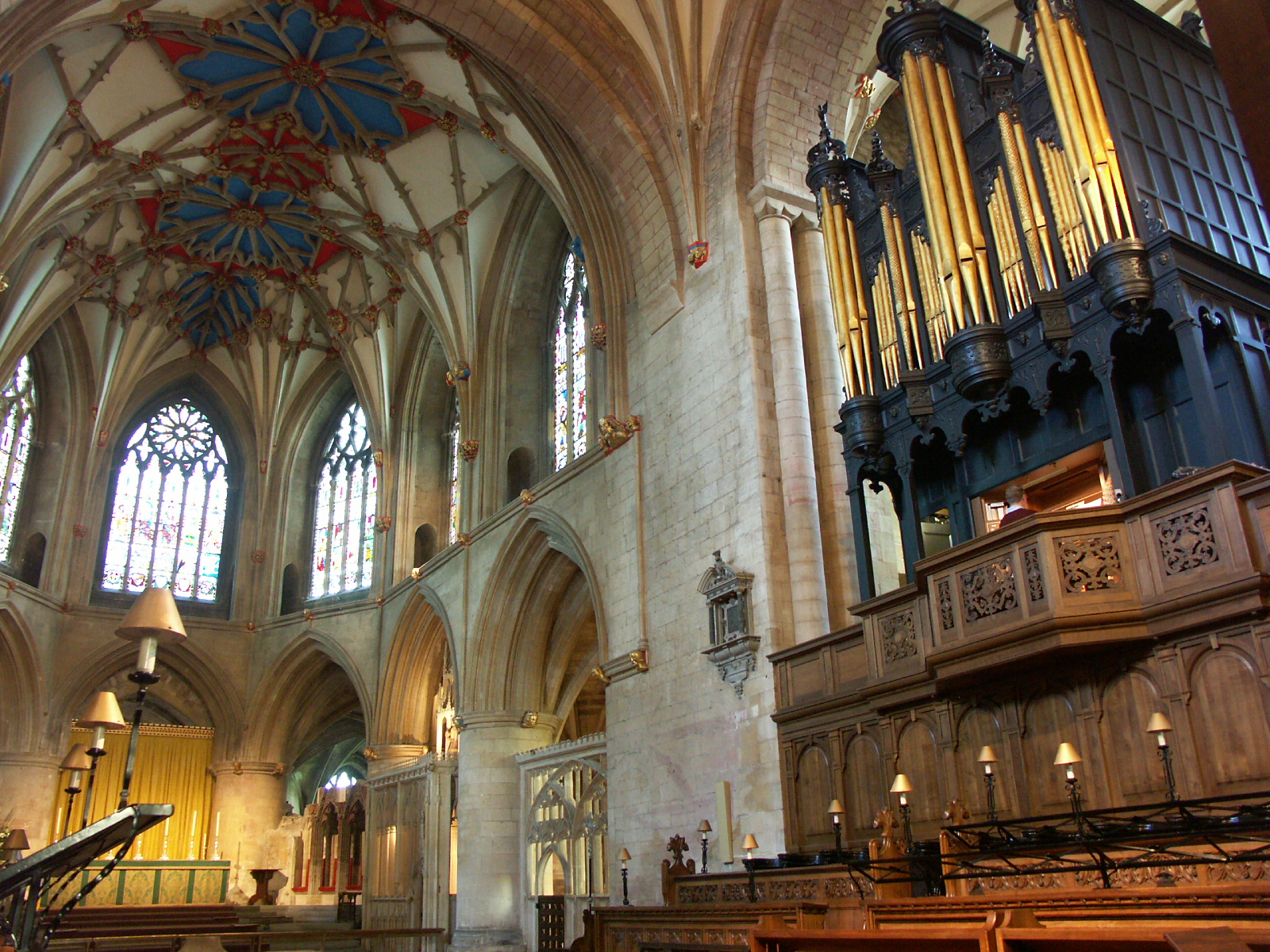
Organ of Tewkesbury Abbey. This instrument was originally built by Robert Dallam before the Civil War.

Dallam was the surname of a family of English organ builders, active in England and Brittany. The first known member of the family, Thomas Dallam, originated from Dallam in Lancashire.

== Thomas Dallam I ==
The first Thomas Dallam (1575; after 1620) left Lancashire, to establish himself in London where he became a member of the Blacksmiths' Company. During 1599 and 1600 he went on a voyage from London to Constantinople in order to deliver an organ to the sultan Mehmet III.

After his return to England Thomas Dallam married and built many important organs, including that of King's College Chapel, Cambridge.

== Robert Dallam ==
Thomas Dallam's son Robert Dallam (born ca. 1602) became an important organ builder. His father died around 1630 and the first organ Robert made on his own may be the Milton Organ of Tewkesbury Abbey.

Robert and his family relocated to Brittany during the English Commonwealth, when it was impossible to pursue a career as an organ builder in England. In 1660, following the restoration of the monarchy, Robert Dallam and other members of the family returned to England. Robert and his sons Ralph and George built an organ for St George's Chapel, Windsor Castle, which had been damaged during the civil war. Robert died while completing his organ at New College, Oxford.

== Thomas Dallam II ==
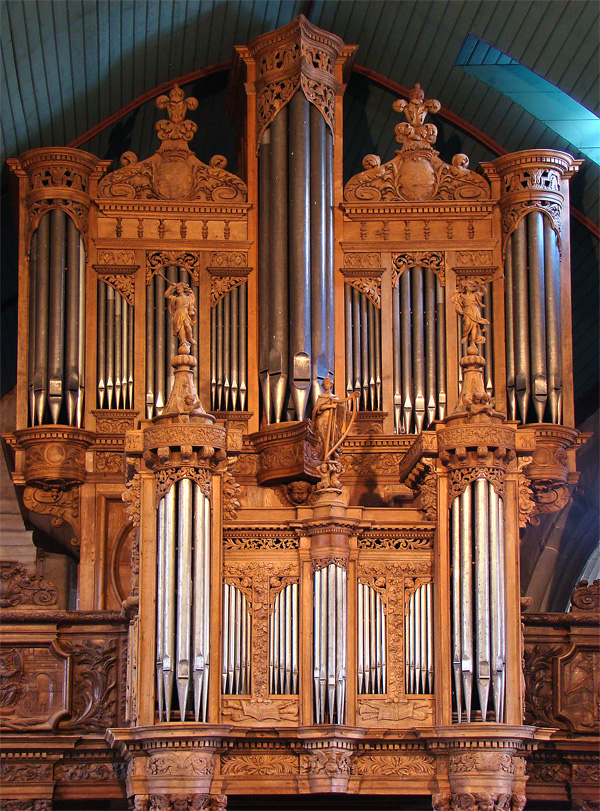
Organ by Thomas Dallam II at Guimiliau (1677).

Robert's eldest son was called Thomas and was born around 1630. As a child, he moved to France with his family. Although his father returned to England in 1660, Thomas remained in France building organs, several of which have been preserved in more or less their original condition. His children included Toussaint Dallam who was an organ builder.

== Location of Dallam organs ==
=== England ===
- Tewkesbury Abbey. This church has an organ with a case by Robert Dallam dated to the 1630s.

=== France ===
- Ergué-Gabéric. This church has an organ by Thomas Dallam II and his son Toussaint Dallam dated 1680.
- Guimiliau. This church has an organ by Thomas Dallam II.
- Lanvellec. This church has an organ constructed by Robert Dallam (moved from the church of Plestin les Grèves).
- Ploujean. This church has an organ by Thomas Dallam II. Dallam's contribution was the pipework rather than the wooden case.
- Saint-Pol-de-Léon. Saint Paul Aurélien cathedral has an organ by Robert Dallam.

== See also ==
- Renatus Harris
