= Kreisker chapel =

Chapel located in Finistère, France

Notre Dame du Kreisker
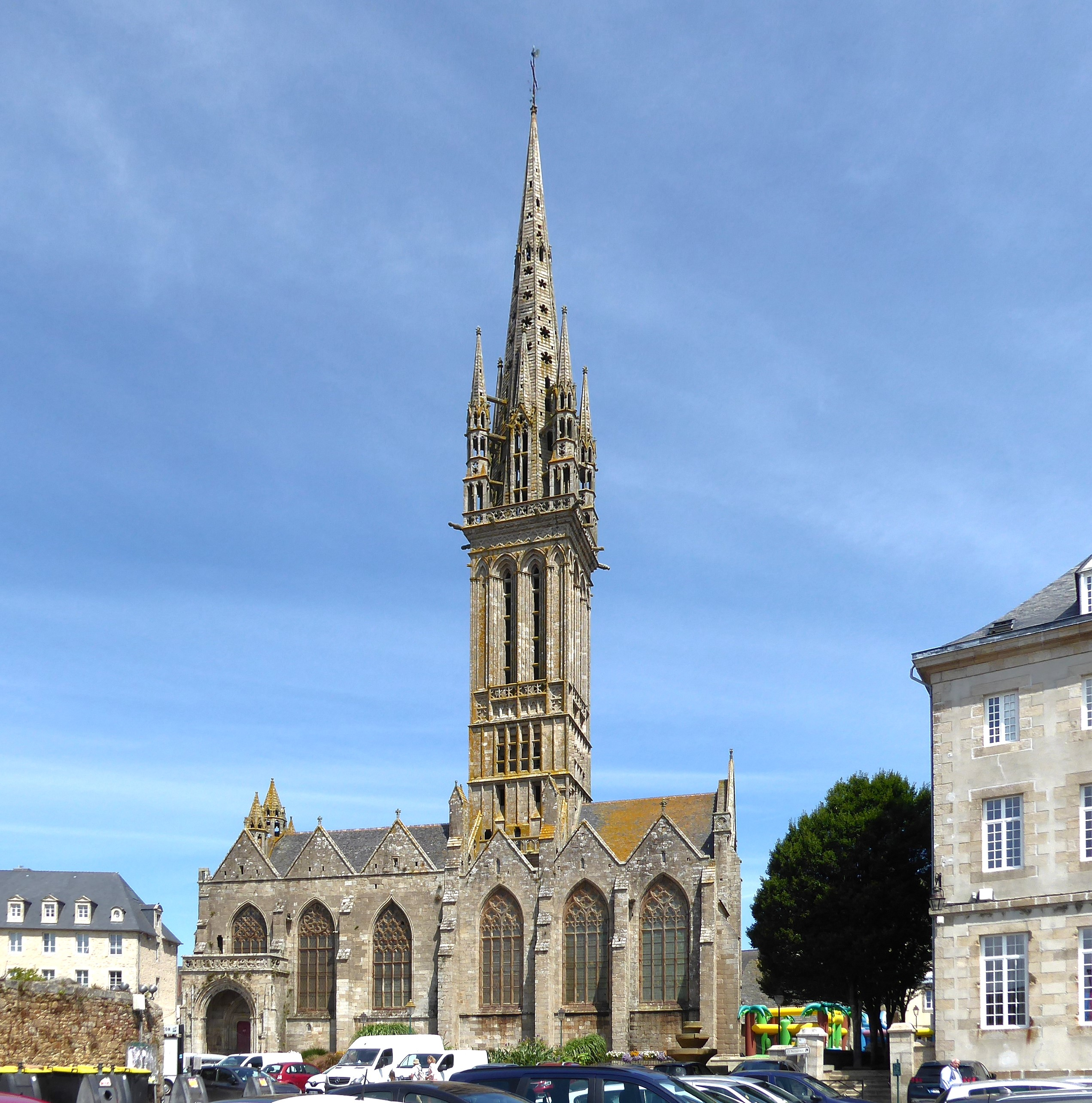
- The Kreisker

Religion
- Affiliation: Roman Catholic
- Ecclesiastical or organisational status: Chapel

Location
- Location: Saint-Pol-de-Léon, Brittany, France
- Interactive map of Notre Dame du Kreisker
- Coordinates: 48°40′58″N 03°59′12″W

Architecture
- Type: church
- Style: Gothic
- Groundbreaking: 14th
- Completed: 15th

Specifications
- Height (max): 78m
- Materials: Granite
- Monument historique
- Official name: Eglise Notre-Dame du Kreisker
- Designated: 1840
- Reference no.: PA00090427

The Notre-Dame du Kreisker chapel (Breton: Chapel Itron-Varia ar C'hreiz-kêr; French: Chapelle Notre-Dame du Kreisker) is a Roman Catholic chapel in Saint-Pol-de-Léon in Brittany, France. The 78-metre (256 ft) tower of the "Chapelle du Kreisker" is the highest in Brittany. The word Kreisker means the downtown.

Built in the 14th and 15th centuries on the site of an ancient place of worship, it is one of the major works of Breton religious architecture and a testimony of the flourishing economy of the town in the 15th century. An essential coastal landmark for navigation, it was for that reason restored and thus saved from destruction on Napoleon’s order in 1807. There is a striking view from the top (169 steps).

== History ==
The origin of the chapel goes back to the 6th century. A young linen maid who had worked on a holiday in the honour of the Virgin despite Saint Kirec's disapproval, became suddenly completely paralysed. After her repentance the saint healed her and she gave him her house to be converted into a chapel. The chapel was called "Kreis-Ker" because it was located in the middle of a village, in the inner suburb of St Pol de Léon. It is likely that the first chapel was made of wood and it must not have withstood the ravages of the Normans in the 9th century.

Tradition relates that the English, having burnt the town in 1375, rebuilt the Kreisker. Some architectural features such as the "perpendicular style" at the base of the tower are obvious signs of an influence from across the Channel. Settled on a long-term basis in St Pol de Léon after the war of succession of Brittany, the English converted the tower into a look-out post turned towards the sea and the surrounding countryside. A guardroom in the north porch is a virtually intact example of traditional accommodation at the end of the 14th century.

Between 1439 and 1472, after the departure of the English, the tower was crowned by a superb spire and the building slightly modified. The steeple was saved from demolition by Napoléon in 1807 because of its usefulness for navigation. The city council used the Kreisker as an assembly room throughout the Middle Ages until the Revolution.

The chapel and its tower continue to dominate the city skyline. Norman and British influences are visible on the architecture of this classified historic monument.

A World War I era charity art-postcard miniature painting of the chapel & street scene (east side); 1916

== Description ==
The tower rests on four 3.2-metre (10 ft) pillars which appear too slight to support the weight. A magnificent specimen of "clocher à jour", the granite spire is an octagon pierced by 80 openings which reduce wind resistance. The flamboyant-style north porch is more traditional than the south porch.

A staircase of 169 steps gives access in July and August to a balustrated balcony with extensive views.

West side

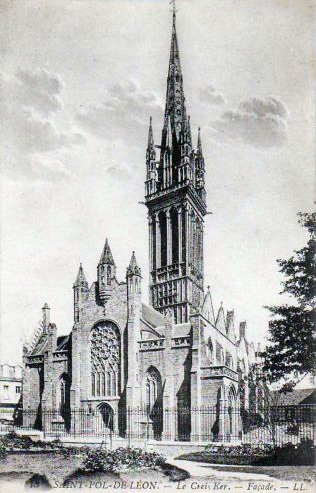
End 19th century

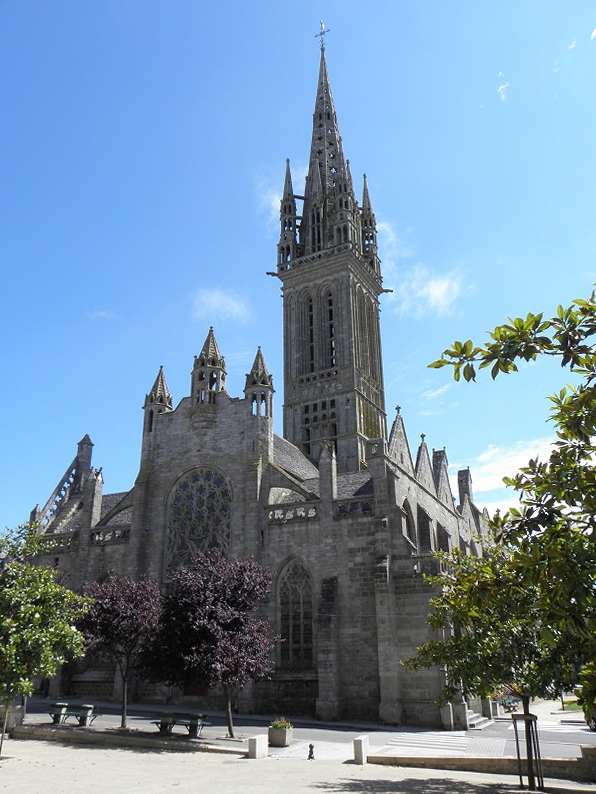
Early 21st century

The main features of the Kreisker chapel are:

=== The north portal ===
The north portal and porch are carved granite. The triangular pediment over the porch contained carvings of the coats of arms of many of the chapel's benefactors, but these were chiseled away during the French Revolution. At the top of the porch is a statue of the Virgin Mary with child dating from the 15th century. The external arcade of the porch is decorated with ten statuettes depicting bearded patriarchs. In the voussoirs are carvings of vine leaves, thistles and cabbages. Inside the porch are five niches on either side but no statues were ever completed to fill them. The porch leads to two doors giving entry to the cathedral and these are decorated with carvings of different kinds of foliage, monsters, domestic animals, griffons and chimeras.

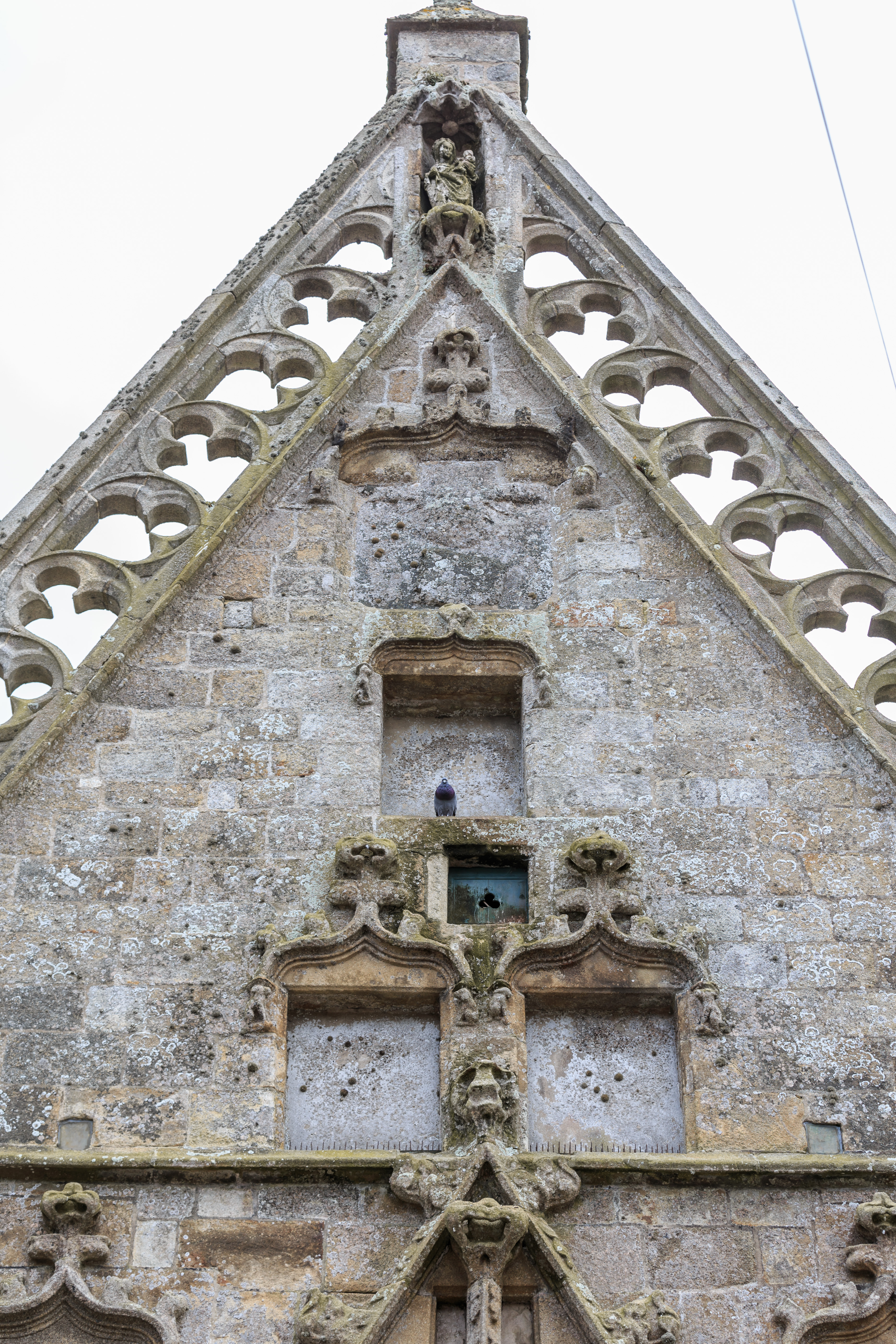
View of the statue of the Virgin Mary and child at the top of the north porch

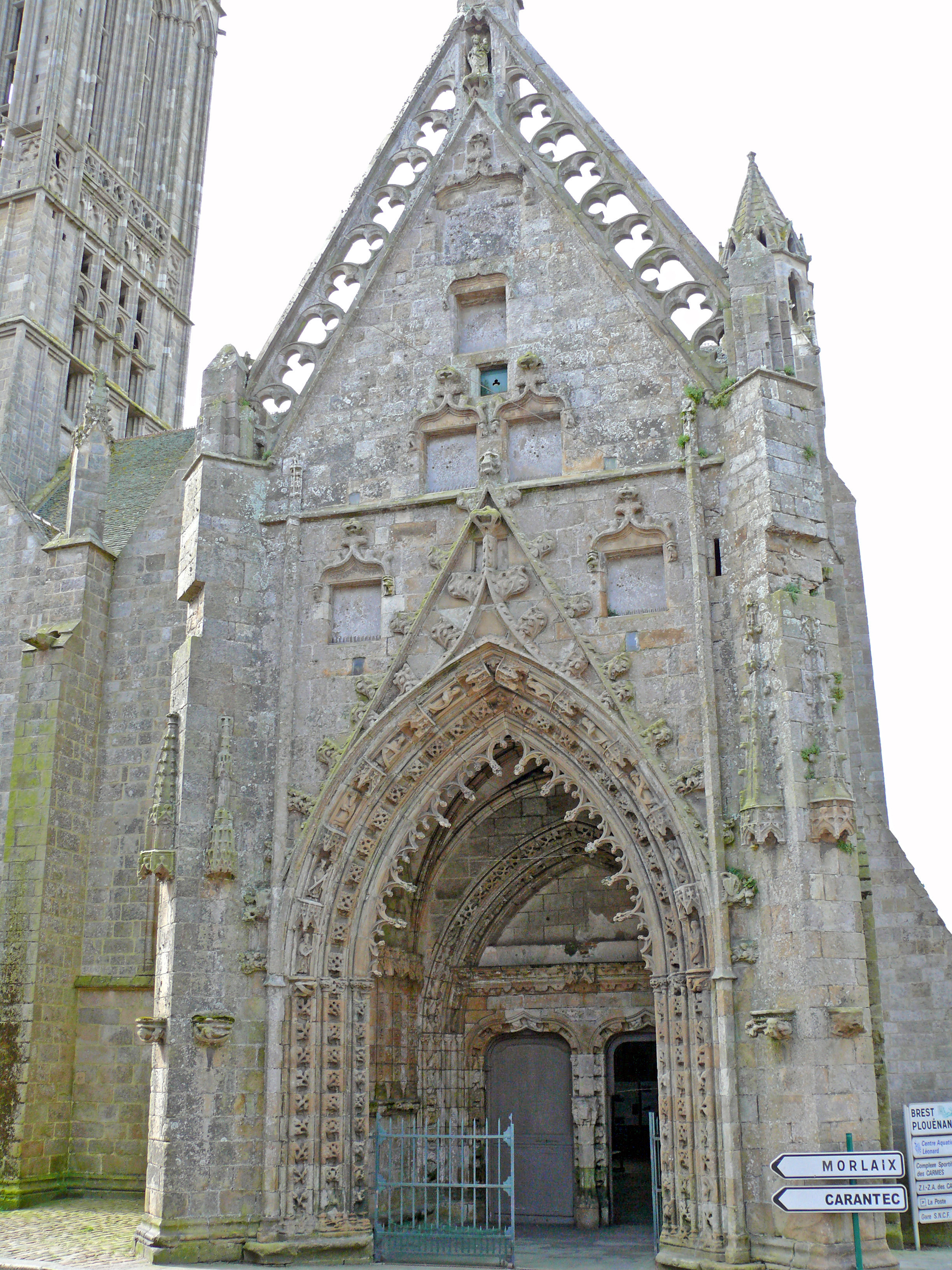
The north porch

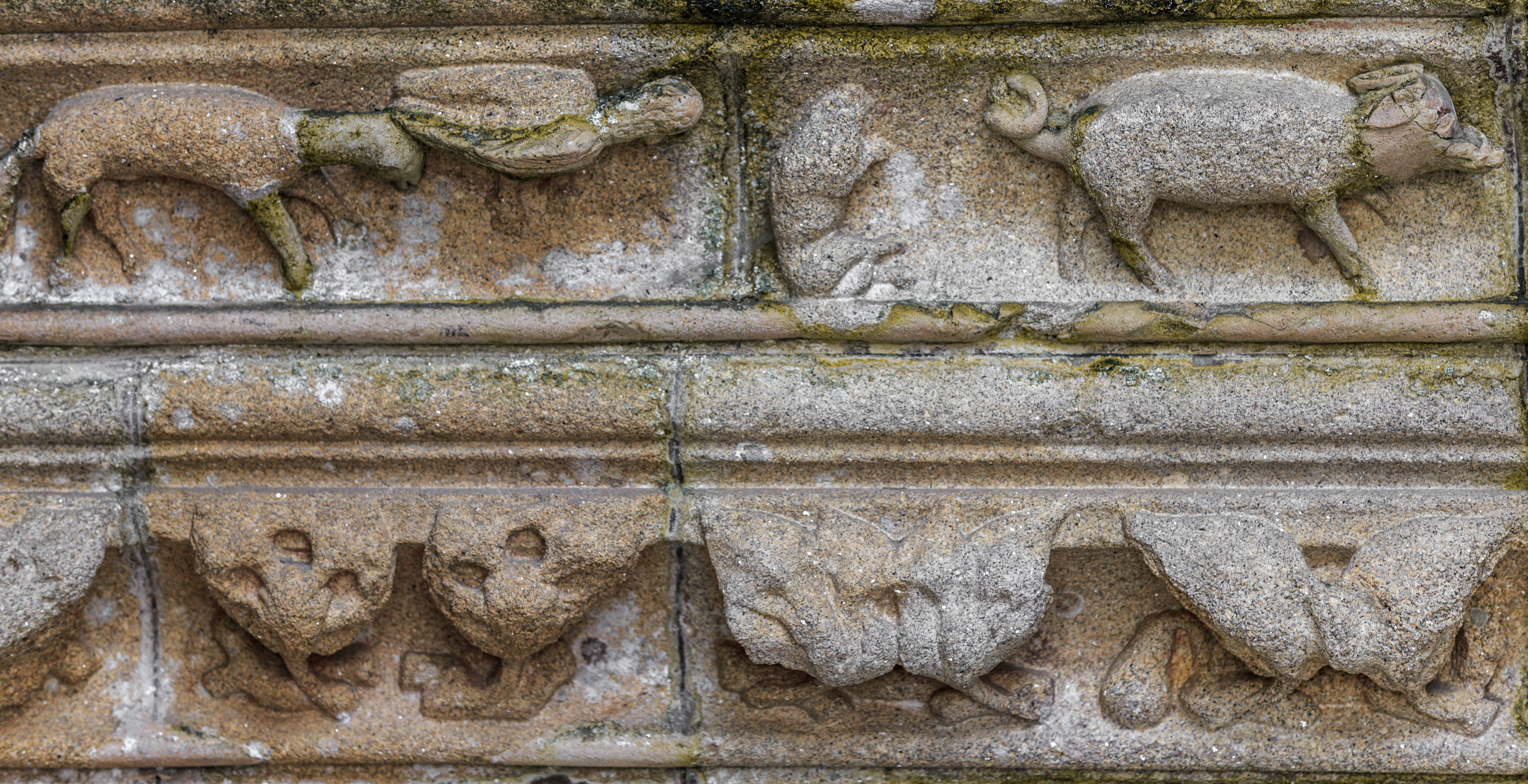
The north porch carvings

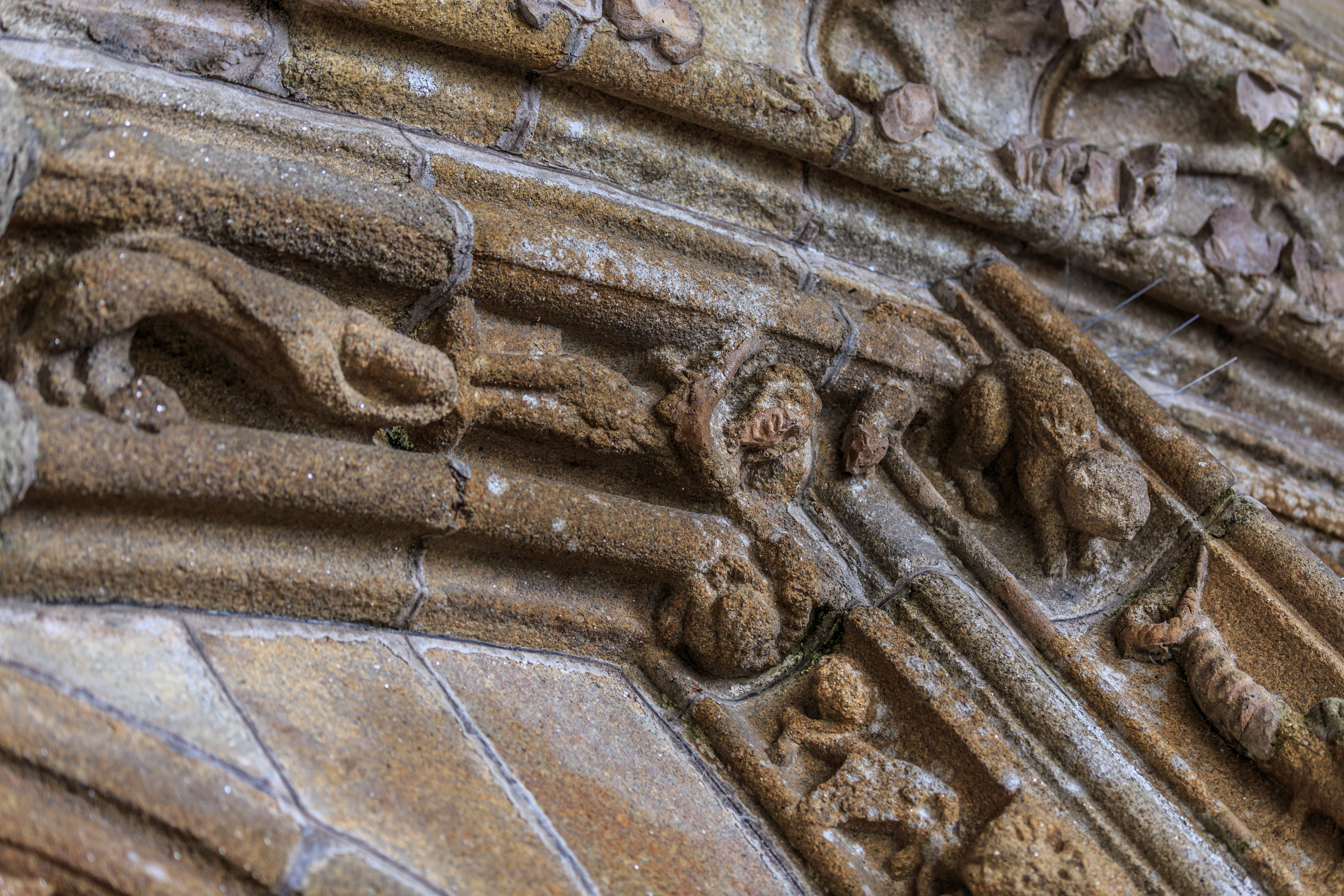
The north porch carvings

=== The south porch ===
Above the portal of the south porch is a tribune known as the "benediction".

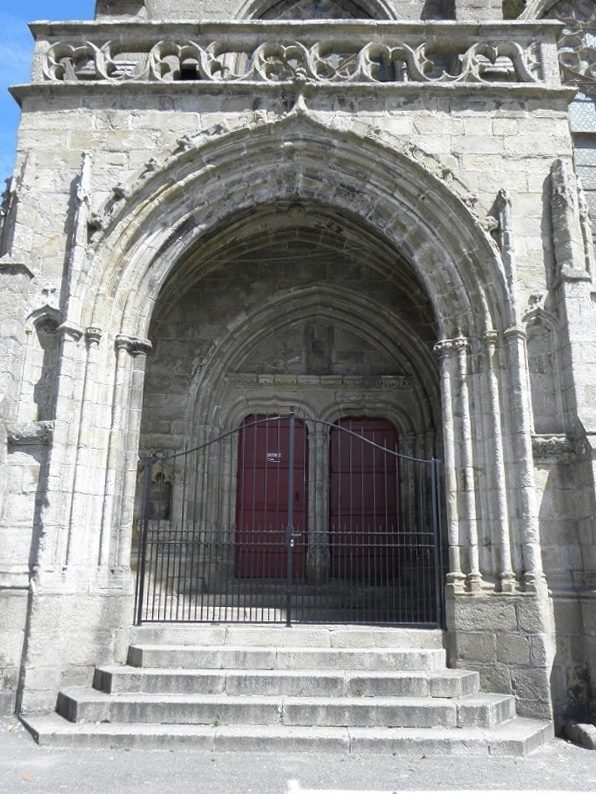
The south porch

=== Pulpit ===
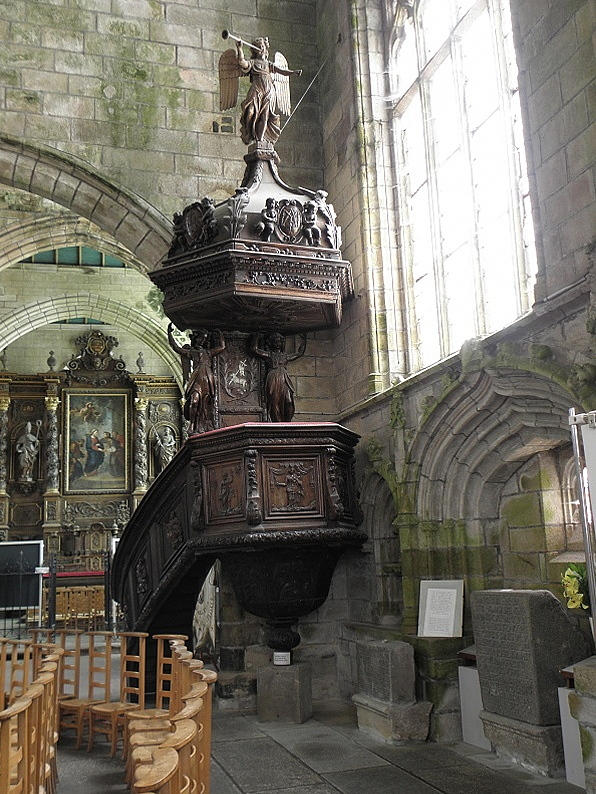
The Kreisker chapel pulpit

The 18th-century Kreisker pulpit (French: chaire à prêcher) came from the cathedral in 1975. It dates to the 18th century. The "abat-voix" is covered by a dome surmounted by an angel playing a trumpet. Two caryatids decorate the pulpit and the stairway is decorated with bas-reliefs depicting the Virgin Mary with child, Saint Paul and Saint Paul Aurélien.

=== Autel de la Vierge ===
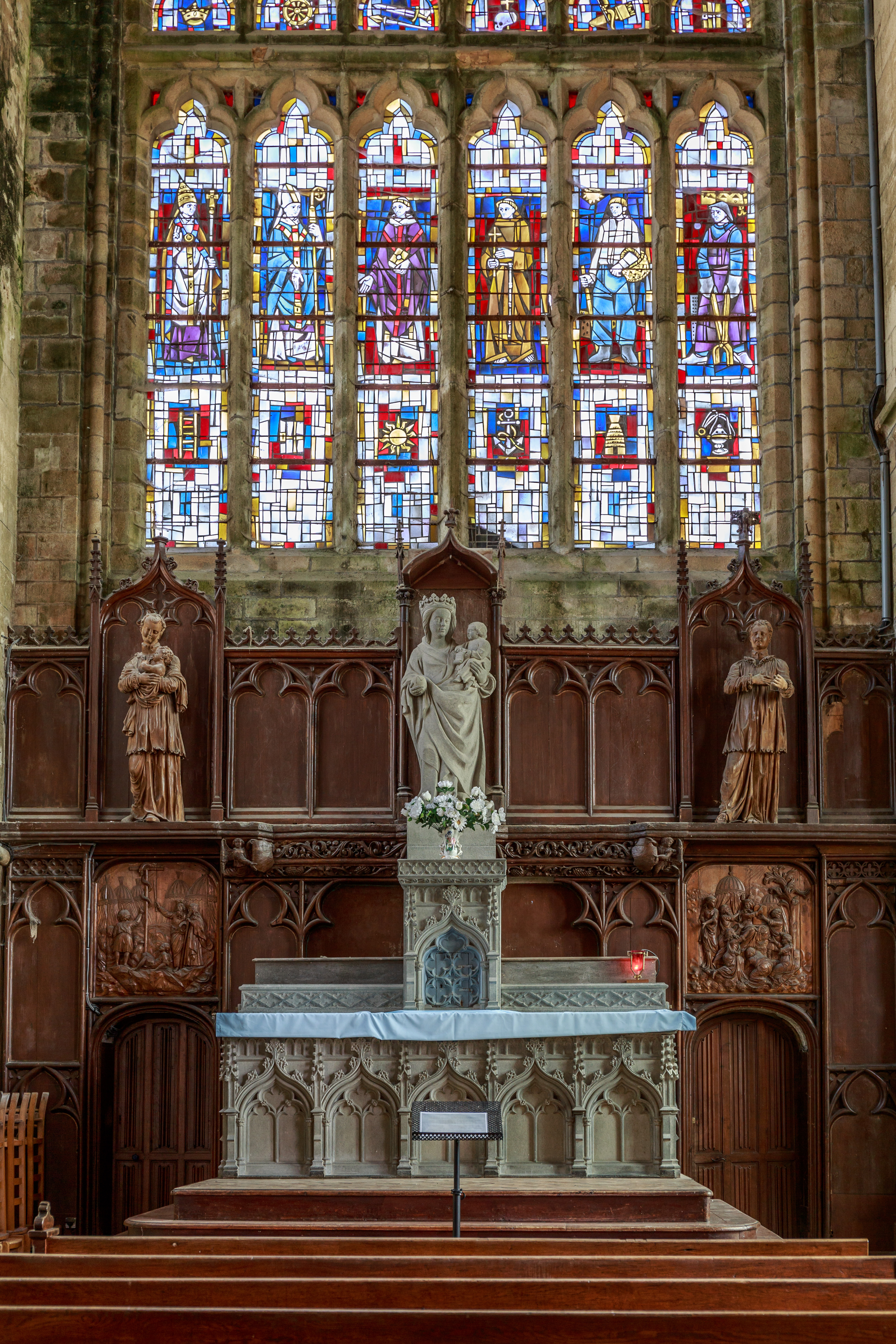
The Autel de la Vierge

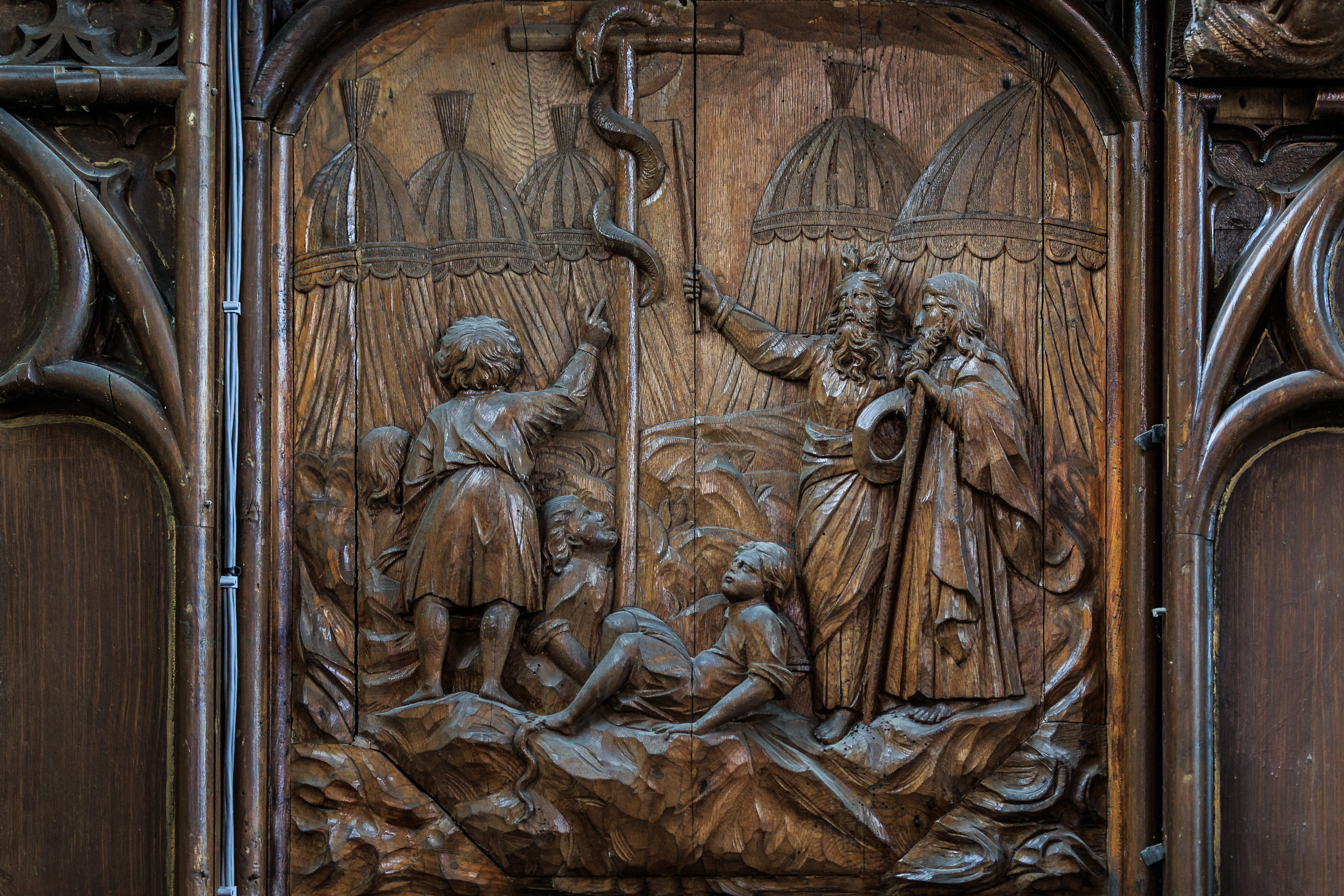
One of the bas-reliefs on the Autel de la Vierge

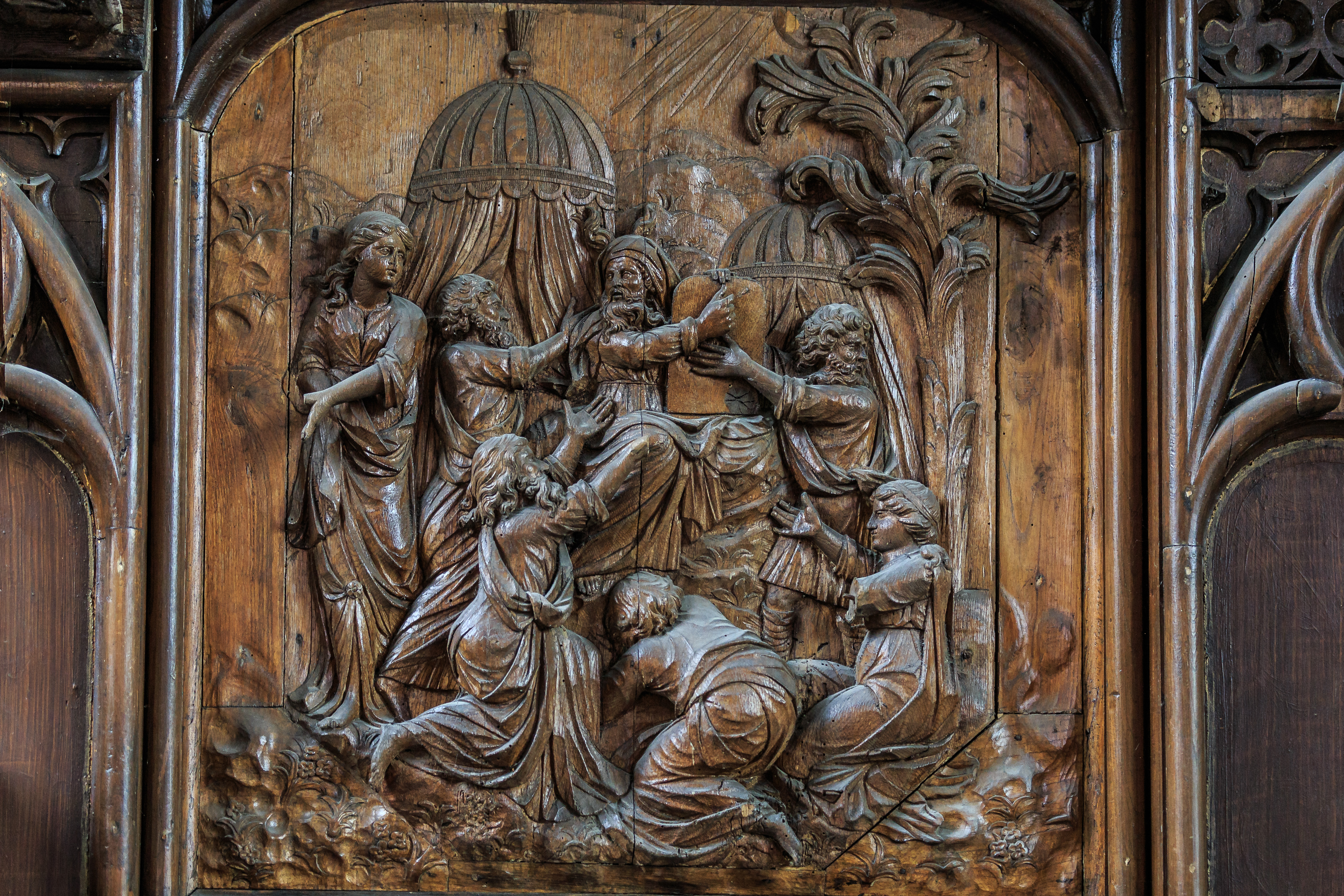
One of the bas-reliefs on the Autel de la Vierge

=== Memorial to Mons Péron ===
Péron was a principal of the Léon college who died in 1827.

=== Statue of Christ awaiting crucifixion ===
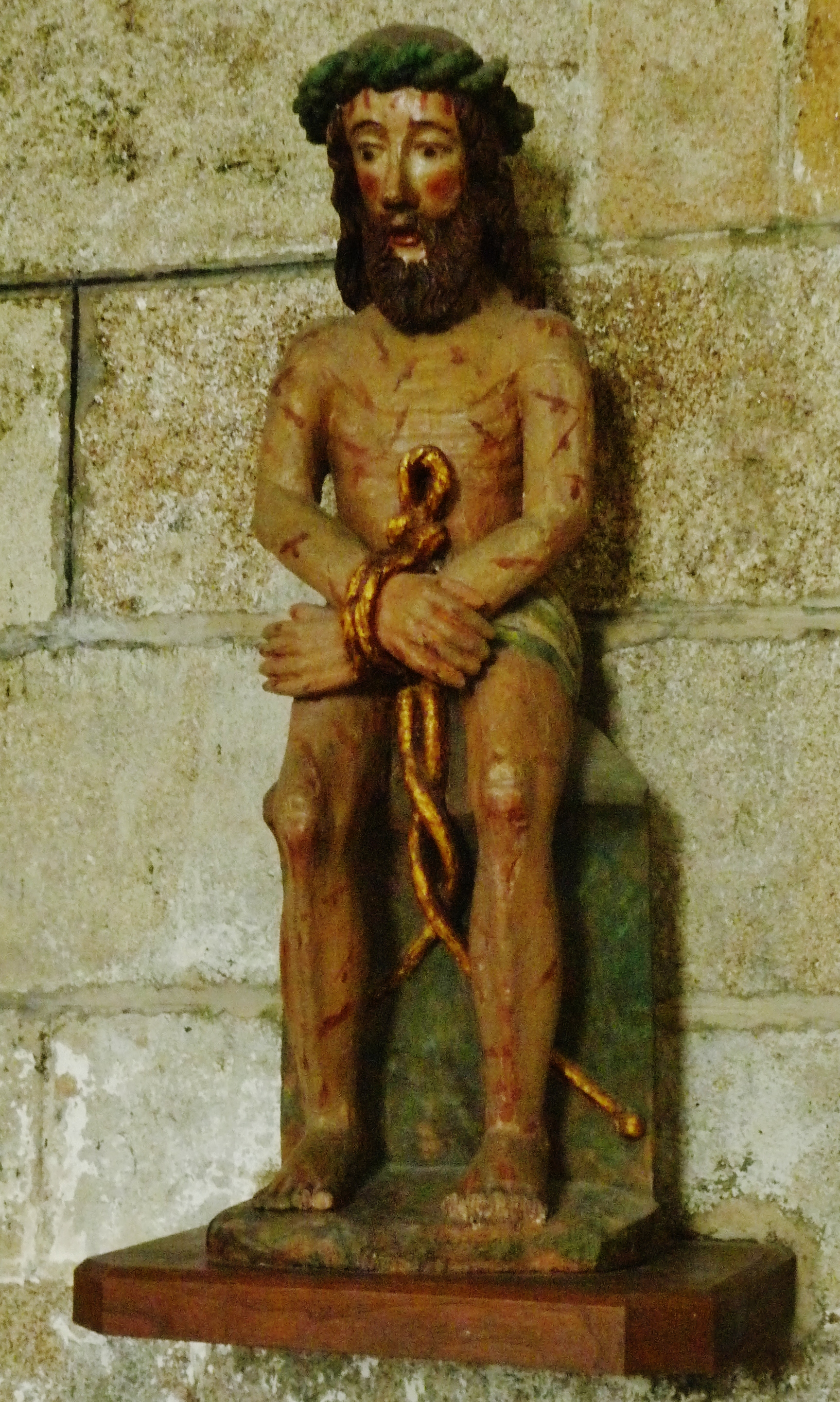

This dramatic sculpture of Jesus Christ awaiting crucifixion (French: Christ aux liens), his hands tied and his body bloodied from the beating he had sustained, dates to the 16th century. The statue is carved from wood and polychromed.

=== Altar with altarpiece and tabernacle."Le grand retable de la Visitation" ===
This two-tiered altar of the Visitation came from the Convent of the Minimes, which was subsequently destroyed, after the French Revolution. It dates back to 1684 and was the work of the sculptors Guillaume and François Lerrel. It is a magnificent piece and the inscription on the pediment reads "OMNIA IN GLORIA DOMINI; IHS; MAR". The altar has four twisted columns, magnificently carved, and a painting on canvas of the "visitation" and a copy of the "Albane". The doors of the altar's tabernacle are decorated with bas-reliefs depicting the prophet Elijah in the desert and the sacrifice of Abraham, as well as the Last Supper. The altar is also decorated with statues of Saint Nicholas and Sainte Marguerite. On the altarpiece are another two bas-reliefs, that on the left representing Saint Raymond de Pennafort at sea accompanied by two of his followers, and that on the right a bishop receiving "le cordon" from Saint Francis whilst an angel holds the cross Saint Francis is carried on the clouds. The painting is a copy of the painting of the Albane, the original of which can be seen in the Bordeaux museum.

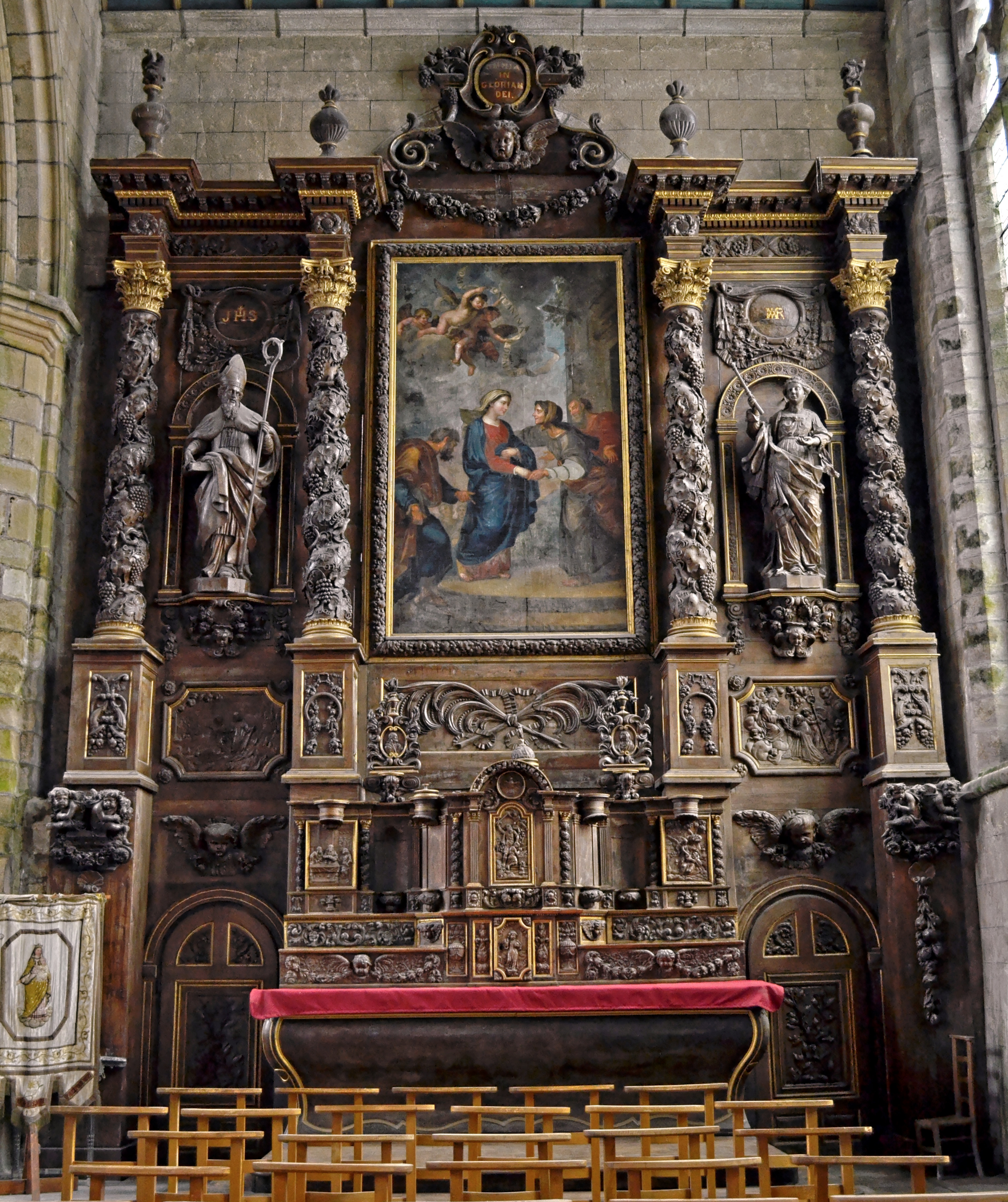
The altar depicting the "Visitation" in the Kreisker chapel. Note the oil painting in the centre depicting the "visitation".

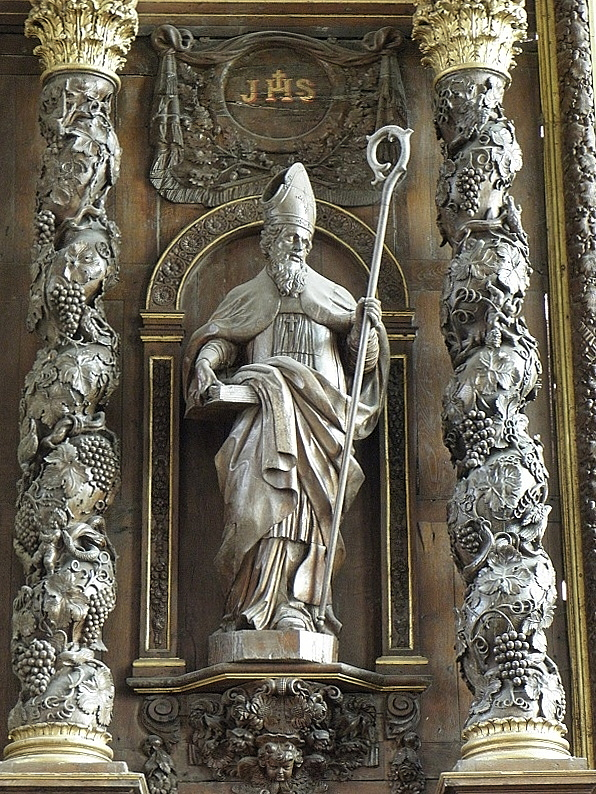
Statue to the left of the central painting depicting the visitation, thought to be Saint Augustine

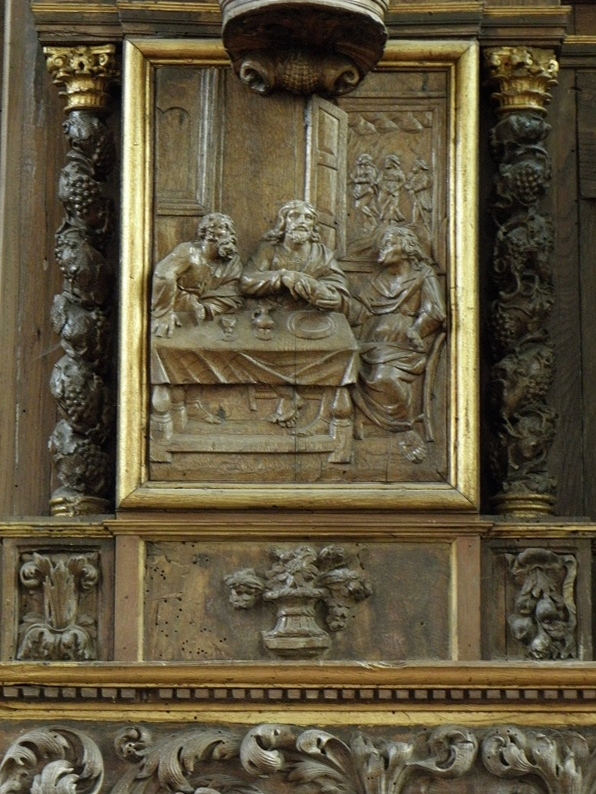
One of the bas-reliefs on the altarpiece depicting the feast at Emmaüs

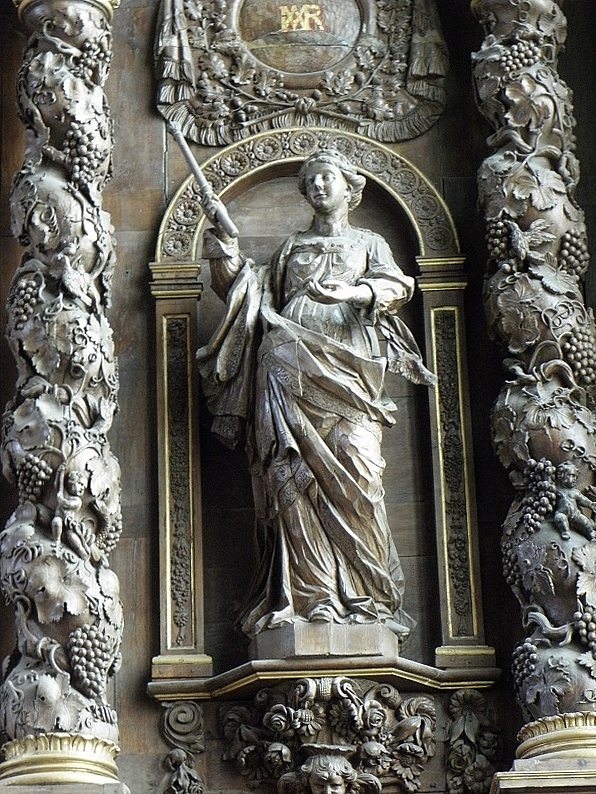

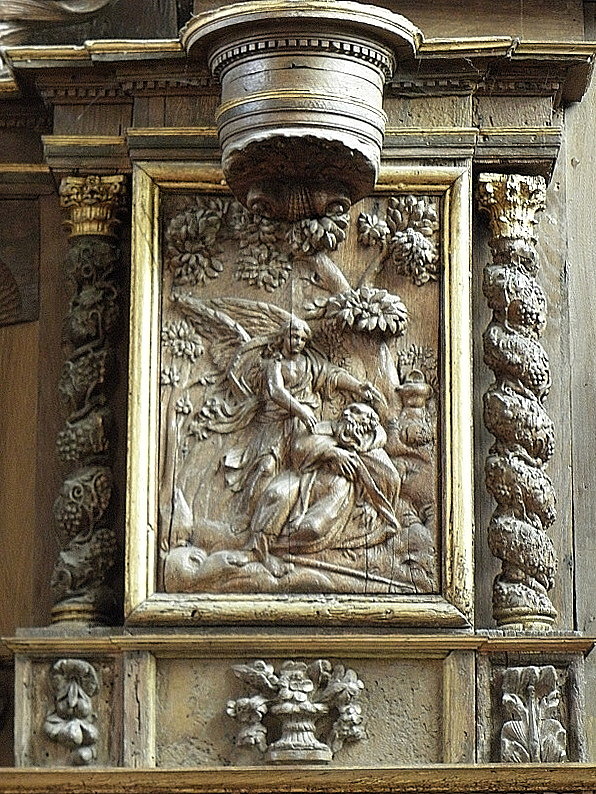
Elias with an angel

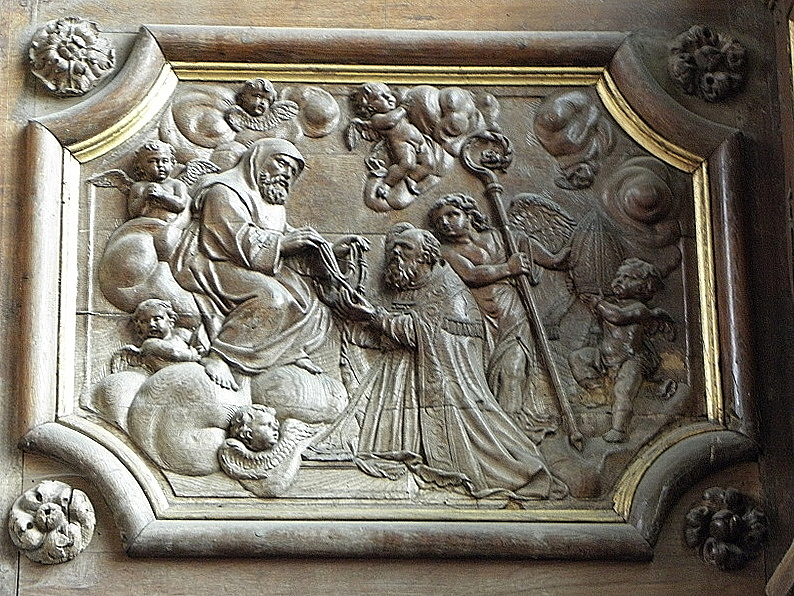
Saint-François-de-Paule receives the scapula

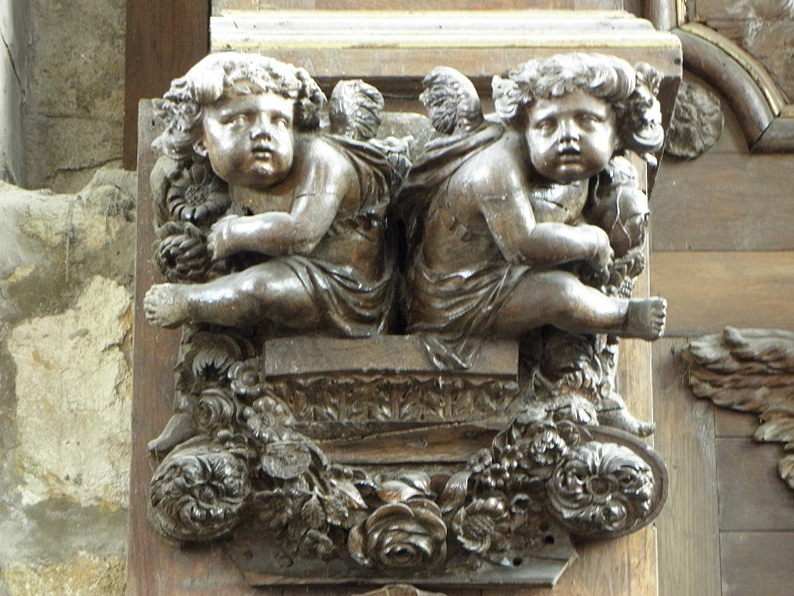
Cherubs adorning a console of the altarpiece of the former chapel of the Minimes

On each side of the chapel's master altar and above the sacristy door are two bas-reliefs. That on the right represents Moses receiving the tablets whilst that on the left depicts the "serpent d'airain" and the camp of the Hebrews. Above the master altar are statues of Saint Stanislas Kostka and Saint Louis de Gonzague. These early 18th-century statues came to Kreisker from the Chapelle du séminaire. Saint Louis de Gonzague was canonised in 1726 and Saint Stanislas Kostka in 1725.

=== The vase from Kerliviry ===
In the square in front of the chapel is a monumental granite vase dating to the 16th century from Kerliviry.

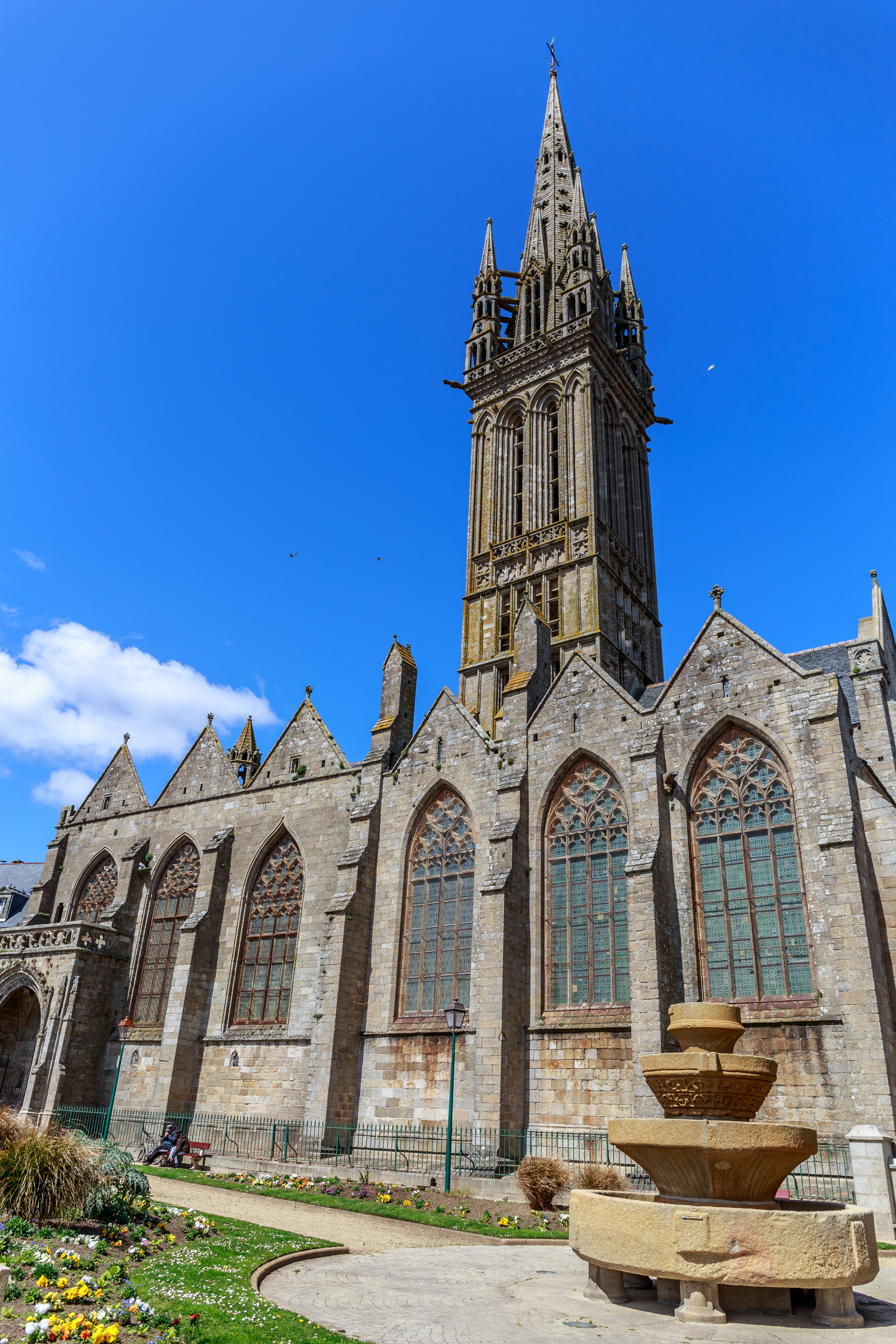
View of the monumental granite vase in front of the south façade of the Kreisker chapel

== Miscellaneous ==
=== War memorial maquette ===
The Kreisker chapel holds a plaster maquette of a 1919 war memorial (French: monument aux morts) by the Breton sculptor René Quillivic.

== See also ==
- List of works of the two Folgoët ateliers

== Bibliography ==
- Philippe Abjean, Notre-Dame du Kreisker, Léon'Art éditions, 2011, 171 pp.
