= Château de Rosanbo =

Château in Côtes d'Armor, France

Coordinates: 48°37′32″N 3°33′10″W

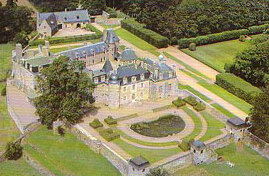
Rosanbo Castle

The Château de Rosanbo, in the Breton commune of Lanvellec in the French département of Côtes d'Armor (22), overlooks the Bô river valley. The origin of its name stems from this fact, as in Breton it means "rock on the Bô".

It has been classified as a Monument historique (Historic Monument).

== History ==
The château, which was in the past the stronghold of the Coskaër de Rosanbo family, then later of the Le Peletier de Rosanbo family, is square in shape and has been developed and re-fashioned throughout its history. In the 14th century, a fortified castle was built on a strategic headland, located 4 miles from the bay of Saint-Michel-en-Grève in order to prevent the ascent of the Bô by Scandinavian invaders. In the 16th century, it was extended with a Gothic manor.

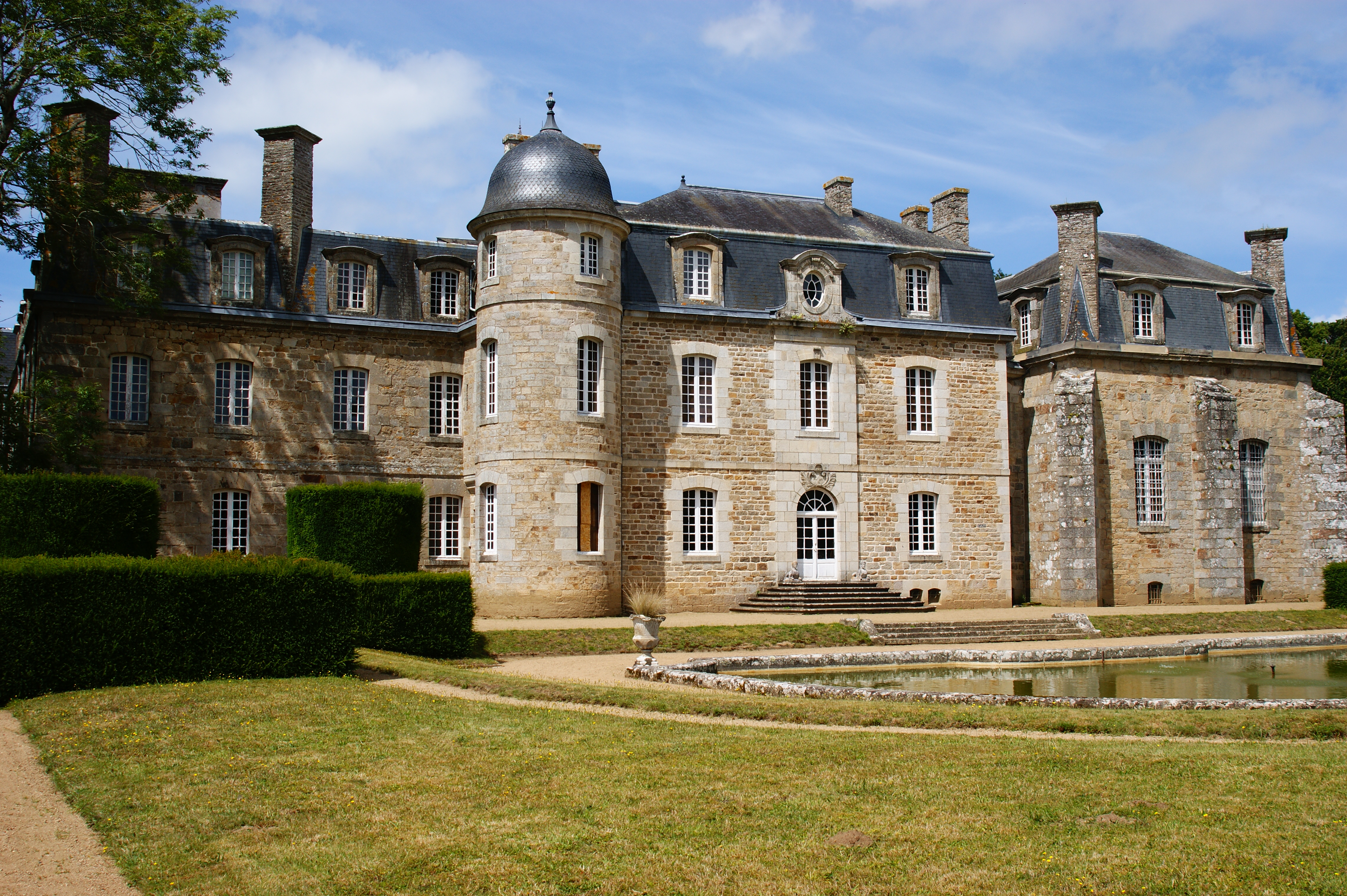
View from the southwest corner

The buildings were further extended in the 18th century by Louis Le Peletier de Keranroux, first president of the Paris parliament and husband of Geneviève de Coskaër (the last inheritor of that name). At the time of this redevelopment, the architect Joubert added a gallery to the château and a corner room overlooking the valley. The old kitchen was transformed into a wood panelled dining room and, on the floor above, additional new space allowed small rooms such as private bathrooms and boudoirs to be created. At the end of the 19th century, new suites were designed by the architect Lafargue, who was also responsible for the restoration of the châteaux of Josselin and Chenonceaux.
