= Renatus Harris =

English organ builder (c.1652 – 1724)

- Born: c. 1652; Bretagne, France
- Died: August/September 1724; Salisbury, England
- Spouse: Joan Hiett
- Children: Renatus Harris; John Harris
- Parents: Thomas Harris; Catherine Dallam
- Engineering career
- Discipline: Organ making

Renatus Harris (c. 1652 – 1724) was an English master organ maker in England in the late seventeenth and early eighteenth centuries.

During the period of the Commonwealth, in the mid-seventeenth century, Puritans controlled the country and organ music was banned in churches. Many organ makers left England for the continent, including Harris' father, Thomas. It was while the family was living in France that Harris was born. After the Restoration the family returned to England.

Harris grew up in his father's business and eventually became one of the two most prominent organ builders of his generation, along with his hated rival "Father" Bernard Smith. Harris had a flair for publicity and was not above using under-hand tactics against Smith. Harris's great-grandfather, Thomas Dallam, and his father, Robert Dallam, were also organ makers, as were Renatus Harris's sons, John and Renatus. John Harris was the father of Joseph Harris, a renowned harpsichord maker, who in turn was the father of English entomologist and engraver Moses Harris.

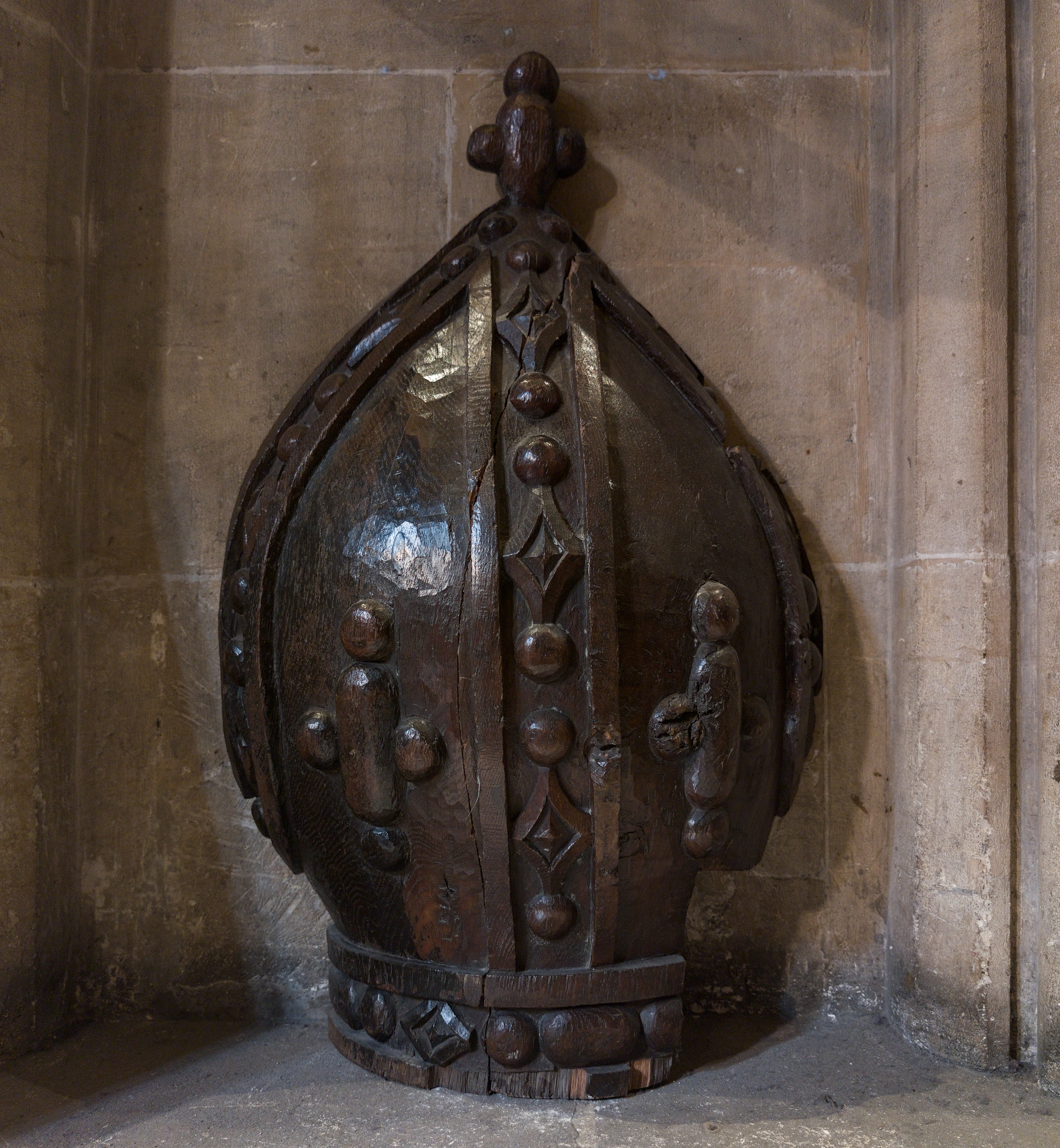
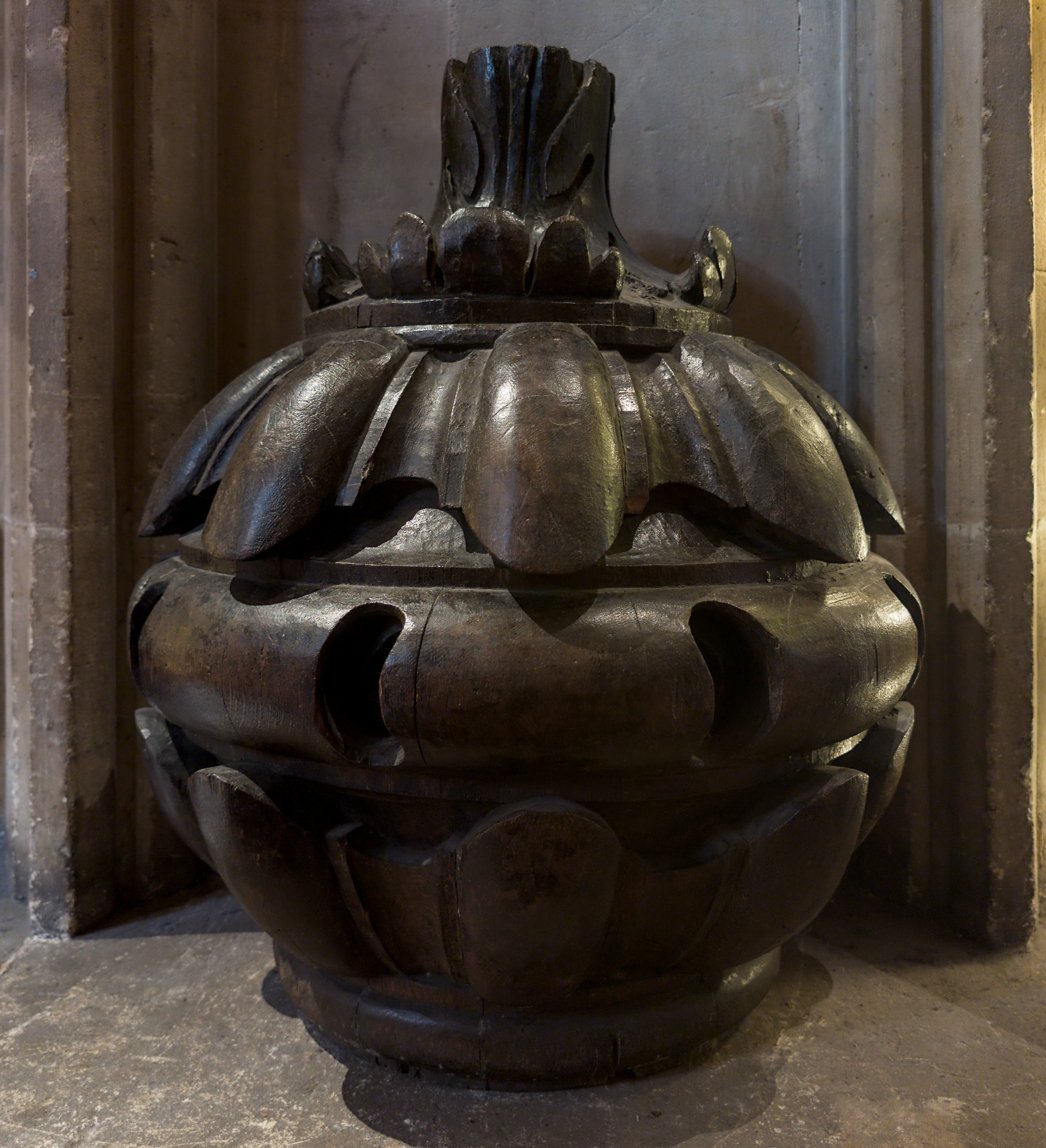
A pair of wooden carvings salvaged from the former Harris and Byfield organ of St Mary Redcliffe (1726)

He is credited with being the first to introduce the pedals to the organ, at St Mary Redcliffe, Bristol. However, the pedalboard was an addition of one octave of pull-down pedals and not the independent pedalboard we know today. He was also famous for introducing stops to organs which imitated particular instruments—a kind of hallmark—such as trumpet, cremona, cornet, etc.

Renatus Harris died at Salisbury in August or September 1724, shortly after completing his last organ with his son John at St Dionis Backchurch in the City of London.

== Organs of the Temple Church and Christ Church, Dublin ==
The rivalry between the two men led to the famous Battle of the Organs in 1684, when both were bidding for the contract to build the new organ for the Temple Church, London. Each erected an organ in the Temple Church and they hired prominent organists Giovanni Battista Draghi, John Blow and Henry Purcell to demonstrate the superiority of their instruments. Harris lost out to Smith, but in 1697, after Smith reneged on a contract for a new organ at Christ Church Cathedral, Dublin, Harris appositely installed the instrument which had lost there instead. Harris's organ, which was installed and maintained by John Baptist Cuvillie, and later Philip Hollister, was replaced by an organ by John Byfield in 1752. However, the Harris-Cuvillie organ which survived the 'Battle of the Organs' today survives in St John's Church, Wolverhampton.

== Extant Harris organs ==
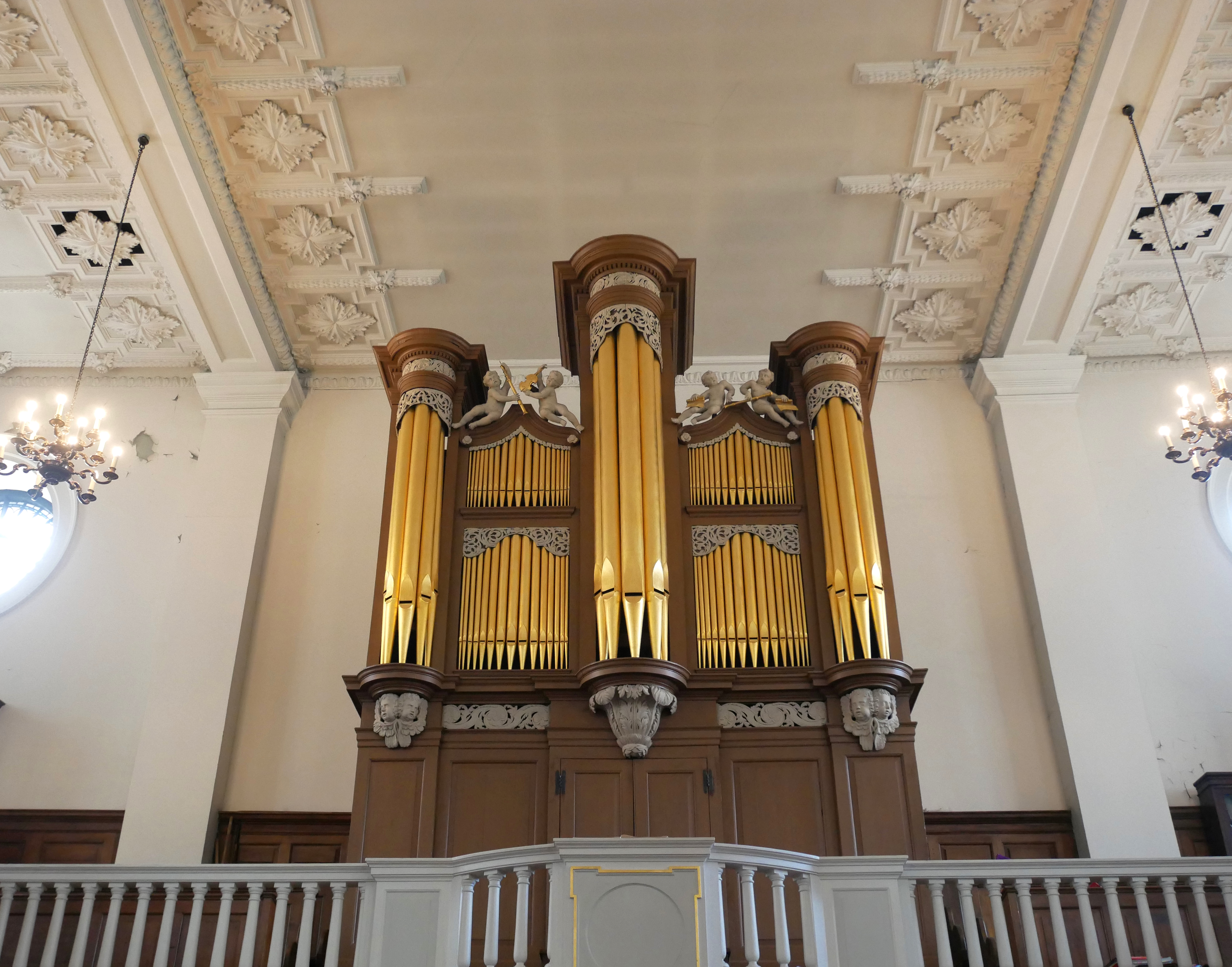
The organ at the south end of the Church of St Botolph's Aldgate

The most complete surviving organ by Harris is that of St Botolph's Aldgate, built in 1702–1704, which is also regarded as the oldest church organ in the United Kingdom. It was restored in 2005–2006 by Martin Goetze and Dominic Gwynn, and features in the documentary The Elusive English Organ. Among Harris' surviving or partially surviving organs are those of Bristol Cathedral (1685), All Hallows Twickenham (1700), and the Worshipful Company of Merchant Taylors' Hall, City of London (1722) (Restored by Mander Organs in 1966). A Harris organ at Christ Church Greyfriars, also known as Christ Church Newgate, in London was much rebuilt by William Hill & Sons in 1838 to designs by Henry Gauntlett and was destroyed along with the church during the Blitz in December 1940. The organ of St Michael, Cornhill contains nine ranks from the Harris instrument of 1684.
