= Robert Dallam =

English organ builder (born ca. 1602)

Robert Dallam (born ca. 1602) was an English organ builder active in England and France. He was a member of the Dallam family of organ builders.

Robert's father, Thomas Dallam, died about 1630. The first organ Robert made independently from his father may be the Milton Organ now at Tewkesbury Abbey which was commissioned around 1630 by Magdalen College, Oxford.

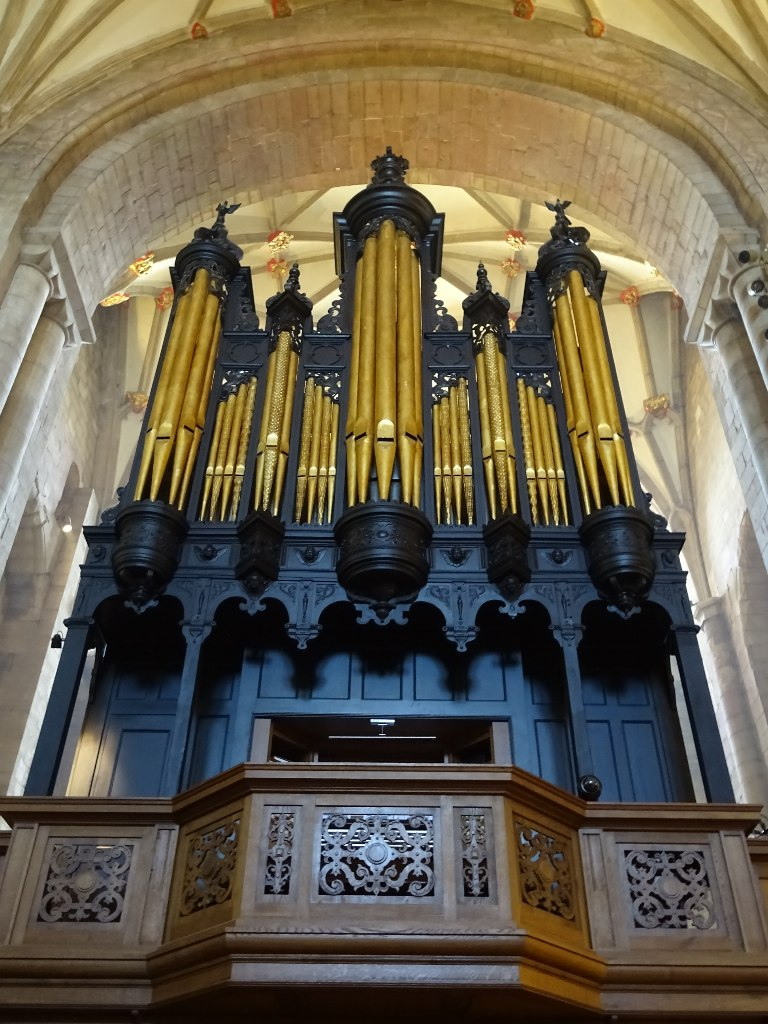
The Milton Organ

Although based in London, he worked on organs around the country in the 1630s including a new instrument for York Minster.

Dallam and his family relocated to Brittany in 1643. During the civil war and English Commonwealth, when it was impossible to pursue a career as an organ builder in England, he worked on a number of commissions in Brittany including an instrument at Lanvellec. Dallam adapted to the French style of organ building which included stops not called for in English organs.

In 1660, following the restoration of the monarchy, Robert Dallam and other members of his family returned to England, although his eldest son Thomas remained in France building organs. There was plenty of work in England replacing or repairing organs that had been damaged by Puritans, although the Dallam family faced competition from other organ builders. Robert and his sons Ralph and George built an organ for St George's Chapel, Windsor Castle, which had been damaged during the civil war. Robert died in 1665 while work was in progress on a new organ at New College, Oxford. Ralph completed the instrument.

Robert was buried at Oxford with a Latin inscription on his gravestone. Hic jacet Dnus Robertus Dallum Instrumenti Pneumatici (quod vulgo Organum nuncupant) peritissimus Artifex; filius Thomæ Dallum de Dallum in comitat. Lancastriæ, mortuus est ultimo die Maii Anno Domini 1665, ætatis suæ 63.
