= Committee of American Students of the School of Beaux-Arts, Paris =

Early 20th century organization of American art students in Paris

An example of a printed card-back from one of the postcards produced by the Comité. In this case, the card is inscribed with a location, date, and signature; but is un-numbered.

The Committee of American Students of the School of Beaux-Arts, Paris (Comité des Étudiants Américains de l'École des Beaux-Arts Paris [C.E.A. à l'E.D.B.A.]) was an organization of American art students at the Ecole des Beaux-Arts in Paris. American alumni of the school were also involved. It was active as a war and war-relief charity supporting the French cause during World War I, operating from at least 1916 through the end of the war. Among other activities, they raised funds through the production and sale of art-postcards.

== Overview ==
The Comité des Étudiants Américains de l'École des Beaux-Arts Paris, an organization of American art students at the Ecole des Beaux-Arts in Paris, was set up as a war and war-relief charity in support of the French cause in the First World War; operating from at least 1916 to early 1919. American alumni of the school were also involved. The group was strongly Francophile.

A primary focus of their charitable activities was providing help to fellow art students who were serving in the armed forces, and to those students' families. They also supported other efforts, including more directly military causes.

The committee raised funds by organizing the production, exhibition, and sale of art-postcards. These were created variously, by an array of professional French artists as well as by art students. Later, they also published a periodical; the Gazette de l'Ecole des Beaux-Arts. The group had other sources of funding as well.

In addition to their charitable activities, and fund-raising for those activities, the group's efforts and products helped to express and promote sympathy for France (and occupied Belgium) during the war; particularly among Americans. This was one of many efforts by Francophile Americans in France and the United States in support of the French and Allied cause; both before and after their own country entered the war.

Notable American architect and École des Beaux-Arts alumnus Whitney Warren was one of the organization's founders. Another key organizer was (Frank) Ronald Simmons (1885-1918), the son of a wealthy Rhode Island industrialist, who became a very close friend of Edith Wharton. After his sudden death from influenza, he became the basis for the character of "Boylston" in her War novel "A Son at the Front" (written in 1919, published in 1923). War charity work, and the involvement of Americans in it, are mentioned; but the Comité is not described specifically, by name.

The American journalist Richard Harding Davis (1864-1916) included the following piece about the group in his wartime book With The French In France And Salonika (1916), as part of chapter XI. Hints for Those Who Want To Help.

"There are some other very good bargains. Are you a lover of art, and would you become a patron of art? If that is your wish, you can buy an original water-color for fifty cents, and so help an art student who is fighting at the front, and assist in keeping alive his family in Paris. Is not that a good bargain?

As everybody knows, the École des Beaux-Arts in Paris is free to students from all the world. It is the alma mater of some of the best-known American artists and architects. On its rolls are the names of Sargent, St. Gaudens, Stanford White, Whitney Warren, Beckwith, Coffin, MacMonnies.

A Comité des Étudiants Américains de l'École des Beaux-Arts Paris exhibition; probably at the École des Beaux-Arts, Paris, circa 1918

Certain schools and colleges are so fortunate as to inspire great devotion on the part of their students, as, in the story told of every college, of the student being led from the football field, who struggles in front of the grand stand and shouts: "Let me go back. I'd die for dear old ——"

But the affection of the students of the Beaux-Arts for their masters, their fellow students and the institution is very genuine.

They do not speak of the distinguished artists, architects, engravers, and sculptors who instruct them as "Doc," or "Prof." Instead they call him "master," and no matter how often they say it, they say it each time as though they meant it.

The American students, even when they return to Paris rich and famous, go at once to call upon the former master of their atelier, who, it may be, is not at all famous or rich, and pay their respects.

And, no matter if his school of art has passed, and the torch he carried is in the hands of younger Frenchmen, his former pupils still salute him as master, and with much the same awe as the village curé shows for the cardinal.

When the war came 3,000 of the French students of the Beaux-Arts, past and present, were sent to the front, and there was no one to look after their parents, families, or themselves, it seemed a chance for Americans to try to pay back some of the debt so many generations of American artists, architects, and sculptors owed to the art of France.

Whitney Warren, the American architect, is one of the few Americans who, in spite of the extreme unpopularity of our people, is still regarded by the French with genuine affection. And in every way possible he tries to show the French that it is not the American people who are neutral, but the American Government.

During this period, efforts to strengthen Franco-American relations were channeled through academic and humanitarian collaboration. A central initiative involved providing organized support for students at the École des Beaux-Arts.

It is hard to understand how in such surroundings they work, not all day, but at all. The rooms were decorated in the time of the first Napoleon; the ceilings and walls are white and gold, and in them are inserted paintings and panels. The windows look into formal gardens and courts filled with marble statues and busts, bronze medallions and copies of frescoes brought from Athens and Rome. In this atmosphere the students bang typewriters, fold blankets, nail boxes, sort out woollen (sic) gloves, cigarettes, loaves of bread, and masks against asphyxiating gas. The mask they send to the front was invented by Francis Jacques, of Harvard, one of the committee, and has been approved by the French Government.

There is a department which sends out packages to the soldiers in the trenches, to those who are prisoners, and to the soldiers in the hospitals. There is a system of demand cards on which is a list of what the committee is able to supply. In the trenches the men mark the particular thing they want and return the card. The things most in demand seem to be corn-cob pipes and tobacco from America, sketch-books, and small boxes of water-colors.

The committee also edits and prints a monthly magazine. It is sent to those at the front, and gives them news of their fellow students, and is illustrated, it is not necessary to add, with remarkable talent and humor. It is printed by hand. The committee also supplies the students with post-cards on which the students paint pictures in water-colors and sign them. Every student and ex-student, even the masters paint these pictures. Some of them are very valuable. At two francs fifty centimes the autograph alone is a bargain. In many cases your fifty cents will not only make you a patron of art, but it may feed a very hungry family. Write to Ronald Simmons or Cyrus Thomas, École des Beaux-Arts, 17 Quai Malaquais."

The name 'Comité des Étudiants Américains de l'École des Beaux-Arts Paris' is generically descriptive in French. There were very likely associations of American students at the Ecole des Beaux Arts in Paris, both before and after the war, who may have used the same, or similar, names. There were certainly other associations of American students at various schools throughout France, many of whom participated in efforts to help the French cause in various ways, during the war. Also, there were myriad other "Comités". Additionally, student organizations frequently published periodicals, and the term "gazette" was not uncommon in the titles of these publications. That said, the Comité des Étudiants Américains de l'École des Beaux-Arts Paris which was active during World War I was a specific organization run by a specific group of people, that engaged in particular activities in charity and the arts during the war; and it has left behind an artistic "body of work(s)" relevant to the period.

== Postcards ==
The committee of students raised funds by organizing the production, exhibition, and sale of art-postcards; created by professional French artists, as well as by students. Production of the cards began in 1916, and continued through the end of the war.

Their postcards covered a range of subjects; from war scenes and war ruins, to typical tourist views, and sometimes other types of artistic images, in a variety of styles. The levels of effort, detail, technical skill, and artistic merit shown in the cards varies widely. Some of them are highly finished, others are more like rough "sketches"; although the tendency is for the post cards to be "ready and presentable for sale", as suits their intended purpose. The works include original drawings and paintings, as well as low-volume printed-works such as engravings, etchings, etc. For the most part, it's clear that they have been created by professionally trained artists, of the French school, and of the period. The Comité post cards are typically signed by the artist, often with a date, and usually included some description of the subject.

The backs of the postcards are marked with a printed inscription "The Comité des Étudiants Américains de l'École des Beaux-Arts Paris guarantee the authenticity of this post card". Most of the cards have a specific and fairly elaborate printed design on the reverse side, which includes graphical elements as well as the inscription. These card-backs are monochrome-printed in coloured ink; ink colours ranging from rusty-brown to yellow-orange were used. The design is signed at the bottom-centre, to the left of the canon, but the name tends to be illegible; possibly it is Rene Jaudon, who entered the Beaux-Arts at Paris in 1910. The pattern was, however, unsuitable for postal use in that it did not conform to international standards for postcard formats. Sometimes the word "picture" is used instead of "post card" on these card-backs, possibly as a late variant.

Many, but not all, of the cards were hand-numbered on the back in what appears to be a straightforward numerical count. Based on the numbers and dates of known examples, and assuming the numbering is by a simple-count system, the total number of postcards created was probably around 40,000.

After the war, at least 1 book was published showing a selection of the best postcards produced by the Comité, as determined by the book's editors (bibliographical information is pending).

The New Mexico State University Library Archives and Special Collections has an album of 398 of the group's postcards in their collection; this material is not presently available online (as of 2020), however a guide to the collection can be found online . A few of the postcards are also listed in the archive collections of other public institutions.

=== Gallery ===
VERSAILLES - (swans in the water) - by "Gandon" - "2 12 16"

Obverse of the card shown in the lede image -- 1916-06-24

Chapelle Detruite pres de Nieuport (presumably Nieuwpoort, Belgium)- June 1917; by "Schiehle"

SCHIEHLÉ Le blessé de guerre Juin 1917; a wounded poilu, recovering from his injuries. Obverse & reverse of card; un-numbered

EN SENTINELLE by Reni (Rene) Jaudon, 1916; numbered 2172

Kreisker chapel—1916-11-25

War ruins in Chevincourt, in winter; by Alexandre Bertin.

Pastoral scene of a shepherd-boy and one of his sheep, by Jean Souverbie; circa 1917

Avenue Gambetta during a bombardment of Soissons, March 1917

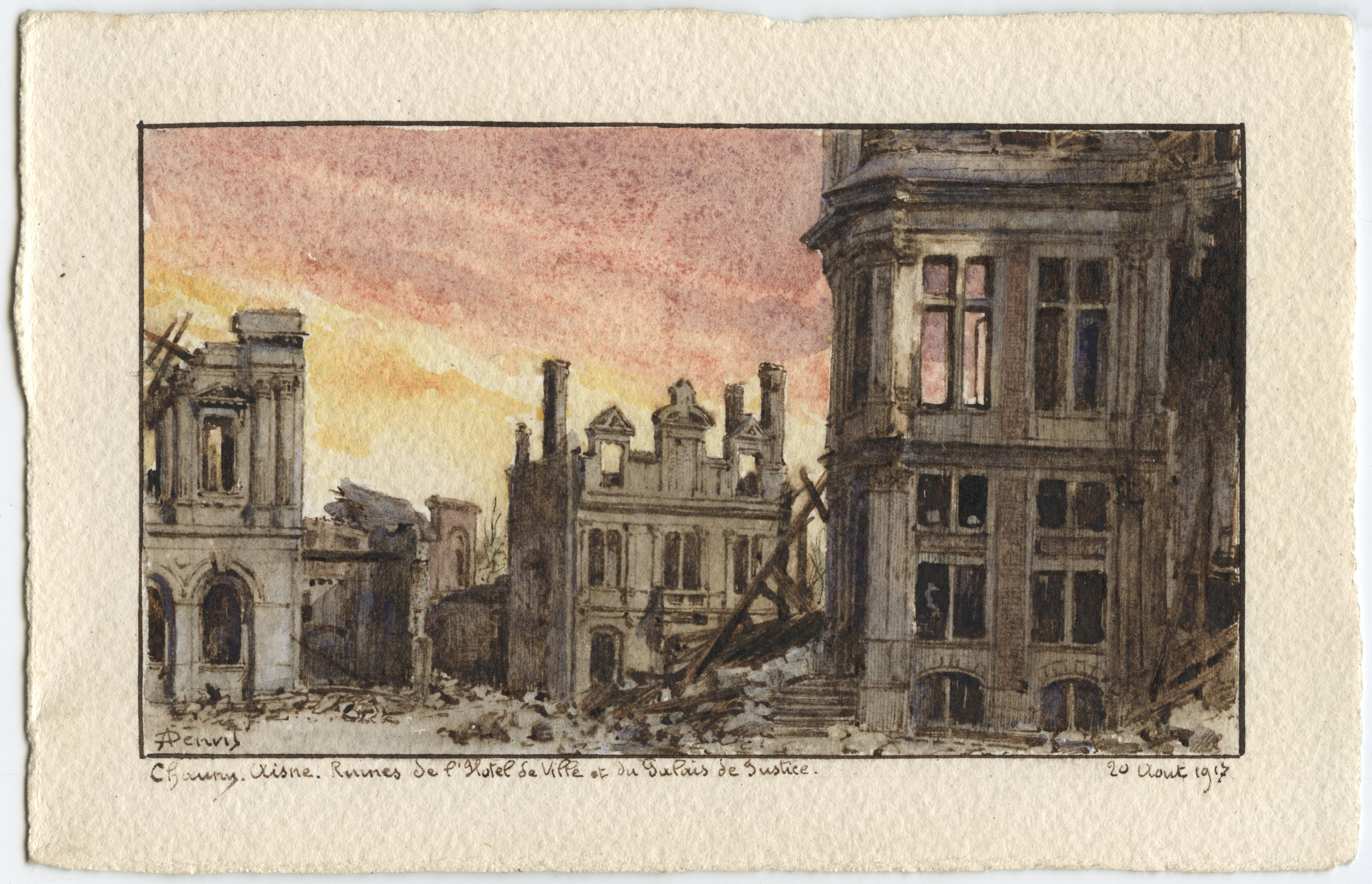
War ruins in Chauny, in the Aisne, France; by Angèle Blanche Denvil, 20 August 1917.

Chemin des Dames Déc. 1917 "UN CLAiRON"

Mahdia. La Jétée

TiLLOLOY - 1917 - signed "SOLD" - war ruins at the Chateau Tilloloy

A view of the Bievre River

== Gazette de l'Ecole des Beaux-Arts ==
The organization also published a periodical during this period, the Gazette de l'Ecole des Beaux-Arts. It was offered for sale by subscription, and may have been provided free of charge to serving students/alumni. The Gazette served as a means to inform students who had been mobilised, of school activities and relevant news; as well as providing another source of fund-raising for the group. The Comité also helped and inspired student groups at other French arts-schools to produce similar wartime publications.

From the limited information available, the start-date, end-date, and number of editions produced are unknown; as are the quantities printed. The one example found online is the edition of October–November-December 1918, produced in January 1919. The Gazette was published in French, book-style, in a 2-column format; with professional newspaper-quality printing in black ink, on what looks like unfinished (i.e.: no coating, glossy or satin) paper of a fairly heavy grade of slightly rough newsprint. This volume has about 41 printed pages, with some blanks at the end. Aside from the cover illustration (drawing) and some minor decorations around the text on a few pages, and 1 page (single-side, on glossy paper) of black & white photographs, the rest of the material is entirely in text-form. It includes a notice-page of deaths, promotions, etc. of students/alumni serving in the military; articles about the war; news of the school; news & information of interest to art-professionals; and some pieces relating to student-politics. The general tone is patriotic, and generally uncritical of the war as conducted by the French government. There is no inclusion of pacifist material, and only limited representation of leftist views; nothing "revolutionary", pro-communist, or otherwise hard-core "Red". As the single example of the gazette presently available, when preparing this article, and as an edition produced after the French & Allied victory in the War, it is difficult to judge how representative of the rest of the series this particular volume is.

== See also ==
- American Committee for Devastated France
- World War I in art and literature
