= Battle of Saint-Pol-de-Léon =

14th century battle

Coordinates: 48°41′10″N 3°59′06″W

- Part of the Breton War of Succession, Hundred Years' War
Date	9 June 1346
Location	Saint-Pol-de-Léon, Brittany
Result	Anglo-Breton victory

Belligerents
House of Montfort, Brittany; Kingdom of England	House of Blois, Brittany; Kingdom of France

Commanders and leaders
Sir Thomas Dagworth	Charles of Blois

Strength
180	Unknown, ~1,000

Casualties and losses
Very light	Heavy

The Battle of Saint-Pol-de-Léon was a minor action during the Breton War of Succession and thus part of the larger Hundred Years War. The battle was fought in June 1346 and marked a minor turning point in the fortunes of the Montfortists and their English allies in Brittany following several setbacks including the imprisonment and subsequent death of their leader, John of Montfort.

== Brittany in 1346 ==
The commander of the Anglo-Breton faction was Sir Thomas Dagworth, a veteran professional soldier who had served with his overlord King Edward III for many years and was trusted to conduct the Breton war in an effective manner whilst Edward was raising funds in England and planning the invasion of Normandy for the following year, which would eventually result in the crushing battle of Crécy. Dagworth's fortunes were low, and his forces were stretched across a handful of coastal towns and castles. His main opponent, Charles of Blois, was on the march with a substantial army of East Breton volunteers, French soldiers and German mercenaries, and a number of Dagworth's allies and subordinates were showing signs of changing sides or declaring their independence from his command and setting up their own fiefdoms.

== Battle ==
To strengthen his faction's morale, Dagworth was conducting a tour of his possessions on the Northern coast of Brittany, thus confirming support in his rear and ensuring a valid line of retreat to England should his besieged strongholds in the south of the region fall. On 9 June, Dagworth was in the Finistère region, moving north from the town of Morlaix, scene of his earlier victory in the battle of Morlaix. Here Blois, who had led the fastest elements of his army north in a surprise march, ambushed Dagworth and his 180-man bodyguard at the isolated village of Saint-Pol-de-Léon. Dagworth formed up his men and led them in a rapid withdrawal towards a nearby hill, where they dug trenches and prepared positions.

Blois was an intelligent general, and he had already seen and noted the ruthless efficiency of the English longbow at Morlaix and in numerous smaller skirmishes. He knew that cavalry would be doomed on the slopes of the hill and that the only way to break the English position and capture Dagworth before relief could arrive was a direct frontal assault with infantry. To this end he dismounted all of his soldiers and abandoned his horse himself and ordered his superior numbers to make a three-pronged assault on the Anglo-Breton lines. The assault and the others that followed it during the afternoon were all repulsed by accurate archery fire, which decimated the attackers' ranks, and some desperate last-ditch hand-to-hand fighting. The final assault came at last light with Charles himself in the vanguard, but even this failed to achieve victory, and the Franco-Breton forces were forced to abandon their attack and return to Eastern Brittany, leaving behind dozens of dead, wounded and captured soldiers on the hillside of the battlefield.

== Aftermath ==
The Anglo-Breton force had suffered lightly, and, despite a number of severe injuries, none of the knights or men-at-arms had been killed, while losses among the archers and rank and file were low, although actual totals were not recorded. The Franco-Bretons suffered more severely, although contemporary accounts are almost certainly exaggerated. The real effect of the battle was psychological. Charles of Blois, who had a reputation as a fierce and intelligent commander, had again been defeated by an English commander, and one of common stock at that. Indeed, Charles failed to win a single one of the five significant battles he fought against the English between 1342 and 1364, although he proved more efficient at siegework and lengthy campaigns. The Breton nobility had now been given pause for thought in choosing their side in the ongoing war. Dagworth and Blois would meet in battle again, with the same result, at La Roche-Derrien the following year.
