= Saint-Pol-de-Léon =

Saint-Pol-de-Léon Kastell Paol (Breton)
- Commune
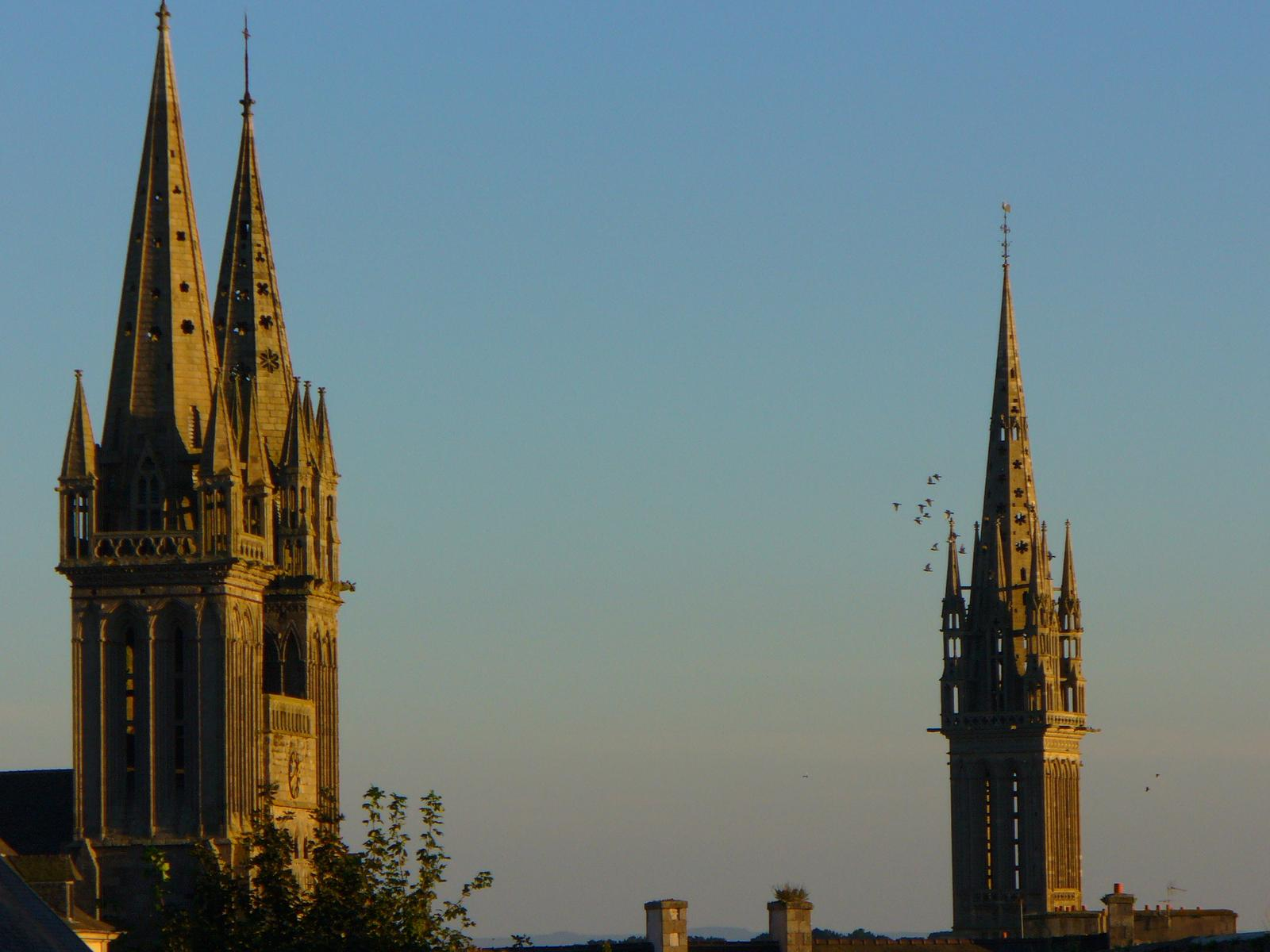
- The Saint-Pol-de-Léon Cathedral and Chapel

- Flag Coat of arms
- Location of Saint-Pol-de-Léon
- Location within France Location within Brittany
- Coordinates: 48°41′10″N 3°59′06″W
- Country: France
- Region: Brittany
- Department: Finistère
- Arrondissement: Morlaix
- Canton: Saint-Pol-de-Léon
- Intercommunality: Haut-Léon Communauté

Government
  - Mayor (2020–2026): Stéphane Cloarec
- Area^{1}: 23.43 km^{2} (9.05 sq mi)
- Highest elevation: 57 m (187 ft)
- Lowest elevation: 0 m (0 ft)
- Population (2023): 6,941
  - Density: 296.2/km^{2} (767.3/sq mi)
- Time zone: UTC+01:00 (CET)
  - Summer (DST): UTC+02:00 (CEST)
- INSEE/Postal code: 29259 /29250
- ^{1} French Land Register data, which excludes lakes, ponds, glaciers > 1 km^{2} (0.386 sq mi or 247 acres) and river estuaries.

Saint-Pol-de-Léon (French pronunciation: [sɛ̃ pɔl də leɔ̃]; Breton: Kastell-Paol) is a commune in the Finistère department in Brittany in north-western France, located on the coast.

It is noted for its 13th-century cathedral on the site of the original founded by Saint Paul Aurelian in the 6th century. It has kept a unique architecture, such as Notre-Dame du Kreisker Chapel, an 80 m high chapel, which is the highest in Brittany. It was also the scene of a battle during the Breton War of Succession, where the Montfortists and their English allies defeated an army led by Charles of Blois.

It is the largest vegetable producer and farmers market in Brittany responsible for 90% of French artichoke production and exports tens of thousands of vegetables to the whole of Europe every year.

== Population ==
Inhabitants of Saint-Pol-de-Léon are called Saintpolitains.

Historical population

Year	Pop.	±% p.a.
1793	4,832	—
1800	5,385	+1.56%
1806	5,543	+0.48%
1821	6,155	+0.70%
1831	6,692	+0.84%
1836	6,451	−0.73%
1841	6,655	+0.62%
1846	6,836	+0.54%
1851	7,059	+0.64%
1856	6,605	−1.32%
1861	6,704	+0.30%
1866	6,771	+0.20%
1872	6,741	−0.07%
1876	7,005	+0.97%
1881	7,295	+0.81%
1886	7,480	+0.50%
1891	7,430	−0.13%
1896	7,619	+0.50%
1901	7,846	+0.59%

Year	Pop.	±% p.a.
1906	8,140	+0.74%
1911	7,809	−0.83%
1921	7,439	−0.48%
1926	7,844	+1.07%
1931	8,041	+0.50%
1936	8,347	+0.75%
1946	8,903	+0.65%
1954	8,585	−0.45%
1962	8,347	−0.35%
1968	8,044	−0.61%
1975	8,044	+0.00%
1982	7,462	−1.07%
1990	7,261	−0.34%
1999	7,121	−0.22%
2007	7,053	−0.12%
2012	6,711	−0.99%
2017	6,596	−0.35%
2023	6,941	+0.85%

Source: EHESS and INSEE (1968-2023)

== History ==
The city takes its present name of one of the legendary founder saints of Brittany: Saint Paul Aurelian. The Latin name given to the entire region is now the Leon ("Pays Léonard"). It was long the seat of a bishop, now merged into the Roman Catholic Diocese of Quimper. The city later became a sort of religious capital.

=== Gallo-Roman walls ===
A double stone-alley, quite well preserved, is the last remains of prehistoric population on Saint Pol site. Several vestiges demonstrate a Roman military presence in the 3rd century. Based on ancient writings, Saint Pol would have then been enclosed by extraordinary high moated walls.

=== 14th century ===
Battle of St Pol de Léon

=== Religious centre ===
As of the 6th century, the monastery site became an episcopate named "Kastell Paol". The city then extended beyond its walls. In the 15th century, Saint Pol de Léon is a famous spiritual and cultural centre. The Pempoul harbour is at its rise. Fortified doors protected the 2000 inhabitants until the 18th century. During the 18th century, the bishops of Léon strongly influenced the architectural style of the city. A new episcopal house was erected in 1706 and extended in 1750. The seminary dates from 1708, the catholic college from 1788.

=== French Revolution ===
During the French Revolution the city lost the episcopate, a rich chapter, a college, 3 religious communities, a retirement house and 15 religious houses. Then started 100 years of economical decline. "Today Saint Pol de Léon is a dead city" was Flaubert's assessment in 1847.

=== 19th and 20th centuries ===
As of 1883, the railway contributed to the considerable expansion of the agricultural production. In 1890 Saint Pol de Léon became the main commercial centre in France for vegetable exportation. Nowadays, the region is still the strongest concentration for horticultural production and transformation.

== Sights ==
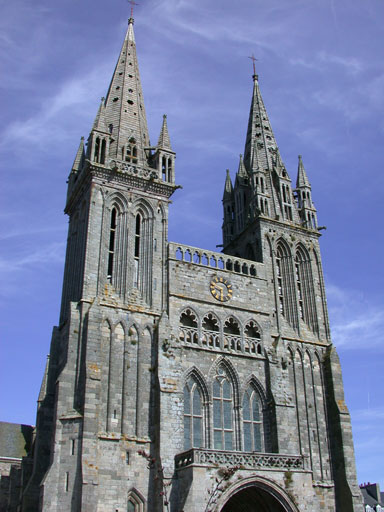
The Saint-Paul-Aurélien Cathedral

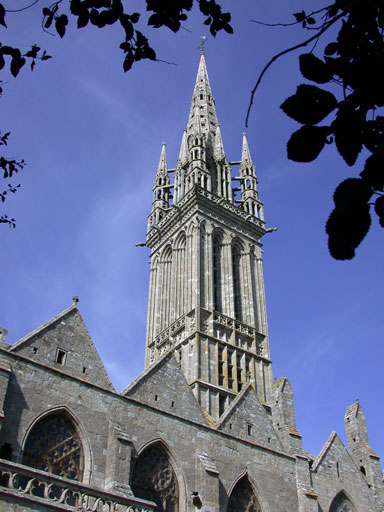
The Kreisker chapel

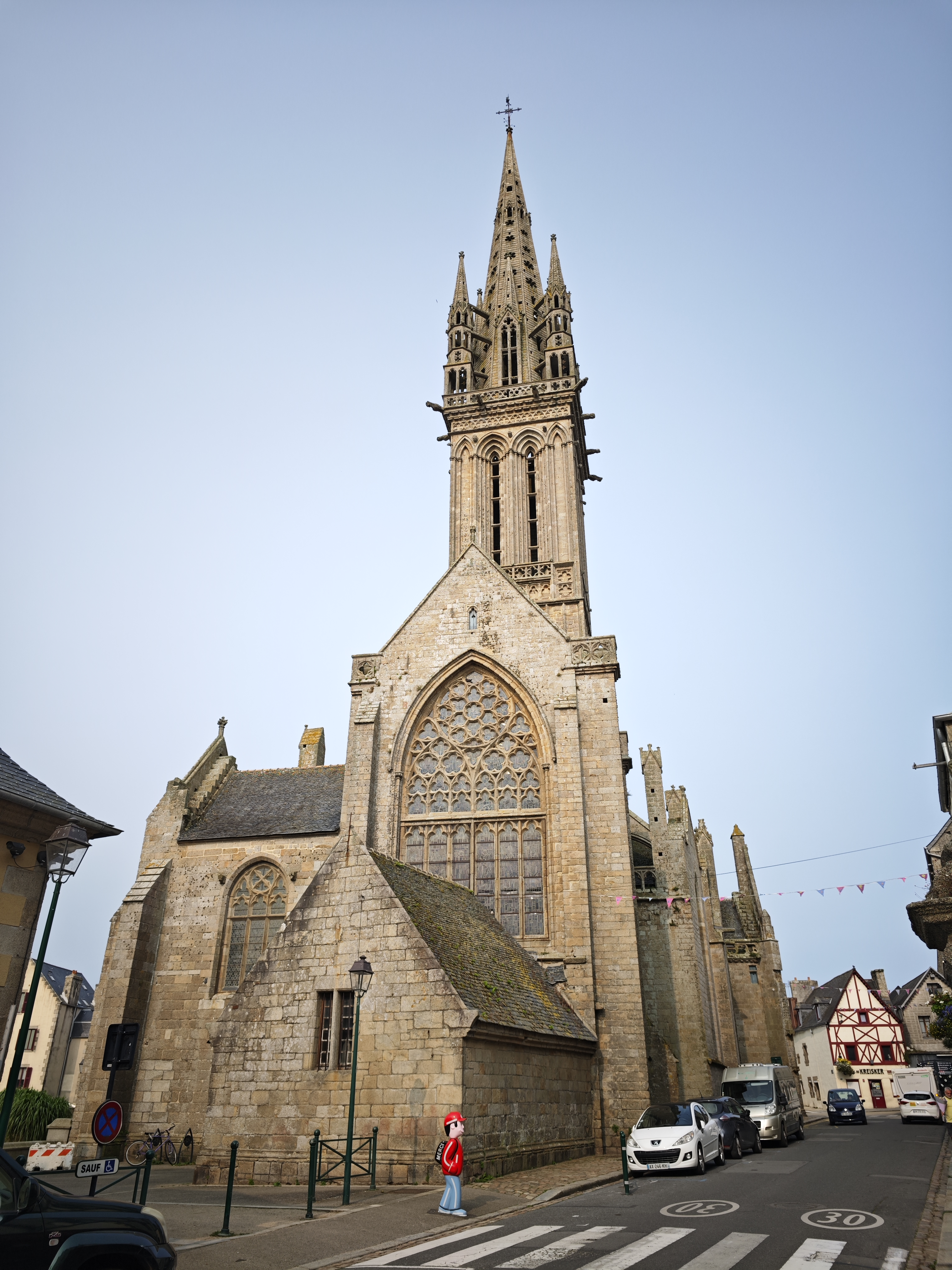

- Kreisker chapel, 14th and 15th centuries, is the highest steeple in all Brittany. Norman and British influences are visible on the architecture of this classified historic monument.
- The Saint Paul Aurélien cathedral, with its Roman remains is also a testimony of the influence of Norman artistic style on Breton architecture in the 13th century. organ Dallam (17th century)
- Townhall, built in 1706, the new Episcopal palace, these days the town hall, was extended in 1750. In the town hall there is a monumental staircase ornamented with some paintings from the Louvre Museum.
- The Prebendal house, built for a rich canon whose income, the "Prébendes" came from taxes, this exceptional house of the 16th century is of Breton Renaissance style.
- Kéroulas manor. This small castle was erected for a noble canon around 1520. Its lay-out and decoration are a perfect example of the architectural style of Renaissance, as in most rural mansions around Saint Pol.
- The St-Joseph chapel was built in 1846 to serve as a place of worship for the adjoining newly opened retirement home giving lodging to the elderly priests of the diocese. The church tower, 33m high, comes from the former Ursulines convent founded in 1630.
- The St-Pierre chapel, formerly a parish church, which towers above the cemetery boasts a 15th-century nave. Designed originally in the shape of a Latin cross, its two wings were removed in the 17th century.
- Megalith of Boutouiller.
- Kernevez castle and park
- Kersaliou castle
- Laundries

== Coast ==
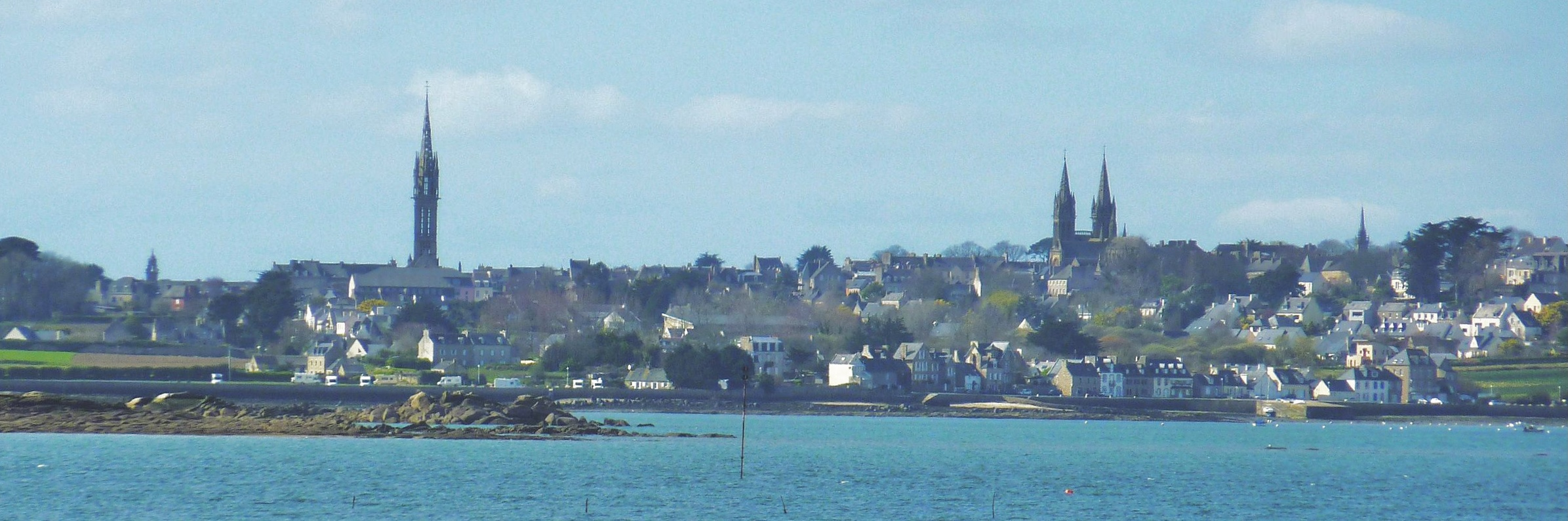

Scattered over 13 kilometres of coast line, some of the beaches, creeks and strands of St Pol de Léon have names such as "Tahiti", "Petit-Nice", and "Sainte-Anne". They can be seen from the panoramic viewpoint of the "Champ de la Rive" municipal park, which is overhung by a mission cross erected in 1901. The panorama includes a view of the North-Finistère. A coastal footpath offers views of the Channel, the Bloscon deep harbour of Roscoff, and Callot island with its chapel near Carantec. The boats, many of which are of traditional construction, lie there awaiting the tide. The sailing school at the end of the "Groue" pier offers multiple sea activities for beginners or experienced users.

=== St. Anne islet ===
The Sainte-Anne islet a listed natural site and hermitage of the White Friars until the 18th century, the gigantic rock on the site, was once armed with cannons. Natural preserved site, where nothing remains of the chapel built in 1640. It is linked to the continent by natural bank of sand and pebbles, tarmacked in the 1970s. The "Groue" is the sediment strand which links the coast to the Sainte Anne island, forming the bay of Pempoul with its ashore harbour. The islet always played an essential role in the protection of the bay and the harbour of Pempoul.

== Breton language ==
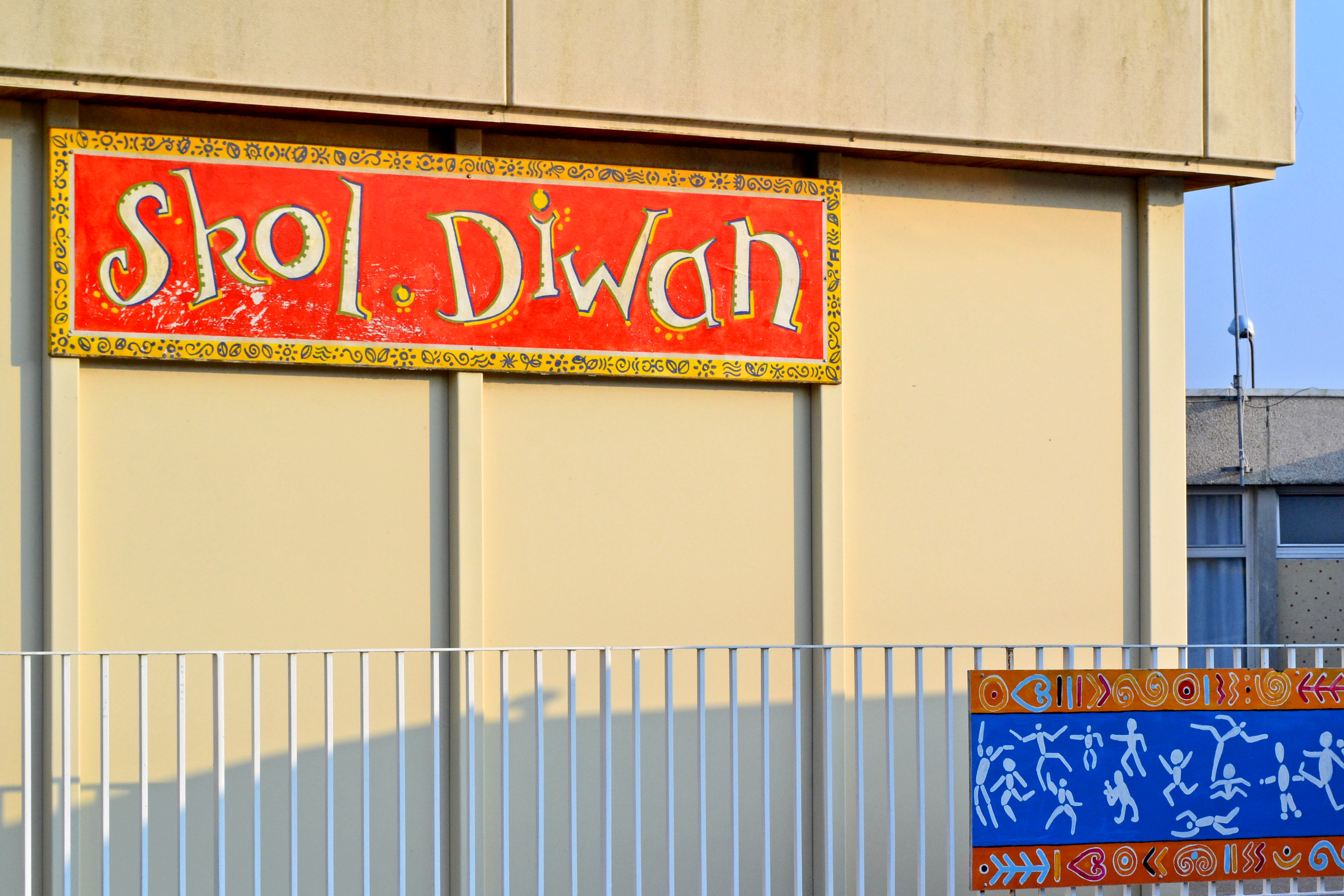
Skol Diwan, Breton primary school

- The municipality launched a linguistic plan through Ya d'ar brezhoneg on 2 December 2008.
- In 2008, 19.67% of primary-school children attended bilingual schools.

== Notable people ==
- Goulven of Léon, saint and bishop
- Gérard Jaffrès (born 1956), musician, singer, songwriter
- Louis Floch (born 1947), soccer player
- Jean-Gilles du Coëtlosquet (1770–1784), bishop
- Romuald Figuier (born 1941), singer
- Fanny Raoul (1771-1833), feminist writer, journalist, philosopher and essayist
- Bleuniadur, traditional group of dance and music

== International relations ==
Saint-Pol-de-Léon is twinned with

- Penarth, Wales, United Kingdom
- Vechta, Germany

== Climate ==
Climate data for Saint-Pol-de-Léon/Sibiril (1981–2010 normals, extremes 1988–present)
Month	Jan	Feb	Mar	Apr	May	Jun	Jul	Aug	Sep	Oct	Nov	Dec	Year
Record high °C (°F)	17.1 (62.8)	22.3 (72.1)	23.9 (75.0)	28.4 (83.1)	30.4 (86.7)	34.4 (93.9)	34.0 (93.2)	33.7 (92.7)	31.4 (88.5)	29.3 (84.7)	20.7 (69.3)	18.3 (64.9)	34.4 (93.9)
Mean daily maximum °C (°F)	9.7 (49.5)	10.2 (50.4)	11.9 (53.4)	13.1 (55.6)	16.3 (61.3)	18.7 (65.7)	20.5 (68.9)	20.8 (69.4)	19.0 (66.2)	16.0 (60.8)	12.4 (54.3)	9.9 (49.8)	14.9 (58.8)
Daily mean °C (°F)	7.2 (45.0)	7.4 (45.3)	8.7 (47.7)	9.7 (49.5)	12.7 (54.9)	15.0 (59.0)	16.9 (62.4)	17.1 (62.8)	15.3 (59.5)	12.8 (55.0)	9.7 (49.5)	7.4 (45.3)	11.7 (53.1)
Mean daily minimum °C (°F)	4.7 (40.5)	4.7 (40.5)	5.6 (42.1)	6.3 (43.3)	9.2 (48.6)	11.3 (52.3)	13.2 (55.8)	13.4 (56.1)	11.6 (52.9)	9.7 (49.5)	6.9 (44.4)	4.9 (40.8)	8.5 (47.3)
Record low °C (°F)	−6.7 (19.9)	−6.9 (19.6)	−3.0 (26.6)	−1.9 (28.6)	1.4 (34.5)	4.4 (39.9)	7.1 (44.8)	6.6 (43.9)	4.0 (39.2)	−2.0 (28.4)	−2.5 (27.5)	−6.0 (21.2)	−6.9 (19.6)
Average precipitation mm (inches)	102.4 (4.03)	91.0 (3.58)	63.2 (2.49)	74.4 (2.93)	62.8 (2.47)	49.3 (1.94)	54.5 (2.15)	50.6 (1.99)	58.3 (2.30)	91.8 (3.61)	111.7 (4.40)	113.6 (4.47)	923.6 (36.36)
Average precipitation days (≥ 1.0 mm)	15.0	14.1	12.1	12.1	10.1	8.3	9.3	9.0	9.4	14.6	17.1	16.0	147.0
Source: Meteociel

== See also ==
- Communes of the Finistère department
- St. Leon, British Columbia#Name origin
