= Milton Organ =

17th-century instrument in Tewkesbury Abbey, Gloucestershire

The Milton Organ is a 17th-century instrument in Tewkesbury Abbey, Gloucestershire, which has been relocated several times.

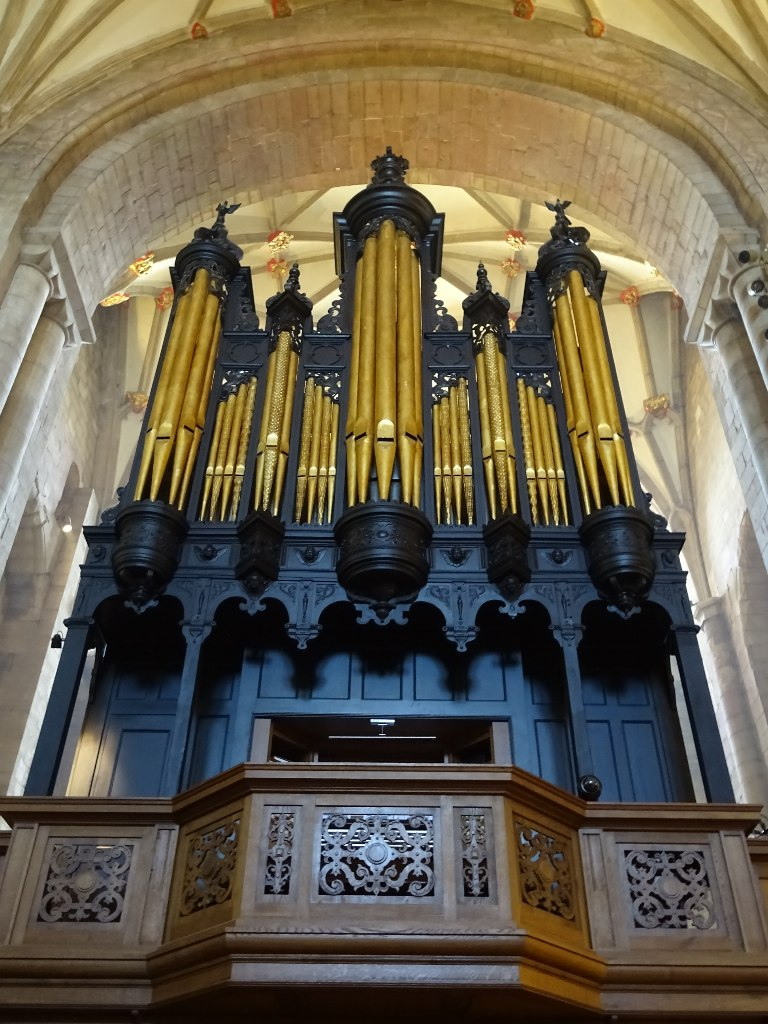
The Milton Organ

It was made for Magdalen College, Oxford at the beginning of the 1630s. The builder was Robert Dallam of the Dallam family of organ builders. It may have been the first organ Robert built independently, as his father Thomas Dallam died around 1630.

After the English Civil War it was removed to the chapel of Hampton Court Palace, where Oliver Cromwell took up residence. The poet Milton may have played the instrument at this location before it was returned to Magdalen College as a result of the Stuart Restoration. It came to Tewkesbury in 1737. Since then, it has undergone several major rebuilds, but still has its Dallam case. A specification of the organ can be found on the National Pipe Organ Register.
