= Lanvellec =

Lanvellec Lanvaeleg
- Commune
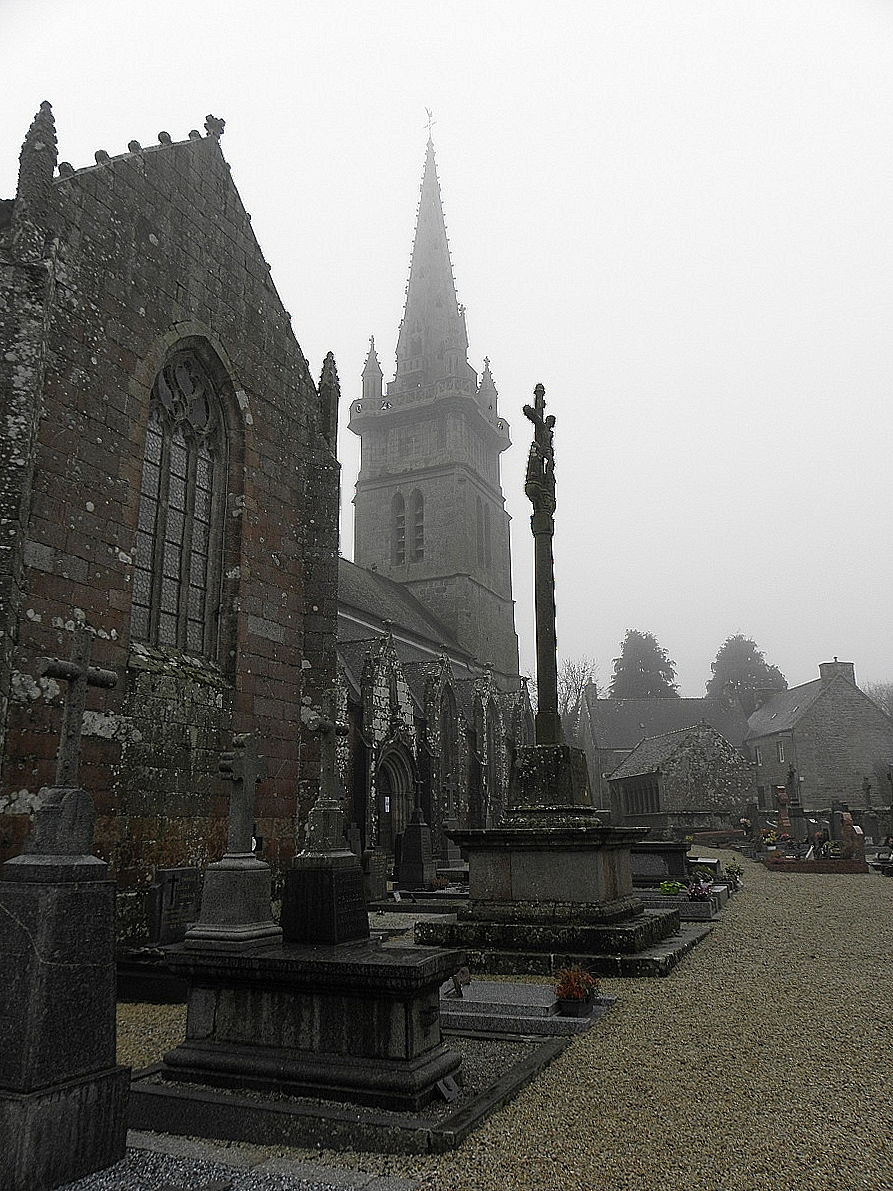
- The church of Lanvellec
- Location of Lanvellec
- Location within France Location within Brittany
- Coordinates: 48°37′11″N 3°32′06″W
- Country: France
- Region: Brittany
- Department: Côtes-d'Armor
- Arrondissement: Lannion
- Canton: Plestin-les-Grèves
- Intercommunality: Lannion-Trégor Communauté

Government
  - Mayor (2020–2026): François Prigent
- Area^{1}: 18.92 km^{2} (7.31 sq mi)
- Highest elevation: 219 m (719 ft)
- Lowest elevation: 40 m (130 ft)
- Population (2023): 608
  - Density: 32.1/km^{2} (83.2/sq mi)
- Time zone: UTC+01:00 (CET)
  - Summer (DST): UTC+02:00 (CEST)
- INSEE/Postal code: 22119 /22420
- ^{1} French Land Register data, which excludes lakes, ponds, glaciers > 1 km^{2} (0.386 sq mi or 247 acres) and river estuaries.

Lanvellec (French pronunciation: [lɑ̃vɛlɛk]; Breton: Lanvaeleg) is a commune in the Côtes-d'Armor department of Brittany in north-western France.

== Culture ==
The commune has a rich architectural and cultural heritage. The parish church of Saint-Brandan was rebuilt between 1852 and 1868. Within it, are some interesting items, including an organ, built in 1653 by the famous English organ builder, Robert Dallam. The organ fell into disrepair in the last century but was given historical monument status in 1971. Its restoration by the Italian organ builder, Formentelli, was aided by the mysterious recent reappearance of the 150 pipes belonging to it.

Numerous musical events take place in the commune throughout the year, in particular the Festival de musique ancienne de Lanvellec in the autumn.

The Gothic ossuary dating from the fifteenth century is situated in the graveyard beside the church. It is one of the finest in Côtes-d'Armor.

The charmingly-situated chapel of Saint-Goulven, dating from the seventeenth century, possesses a coloured reredos, representing the Last Supper in relief. Its font dates from 1652. The chapel of Saint-Maudez, dating from the beginning of the 16th century, features a handsome entrance in the form of an accolade, as well as unusual gargoyles.

The principal attractions of the chapel of Saint-Carré (or Notre Dame de Pitié) is its bell-tower, its external oratory beneath the porch, the two pillars of the gate to the parish church enclosure as well as a font dating from 1700. The chapel itself dates from 1696.

The chapel of Saint-Connay has a nearby roadside calvary. The chapel itself is a small rectangular building with 14th century fenestration within its south side. The north side and the chevet date from the seventeenth century.

The imposing château de Rosanbo was built around 1500 and is situated in a French-style park, designed by Lenotre. It can be visited between Easter and September. It has a noteworthy kitchen, guardroom, dining room, hall and library. The château contains important items of furniture as well as Gobelin tapestries.

The Breton singer Denez Prigent owns a house in Lanvellec commune.

== Population ==
Historical population
Year	Pop.	±% p.a.
1968	649	—
1975	582	−1.54%
1982	590	+0.20%
1990	594	+0.08%
1999	537	−1.11%
2007	549	+0.28%
2012	564	+0.54%
2017	596	+1.11%
2023	608	+0.33%
Source: INSEE

Inhabitants of Lanvellec are called lanvellecois in French.

== See also ==
- Communes of the Côtes-d'Armor department
