= Thomas Dallam =

English organ builder (born 1575)

Thomas Dallam (bap. 1575, d. in or after 1630) was an English organ-builder and diarist.

== Life ==
Thomas Dallam was baptised at Flixton, Lancashire, on 1 May 1575, probably the son of Thomas Dalham, who was an itinerant blacksmith. Between about 1589 and about 1596 he served an apprenticeship in organ building under the aegis of the Blacksmiths' Company of London. He then became a liveryman.

Dallam married soon after 1600; his wife's name is unknown. They had six children. The eldest son Robert Dallam became an organ builder and Robert's sons in turn also became organ builders: Thomas (c.1630), Ralph (d. 1673) and George (d. 1684) One daughter, Catherine, by her marriage to the organ builder Thomas Harris, was the mother of the organ builder Renatus Harris.

== Organ builder ==
Thomas Dallam's work as an organ builder consolidated the two-manual 'double organ' with twelve to fourteen flue stops (without reeds, mixtures, or pedals) as the norm for English cathedrals and for larger collegiate churches during the period before the English Civil War.

- c.1599: For the Ottoman Sultan Mehmet III, a mechanical organ and clock that could be played manually or played the hours using clockwork. This was the gift of Queen Elizabeth I.
- 1605–6: King’s College, Cambridge.
- 1607–8: Norwich Cathedral.
- 1609–10: St George’s Chapel, Windsor.
- 1613: Worcester Cathedral (to the scheme of Thomas Tomkins).
- 1613–14: Eton College.
- c.1615: Holyrood Palace, Edinburgh (case by Inigo Jones).
- c.1617: St John’s College, Oxford.
- 1620: Wells Cathedral.
- 1620: All Saints, Wakefield.
- 1621: Durham Cathedral.
- 1629: Bristol Cathedral (Robert Dallam).

The legacy of surviving instruments is minimal, because much of his work was destroyed by people hostile to church organs following the outbreak of the English Civil War.
