= List of works of the two Folgoët ateliers =

The work of the atelier "Le grand atelier ducal du Folgoët" (Note: Le grand atelier ducal du Folgoët is called "ducal" because of the patronage which came from Brittany's ruling family (the atelier was active during the reigns of John V, Duke of Brittany, Francis I, Duke of Brittany, Peter II, Duke of Brittany, Arthur III, Duke of Brittany and Francis II, Duke of Brittany).)—one of the two main workshops, with the other being the "atelier cornouaillais du Maître de Tronoën" (Note: See Listing of the works of the atelier of the Maître de Tronoën.), that emerged during the veritable "golden age" of carving in stone in 15th-century Brittany, considered a marked renaissance, after little activity in the 13th and 14th centuries—can be broken down into two sections, the so-called "first atelier" (active 1423–1468) and "second atelier" (active 1458–1509).

The article will deal with each of these two workshops. For ease of reference, the first atelier's work has been divided into sections:

1. work on porches in either granite or kersanton stone, calvaries, flagstones/effigies for tombs (gisant), statues, and
2. some miscellaneous items.

The second atelier section deals with the porch of the Église Saint-Herbot in Plonévez-du-Faou and the Église at Plourac'h.

== The Église Notre-Dame at Le Folgoët ==
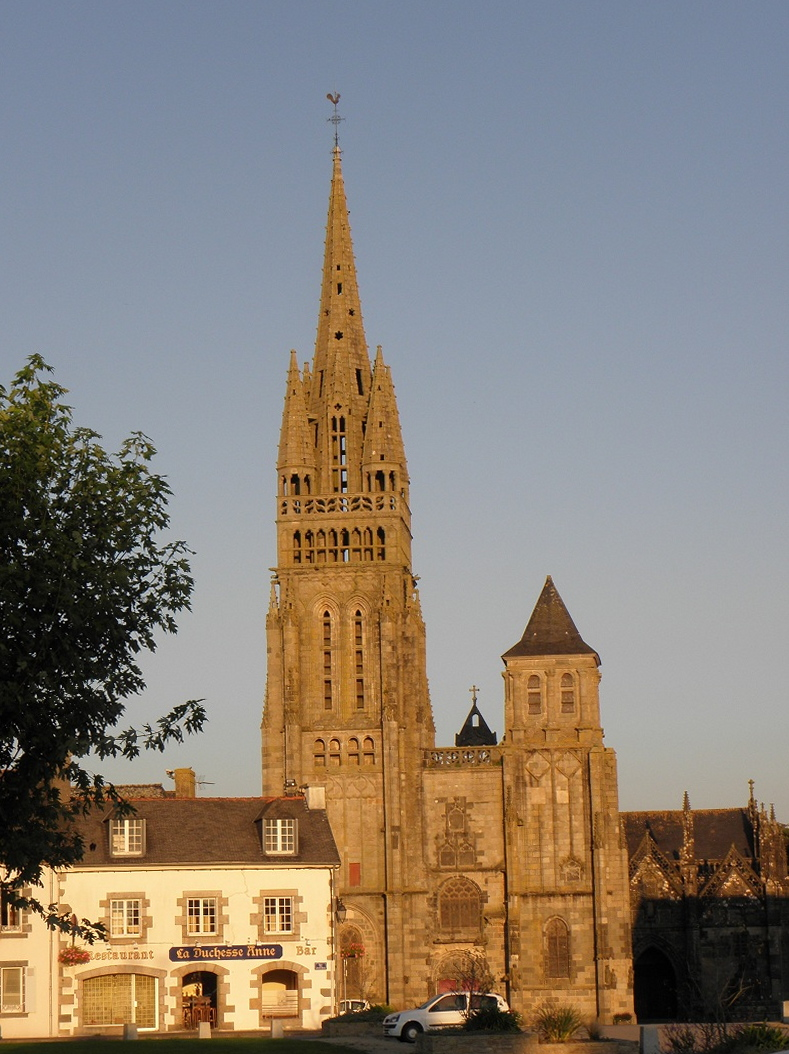
View of the western façade of the Basilique Notre-Dame du Folgoët in Finistère

What started as the "Chapelle du Folgoët" originated in the reign of John IV, the foundations being laid from 1350 to 1360 but it was during the reign of John V, Duke of Brittany that real progress was made between 1420 and 1422 and in 1423, the Duke founded the chapel college. This is marked by an inscription over the west porch reading "JOHAANES ILLVSTRISSIMVS DVX B(R)ITONVM FVNDAVIT PRAESZE(N)S C(OL)LEGIVM ANNO D(OMI)NI.CCCC.XX.111". Work here was the atelier's first major commission and the carvings are amongst the atelier's best known works.

=== The nave entrance/portal ===
This entrance leads to the nave. It has double doors and in a niche in the trumeau is a statue of Alain, the Bishop of Léon. The entrance suffered damage in the 1708 fire but has been restored.

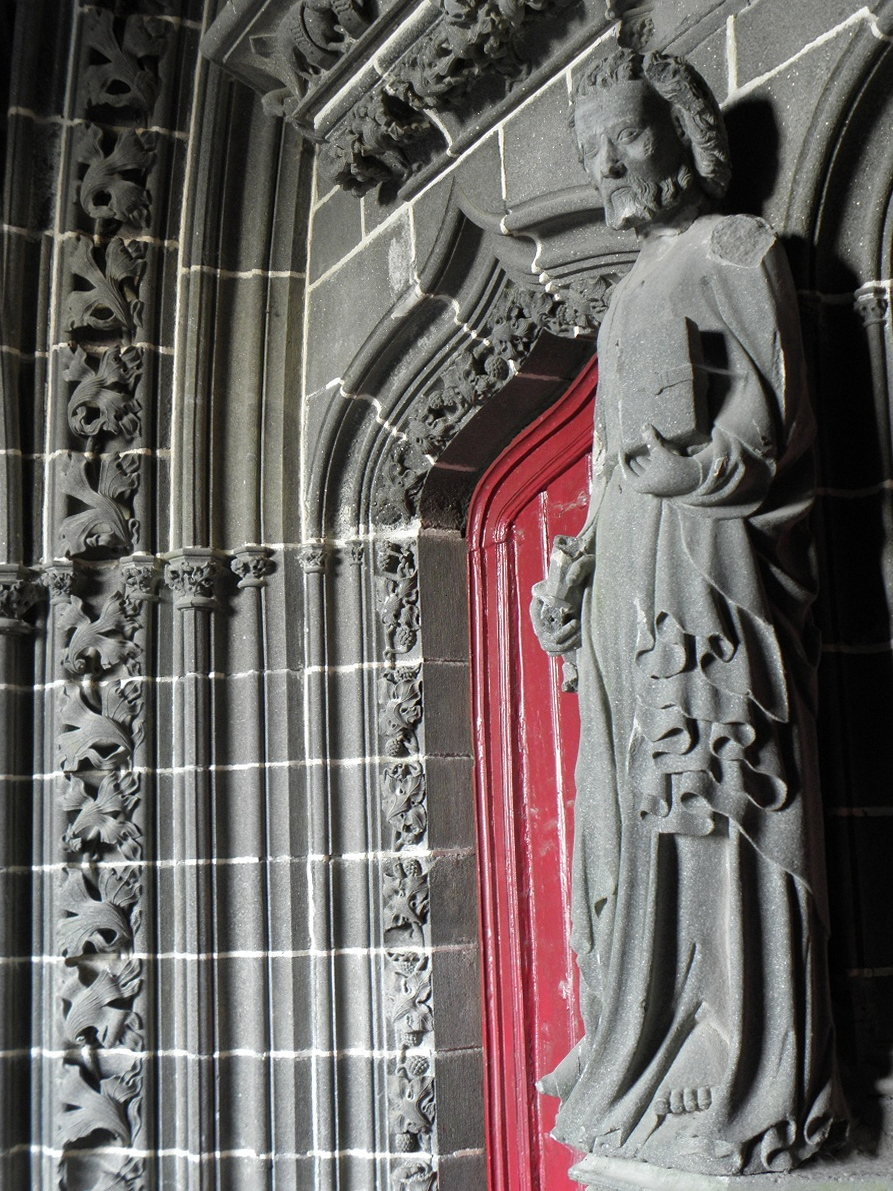
Bishop Alain in the nave entrance trumeau

=== The south entrance/portal ===
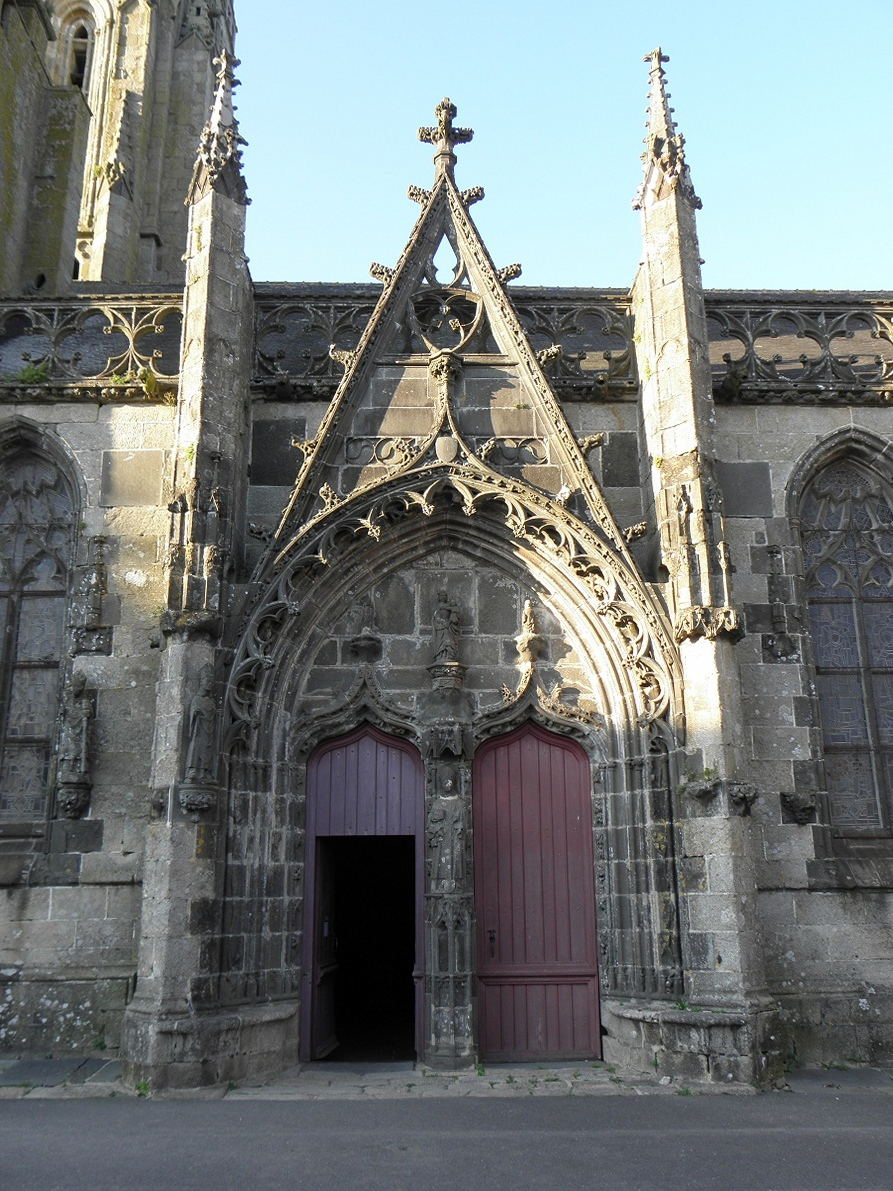
The south entrance with bishop in the trumeau and the Virgin Mary with child in the tympanum. Note the second bishop to the left on the entrance

This entrance features three of the bishops mentioned below and a tympanum with a depiction of the Virgin Mary with child.

=== The "porche des Apôtres" and the gable of the sacristy ===
At the entrance to this porch, the "porche des Apôtres", so called because it holds statues of the apostles, there is a small statue on the right side bearing a scroll which reads "B(IE)N SOIEZ VE(N)US" and on the left a statue depicting an old man stroking his beard. In a niche in the porch's left side buttress there is a statue of Margaret the Virgin slaying a dragon and in niches in the buttress on the right side are statues of Saint Christopher carrying the baby Jesus on his shoulders, of the Virgin Mary with child and Jean V. In the two doored entrance to the basilica itself at the far end of the porch there is a statue of Saint Peter in the trumeau, the saint seeming to preside over the other apostles whose statues adorn each side of the porch interior.

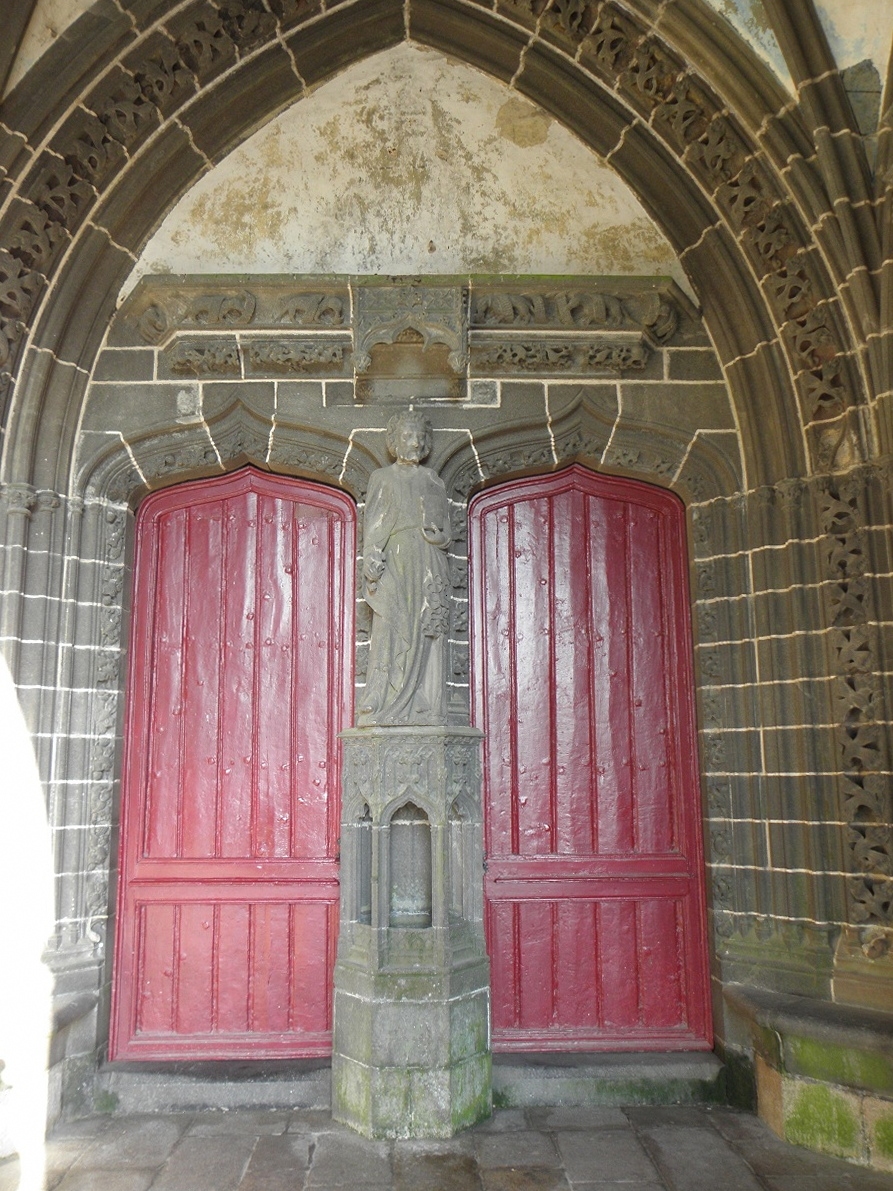
Saint Peter's statue in the trumeau of the "porche des Apôtres"

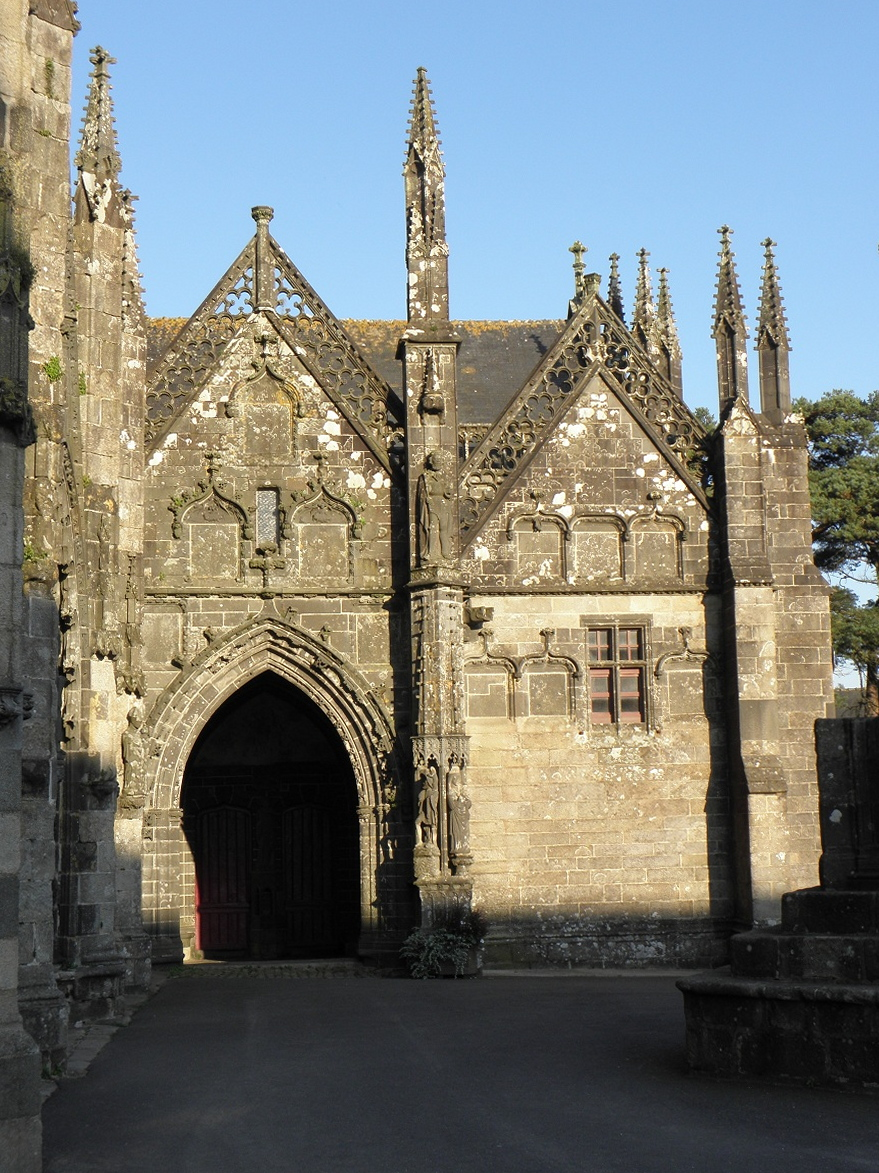
The "Porche des Apôtres"

=== The west porch ===
The west porch suffered badly from the fire of 1708 and the carving in the tympanum was damaged. This carving featured scenes depicting the Nativity, the Adoration of the Magi and the Adoration of the Shepherds. There is a sculpture depicting Saint Michael fighting the dragon to the left of the west porch entrance.

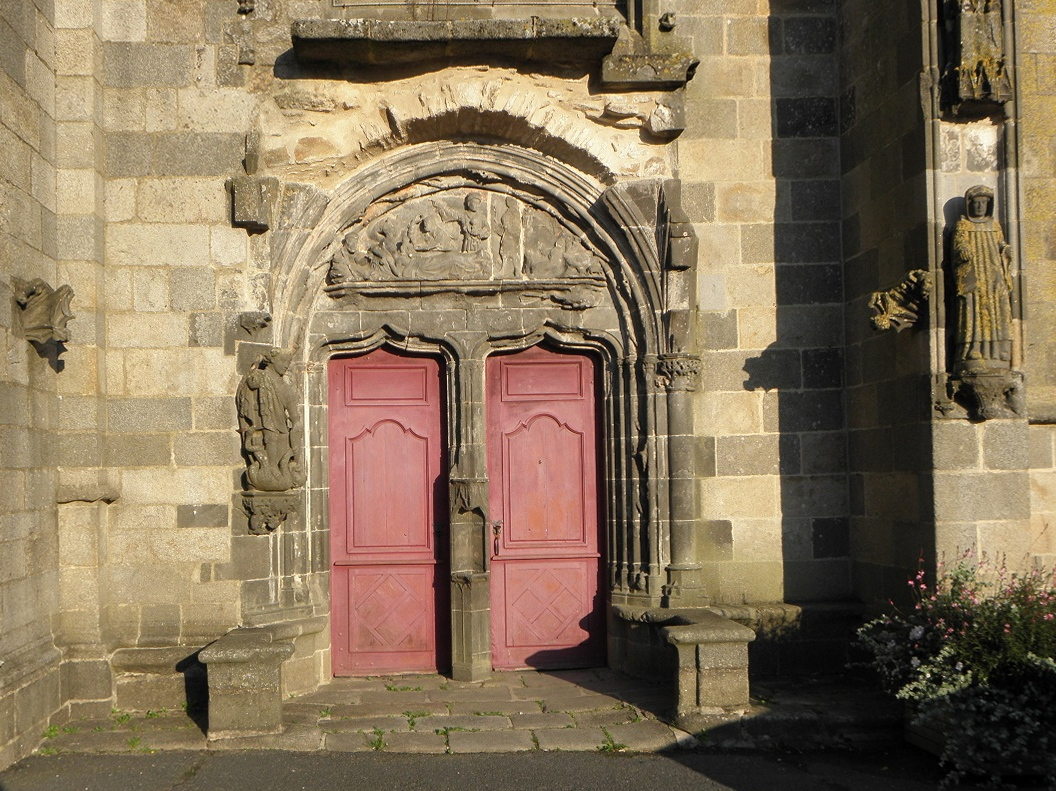
The double doored west porch with tympanum

.

=== The south façade ===
On the church's south façade are depictions of four saints in the attire of a bishop. The first is on the right side of the second window, The second is in the niche to the left of the south entrance, the third in the trumeau of the south entrance and the fourth in a niche in the right side buttress of the south entrance.

=== The north entrance/portal ===
This entrance has little decoration.

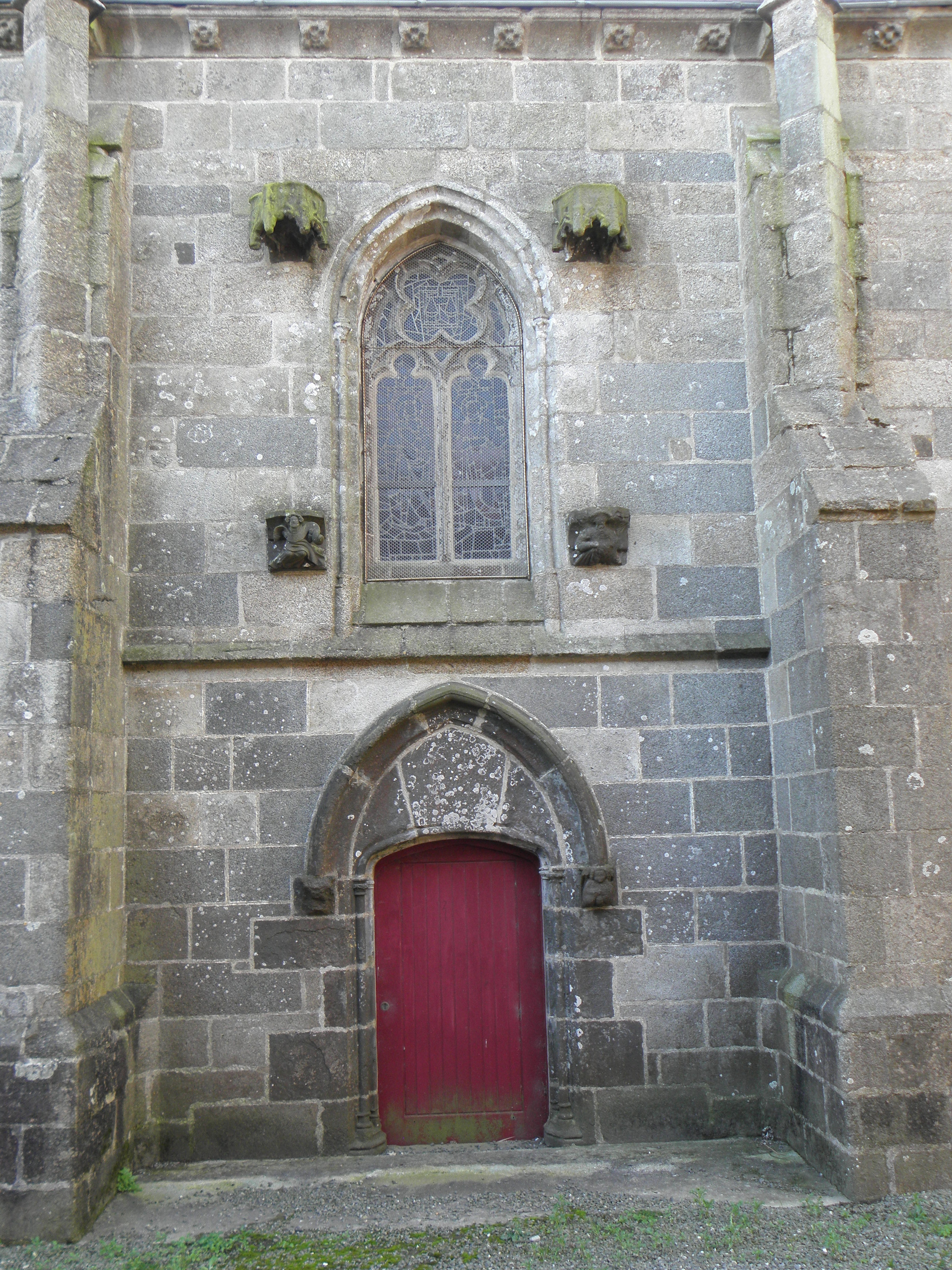
The north entrance to the Le Folgoët Basilica

=== The interior ===
Inside the church are statues by the atelier of John the Evangelist, John the Baptist, Margaret the Virgin and Catherine of Alexandria, and the "Autel des Anges" (the altar of the angels) decorated with carvings of angels.

=== The fountain ===
The fountain has its source beneath the main altar inside the basilica and it emerges by the chevet. The fountain comprises a statue of the Virgin Mary within an elaborate arcade. This arcade was restored in 1999. The statue of Mary is a copy, the original now being kept inside the basilica. It is much eroded after so many years exposure to the elements.

=== Images of the atelier's work in the Église Notre-Dame at Le Folgoët ===
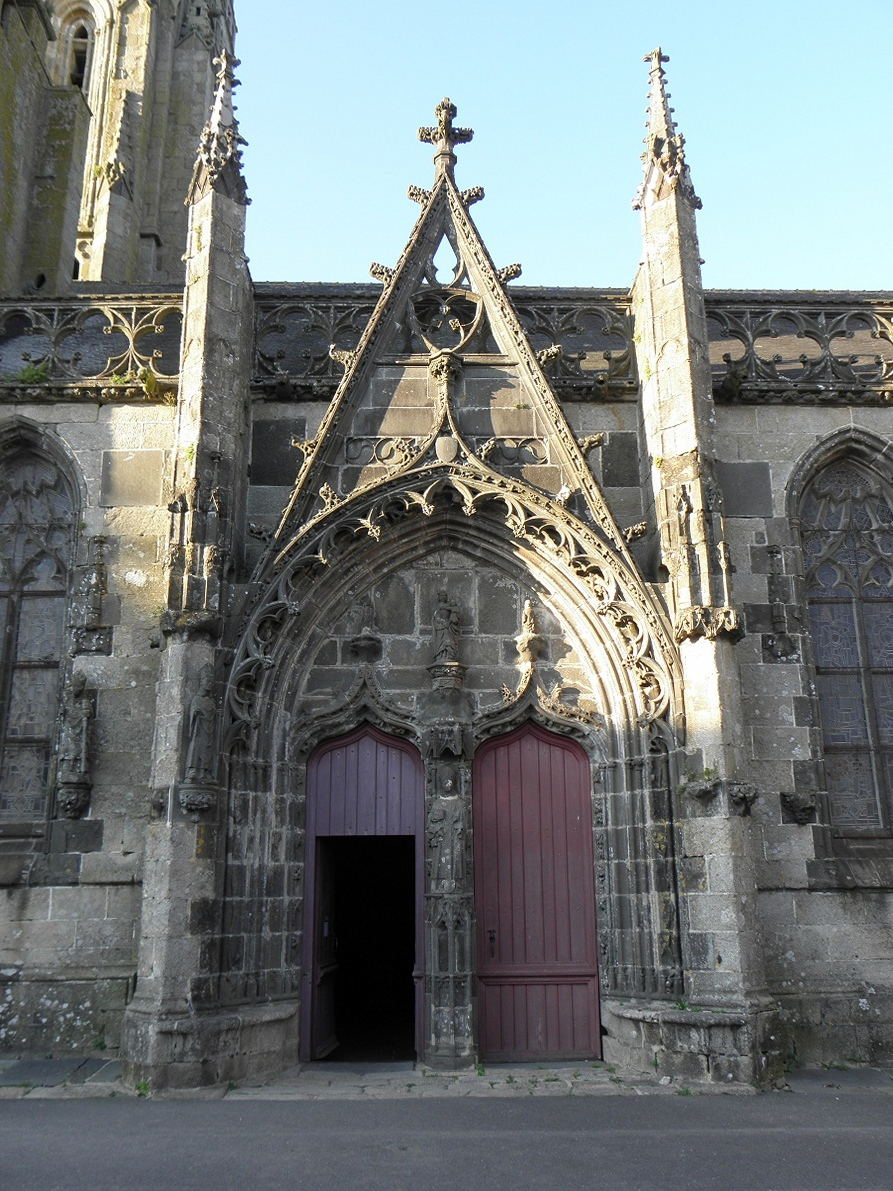
The south portal with statue of a bishop in the trumeau.

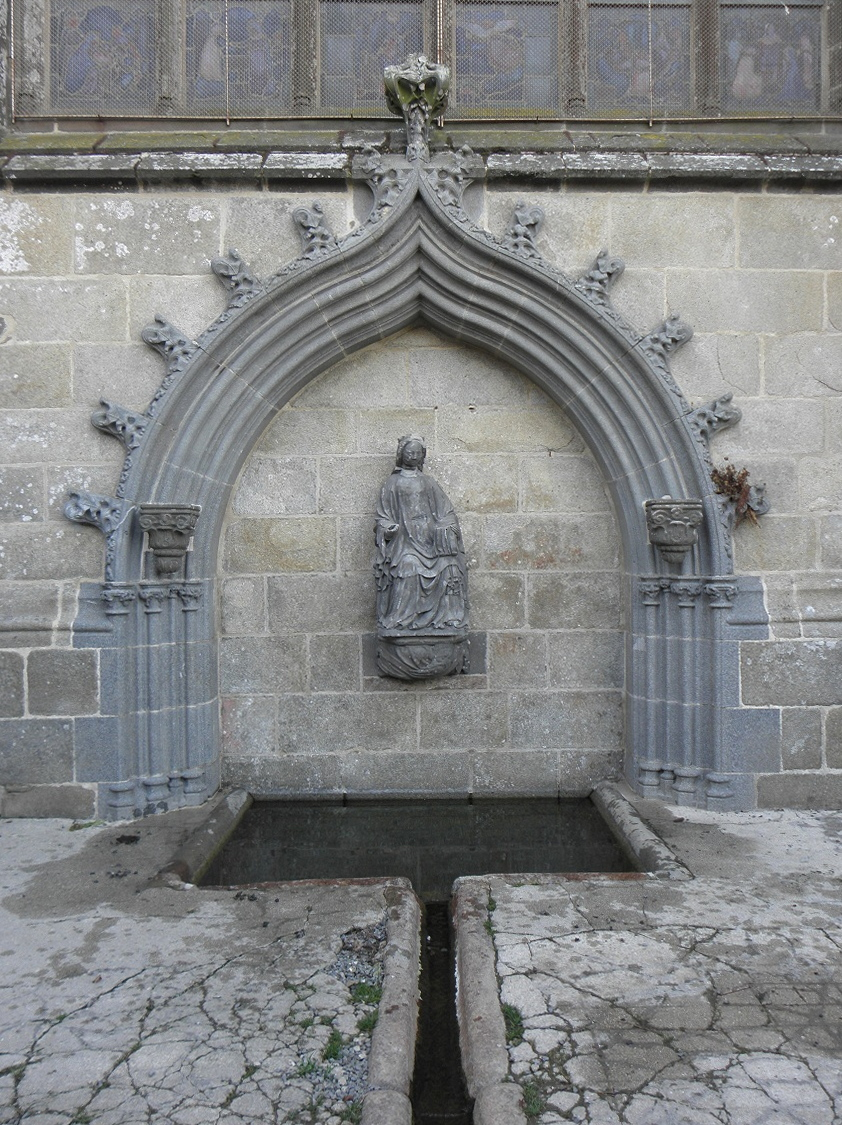
The fountain of the Basilica Notre-Dame du Folgoët

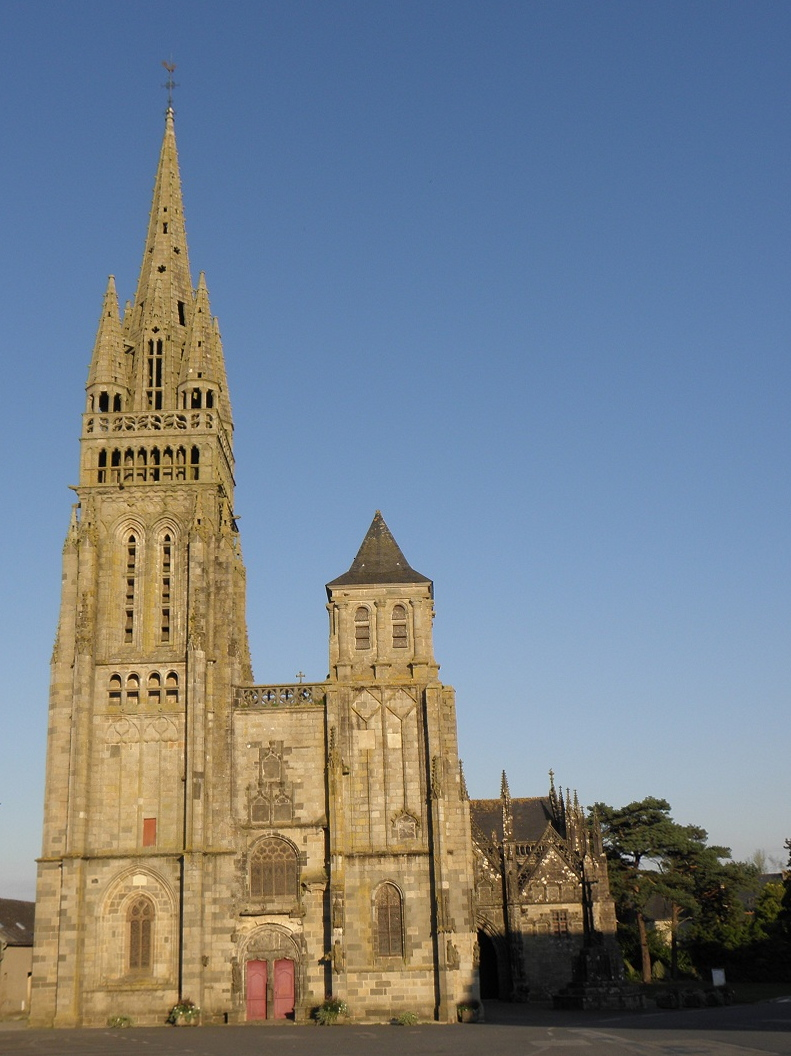
View of the Le Folgoët Basilica

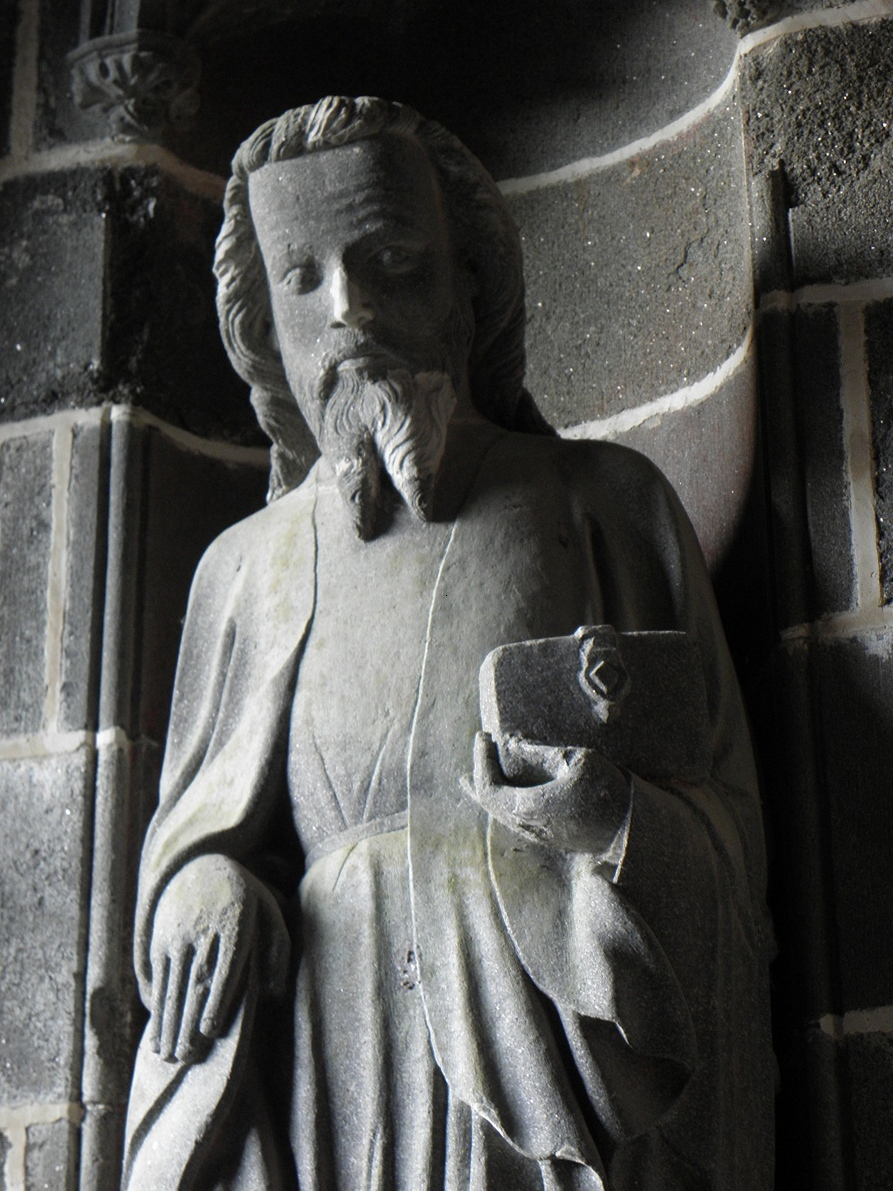
One of the statues of the apostles in the interior of the "porche des Apôtres"

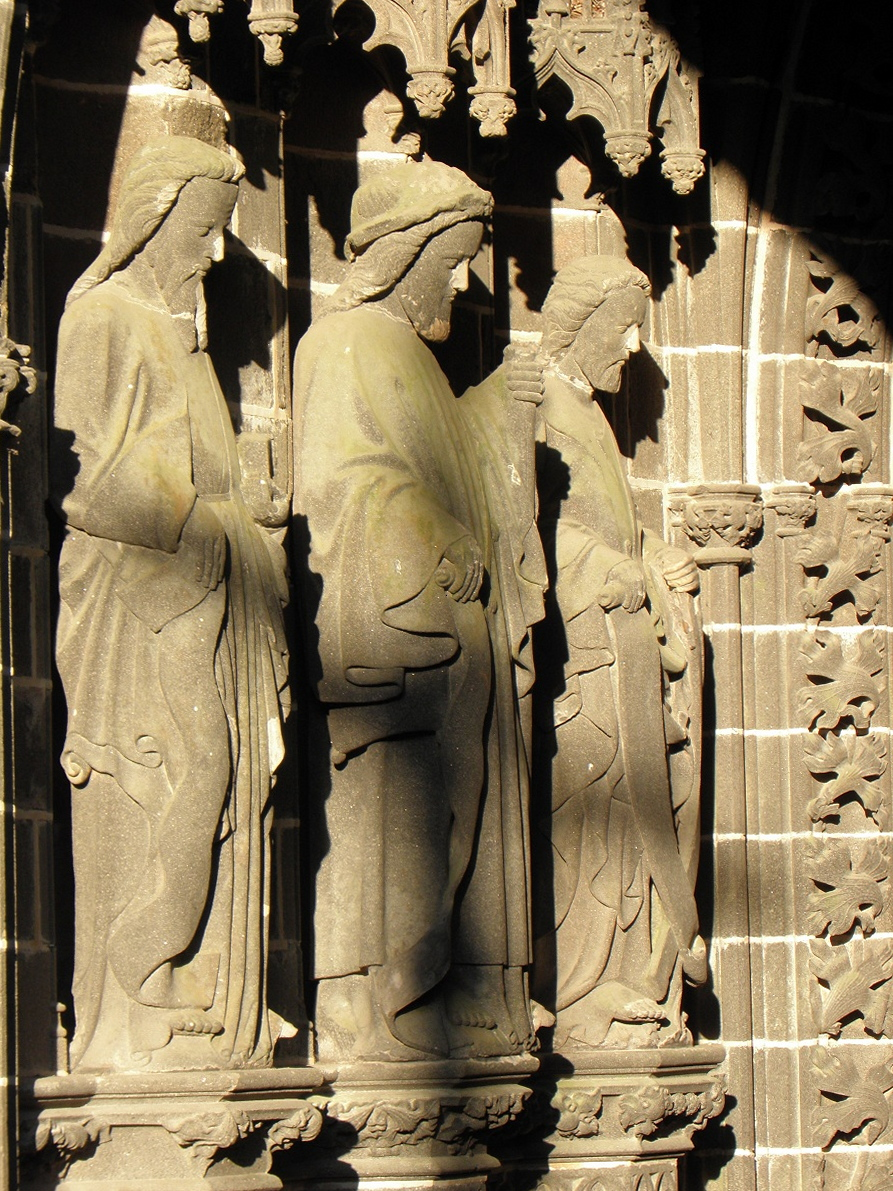
Another view of the statues of the apostles in the interior of the "porche des Apôtres"

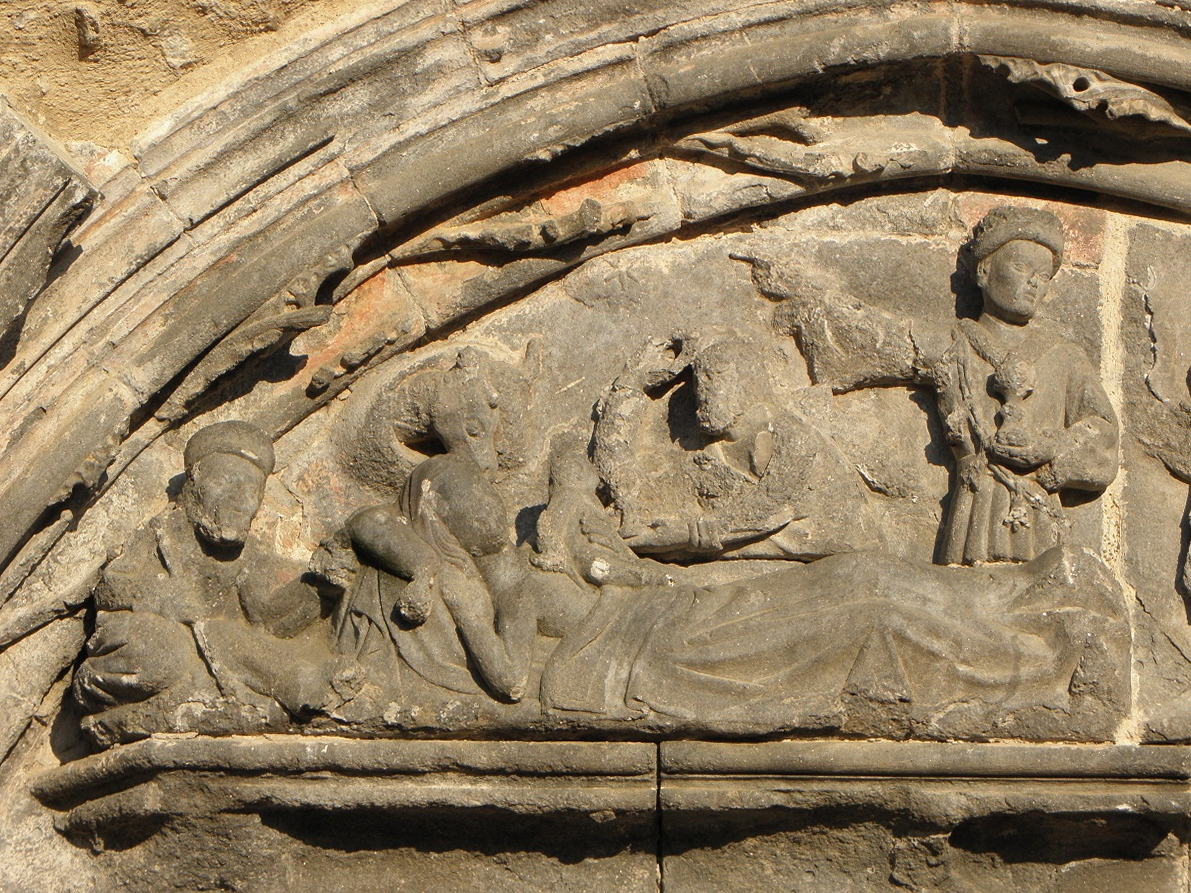
Part of the west portal tympanum

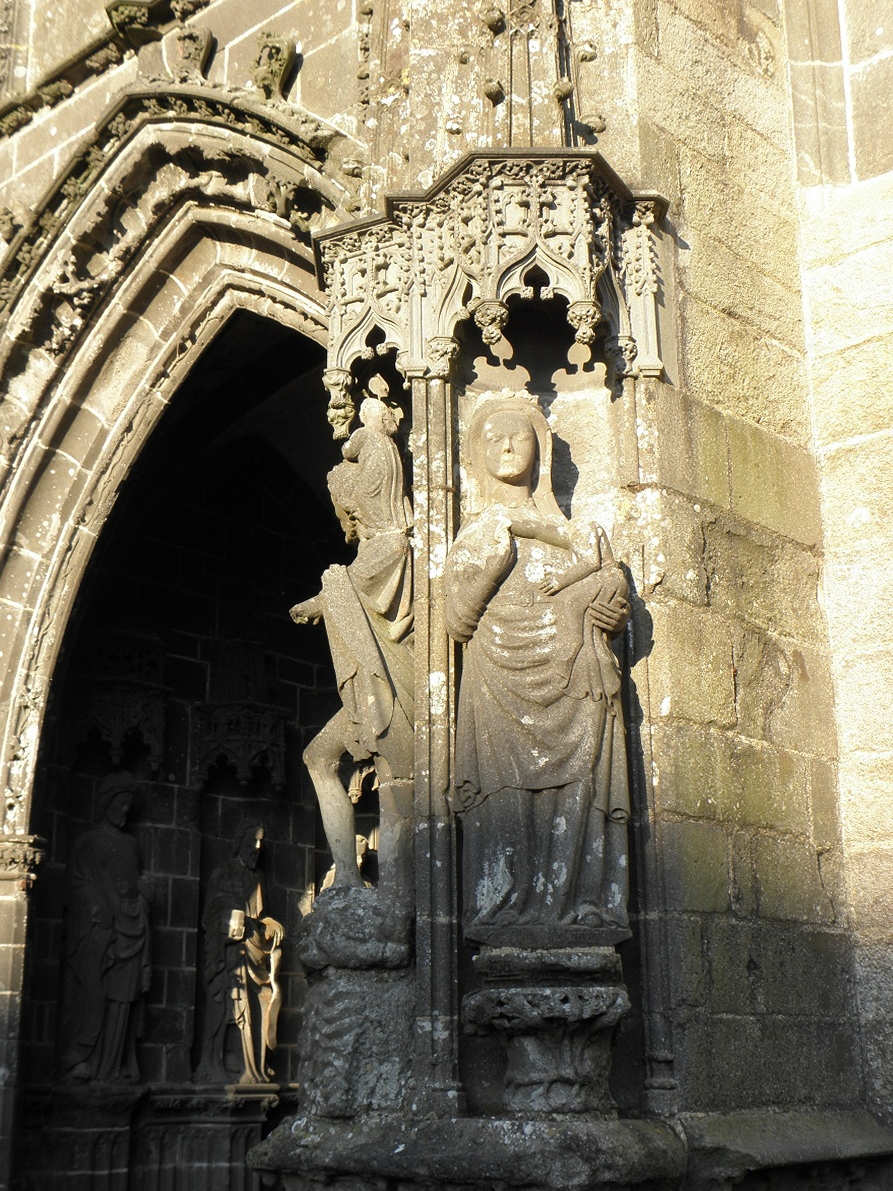
Statues of the Virgin Mary and Saint Christopher by the "porche des Apôtres"

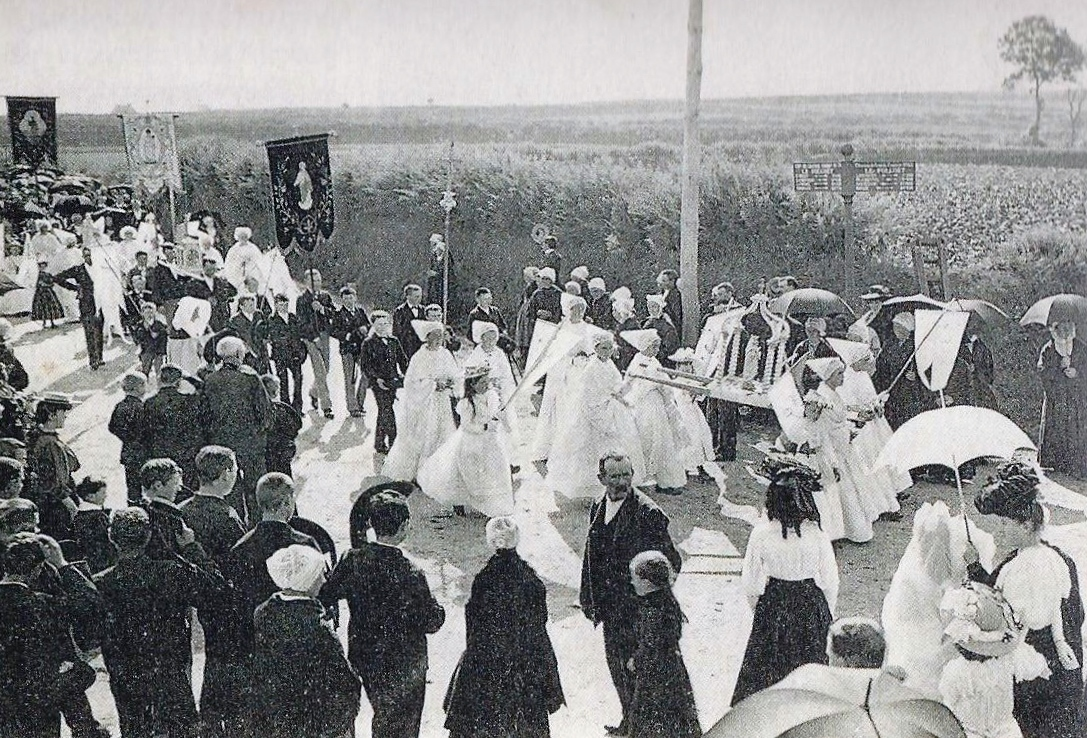
Photograph circa 1930 depicting a procession at Le Folgoët's "Pardon"

== Decoration of porches and portals-mainly using granite ==
Decoration of the church porch and portal was one of the main areas of activity for the Folgoēt atelier, which will be referred to in the rest of this article as the "atelier", and there are at least nine porches attributed to them. They specialized mainly in adding carvings of angels, saints and prophets to the niches of the voussures of porch arches, working in either granite or Kersantite, Those six porches built predominately using granite can be seen at Quimper cathedral, at Saint-Pol-de-Léon in the Kreisker chapel, in what is left of the ancient chapel of Notre-Dame des Portes at Châteauneuf-du-Faou, at Kernascléden, Saint-Fiacre du Faouët and Quimperlė

== Quimper's Cathédrale Saint-Corentin ==
Type of sculpture	Location	Description|Notes
Cathedral decoration	Quimper	Construction of the west façade of Quimper Cathedral commenced in 1424. The atelier worked on the west porch, carving decorations for both piédroits and voussures (voussoir) as well as various coats of arms. The west porch seen today is not as it was originally, having been badly damaged in the upheavals of 1793. The entrance has two doors and between them on the trumeau is a statue depicting the resurrected Christ giving a blessing and holding a globe but this dates to 1866 and replaced the atelier's granite equestrian statue of John V, Duke of Brittany (the remains of this can be seen in Quimper's Musėe dėpartemental Breton). There are seven rows of voussures in all and the three principal voussures (wedge shaped bricks or blocks at the top of the arch) are decorated with angels in niches and the other voussures are decorated with carvings of curly leaved kale. Decoration above these voussures includes an angel holding the coat of arms of Bertrand de Rosmadec. The niches of the piédroits (the lower bricks or blocks of the arch) are empty. Above the arch is a carving of the Lion of Montfort and the blazons of John V and other subsequent rulers of Brittany, Francis 1 (Duke of Brittany from 1442 to 1450) and Peter 11 (Duke of Brittany from 1450 to 1457). There is also a Lozenge (heraldry) of Joan of France, Duchess of Brittany. In the gable are the coats of arms of the Barons of Nėvet and the Lords of Bodigneau and Clohars-Fouesnant. Other blazons and escutcheons represent the Lords ("seigneurs") of Quėlenec and Faou. The atelier also worked on the south porch known as the Sainte-Catherine or Notre-Dame porch. Decoration includes angels in the voussures and a tympanum above the arch of the porch entrance with a statue depicting the Virgin Mary with child and a statue of Catherine of Alexandria located in a niche in the porch's left buttress. The arch's voussures contain eight angels in all who carry phylacteries or play musical instruments. The child held by the Virgin Mary holds a bird in his hands and she presses a book against her breast. The voussures of the south porch with the depictions of eight angels carrying either phylacteries or playing musical instruments. Above the entrance is the statue of the Virgin Mary with child The atelier also added escutcheons ("écusson") of the Nėvets and Guengats to the north porch known as the "Porche des baptémes" because it was the nearest entrance to the baptismal font and decoration to the porch's arch but the porch has no sculptures although on the interior side of the entrance door to the church there is a tympanum with a relief carving depicting the baptism of Christ. Most of the work by the atelier in Quimper was in granite.

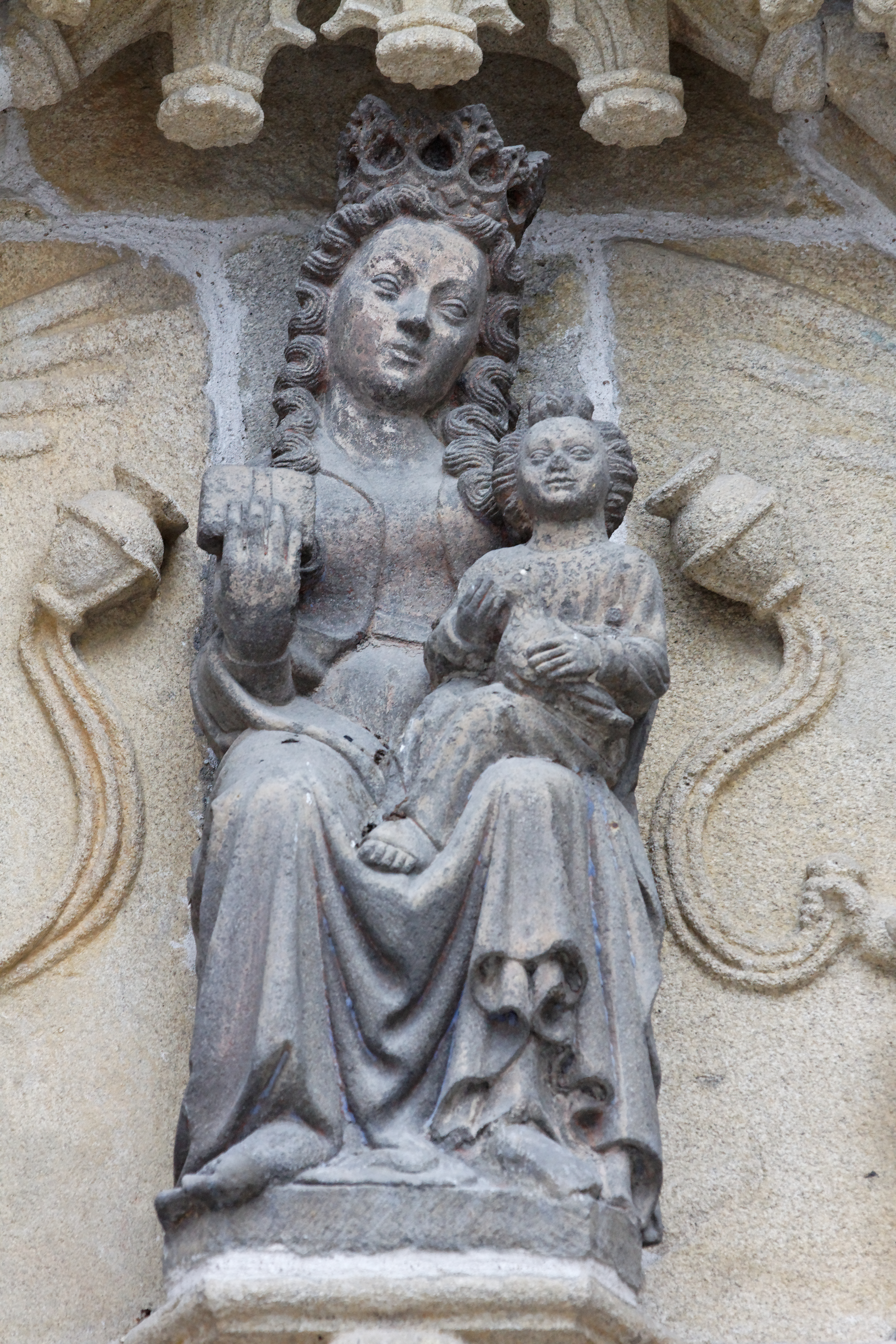
The south porch known as the Notre-Dame porch has this statue of the Virgin Mary with child in the tympanum. She has angels on either side paying homage, with other angels playing musical instruments and holding phylacteries in the arch's voussures.

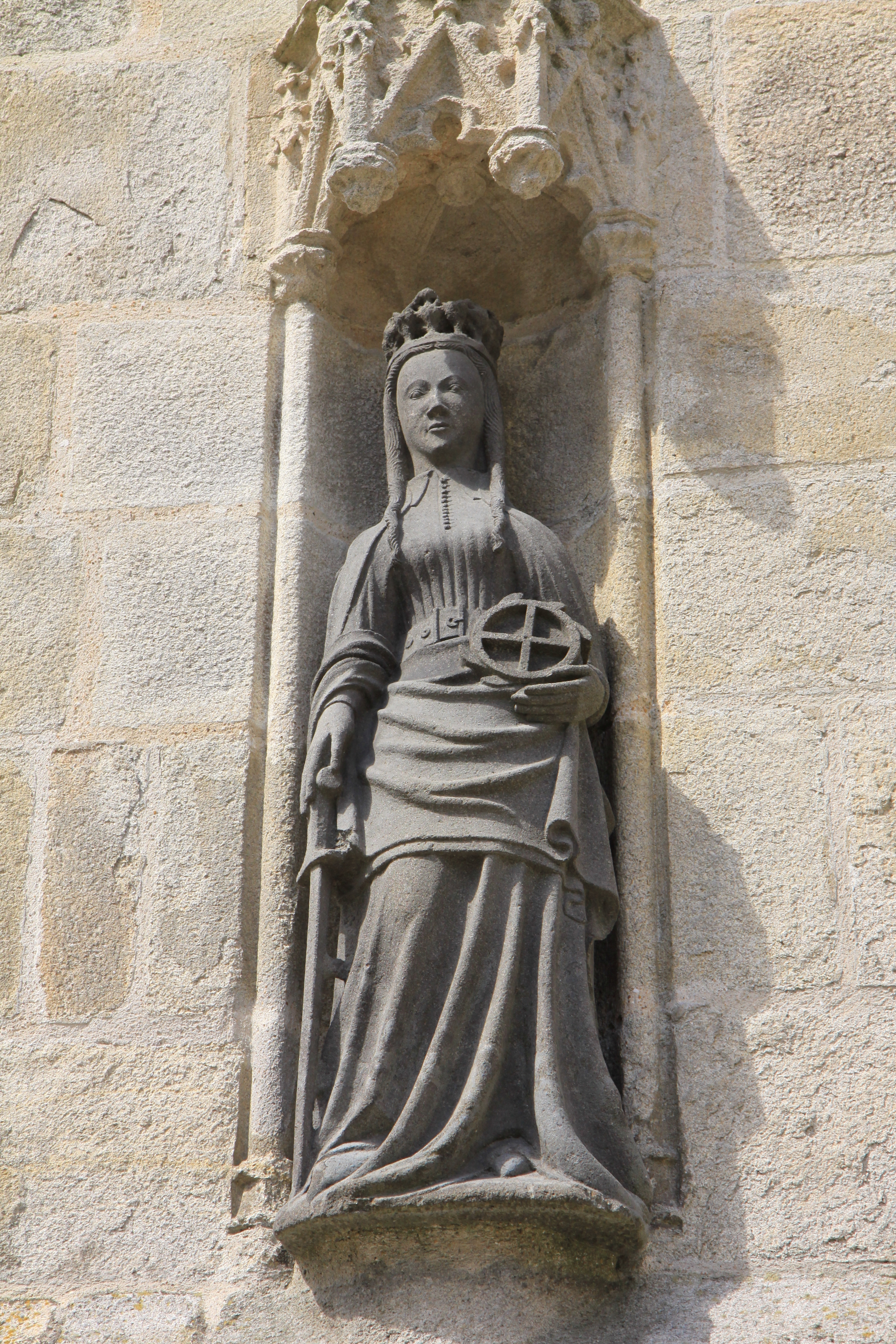
The south porch has this statue of Saint Catherine of Alexandria in a niche in the south buttress. She holds a wheel and a sword. It was on a wheel that she was martyred.

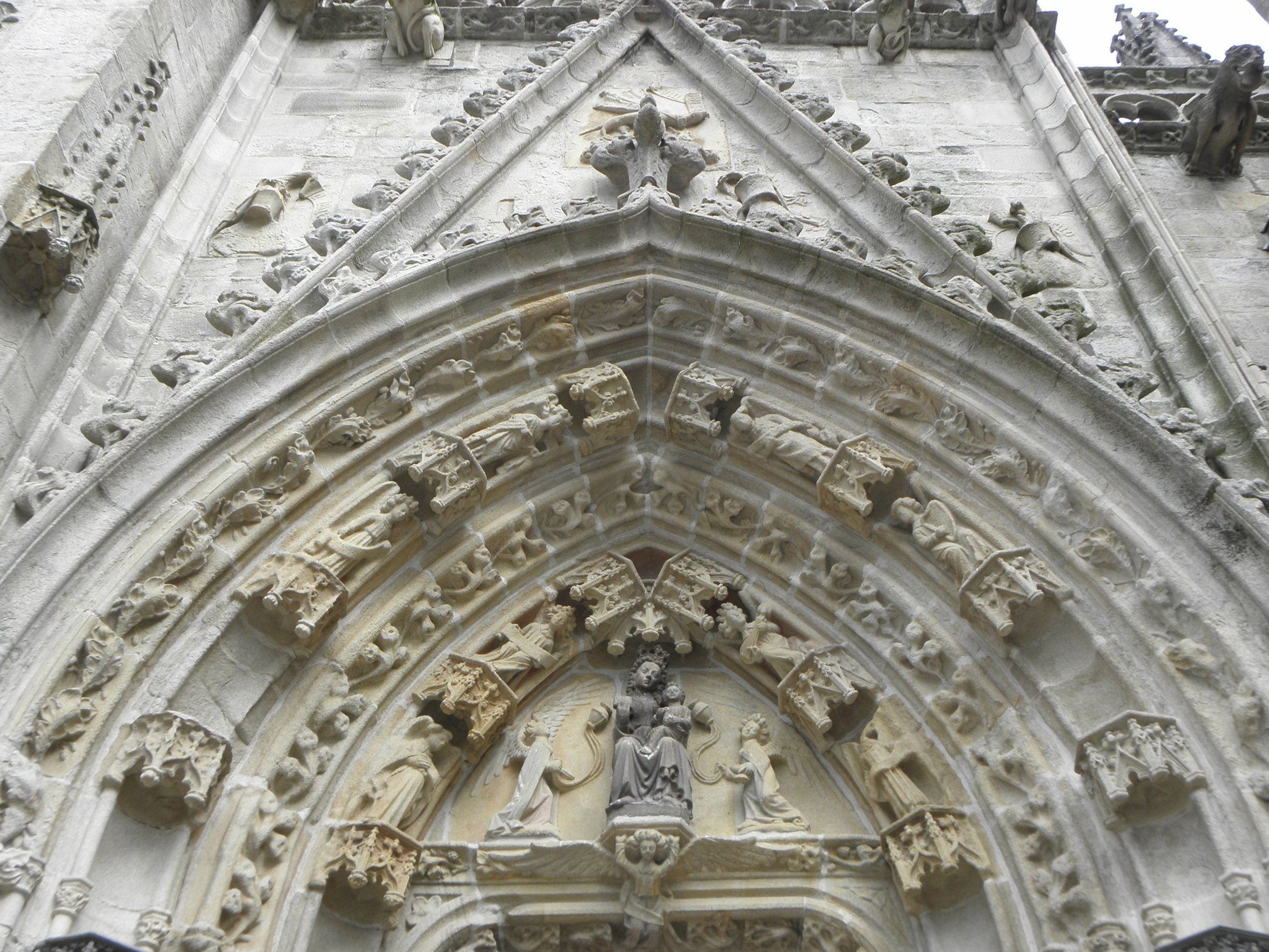
The south porch with its elaborate series of voussures.

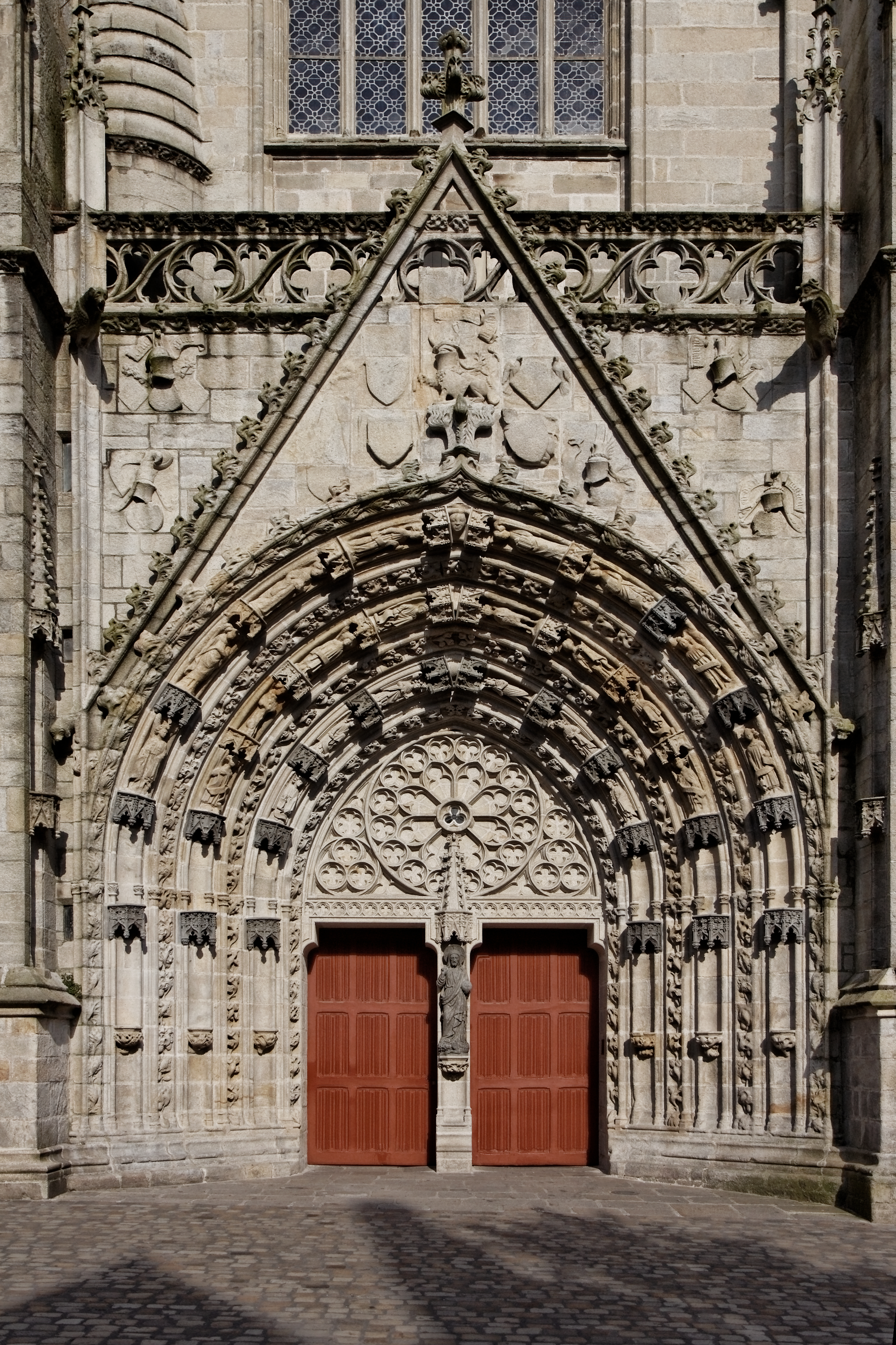
The west porch

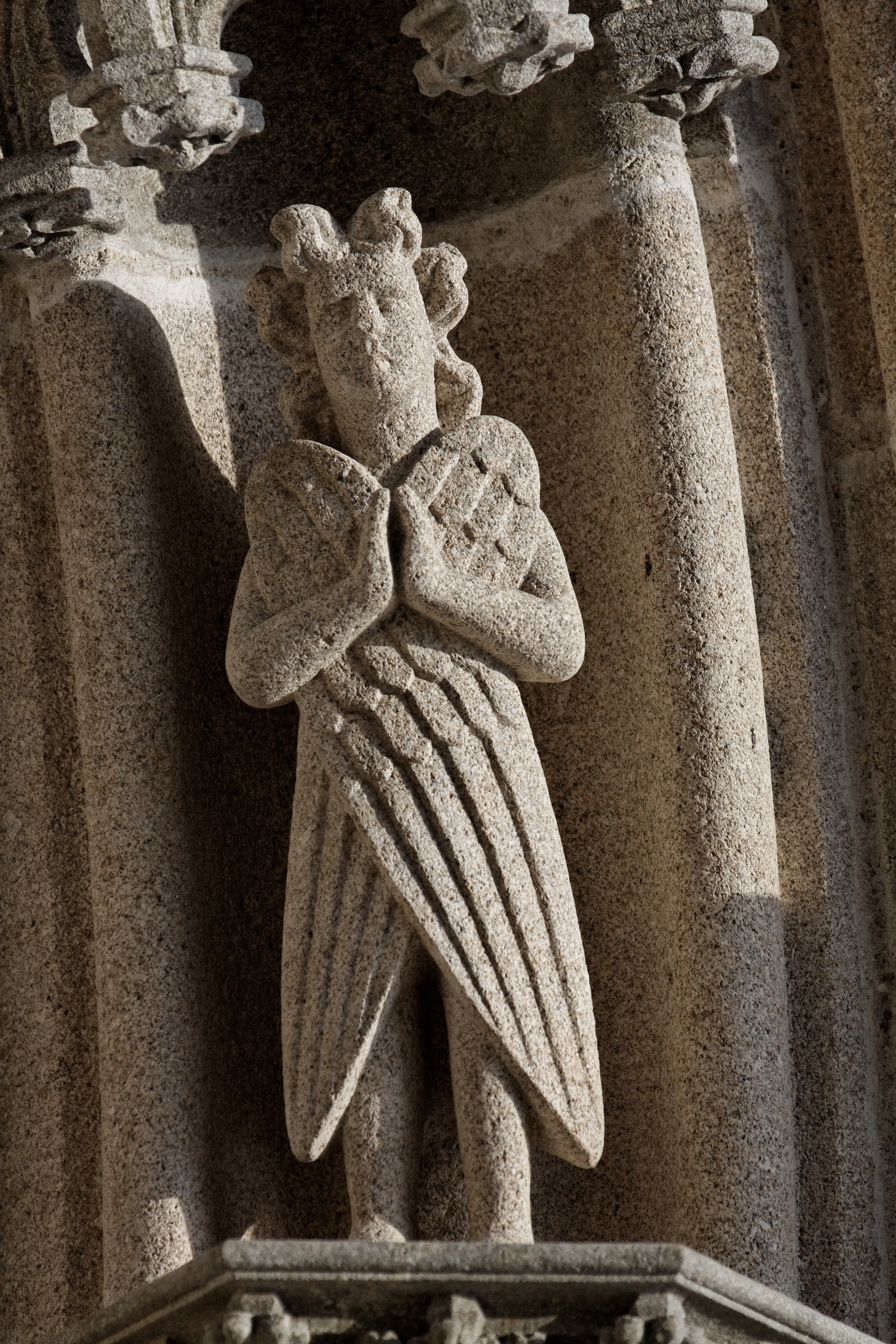
One of the angels in the west porch voussures

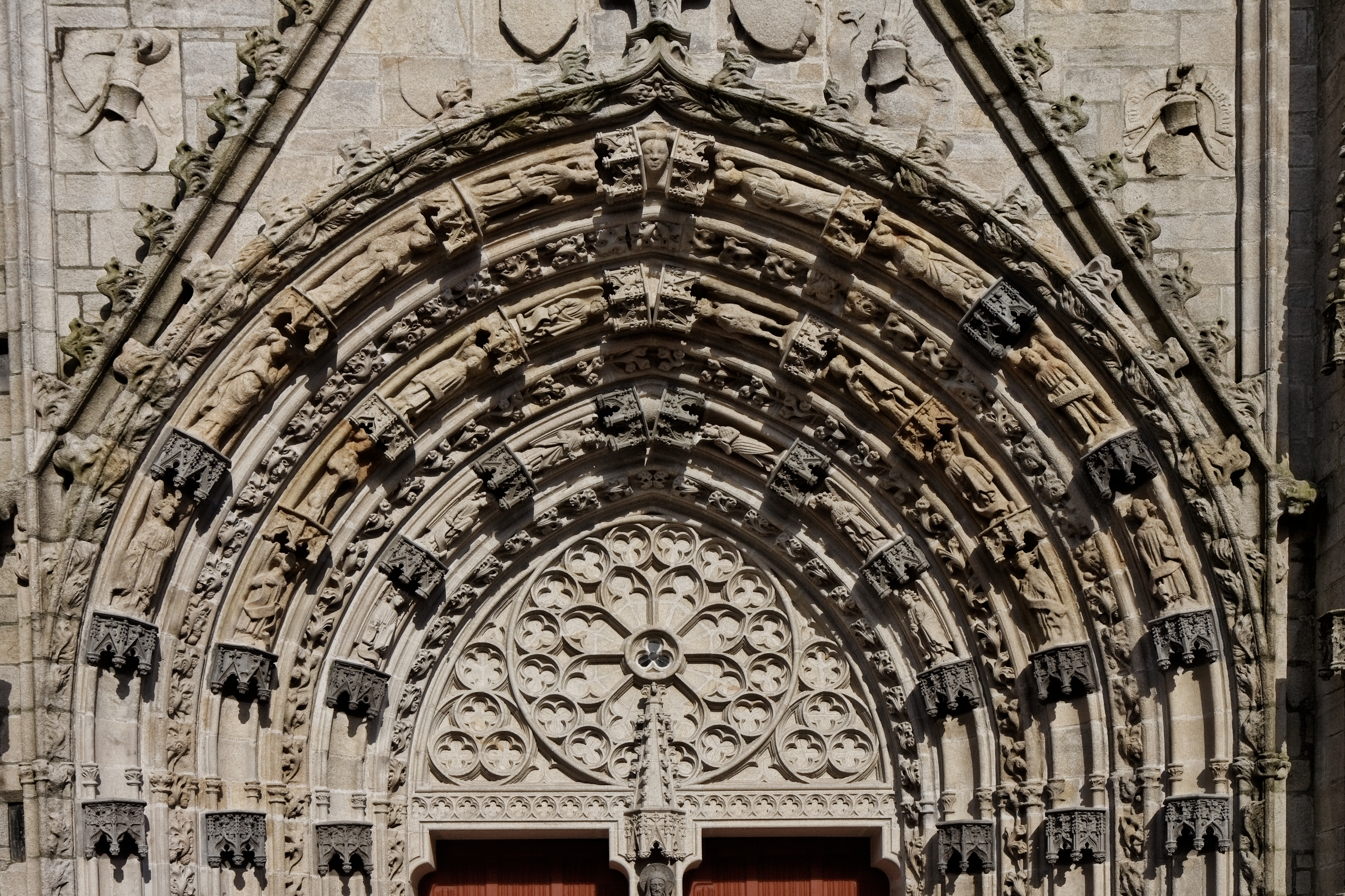
Another view of the west porch.

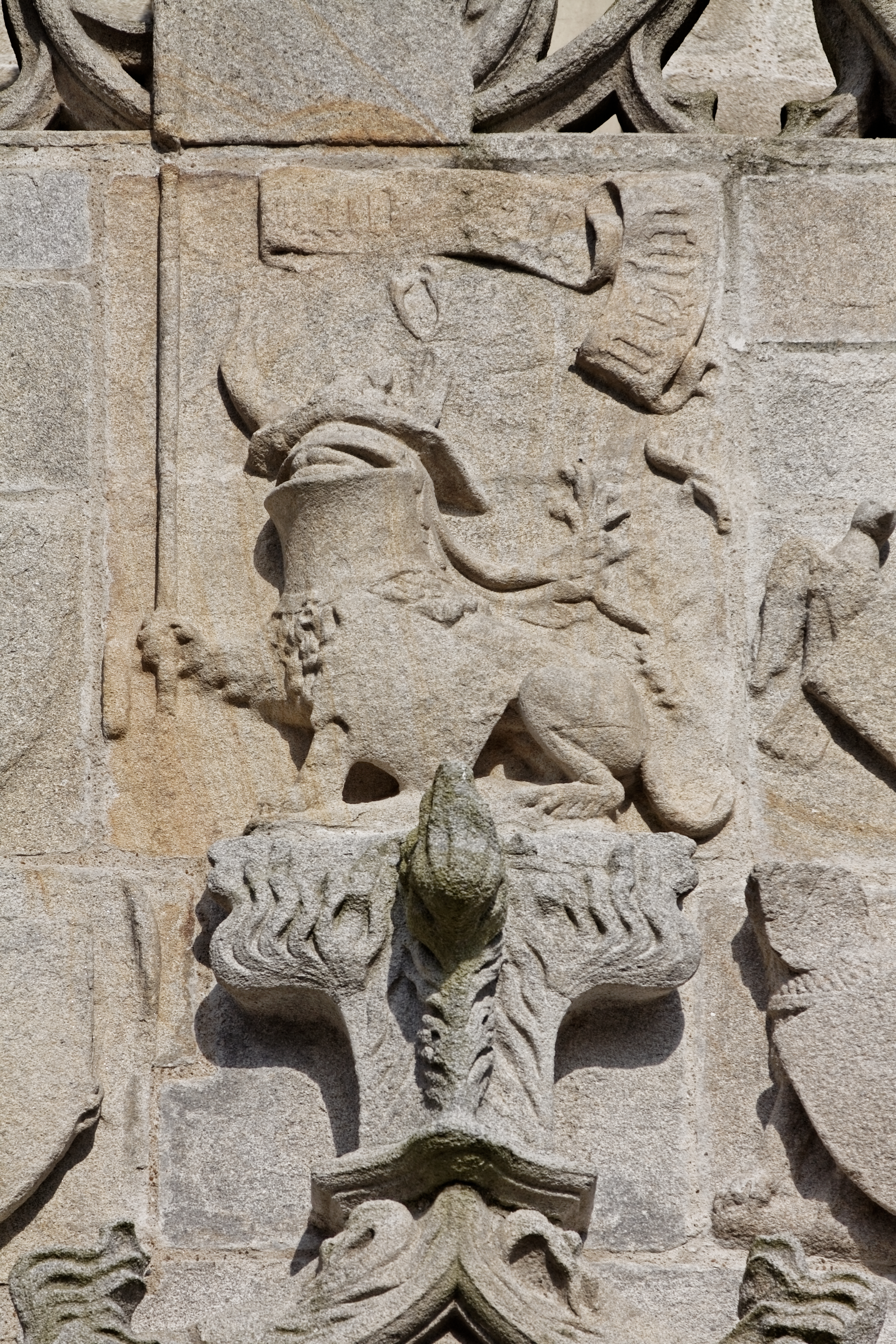
The Lion of Montfort on the west porch.

== The north porch of the Kreisker chapel ==
Type of sculpture	Location	Description|Notes
Carvings in the chapel porch	The north porch of the Kreisker chapel in Saint-Pol-de-Leon	The north porch's decoration is thought to be by the atelier and the arch's voussures contain carvings depicting saints in canopied niches. All hold a phylactery. Construction of this porch is calculated to have occurred between 1436 and 1472. It is carved from granite. North porch of Kreisker chapel

== Notre-Dame des Portes ==
Type of sculpture	Location	Description|Notes
Carving in the chapel porch	The chapel of Notre-Dame des Portes at Châteauneuf-du-Faou.	For the chapel porch the atelier carved fourteen winged angels for the voussures in the porch arcade. The porch at the chapel of Notre-Dame des Portes

== Kernascléden. The Chapelle Notre-Dame ==
Type of sculpture	Location	Description|Notes
Carving in porches	Kernascléden	For the "Porche des Hommes", the atelier were responsible for all the decoration and did so in granite. Inside the porch they added a statue of Sainte Catherine of Alexandria and a statue of Anthony the Great. The granite statue of Saint Anthony is depicted with a pig at his feet. There is also a statue of Saint Sebastian. For the "Porche des Femmes" they carried out all the decoration again using granite but the statues are not attributed to the atelier. Statue of Catherine of Alexandria

== Saint-Fiacre chapel in Le Faouët, Morbihan ==
Type of sculpture	Location	Description|Notes
Carvings in south porch and the interior of the Saint-Fiacre chapel	Le Faouët, Morbihan	The atelier carried out all the work on the south porch and added sculptures to the chapel interior including an altarpiece dedicated to Saint Sebastian, a person in a suit of armour, Saint Catherine of Alexandria and Mary Magdalene. The latter three statues have lost their heads.

== Quimperlé. The Église Notre-Dame ==
Type of sculpture	Location	Description|Notes
Carvings in the north porch	Quimperlé	The porch of the Quimperlė Notre-Dame church has a buttress with a granite niched statue of John V, Duke of Brittany attributed to the atelier. He wears armour and holds sword and shield.

== Porches using mainly Kersantite ==
Type of sculpture	Location	Description|Notes
Porch decoration	Le Faou	Rumengol forms part of the commune of Le Faou and in the Église Notre-Dame, the carving on the south porch is attributed to the atelier. This includes the Adoration of the Magi depicted in the tympanum above the porch entrance, and the twelve apostles' statues in the porch interior. The relief carving in the tympanum of the Rumengol Église Notre-Dame
Porch decoration	La Martyre	The Église Saint-Salomon's south porch was built between 1450 and 1468 using kersanton stone. The atelier decorated the tympanum above the entrance to the south porch with a depiction of the Nativity, added a scene depicting the crowning of the Virgin Mary to the top of the gable finial, and decorated both the external and internal piėdroits and voussures. Decoration of the interior piėdroits and voussures included scenes depicting the Annunciation, the Visitation (Christianity) and marriage of the Virgin Mary, the Presentation of Jesus at the Temple, Jesus with the lawyers, Herod and the Massacre of the Innocents, King Salomon and a group of soldiers and Jean V and his royal guard. The interior piėdroits and voussures carry depictions including the Adoration of the Magi and the Adoration of the Shepherds. Further carvings to the exterior piėdroits and voussures include Saint Sebastian with arrow, Saint Lawrence with gridiron, Saint Fiacre and Saint Anthony. The church facade around the porch is also decorated with various angels and coats of arms. Inside the porch, the atelier added statues of the twelve apostles, a depiction of the Virgin Mary in the trumeau (architecture) between the two entrance doors to the church and above these doors the coat of arms of the Rohans and the lion of the vicomtes of Lėon. See also La Martyre Parish close. One of the many angels decorating the church façade

== Tombs/Gisant ==
Type of sculpture	Location	Description|Notes
The tomb of Jean de Kerouzėrė	Sibiril	The atelier were responsible for this tomb in the Église Saint-Pierre in around 1460. The effigy wears armour, his hands joined in prayer and has a lion at his feet. Two small angels sit at his head. The gisant/effigy rests on a sarcophagus which has various plaques placed around it. The plaques bear several carvings including the Kerouzėrė coat of arms and their motto "LIST.LIST" (Laissez,Laisser).
The tomb or gisant of Sainte Nonne	Dirinon	The tomb of Sainte Nonne (I will continue the French habit of adding an "e" to denote a female saint) dates to around 1468 and sits in the middle of the nave of the Sainte-Nonne chapel, the feet of the saint pointing to the altar (to the east). At her feet is a dragon spitting fire. Beneath the effigy/ gisant a sepulchre type structure has carved panels around it, these panels having bas-reliefs depicting either individual apostles or coats of arms. One depicts Saint Peter with his key, Philip the Apostle with a sword and Bartholomew the Apostle with a knife. Another depicts an angel bearing the blazon of Simon de Kerbringal. Another panel depicts an unidentified saint pointing to James the Greater who carries a fuller's baton and another depicts Andrew the Apostle with a saltaire cross, James the Greater in pilgrim's garb and John the Baptist. The central panel depicts a bishop possibly Saint Divy and the coat of arms of Guy de Maufuric of Lezuzan, the abbot of Daoulas who died in 1468. The coat of arms is held by an angel. The next panel depicts two unidentified saints and John the Evangelist The panel at the feet of Sante Nonne carries the coat of arms of Simon de Kerbringal. See also. Dirinon Parish close
Tomb and effigies	Le Faouët, Morbihan	In Le Faouët's Église Notre-Dame de l'Assomption are two gisants or effigies which are attributed to the atelier. Both are in granite and can be found laid against the wall in the south transept. These effigies of Perronville de Boutteville and Bertrand de Trogoff were removed from the actual tomb which can be seen outside the church. On it are carved the coats of arms of the Bouttevilles. The gisant of Perronville de Boutteville and Bertrand de Trogoff
Flagstone for gisant of Saint Ronan	Locronan	In the chapelle du Penity is a flagstone carved by the atelier for the tomb of Saint Ronan. On the flagstone is an effigy gisant of the saint. A lion is depicted at his feet bearing five coats of arms.
Tomb	Plouvien	In the south aisle of the Saint-Jaoua chapel there is the tomb of Saint Jaoua. This is attributed to the atelier who added the sculpture of a dog by the saint's feet. The upper part of the tomb of Saint Jaoua

== Calvaries ==
Type of sculpture	Location	Description|Notes
Calvary	Le Folgoët	On this calvary, the atelier are attributed with the statue of Alain de Coëtivy who donated the calvary and Saint Alain who is depicted in the attire of a bishop.
Calvary	Le Faou	The calvary of the Église du Rumengol has work attributed to the atelier, namely a depiction of the Virgin Mary and John the Evangelist on either side of the crucifixion, a statue depicting the Virgin Mary with child and an angel crowning the child, the good and bad robbers and a coat of arms.
Calvary	Plomodiern	The atelier are credited with the statues on this calvary. On the front of the calvary there are sculptures of the Virgin Mary and John the Evangelist on either side of the crucifixion with a pietà beneath Christ's feet and on the reverse side a depiction of "Christ at the last judgement" (Christ du Jugement dernier).
Calvary	Quemeneven	The calvary of the Kergoat chapel includes a statue of Saint Guėnolė on the altar table on the west face of the calvary. This is attributed to the atelier.

== Gallery of images ==
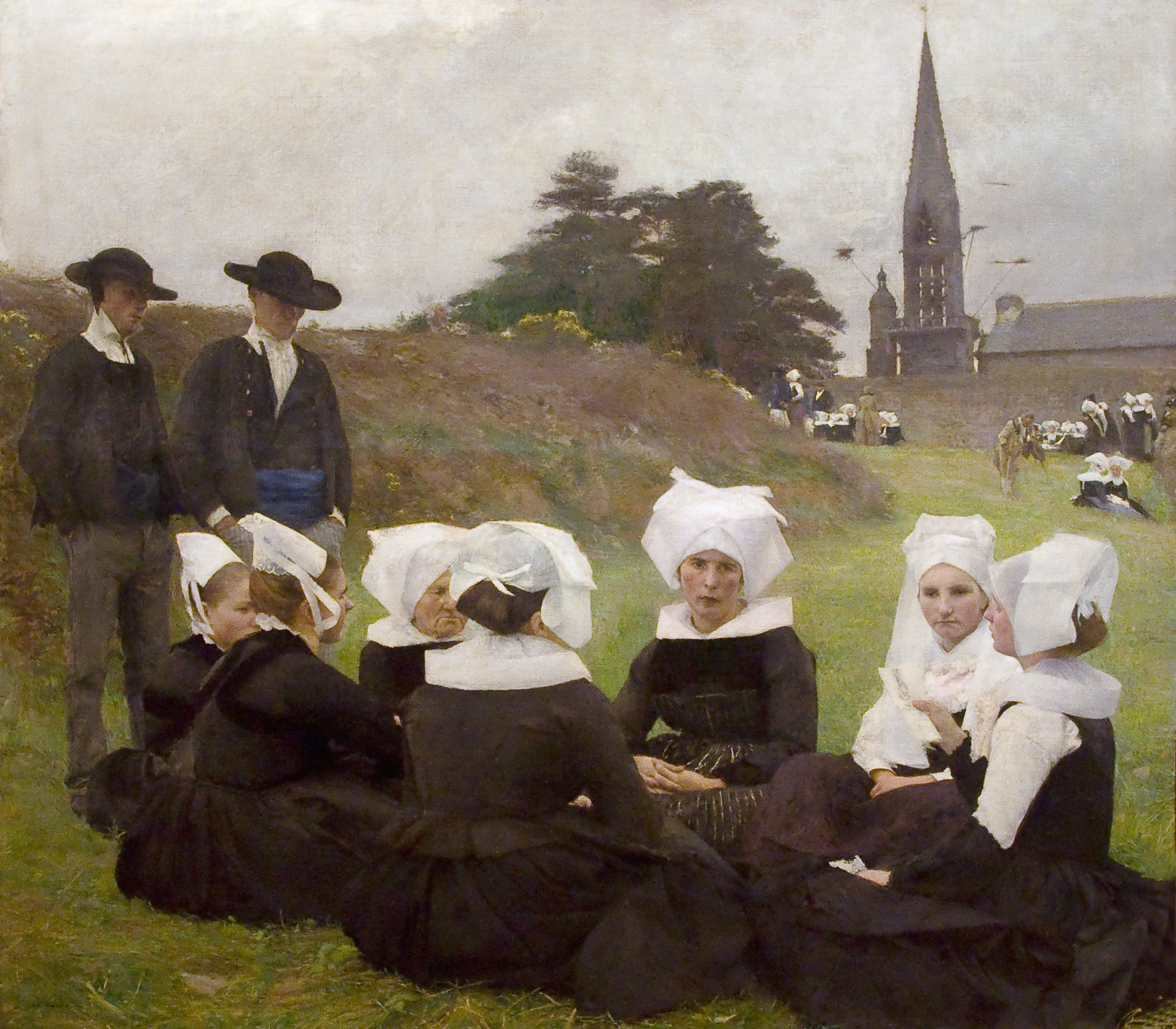
A painting by Pascal Dagnan-Bouveret (1852-1929) entitled "Les Bretonnes au pardon" which relates to the Rumengol pardon.

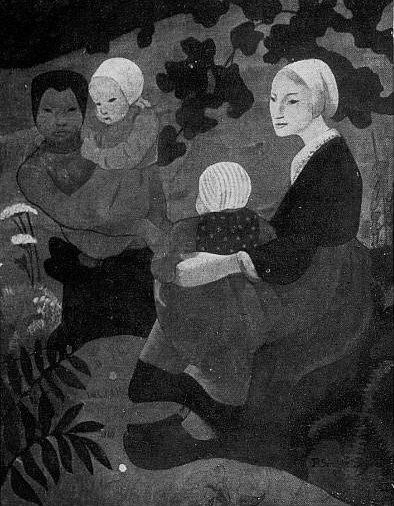
Paul Sérusier's painting "Jeunes Bretonnes"

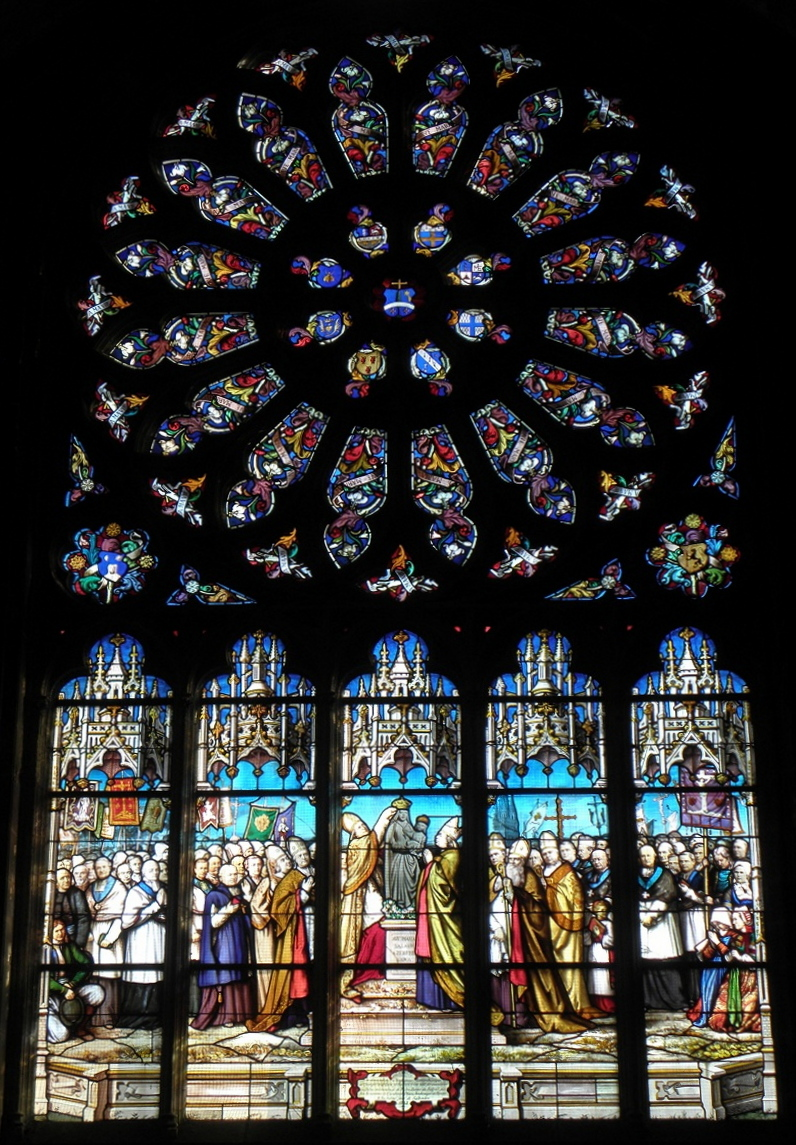
The stained glass window depicting the "coronation" in the Basilique Le Folgoët

== Miscellaneous ==
Type of sculpture	Location	Description
Tympanum	Plouvien	The atelier carved a depiction of Christ's baptism for the tympanum over the west door of the Saint-Jean-Balanant chapel. The baptism of Christ
Statues	Daoulas	In the gardens of the Musėe de l'Abbaye are three statues attributed to the atelier. One depicting Saint Sebastian is located near the stairway leading to the garden containing medicinal plants, another of a monk near the abbey entrance and a third of Andrew the Apostle is located on the outside of the cloisters. Also in Daoulas' Èglise Notre-Dame there is a statue of John the Baptist.
Statue of the Virgin Mary	Rennes	This statue is in Rennes' Musėe de Bretagne and came from the Église Notre-Dame de Lesneven.
Statue of James the Greater	Tréméven, Finistère	This work by the atelier is located in a niche in a fountain near the chapel Saint-Jacques.
Remains of a statue	Landerneau	In Landerneau's Place Poul ar Stang there are the remains of a statue inserted in the wall.
Statue by museum	Le Folgoët	The atelier are credited with a statue of the Virgin Mary with child which stands on the lawn by the Le Folgoët museum. It is carved from kersanite.
Statue in museum	Morlaix	In Morlaix' Musée there is a statue of James the Greater which came from the Saint-Roch chapel in the old chateau of Creac'h.
Porch architecture and furnishings in chapel	Le Faouët, Morbihan	In the Saint-Fiacre chapel the atelier were responsible for all the sculpture in the south porch and in the chapel interior they are attributed with the three statues comprising Saint Sebastian and two archers in a rectangular niche, the statue of a man in armour, Saint Catherine of Alexandria and a statue of Mary Magdalene. The latter statues have lost their heads and the Saint Sebastian group is not intact.
Annunciation group	La Ferrière, Côtes-d'Armor	In the Notre-Dame Église are sculptures by the atelier depicting the Virgin and the Angel of the Annunciation. They date to between 1423 and 1468 and stand in the church's north transept. The angel carries a phylactery inscribed "AVE MARIA".
Statue of Saint Barbe	Plogonnec	The atelier are attributed with the statue of Sainte Barbe positioned in a niche in the porch of the Église Saint-Thurien. The work is dated to between 1423 and 1433.
Statue of Virgin Mary	Plougoulm	In Plougoulm's Église Saint-Colomban there is a statue of the Virgin Mary breastfeeding the baby Jesus which is attributed to the atelier and dates to between 1423 and 1433. The Virgin Mary with baby Jesus at her breast

== The second Folgoēt atelier or workshop ==
The works attributed to the second Folgoēt atelier are-

== The porch at Plourac'h ==
In the Église Saint-Jean-Baptiste the second Folgoēt atelier are attributed with work on the south porch and in particular with the apostles in the porch interior.

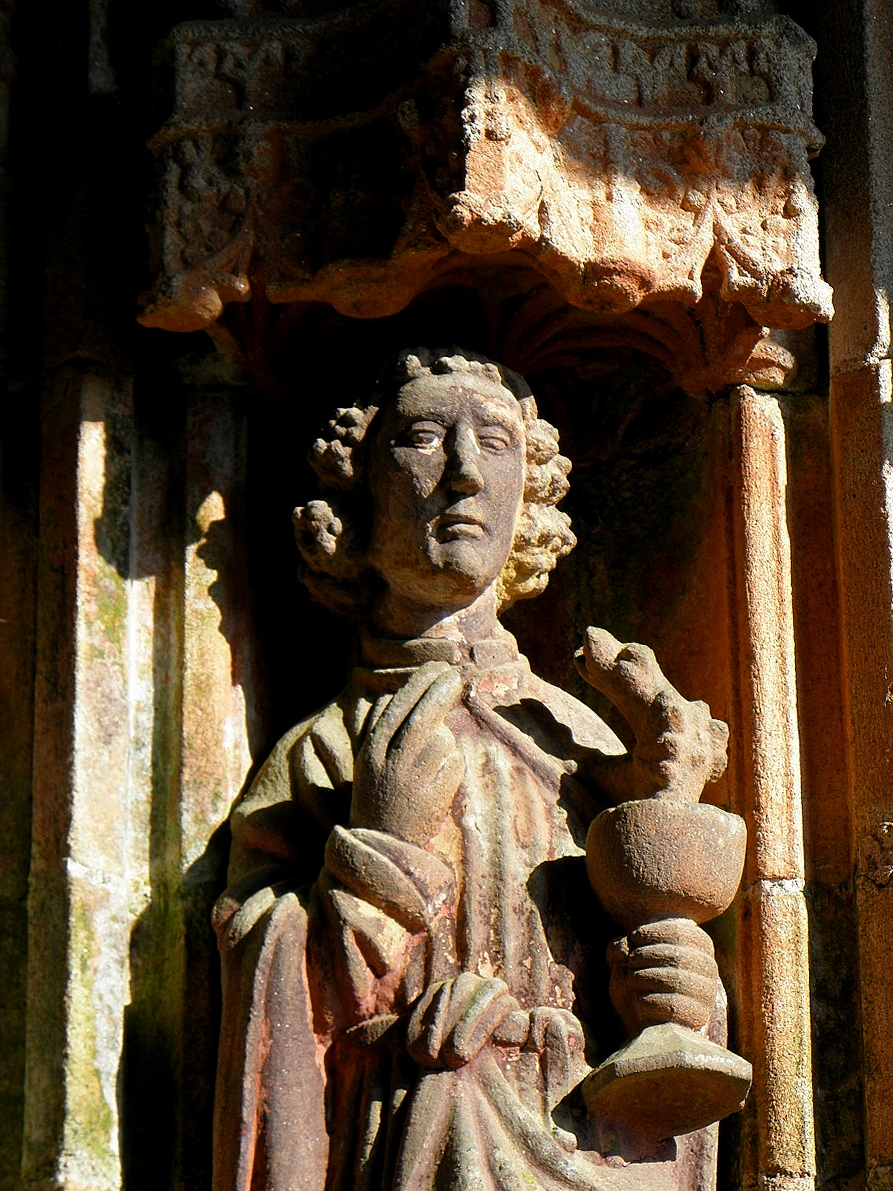
One of the apostles in the Église Saint-Jean-Baptiste's south porch

== The porch of Saint-Herbot ==
The Église Saint-Herbot in Plonévez-du-Faou has many works attributed to the second atelier. All of the south porch is by the atelier including external and internal voussures, a statue of Saint-Herbot on the trumeau of the double doored entrance to the church at the end of the porch and the statues of the apostles in the porch interior.

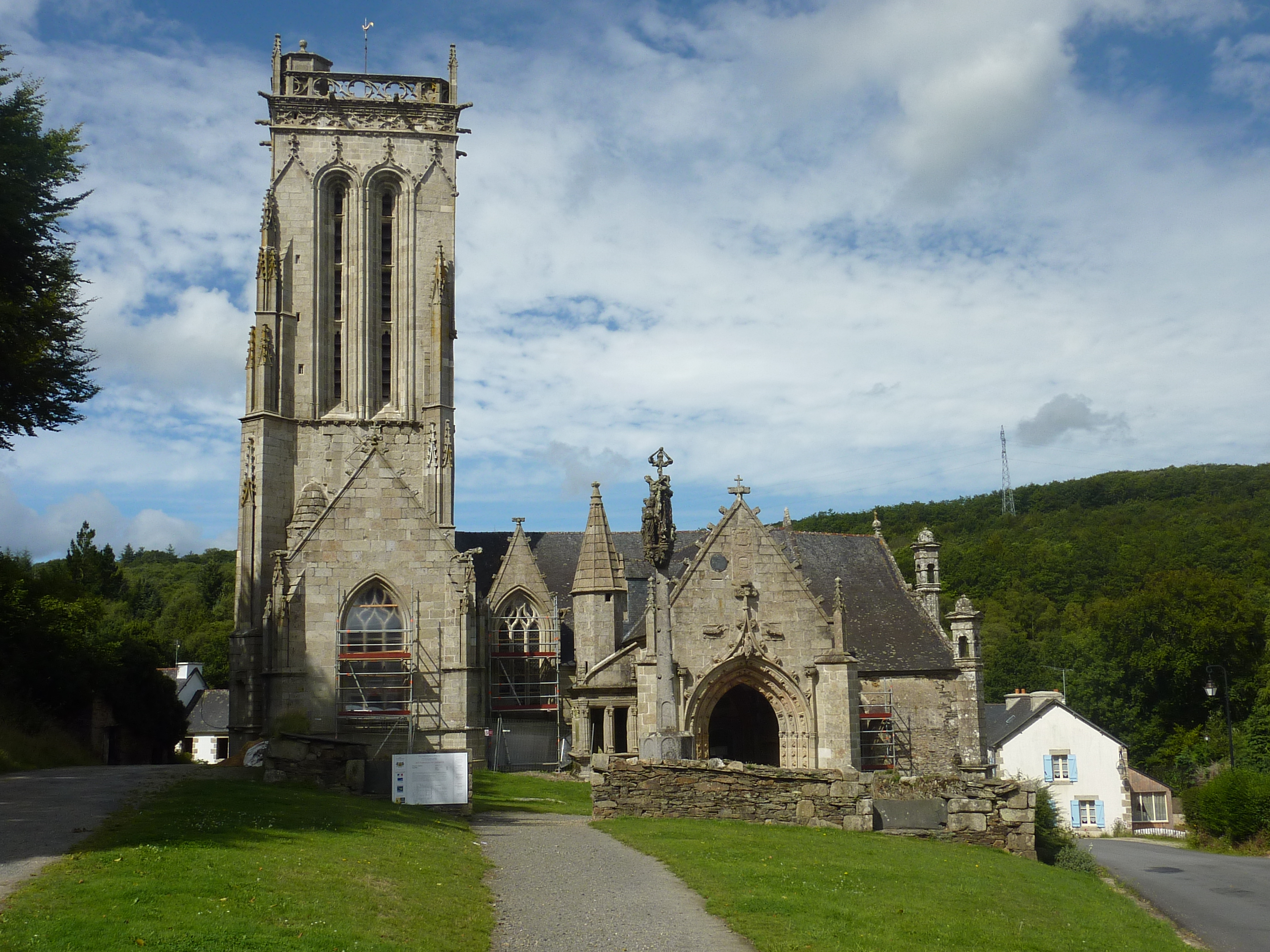
Église Saint-Herbot

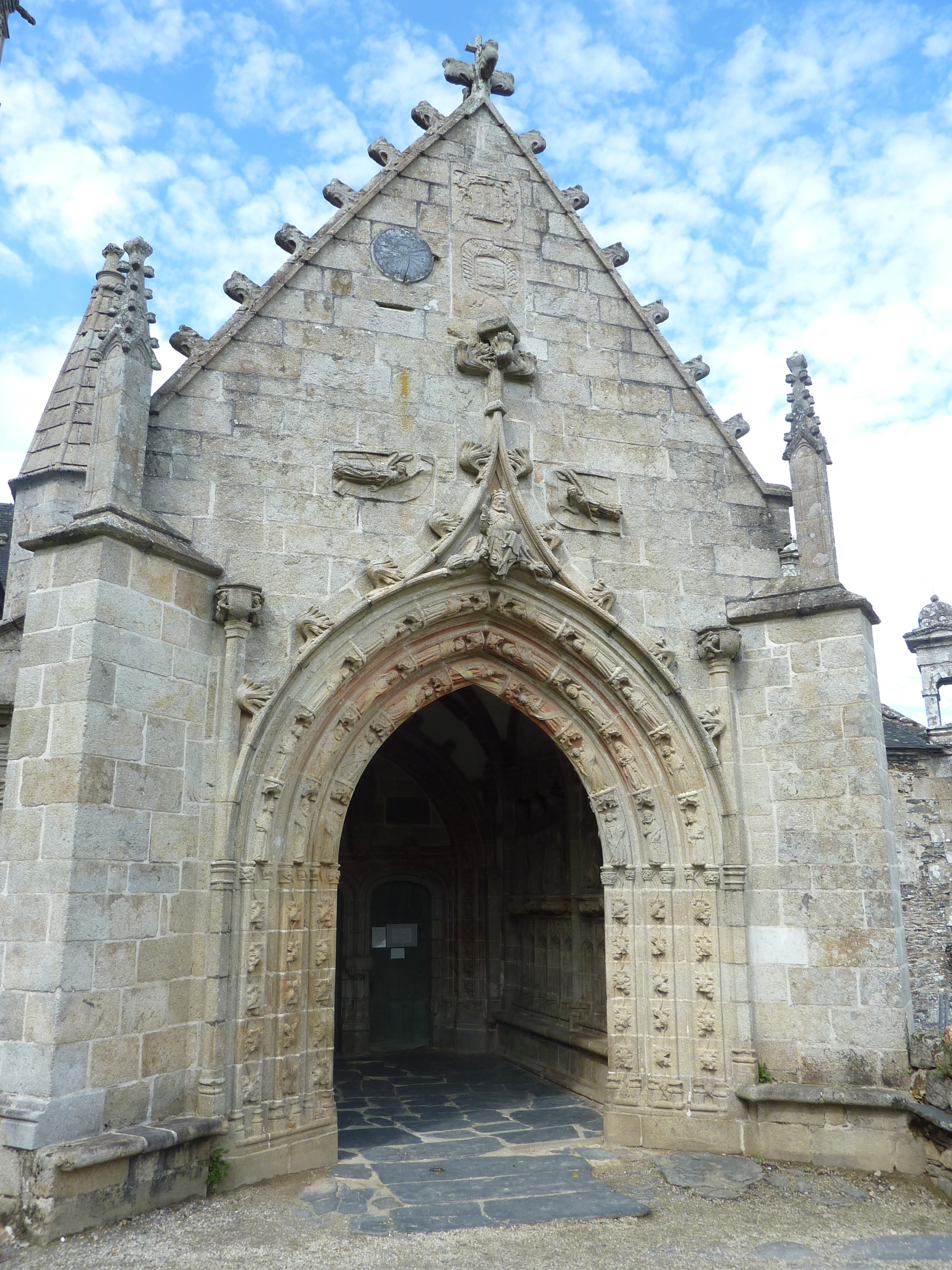
The south porch of the Église Saint-Herbot

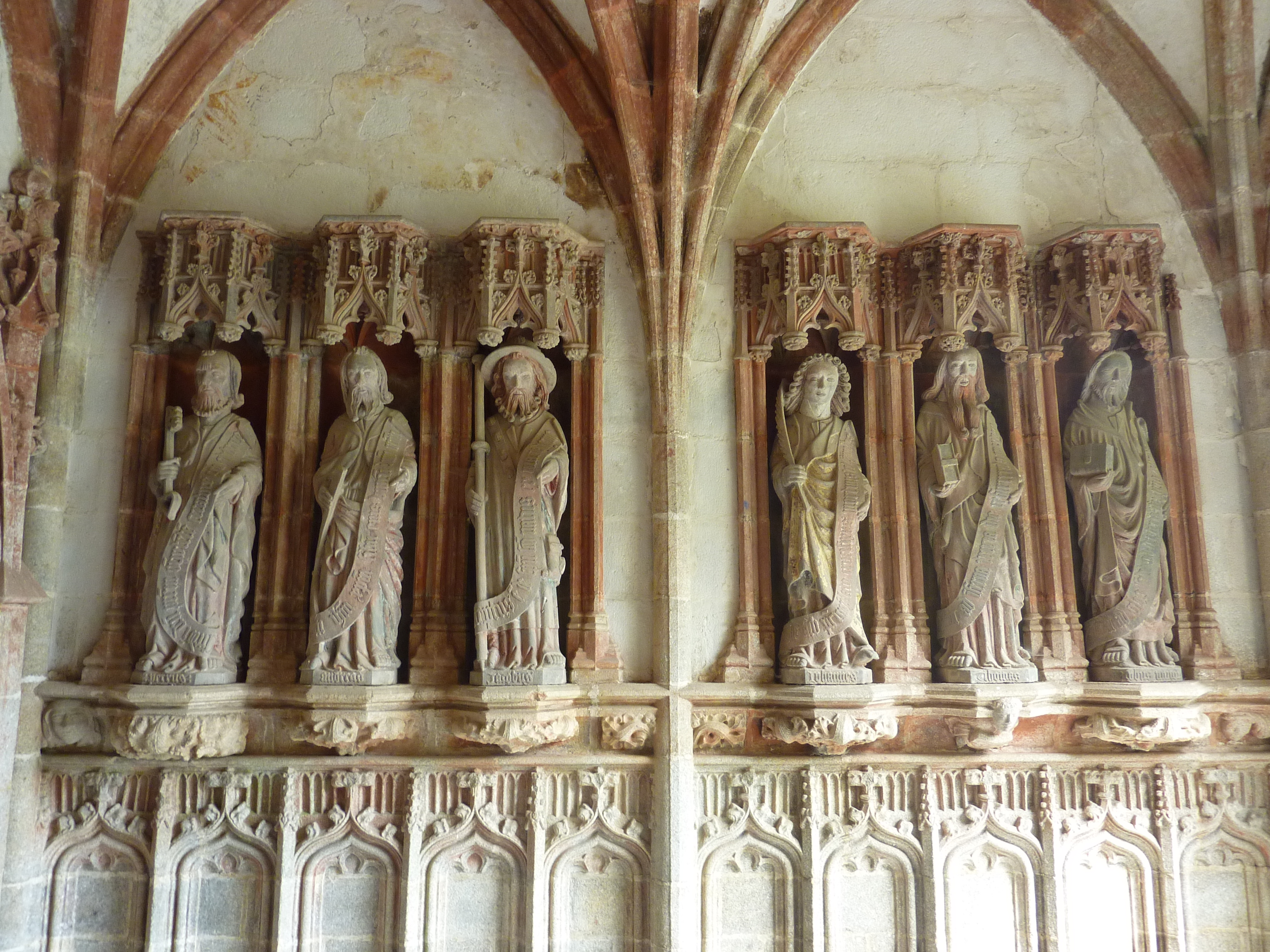
Statues in south porch of the Église Saint-Herbot

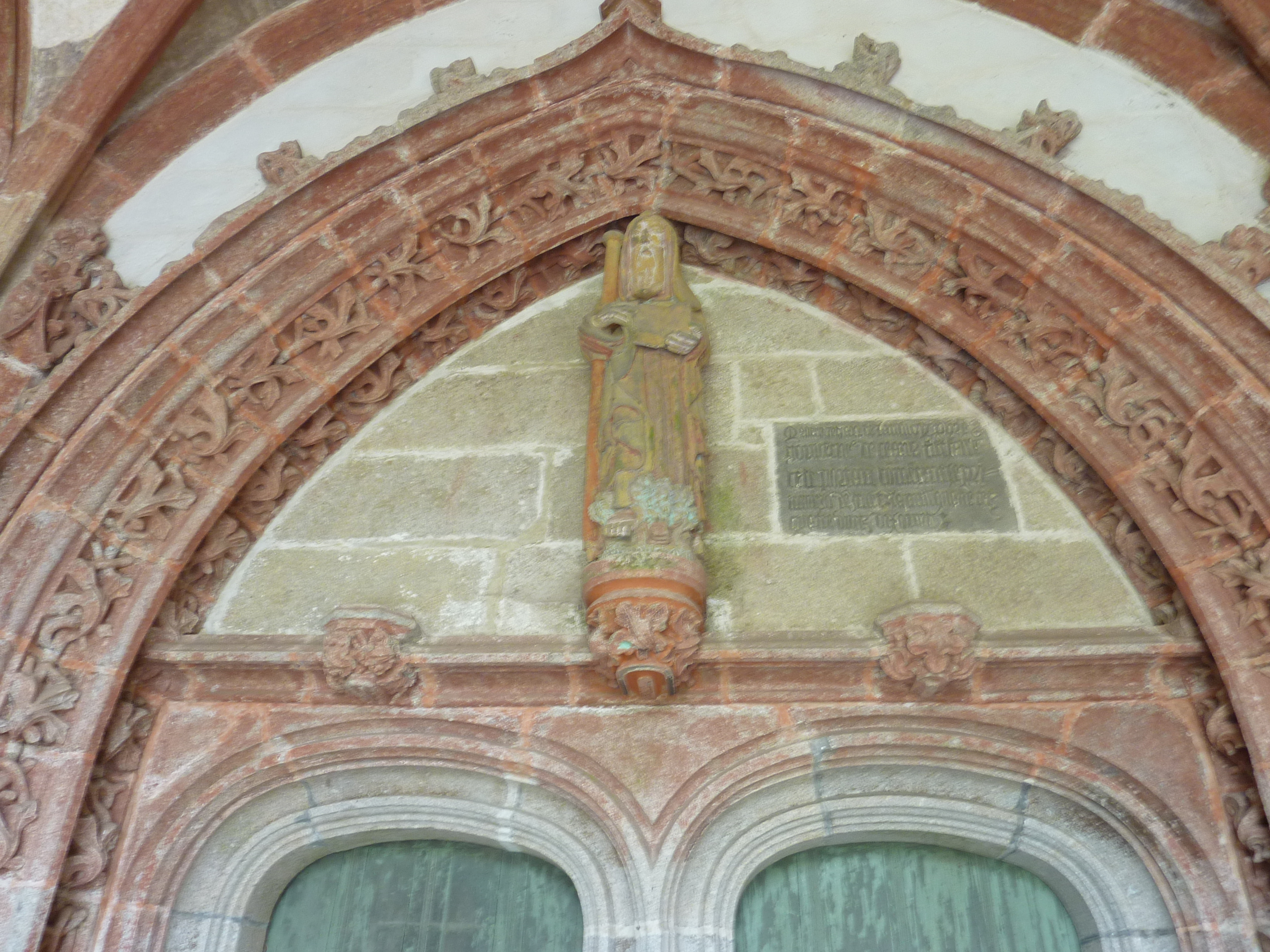
The entrance doors to the church in the south porch of Église Saint-Herbot
