= Kernascléden =

Commune in Brittany, France

Kernascléden Kernaskledenn
- Commune
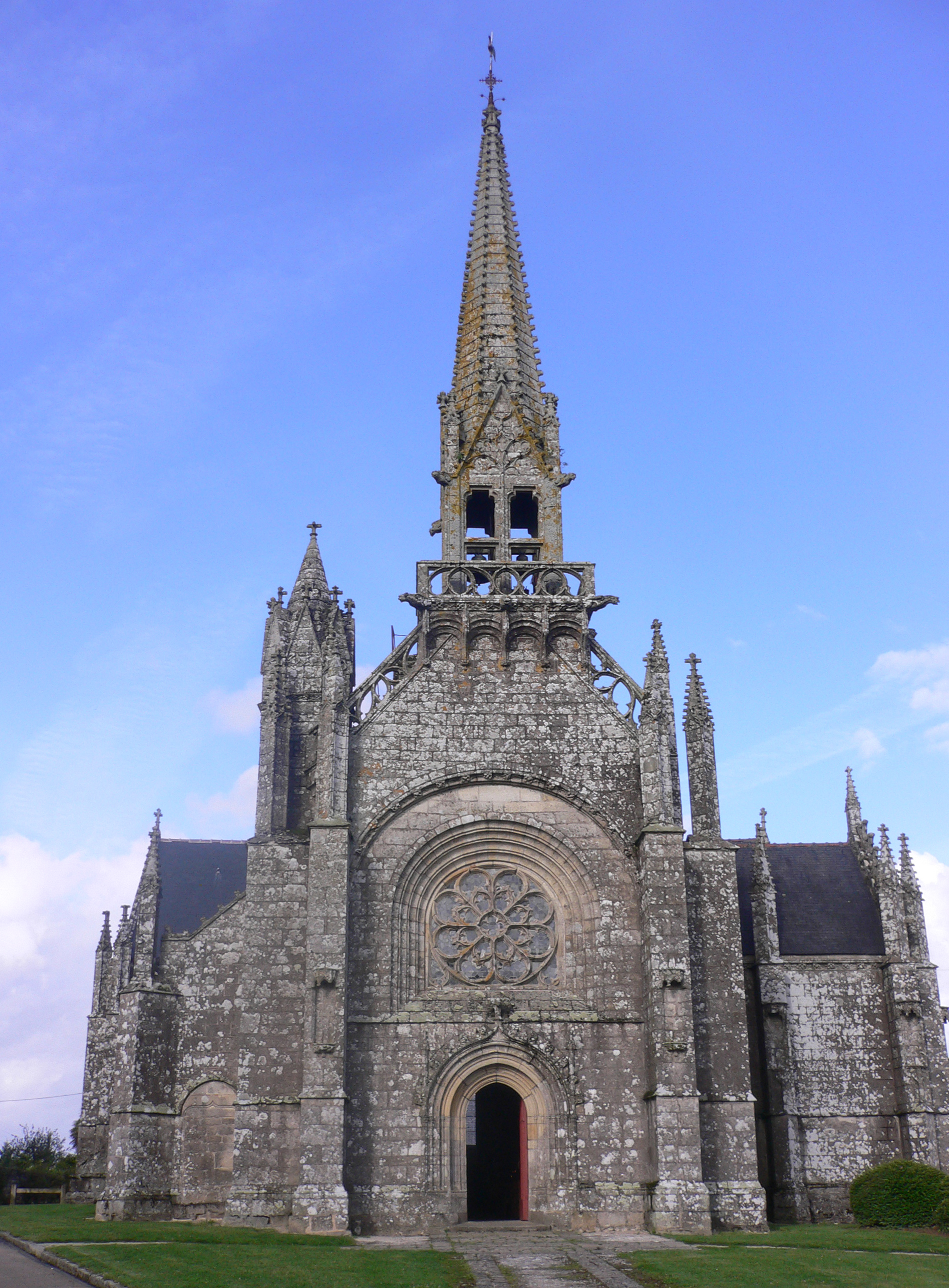
- The Church of Our Lady, in Kernascléden

- Coat of arms
- Location of Kernascléden
- Location within France Location within Brittany
- Coordinates: 48°00′25″N 3°19′11″W
- Country: France
- Region: Brittany
- Department: Morbihan
- Arrondissement: Pontivy
- Canton: Gourin
- Intercommunality: Roi Morvan Communauté

Government
  - Mayor (2026–32): Christophe Cararic
- Area^{1}: 9.26 km^{2} (3.58 sq mi)
- Highest elevation: 163 m (535 ft)
- Lowest elevation: 89 m (292 ft)
- Population (2023): 418
  - Density: 45.1/km^{2} (117/sq mi)
- Time zone: UTC+01:00 (CET)
  - Summer (DST): UTC+02:00 (CEST)
- INSEE/Postal code: 56264 /56540
- ^{1} French Land Register data, which excludes lakes, ponds, glaciers > 1 km^{2} (0.386 sq mi or 247 acres) and river estuaries.

Kernascléden (French pronunciation: [kɛʁnaskledɛn]; Breton: Kernaskledenn) is a commune in the Morbihan department of Brittany in north-western France. Kernascléden is renowned for its church which dates from he fifteenth century. It is a masterpiece of flamboyant gothic architecture.

== Geography ==
Kernascléden is located in the northern part of Morbihan department, 29 km (18 mi) north of Lorient. Historically, the village belongs to Vannetais. In the center of the village stands the medieval church Notre-Dame de Kernascléden. The village is situated in the valley of the river Scorff. Apart from the village center, there are about twenty hamlets : Brangolo, Kerchopine, Kerbourg, Manéglau, Canquisquelen, Manério, Porh Pimpec, Guernebos, La Maison Blanche, Kerven Cleuzio, Kerven er Lann, Kerihuel, Kerlouarny, Kermaria, Kermonac'h.

== Map ==
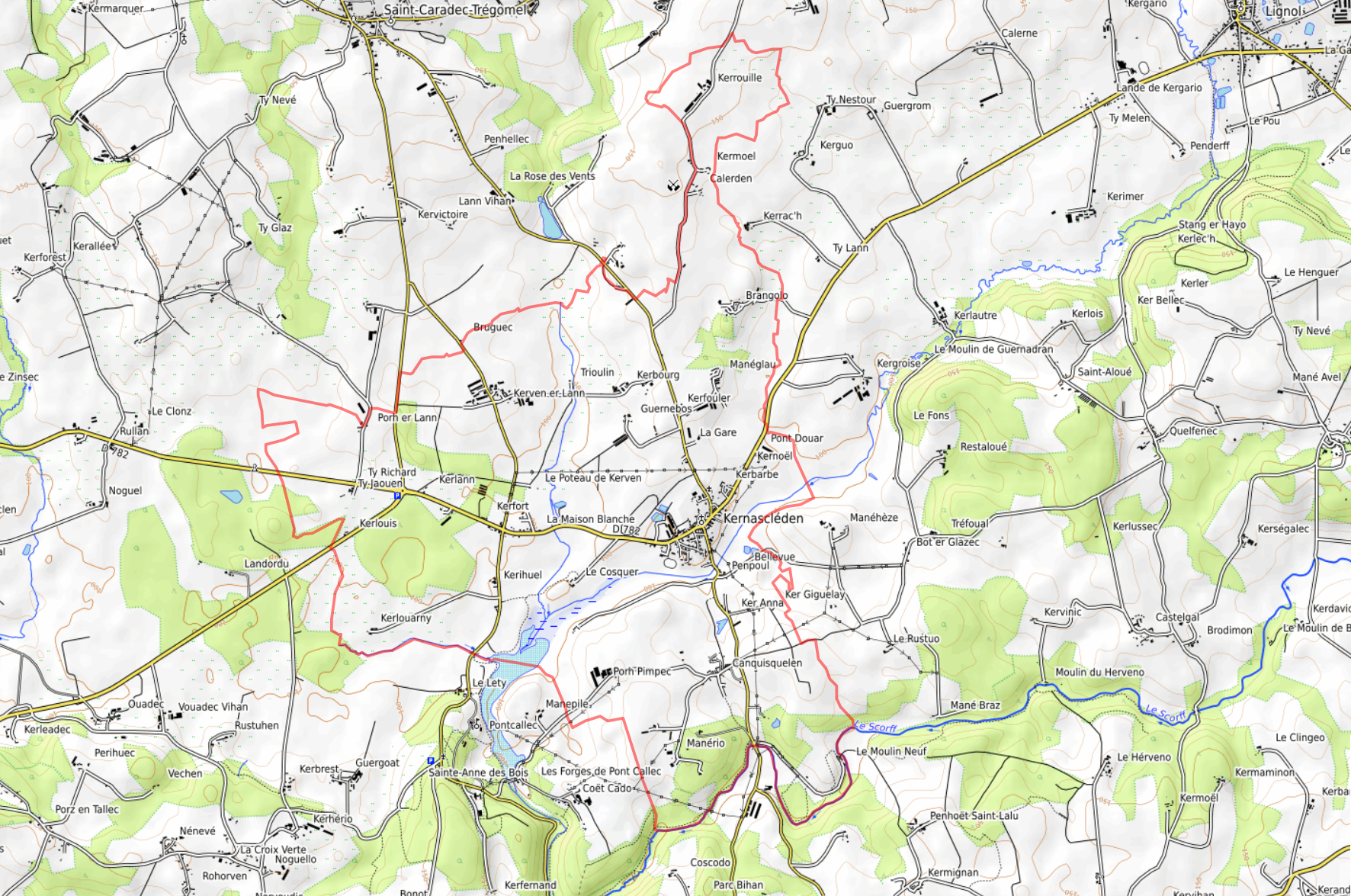
Topographic map

== History ==
Scenes of the daily life at the beginning of the twentieth century in Kernascléden.

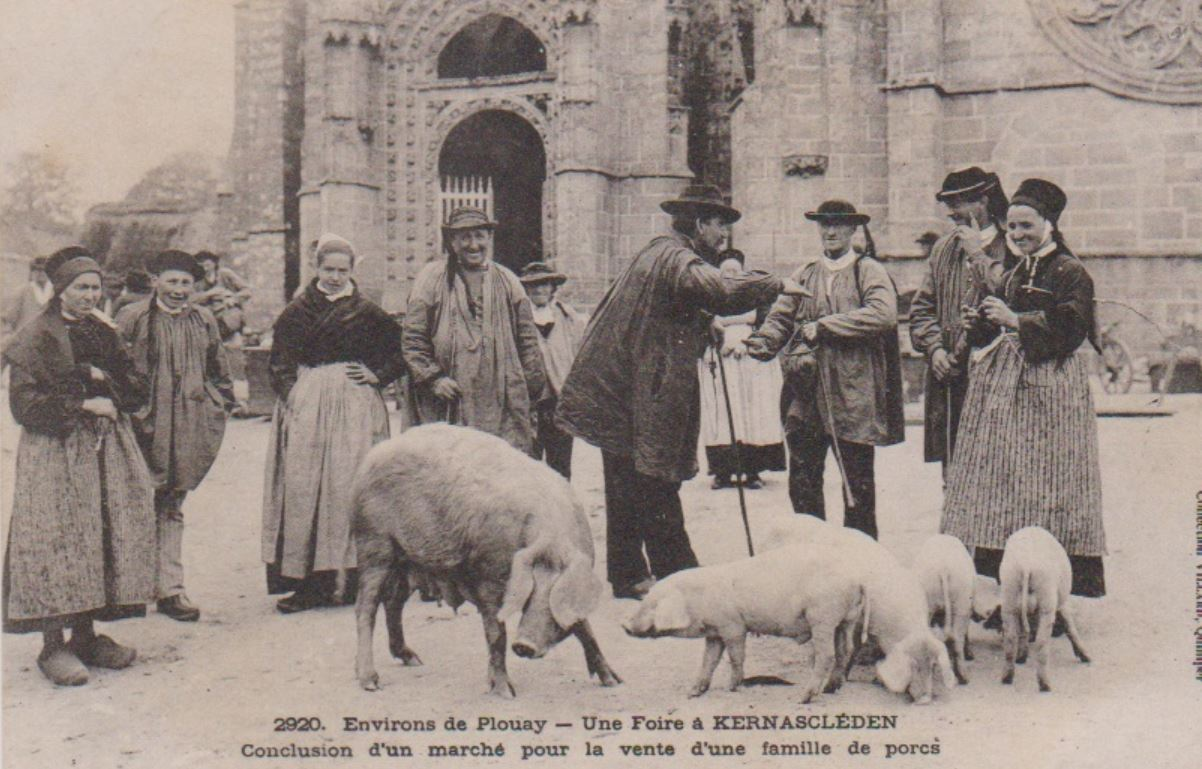
Sale of pigs (old postcard).

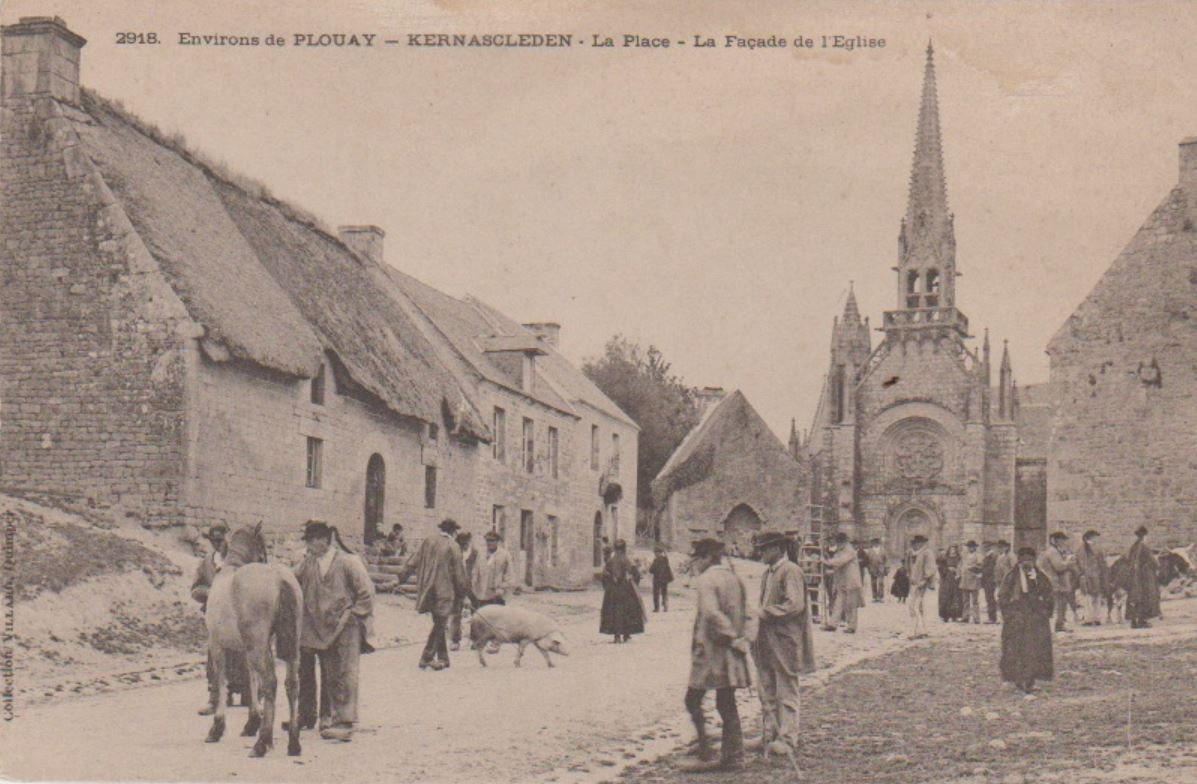
A market day in Kernascléden (postcard Villard).

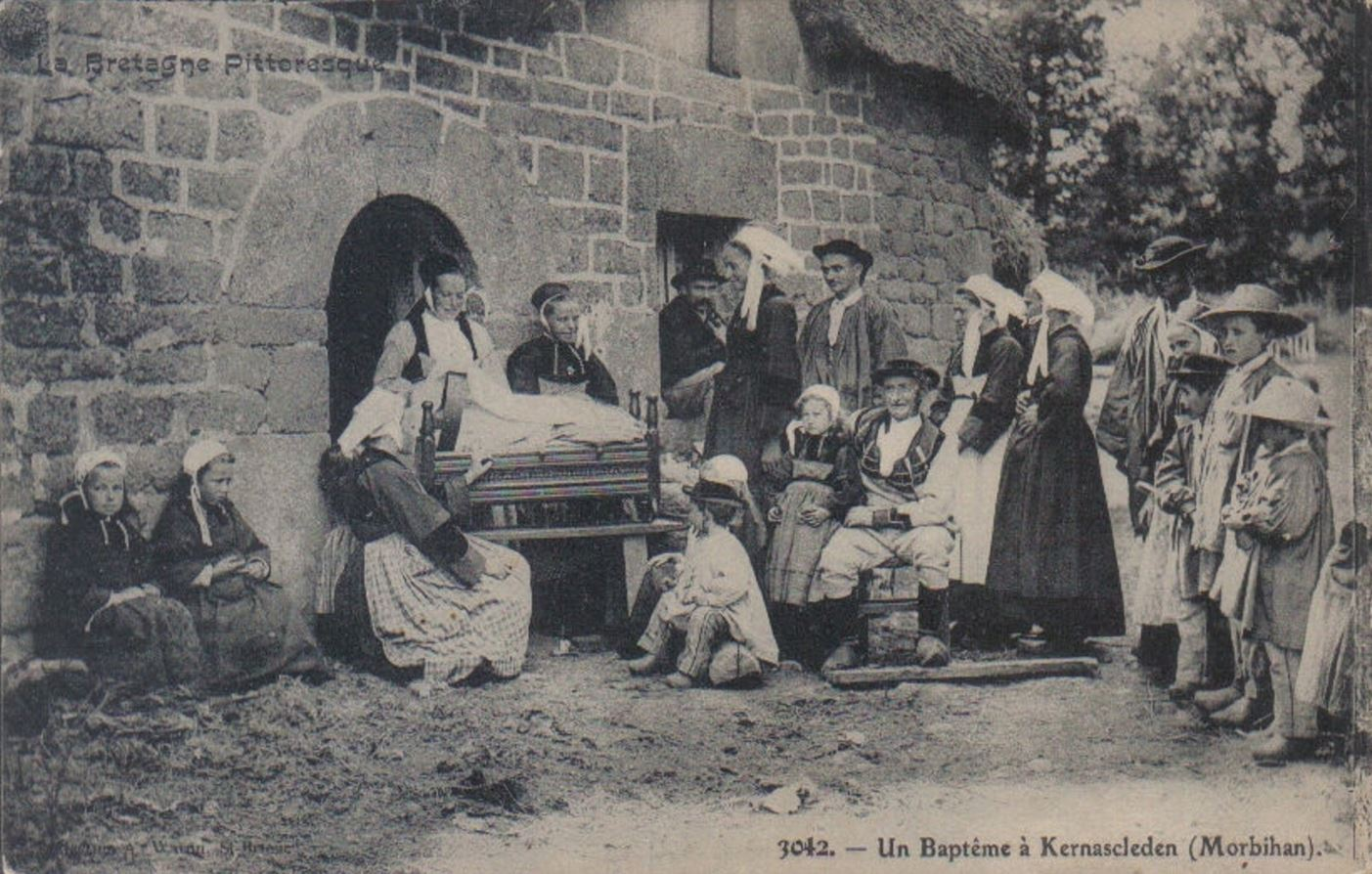
Baptism scene (postcard A.Waron)

Kenascléden was created as a new commune in 1955. Before that, it came within the administrative area of the village of Saint-Caradec-Trégomel.

== Population ==
Historical population
Year	Pop.	±% p.a.
1962	480	—
1968	468	−0.42%
1975	468	+0.00%
1982	434	−1.07%
1990	382	−1.58%
1999	355	−0.81%
2007	381	+0.89%
2012	440	+2.92%
2017	398	−1.99%
2023	418	+0.82%
Source: EHESS and INSEE (1968–2023)

Inhabitants of Kernascléden are called in French Kernascléens or Kernasclédenois.

== See also ==
- Communes of the Morbihan department
- List of works of the two Folgoët ateliers
