= Sibiril =

Sibiril Sibirill
- Commune
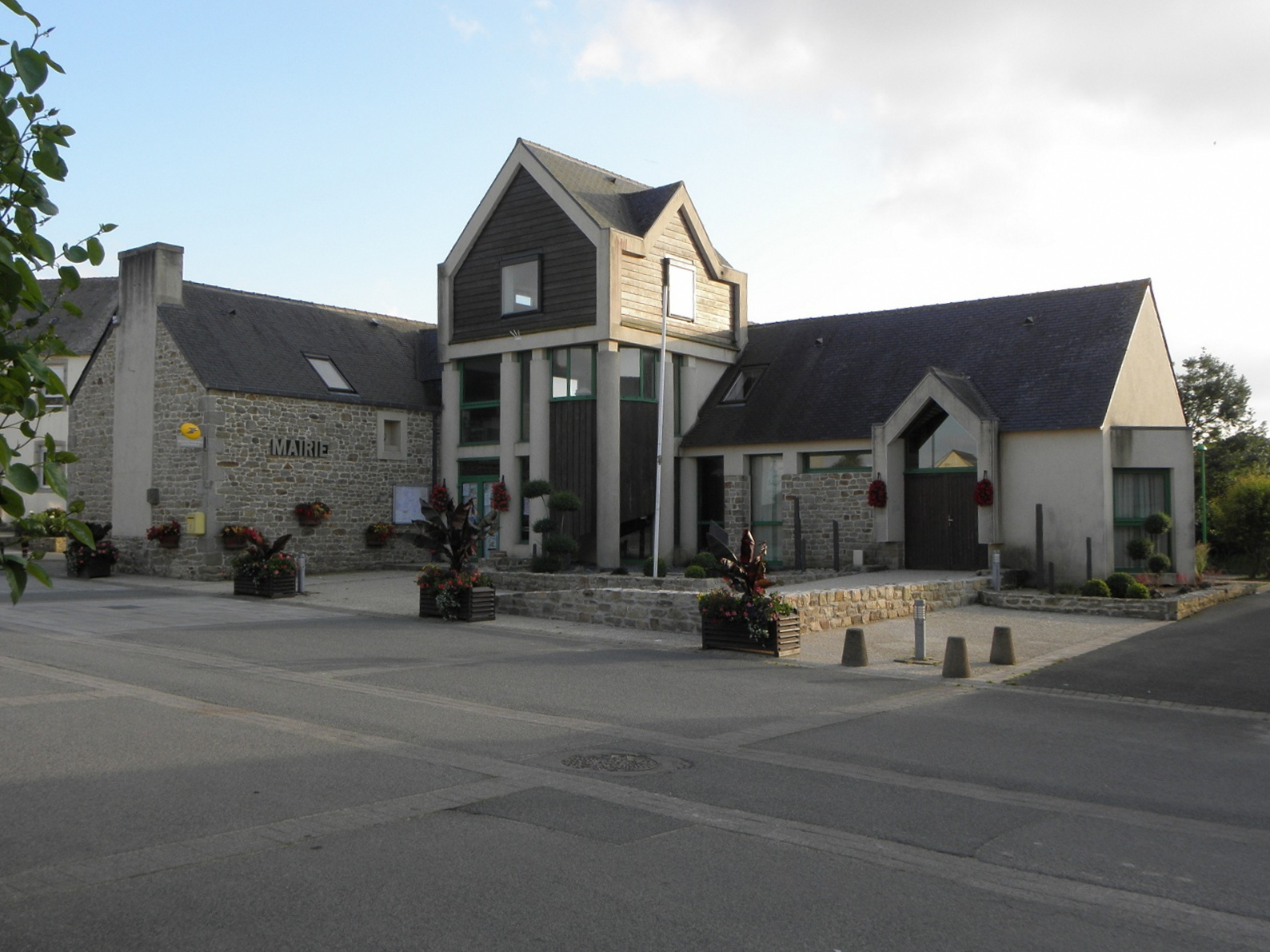
- The town hall in Sibiril
- Location of Sibiril
- Location within France Location within Brittany
- Coordinates: 48°39′55″N 4°03′46″W
- Country: France
- Region: Brittany
- Department: Finistère
- Arrondissement: Morlaix
- Canton: Saint-Pol-de-Léon
- Intercommunality: Haut-Léon Communauté

Government
  - Mayor (2020–2026): Jacques Edern
- Area^{1}: 11.47 km^{2} (4.43 sq mi)
- Highest elevation: 66 m (217 ft)
- Lowest elevation: 0 m (0 ft)
- Population (2023): 1,143
  - Density: 99.65/km^{2} (258.1/sq mi)
- Time zone: UTC+01:00 (CET)
  - Summer (DST): UTC+02:00 (CEST)
- INSEE/Postal code: 29276 /29250
- ^{1} French Land Register data, which excludes lakes, ponds, glaciers > 1 km^{2} (0.386 sq mi or 247 acres) and river estuaries.

Sibiril (French pronunciation: [sibiʁil]; Breton: Sibirill) is a commune in the Finistère department of Brittany in north-western France.

== Geography ==
=== Climate ===
Sibiril has an oceanic climate (Köppen climate classification Cfb). The average annual temperature in Sibiril is 11.7 °C (53.1 °F). The average annual rainfall is 923.6 mm (36.36 in) with December as the wettest month. The temperatures are highest on average in August, at around 17.1 °C (62.8 °F), and lowest in January, at around 7.2 °C (45.0 °F). The highest temperature ever recorded in Sibiril was 34.4 °C (93.9 °F) on 30 June 2015; the coldest temperature ever recorded was −6.9 °C (19.6 °F) on 8 February 1991.

Climate data for Sibiril (1981–2010 averages, extremes 1988−present)
Month	Jan	Feb	Mar	Apr	May	Jun	Jul	Aug	Sep	Oct	Nov	Dec	Year
Record high °C (°F)	17.1 (62.8)	22.3 (72.1)	23.9 (75.0)	28.4 (83.1)	30.4 (86.7)	34.4 (93.9)	34.0 (93.2)	33.7 (92.7)	31.4 (88.5)	29.3 (84.7)	20.7 (69.3)	18.3 (64.9)	34.4 (93.9)
Mean daily maximum °C (°F)	9.7 (49.5)	10.2 (50.4)	11.9 (53.4)	13.1 (55.6)	16.3 (61.3)	18.7 (65.7)	20.5 (68.9)	20.8 (69.4)	19.0 (66.2)	16.0 (60.8)	12.4 (54.3)	9.9 (49.8)	14.9 (58.8)
Daily mean °C (°F)	7.2 (45.0)	7.4 (45.3)	8.7 (47.7)	9.7 (49.5)	12.7 (54.9)	15.0 (59.0)	16.9 (62.4)	17.1 (62.8)	15.3 (59.5)	12.8 (55.0)	9.7 (49.5)	7.4 (45.3)	11.7 (53.1)
Mean daily minimum °C (°F)	4.7 (40.5)	4.7 (40.5)	5.6 (42.1)	6.3 (43.3)	9.2 (48.6)	11.3 (52.3)	13.2 (55.8)	13.4 (56.1)	11.6 (52.9)	9.7 (49.5)	6.9 (44.4)	4.9 (40.8)	8.5 (47.3)
Record low °C (°F)	−6.7 (19.9)	−6.9 (19.6)	−3.0 (26.6)	−1.9 (28.6)	1.4 (34.5)	4.4 (39.9)	7.1 (44.8)	6.6 (43.9)	4.0 (39.2)	−2.0 (28.4)	−2.5 (27.5)	−6.0 (21.2)	−6.9 (19.6)
Average precipitation mm (inches)	102.4 (4.03)	91.0 (3.58)	63.2 (2.49)	74.4 (2.93)	62.8 (2.47)	49.3 (1.94)	54.5 (2.15)	50.6 (1.99)	58.3 (2.30)	91.8 (3.61)	111.7 (4.40)	113.6 (4.47)	923.6 (36.36)
Average precipitation days (≥ 1.0 mm)	15.0	14.1	12.1	12.1	10.1	8.3	9.3	9.0	9.4	14.6	17.1	16.0	147.0
Source: Meteociel

== Population ==
Inhabitants of Sibiril are called in French Sibirilois.

== See also ==
- Communes of the Finistère department
- List of works of the two Folgoët ateliers
