= Ernest Renan =

French philosopher and orientalist (1823–1892)

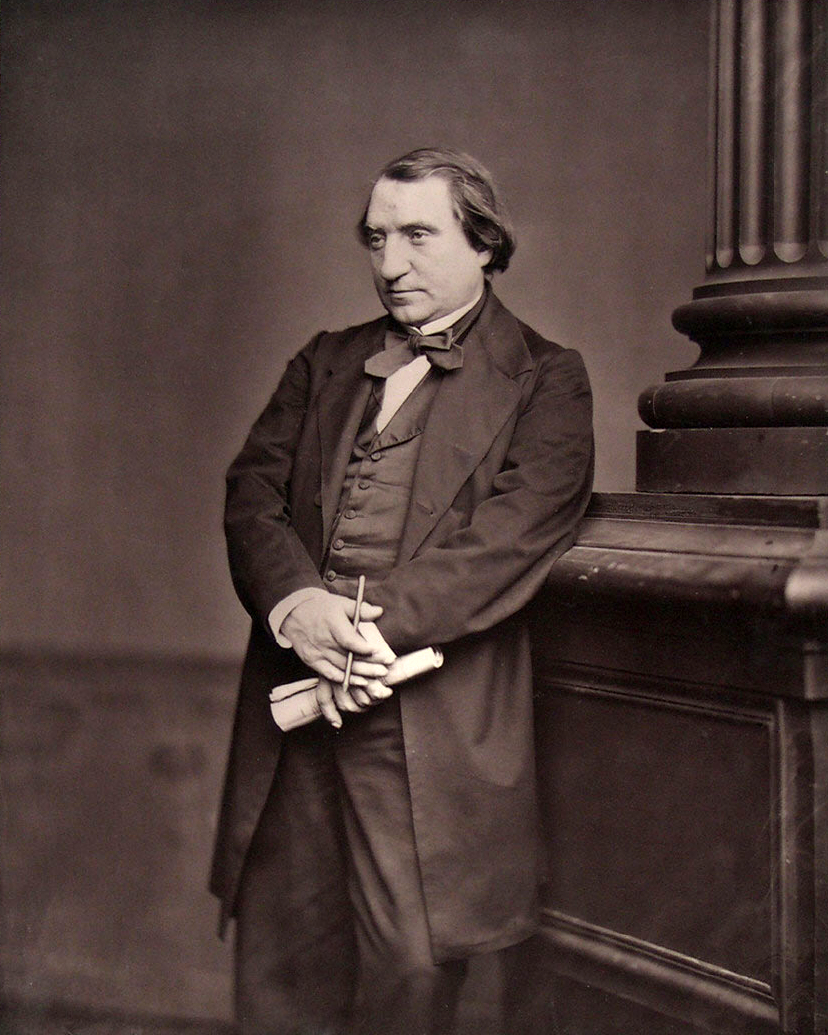
- Ernest Renan, c. 1870s
- Born: Joseph Ernest Renan; 28 February 1823; Tréguier, Kingdom of France
- Died: 2 October 1892 (aged 69); Paris, French Third Republic

Education
- Education: Saint-Sulpice Seminary
- Academic advisor: Arthur-Marie Le Hir

Philosophical work
- Era: 19th-century philosophy
- Region: Western philosophy
- School: Continental philosophy
- Institutions: Collège de France
- Main interests: History of religion, philosophy of religion, political philosophy
- Notable works: Life of Jesus (1863); What Is a Nation? (1882)
- Notable ideas: Civic nationalism

Joseph Ernest Renan (/rəˈnɑːn/ ruh-NAHN; French: [ʒozɛf ɛʁnɛst ʁənɑ̃]; 27 February 1823 – 2 October 1892) was a French Orientalist and Semitic scholar, writing on Semitic languages and civilizations, historian of religion, philologist, philosopher, biblical scholar, and critic. He wrote works on the origins of early Christianity, and espoused popular political theories especially concerning nationalism, national identity, and the supposed superiority of white people over other human races.

Renan is among the first scholars to advance the Khazar theory, which held that Ashkenazi Jews were descendants of the Khazars, Turkic peoples who had adopted the Jewish religion and allegedly migrated to central and eastern Europe following the collapse of their khanate. On this basis he alleged that the Jews were "an incomplete race."

He led an archaeological expedition "Mission to Phoenicia. 1864-1874" to Lebanon, Syria and Palestine trying to track the ancient Phoenicians.

== Life ==
=== Birth and family ===
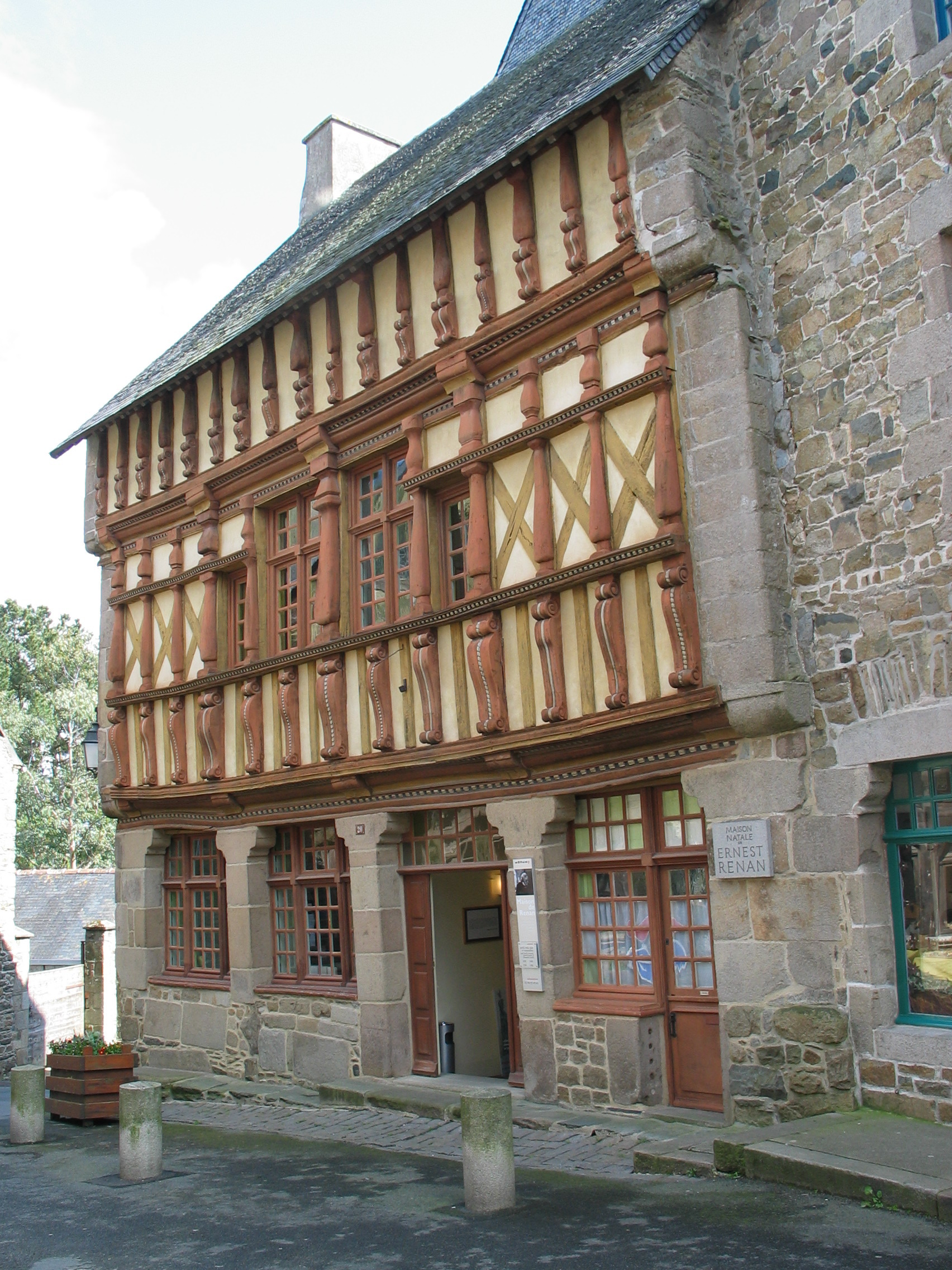
Ernest Renan birthplace museum in Tréguier

He was born at Tréguier in Brittany, in northwestern France, to a family of fishermen. His grandfather, having made a small fortune with his fishing smack, bought a house at Tréguier and settled there, and his father, captain of a small cutter and an ardent republican, married the daughter of a Royalist tradesman from the neighbouring town of Lannion. All his life, Renan was aware of the conflict between his father's and his mother's political beliefs. He was five years old when his father died, and his sister, Henriette, twelve years his senior, became the moral head of the household. Having in vain attempted to keep a school for girls at Tréguier, she departed and went to Paris as a teacher in a young ladies' boarding-school.

=== Education ===
Ernest was educated in the ecclesiastical seminary of his native town. His school reports describe him as "docile, patient, diligent, painstaking, thorough". While the Catholic priests taught him mathematics and Latin, his mother completed his education. Renan's mother was half Breton. Her paternal ancestors came from Bordeaux, and Renan used to say that in his own nature, the Gascon and the Breton were constantly at odds.

During the summer of 1838, Renan won all the prizes at the college of Tréguier. His sister told the doctor of the school in Paris where she taught about her brother, and he informed Félix Dupanloup, who was involved in organizing the ecclesiastical college of Saint-Nicolas-du-Chardonnet, a school in which the young Catholic nobility and the most talented pupils of the Catholic seminaries were to be educated together, with the idea of creating friendships between the aristocracy and the priesthood. Dupanloup sent for Renan, who was then fifteen years old and had never been outside Brittany. "I learned with stupor that knowledge was not a privilege of the Church ... I awoke to the meaning of the words talent, fame, celebrity." Religion seemed to him wholly different in Tréguier and in Paris. He came to view Abbé Dupanloup as a father figure.

=== Study at Issy-les-Moulineaux ===
In 1840, Renan left Saint Nicholas to study philosophy at the Saint-Sulpice Seminary near Paris. He entered with a passion for Catholic scholasticism. Among the philosophers, Thomas Reid and Nicolas Malebranche first attracted him, and, then he turned to Hegel, Immanuel Kant and J. G. Herder. Renan began to see a contradiction between the metaphysics which he studied and the faith he professed, but an appetite for verifiable truths restrained his scepticism. "Philosophy excites and only half satisfies the appetite for truth; I am eager for mathematics", he wrote to Henriette. Henriette had accepted in the family of Count Zamoyski an engagement more lucrative than her former job. She exercised the strongest influence over her brother.

=== Study at college of St Sulpice ===
It was not mathematics but philology which was to settle Renan's gathering doubts. His course completed at Issy, in 1844 he entered the college of St Sulpice in order to take his degree in philology prior to entering the church, and, here, he began the study of Hebrew. He realized that the second part of the Book of Isaiah differs from the first not only in style but in date, that the grammar and the history of the Pentateuch are later than the time of Moses, and that the Book of Daniel is clearly written centuries after the time in which it is set. At night he read the new novels of Victor Hugo; by day, he studied Hebrew and Syriac under Arthur-Marie Le Hir. In October 1845, Renan left Saint Sulpice for Stanislas, a lay college of the Oratorians. Still feeling too much under the domination of the church, he reluctantly ended the last of his associations with religious life and entered M. Crouzet's school for boys as a teacher.

=== Scholarly career ===
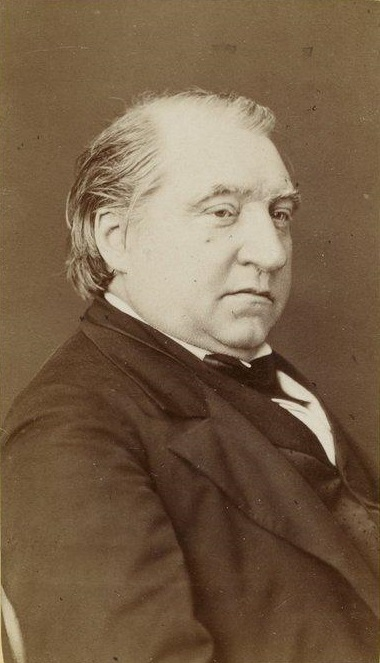
Portrait of Joseph Ernest Renan, by F. Mulnier

Renan, educated by priests, was to accept the scientific ideal with an extraordinary expansion of all his faculties. He became ravished by the splendor of the cosmos. At the end of his life, he wrote of Amiel, "The man who has time to keep a private diary has never understood the immensity of the universe." The certitudes of physical and natural science were revealed to Renan in 1846 by the chemist Marcellin Berthelot, then a young man of eighteen, his pupil at M. Crouzet's school. To the day of Renan's death, their friendship continued. Renan was occupied as usher only during evenings. During the daytime, he continued his researches in Semitic philology. In 1847, he obtained the Volney prize, one of the principal distinctions awarded by the Academy of Inscriptions, for the manuscript of his "General History of Semitic Languages." In 1847, he took his degree as Agrégé de Philosophie – that is to say, fellow of the university – and was offered a job as master in the lycée Vendôme.

In 1856, Renan married in Paris Cornélie Scheffer, daughter of Hendrik Scheffer and niece of Ary Scheffer, both French painters of Dutch descent. They had two children, Ary Renan, born in 1858, who became a painter, and Noémi, born in 1862, who eventually married philologist Yannis Psycharis. In 1863, the American Philosophical Society elected him an international Member.

==== Life of Jesus ====
Within his lifetime, Renan was best known as the author of the enormously popular Life of Jesus (Vie de Jésus, 1863). Renan attributed the idea of the book to his sister, Henriette, with whom he was traveling in Ottoman Syria and Palestine when, struck with a fever, she died suddenly. With only a New Testament and copy of Josephus as references, he began writing. The book was first translated into English in the year of its publication by Charles E. Wilbour and has remained in print for the past 145 years. Renan's Life of Jesus was lavished with ironic praise and criticism by Albert Schweitzer in his book The Quest of the Historical Jesus.

Renan argued Jesus was able to purify himself of "Jewish traits" and that he became an Aryan. His Life of Jesus promoted racial ideas and infused race into theology and the person of Jesus; he depicted Jesus as a Galilean who was transformed from a Jew into a Christian, and that Christianity emerged purified of any Jewish influences. The book was based largely on the Gospel of John, and was a scholarly work. It depicted Jesus as a man but not God, and rejected the miracles of the Gospel. Renan believed by humanizing Jesus he was restoring to him a greater dignity. The book's controversial assertions that the life of Jesus should be written like the life of any historic person, and that the Bible could and should be subject to the same critical scrutiny as other historical documents caused controversy and enraged many Christians. It likewise provoked anger within the Jewish community due to its depiction of Judaism as foolish and absurdly illogical, and for its insistence that Jesus and Christianity were superior to Judaism.

American historian George Mosse, in Toward the Final Solution. A History of European Racism (pp 88, 129–130) argues that according to Renan, the intolerance would be a Jewish and not a Christian characteristic, but biblical Judaism would have lost its importance even among the Jews themselves as civilization progressed. That is why modern Jews are no longer disadvantaged by their past and are able to make important contributions to modern progress.

=== Continuation of scholarly career: social views ===
In his book on St. Paul, as in the Apostles, he shows his concern with the larger social life, his sense of fraternity, and a revival of the democratic sentiment which had inspired L'Avenir de la Science. In 1869, he presented himself as the candidate of the liberal opposition at the parliamentary election for Meaux. While his temper had become less aristocratic, his liberalism had grown more tolerant. On the eve of its dissolution, Renan was half prepared to accept the Empire, and, had he been elected to the Chamber of Deputies, he would have joined the group of l'Empire liberal, but he was not elected. A year later, war was declared with Germany; the Second Empire was abolished, and Napoleon III became an exile. The Franco-Prussian War was a turning-point in Renan's history. Germany had always been to him the asylum of thought and disinterested science. Now, he saw the land of his ideal destroy and ruin the land of his birth; he beheld the German no longer as a priest, but as an invader.

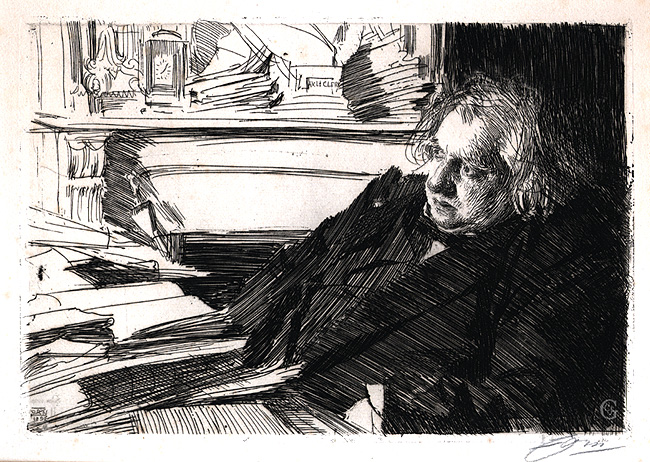
Ernest Renan in his study by Anders Zorn

In La Réforme Intellectuelle et Morale (1871), Renan tried to safeguard France's future. Yet, he was still influenced by Germany. The ideal and the discipline which he proposed to his defeated country were those of her conqueror—a feudal society, a monarchical government, an elite which the rest of the nation exists merely to support and nourish; an ideal of honor and duty imposed by a chosen few on the recalcitrant and subject multitude. The errors attributed to the Commune confirmed Renan in this reaction. At the same time, the irony always perceptible in his work grows more bitter. His Dialogues Philosophiques, written in 1871, his Ecclesiastes (1882) and his Antichrist (1876) (the fourth volume of the Origins of Christianity, dealing with the reign of Nero) are incomparable in their literary genius, but they are examples of a disenchanted and sceptical temper. He had vainly tried to make his country obey his precepts. The progress of events showed him, on the contrary, a France which, every day, left a little stronger, and he roused himself from his disbelieving, disillusioned mood and observed with interest the struggle for justice and liberty of a democratic society. The fifth and sixth volumes of the Origins of Christianity (the Christian Church and Marcus Aurelius) show him reconciled with democracy, confident in the gradual ascent of man, aware that the greatest catastrophes do not really interrupt the sure if imperceptible progress of the world and reconciled, also, if not with the truths, at least with the moral beauties of Catholicism and with the remembrance of his pious youth.

==== Definition of nationhood ====
Renan's definition of a nation has been extremely influential. This was given in his 1882 discourse What is a Nation? (Qu'est-ce qu'une nation?). Whereas German writers like Fichte had defined the nation by objective criteria such as a race or an ethnic group "sharing common characteristics" (language, etc.), Renan defined it by the desire of a people to live together, which he summarized by a famous phrase, "having done great things together and wishing to do more". (Note: "French: avoir fait de grandes choses ensemble, vouloir en faire encore") Writing in the midst of the dispute concerning the Alsace-Lorraine region, he declared that the existence of a nation was based on a "daily plebiscite." Some authors criticize that definition, based on a "daily plebiscite", because of the ambiguity of the concept. They argue that this definition is an idealization and it should be interpreted within the German tradition and not in opposition to it. They say that the arguments used by Renan at the conference What is a Nation? are not consistent with his thinking.

Karl Deutsch (in "Nationalism and its alternatives") wrote "'A Nation,' so goes a rueful European saying, 'is a group of persons united by a common error about their ancestry and a common dislike of their neighbors.'" This phrase is frequently, but mistakenly, attributed to Renan himself. He did indeed write that if "the essential element of a nation is that all its individuals must have many things in common", they "must also have forgotten many things. Every French citizen must have forgotten the night of St. Bartholomew and the massacres in the 13th century in the South."

Renan believed "Nations are not eternal. They had a beginning and they will have an end. And they will probably be replaced by a European confederation."

Renan's work has especially influenced 20th-century theorist of nationalism Benedict Anderson.

=== Late scholarly career ===
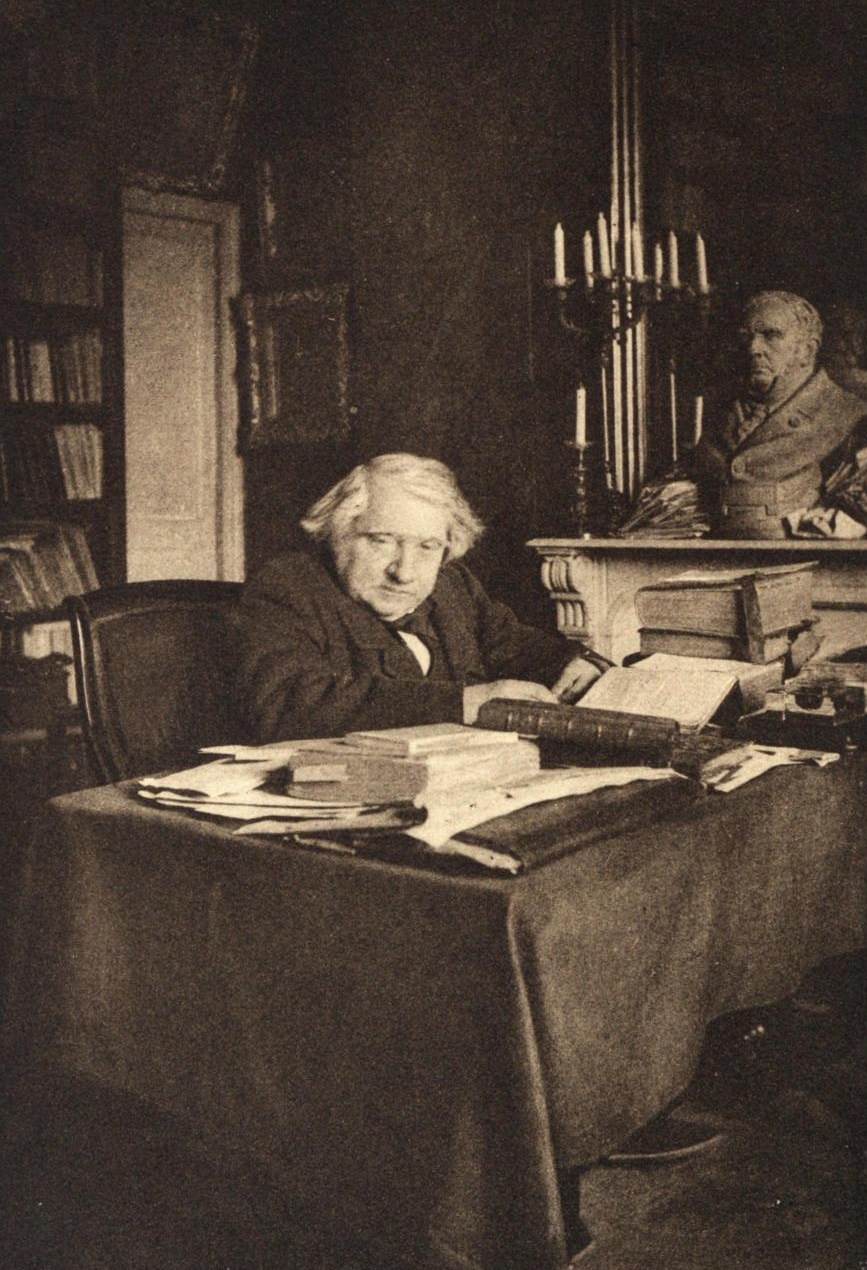
Renan in his study in the College of France

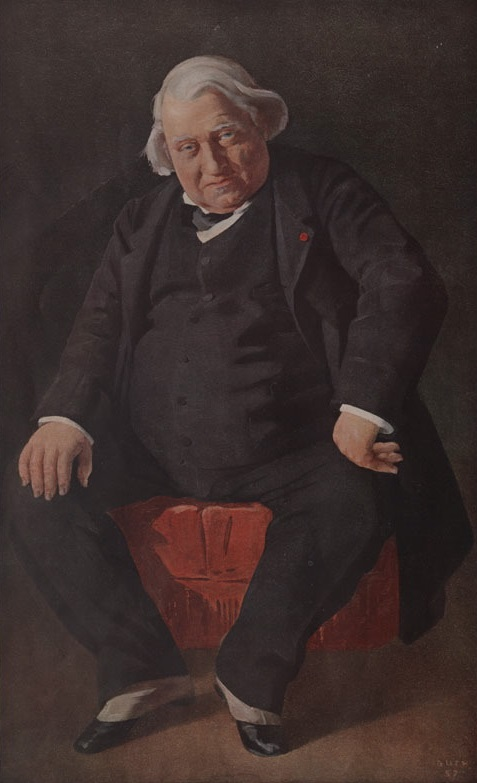
Renan caricatured by GUTH in Vanity Fair, 1910

Shifting away from his pessimism regarding liberalism's prospects during the 1870s while still believing in the necessity of an intellectual elite to influence democratic society for the good, Renan rallied to support the French Third Republic, humorously describing himself as a légitimiste, that is, a person who needs "about ten years to accustom myself to regarding any government as legitimate," and adding "I, who am not a republican a priori, who am a simple Liberal quite willing to adjust myself to a constitutional monarchy, would be more loyal to the Republic than newly converted republicans." The progress of the sciences under the Republic and the latitude given to the freedom of thought that Renan cherished above all had allayed many of his previous fears, and he opposed the deterministic and fatalist theories of philosophers like Hippolyte Taine.

As he got older, he contemplated his childhood. He was nearly sixty when, in 1883, he published the autobiographical Souvenirs d'Enfance et de Jeunesse which, after the Life of Jesus, is the work by which he is chiefly known.

They showed the blasé modern reader that a world no less poetic, no less primitive than that of the Origins of Christianity still existed within living memory on the northwestern coast of France. It has the Celtic magic of ancient romance and the simplicity, the naturalness, and the veracity which the 19th century prized so highly. But his Ecclesiastes, published a few months earlier, his Drames Philosophiques, collected in 1888, give a more adequate image of his critical, disenchanted, yet optimistic spirit. They show the attitude towards uncultured Socialism of a philosopher liberal by conviction, by temperament an aristocrat. We learn in them how Caliban (democracy), the mindless brute, educated to his own responsibility, makes after all an adequate ruler; how Prospero (the aristocratic principle or the mind) accepts his dethronement for the sake of greater liberty in the intellectual world, since Caliban proves an effective policeman and leaves his superiors a free hand in the laboratory; how Ariel (the religious principle) acquires a firmer hold on life and no longer gives up the ghost at the faintest hint of change. Indeed, Ariel flourishes in the service of Prospero under the external government of the many-headed brute. Religion and knowledge are as imperishable as the world they dignify. Thus, out of the depths rises unvanquished the essential idealism of Renan.

Renan was prolific. At sixty years of age, having finished the Origins of Christianity, he began his History of Israel, based on a lifelong study of the Old Testament and on the Corpus Inscriptionum Semiticarum, published by the Académie des Inscriptions under Renan's direction from the year 1881 till the end of his life. The first volume of the History of Israel appeared in 1887; the third, in 1891; the last two posthumously. As a history of facts and theories, the book has many faults; as an essay on the evolution of the religious idea, it is (despite some passages of frivolity, irony, or incoherence) of extraordinary importance; as a reflection of the mind of Renan, it is the most lifelike of images. In a volume of collected essays, Feuilles Détachées, published also in 1891, we find the same mental attitude, an affirmation of the necessity of piety independent of dogma. During his last years, he received many honors, and was made an administrator of the Collège de France and grand officer of the Legion of Honor. Two volumes of the History of Israel, his correspondence with his sister Henriette, his Letters to M. Berthelot, and the History of the Religious Policy of Philippe-le-Bel, which he wrote in the years immediately before his marriage, all appeared during the last eight years of the 19th century.

Renan died after a few days' illness in 1892 in Paris, and was buried in the Cimetière de Montmartre in the Montmartre Quarter.

== Reputation and controversies ==
Hugely influential in his lifetime, Renan was eulogised after his death as the embodiment of the progressive spirit in western culture. Anatole France wrote that Renan was the incarnation of modernity. Renan's works were read and appreciated by many of the leading literary figures of the time, including James Joyce, Marcel Proust, Matthew Arnold, Edith Wharton, and Charles Augustin Sainte-Beuve. Renan's interpretations of history become the subject of frequent polemical sniping in Jacob Burckhardt's lectures at Basel University, also receiving sustained and acid criticism from his (posthumously better-known) colleague and faculty member at Basel in Nietzsche's later works where Renan appears as a go-to exemplar of ressentiment. One of his greatest admirers was Manuel González Prada in Peru who took the Life of Jesus as a basis for his anticlericalism. In his 1932 document "The Doctrine of Fascism", Italian dictator Benito Mussolini also applauded perceived "prefascist intuitions" in a section of Renan's "Meditations" that argued against democracy and individual rights as "chimerical" and intrinsically opposed to "nature's plans".

=== Statue ===
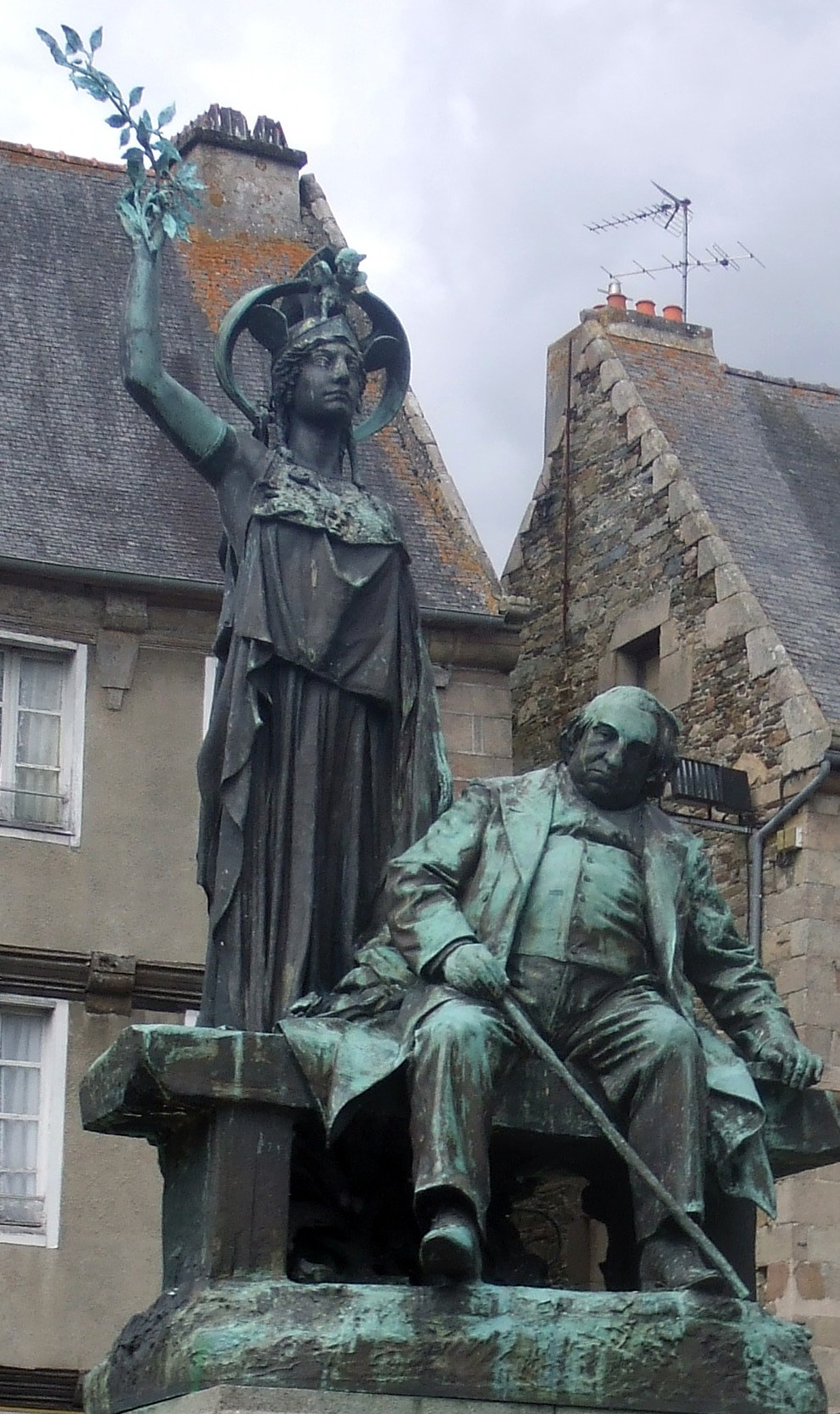
Statue of Ernest Renan in Tréguier town square

In 1903 a major controversy accompanied the installation of a monument in Tréguier designed by Jean Boucher. Placed in the local cathedral square, it was interpreted as a challenge to Catholicism, and led to widespread protests, especially because the site was normally used for the temporary pulpit erected at the traditional Catholic festival of the Pardon of St Yves. It also included the Greek goddess Athena raising her arm to crown Renan gesturing in apparent challenge towards the cathedral. The local clergy organised a protest calvary sculpture designed by Yves Hernot as "a symbol of the triumphant ultramontaine church."

=== Views on race ===
Renan believed that racial characteristics were instinctual and deterministic. Renan believed that the Semitic race was inferior to the Indo-European race. Renan claimed that the Semitic mind was limited by dogmatism and lacked a cosmopolitan conception of civilisation. For Renan, Semites were "an incomplete race." Some authors argue that Renan developed his antisemitism from Voltaire's anti-Judaism. Hannah Arendt wrote that Renan was probably the first to characterize the Semitic and Aryan races as being in opposition to each other in an essential division of mankind.

He did not regard the Ashkenazi Jews of Europe as being a Semitic people. Renan is acknowledged for launching the so-called Khazar theory. This theory states that Ashkenazim had their origin in Turkic refugees that had converted to Judaism and later migrated from the collapsed Khazar Khanate westward into the Rhineland, and exchanged their native Khazar language for the Yiddish language while continuing to practice the Jewish religion. In his 1883 lecture "Le Judaïsme comme race et comme religion" ("transl. Judaism as a race and as a religion") he disputed the concept that Jewish people constitute a unified racial entity in a biological sense, which made his views unpalatable within racial antisemitism. Renan was also known for being a strong critic of German ethnic nationalism, with its antisemitic undertones. His notions of race and ethnicity were completely at odds with the European antisemitism of the 19th and 20th centuries.

Renan wrote the following about the long history of persecution of Jews:

When all nations and all ages have persecuted you, there must be some motive behind it all. The Jew, up to our own time, insinuated himself everywhere, claiming the protection of the common law; but, in reality, remaining outside the common law. He retained his own status; he wished to have the same guarantees as everyone else, and, over and above that, his own exceptions and special laws. He desired the advantages of the nations without being a nation, without helping to bear the burdens of the nations. No people has ever been able to tolerate this. The nations are military creations founded and maintained by the sword; they are the work of peasants and soldiers; towards establishing them the Jews have contributed nothing. Herein is the great fallacy inspired in Israelite pretensions. The tolerated alien can be useful to a country, but only on condition that the country does not allow itself to be invaded by him. It is not fair to claim family rights in a house which one has not built, like those birds which come and take up their quarters in a nest which does not belong to them, or like the crustaceans which steal the shell of another species.

However, during the 1880s, Renan shifted away from these views. In a lecture on "Judaism as a Race and as a Religion", he stated:

When, in 1791, the National Assembly decreed the emancipation of the Jews, it concerned itself very little with race. It considered that men ought to be judged, not by the blood that runs in their veins, but by their moral and intellectual value. It is the glory of France to take these questions by their human side. The work of the nineteenth century is to tear down every ghetto, and I have no praise for those who seek to rebuild them. The Israelite race has in the past rendered the greatest services to the world. Blended with the different nations, in harmony with the diverse national unities of Europe, it will continue to do in the future what it has done in the past. By its collaboration with all the liberal forces of Europe, it will contribute eminently to the social progress of humanity.

During a 1882 conference concerning What Is a Nation?, Renan spoke out against racial theories:

Both the principle of nations is right and legitimate, as that of the primordial right of races is wrong and full of dangers for true progress … The truth is that pure race does not exist and that to base politics on ethnographic analysis means to base it on a chimera.

In 1883, in a lecture called "The Original Identity and Gradual Separation of Judaism and Christianity", he said:

Judaism, which has served so well in the past, will still serve in the future. It will serve the true cause of liberalism, of the modern spirit. Every Jew is a liberal ... The enemies of Judaism, however, if you only look at them more closely, you will see that they are the enemies of the modern spirit in general.

Other comments on race have also proven controversial, especially his belief that political policy should take into account supposed racial differences:

Nature has made a race of workers, the Chinese race, who have wonderful manual dexterity and almost no sense of honor... A race of tillers of the soil, the Negro; treat him with kindness and humanity, and all will be as it should; a race of masters and soldiers, the European race. Reduce this noble race to working in the ergastulum like Negroes and Chinese, and they rebel... But the life at which our workers rebel would make a Chinese or a fellah happy, as they are not military creatures in the least. Let each one do what he is made for, and all will be well.

This passage, among others, was cited by Aimé Césaire in his Discours sur le colonialisme, as evidence of the alleged hypocrisy of Western humanism and its "sordidly racist" conception of the rights of man.

=== Republican racism ===
Renan played a pivotal role in shaping racialist thought as it developed across Europe, and more specifically, within the intellectual climate of the French Third Republic. Although Renan was a proponent of the right to self-determination, he also subscribed to the idea that an established "racial hierarchy of peoples" existed. Discursively, he subordinated the principle of self-determination of peoples to a racial hierarchy; in other words, he supported colonialist expansion and the racist view of the Third Republic because he believed the French to be hierarchically superior in terms of race to the African nations. This form of racism, termed "Republican racism" by Gilles Manceron, was widespread in France during the Third Republic and frequently served to justify European colonial expansion. Supporters of colonialism used the concept of cultural superiority, and described themselves as "protectors of civilization", to justify their colonial actions and territorial expansion. Another reason for Renan's support of colonialism was that, in his view, "a nation which does not colonize is irrevocably doomed to socialism, to the war between rich and poor".

== Honours ==
- The armoured cruiser Ernest Renan, launched in 1906, was named in his honour.
- The community of Renan, Virginia was named after him.

== Archives and memorabilia ==
- Musée de la Vie romantique, Hôtel Scheffer-Renan, Paris

== Works ==
- (1848). De l'origine du langage.
- (1852). Averroës et l'averroïsme.
- (1852). De Philosophia Peripatetica, apud Syros.
- (1854). L'Âme bretonne.
- (1855). Histoire générale et systèmes comparés des langues sémitiques.
- (1857). Études d'histoire religieuse.
- (1858). Le Livre de Job.
- (1859). Essais de morale et de critique.
- (1860). Le Cantique des cantiques.
- (1862). Henriette Renan, souvenir pour ceux qui l'ont connue.
- (1863–1881). Histoire des origines du christianisme:
  - (1863). Vie de Jésus.
  - (1866). Les Apôtres.
  - (1869). Saint Paul.
  - (1873). L'Antéchrist.
  - (1877). Les Évangiles et la seconde génération chrétienne.
  - (1879). L'Église chrétienne.
  - (1882). Marc-Aurèle ou la Fin du monde antique.
  - (1883). Index.
- (1864). Mission de Phénicie (1865–1874)
- (1865). Prière sur l'Acropole.
- (1865). Histoire littéraire de la France au XIVe siècle [with Victor Le Clerc].
- (1868). Questions contemporaines.
- (1871). La Réforme intellectuelle et morale de la France.
- (1876). Dialogues et fragments philosophiques.
- (1878). Mélanges d'histoire et de voyages.
- (1878–1886). Drames philosophiques:
  - (1878). Caliban.
  - (1881). L'Eau de jouvance.
  - (1885). Le Prêtre de Némi.
  - (1886). L'Abbesse de Jouarre.
- (1880). Conférences d'Angleterre.
- (1881). L'Ecclésiaste.
- (1882). Qu'est-ce qu'une Nation?
- (1883). Islam and Science: A lecture presented at La Sorbonne, 29 March 1883.
- (1883). Souvenirs d'enfance et de jeunesse.
- (1884). Nouvelles études d'histoire religieuse.
- (1884). Le Bouddhisme.
- (1887). Discours et conférences.
- (1887–1893). Histoire du peuple d'Israël [5 volumes].
- (1889). Examen de conscience philosophique.
- (1890). L'Avenir de la science, pensées de 1848.
- (1892). Feuilles détachées.
- (1899). Études sur la politique religieuse du règne de Philippe le Bel.
- (1904). Mélanges religieux et historiques.
- (1908). Patrice.
- (1914). Fragments intimes et romanesques.
- (1921). Essai psycologique sur Jésus-Christ.
- (1928). Voyages: Italie, Norvège.
- (1928). Sur Corneille, Racine et Bossuet.
- (1945). Ernest Renan et l'Allemagne.

Works in English translation

- (1862). An Essay on the Age and Antiquity of the Book of Nabathaean Agriculture. London: Trübner & Co.
- (1864). Studies of Religious History and Criticism. New York: Carleton Publisher.
- (1864). The Life of Jesus. London: Trübner & Co.
- (1866). The Apostles. New York: Carleton Publisher.
- (1868). Saint Paul. London: The Temple Company.
- (1871). Constitutional Monarchy in France. Boston: Robert Brothers.
- (1885). Lectures on the Influence of the Institutions, Thought and Culture of Rome, on Christianity and the Development of the Catholic Church. London: Williams & Norgate (The Hibbert Lectures).
  - (1888). English Conferences of Ernest Renan. Boston: James R. Osgood and Company.
- (1888–1895). History of the People of Israel. London: Chapman & Hall [5 vols.]
- (1888). Marcus-Aurelius. London: Mathieson & Company.
- (1888). The Abbess of Jouarre. New York: G.W. Dillingham.
- (1889). The Gospels. London: Mathieson & Company.
- (1890). The Antichrist. London: Mathieson & Company.
- (1890). Cohelet; or, the Preacher. London: Mathieson & Company.
- (1891). The Future of Science. London: Chapman & Hall.
- (1891). The Song of Songs. London: W.M. Thomson.
- (1892). Recollections and Letters of Ernest Renan. New York: Cassell Publishing Company.
- (1893). The Book of Job. London: W.M. Thomson.
- (1895). My Sister Henrietta. Boston: Robert Brothers.
- (1896). Brother and Sister: A Memoir and the Letters of Ernest & Henriette Renan. London: William Heinemann.
- (1896). Caliban: A Philosophical Drama. London: The Shakespeare Press.
- (1896). The Poetry of the Celtic Races, and Other Essays. London: The Walter Scott Publishing Co.
- (1904). Renan's Letters from the Holy Land. New York: Doubleday, Page & Company.
- (1935). The Memoirs of Ernest Renan. London: G. Bles.

== See also ==
- Baal Lebanon inscription
- Hiram's Tomb
- Hortense Cornu
- Modernism in the Catholic Church
- Postcolonialism
- Right to exist
- Royal necropolis of Byblos
- Tyre, Lebanon
- Umm al-Amad votive inscription
