= Right to exist =

Conceptual right of nations

The right to exist is a concept in political philosophy and international relations referring to a claimed right of a state (or nation) to exist based on its perceived political legitimacy. A state's right to exist is neither codified in international law nor, with some exceptions, recognized as a distinct legal category by the majority of international-law scholarship.

A doctrine of fundamental rights of states — including a right to political existence, self-preservation, and continuity — was widely discussed among international lawyers from the 18th century onward. A proposed right to exist was considered but ultimately excluded from the International Law Commission's 1949 draft Declaration on Rights and Duties of States, and the draft declaration itself was never adopted by the UN General Assembly.

In his 1882 essay "What Is a Nation?", French philosopher Ernest Renan argued that a nation possesses the right to exist so long as its members demonstrate a willingness to make sacrifices for the community it represents, describing it as a "daily plebiscite."

The phrase has featured prominently with regard to the legitimacy of the State of Israel in the context of the Israeli–Palestinian conflict.

== Political philosophy and international law ==
What a "state right to exist" actually is remains unclear.

In the 18th and especially the 19th century, a theory of international law shaped by ideas of natural law was widespread and still found adherents well into the mid-20th century, according to which states, like persons, could hold fundamental rights. Several proponents of this theory also assumed a state right to exist, at times even regarding it as "the essential right as such". In the scholarly literature, however, it functioned more as an empty shell from which further fundamental rights could then be derived.

In the early 20th century there were also several initiatives to codify fundamental rights of states; these often included a right to exist or a corresponding principle. Toward the end of these initiatives, however, this right had disappeared from the drafts: in 1948 the Organization of American States instead recognized a fundamental state right "to live its own life". A year later, a right to exist still appeared in several drafts for an (ultimately unadopted) declaration of fundamental rights by the United Nations. However, the International Law Commission ultimately voted, seven to five, to remove it from its draft declaration, with several members calling it a legal truism and others wary that affirming such a right could not be cleanly separated from the question of which entities were entitled to statehood — foreshadowing the later debate over colonized peoples' right to self-determination. Consideration of the declaration was subsequently postponed indefinitely by the General Assembly and never revisited. Since the 1950s, the ideas of fundamental rights of states and of a state right to exist have also largely disappeared from works of international-law theory.

Accordingly, on the prevailing view, a "state right to exist" is today not a recognized right; no state thus has a right to exist that is distinct from the state rights to sovereignty and territorial integrity, from the right to "live in peace within secure and recognized borders free from threats or acts of force", from the group-based right of self-determination, or from the diplomatic act of the recognition of states.

Notwithstanding this majority view, several contemporary scholars continue to argue for some version of a state's right to exist. Among contemporary international lawyers, Volker Epping argues that such a right exists:

All states have, vis-à-vis the community of states, a right to respect for their existence under international law. This right is to be regarded as the foundation of all other rights that a state can assert [...]. Strictly speaking, the right to exist is a right to the continuation of a state's existence, and thus primarily a right to respect for the inviolability of a state's territorial integrity and political independence. [...] From the principle of the inviolability of a state's political independence follows the right of self-defense in the case of existence-threatening acts by other states [...].

— Volker Epping, in Knut Ipsen (ed.), Völkerrecht (2024)

By contrast, Jure Vidmar argues against the traditional "anthropomorphic" doctrine of fundamental rights of states, but nonetheless finds that an existing state has a narrower, non-absolute right not to be extinguished or territorially diminished by outside force, grounded in the principle of territorial integrity and reflected in the International Court of Justice's recognition of a "fundamental right of every State to survival"; he denies, however, any corresponding right of an entity to come into existence as a state.

Similarly rejecting the term "right to exist" as a distinct legal category, three German legal scholars nonetheless argue that the protection of the continued existence of established states — following from sovereignty and, additionally, the right of peoples to self-determination — constitutes a bundle of legal positions that can be described, in a broader sense, as a "right to exist".

== Historical use ==
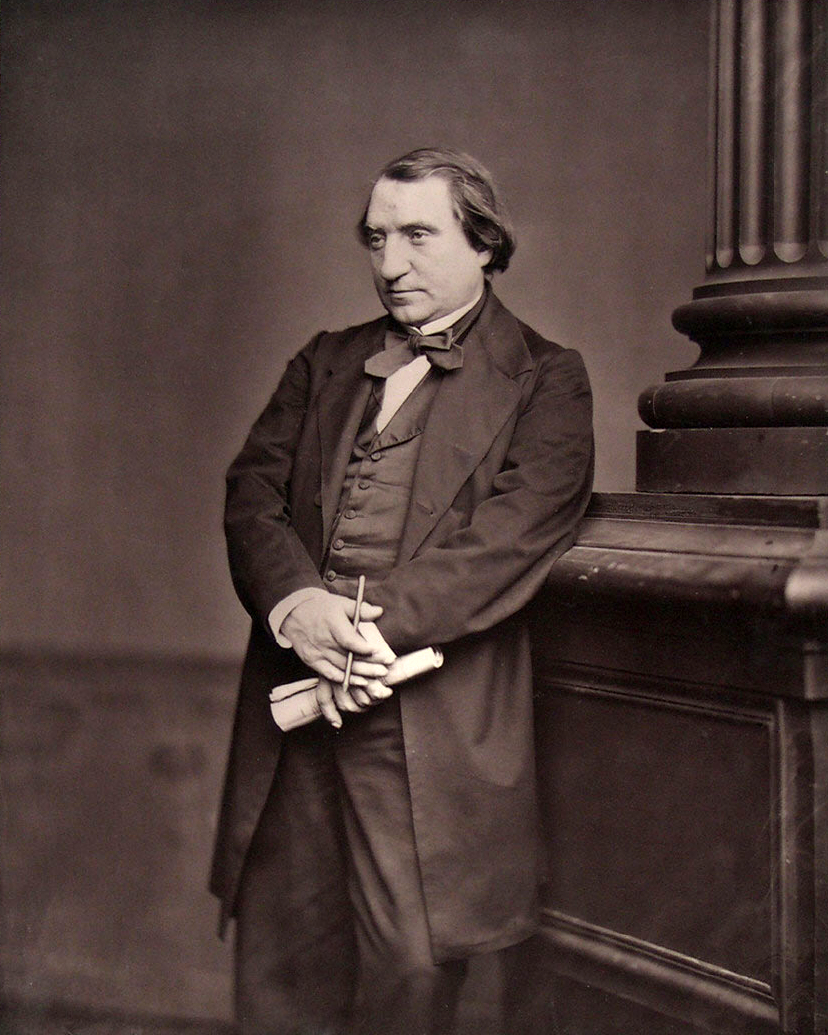
French historian Ernest Renan defended the right to exist in "What Is a Nation?" (1882).

The concept of a right to exist for states or nations has roots in early modern political thought. In his 1795 work "Dissertation on First Principles of Government", Thomas Paine argued that representative government has a right to exist, while that hereditary government does not, grounding legitimacy in the consent and rights of the people rather than tradition or inheritance.

In 1823, during the Greek War of Independence against Ottoman rule, Sir Walter Scott invoked the idea of a "right to exist in the Greek people".

The idea received influential philosophical treatment in Ernest Renan's 1882 essay "What Is a Nation?". Renan wrote that a nation has the right to exist "so long as this moral consciousness gives proof of its strength by the sacrifices which demand the abdication of the individual to the advantage of the community." He further described national existence as "a daily plebiscite, just as an individual's existence is a perpetual affirmation of life."

The phrase saw increased use during the decline and breakup of the Ottoman Empire. In 1903, Eliakim and Robert Littell wrote in The Living Age: "If Turkey has a right to exist – and the Powers are very prompt to assert that she has – she possesses an equally good right to defend herself against all attempts to imperil her political existence."

== Examples ==
=== Armenia ===
The right to exist of Armenia became known as the Armenian question during the Congress of Berlin in 1878, and would again be asked during the Armenian genocide in World War I.

=== Basque Country ===
According to Basque nationalists, "Euzkadi (the name of our country in our own language) is the country of the Basques with as such right to exist independently as a state as Poland or Ireland. The Basques are a very ancient people..."

=== Israel and Palestine ===
In 1947, a United Nations General Assembly resolution provided for the creation of an "Arab State" and a "Jewish State" to exist within Palestine in the United Nations Partition Plan for Palestine. The Jewish Agency for Israel, precursor to the Israeli government, agreed to the plan, but the Palestinians rejected it and fighting broke out. After Israel's 14 May 1948 unilateral declaration of independence, support from neighboring Arab states escalated the 1947–48 Civil War in Mandatory Palestine into the 1948 Arab–Israeli War. The legal and territorial status of Israel and Palestine is still hotly disputed in the region and within the international community.

In September 1967, the Arab leaders adopted a hardline "three nos" position in the Khartoum Resolution: no peace with Israel, no recognition of Israel, and no negotiations with Israel. In November 1967, Egyptian government spokesman Mohammed H. el-Zayyat argued that the 1949 Egyptian–Israeli Armistice Agreement had already implicitly guaranteed Israel's right to exist. Pointing out that Egypt had never repudiated it, he nevertheless distinguished this acknowledgment from formal recognition of Israel. In the same month, Egypt accepted UN Security Council Resolution 242, which, according to data scientist Anne Alexander, also implied acceptance of Israel’s right to exist. At the same time, Nasser urged Yasser Arafat and other Palestinian leaders to reject the resolution. "You must be our irresponsible arm," he said. King Hussein of Jordan also acknowledged that Israel had a right to exist at this time. Meanwhile, Syria rejected Resolution 242, saying that it, "refers to Israel's right to exist and it ignores the right of the [Palestinian] refugees to return to their homes."

Upon assuming the premiership in 1977, Menachem Begin spoke as follows: "Our right to exist—have you ever heard of such a thing? Would it enter the mind of any Briton or Frenchman, Belgian or Dutchman, Hungarian or Bulgarian, Russian or American, to request for its people recognition of its right to exist? ... Mr. Speaker: From the Knesset of Israel, I say to the world, our very existence per se is our right to exist!"

As reported by The New York Times, in 1988 Yasser Arafat pledged that the PLO would strive for a comprehensive settlement based on UN Security Council Resolutions 242 and 338, and that such a settlement would guarantee "the right to exist in peace and security for all". In June 2009, US president Barack Obama said "Israelis must acknowledge that just as Israel's right to exist cannot be denied, neither can Palestine's."

State of Israel Countries that recognize Israel Countries that have withdrawn their recognition of Israel Countries that have suspended/cut bilateral ties with Israel Countries that have never recognized Israel

State of Palestine Countries that have recognised the State of Palestine Countries that have not recognised the State of Palestine

In 1993, there was an official exchange of letters between Israeli Prime Minister Yitzhak Rabin and chairman Arafat, in which Arafat declared that "the PLO affirms that those articles of the Palestinian Covenant which deny Israel's right to exist, and the provisions of the Covenant which are inconsistent with the commitments of this letter are now inoperative and no longer valid."

In 2009 Prime Minister Ehud Olmert demanded, as preconditions for further negotiations, the Palestinian Authority's acceptance of Israel's right to exist as a Jewish state, which the Palestinian Authority rejected. The Knesset plenum gave initial approval in May 2009 to a bill criminalizing the public denial of Israel's right to exist as a Jewish state, with a penalty of up to a year in prison. In 2011 Palestinian President Mahmoud Abbas said in a speech to the Dutch Parliament that the Palestinian people recognize Israel's right to exist and they hope the Israeli government will respond by "recognizing the Palestinian state on the borders of the land occupied in 1967."

Israeli government ministers Naftali Bennett and Danny Danon have repeatedly rejected the creation of a Palestinian state, with Bennett stating "I will do everything in my power to make sure they never get a state." In June 2016 a poll showed that only 4 out of 20 Israeli ministers accepted the state of Palestine's right to exist.

John V. Whitbeck argued that recognition of Israel's right to exist by Hamas and Palestinians is "unreasonable, immoral, and impossible to meet", since it entails acceptance of the current status quo. Noam Chomsky has argued that no state has the right to exist, that the concept was invented in the 1970s, and that Israel's right to exist cannot be accepted by the Palestinians.

International law scholar Anthony Carty said in 2013 that "the question whether Israel has a legal right to exist might appear to be one of the most emotively charged in the vocabulary of international law and politics. It evokes immediately the 'exterminationist' rhetoric of numerous Arab and Islamic politicians and ideologues, not least the present President of Iran." (referring to then president Mahmoud Ahmadinejad)

=== Kurdistan ===
Representatives of the Kurdish people regularly assert their right to exist as a state.

=== Northern Ireland ===
The 1937 Constitution of Ireland originally claimed the national territory consisted of the whole of the island in Articles 2 and 3, denying Northern Ireland's right to exist. These articles were changed such that the previous claim over the whole island of Ireland became instead an aspiration towards creating a united Ireland by peaceful means, "with the consent of a majority of the people, democratically expressed, in both jurisdictions in the island" as part of the Good Friday Agreement ending The Troubles, a violent conflict between Irish nationalists and Ulster unionists from 1969 to 1998. The Good Friday signatories "recognise the legitimacy of whatever choice is freely exercised by a majority of the people of Northern Ireland with regard to its status, whether they prefer to continue to support the Union with Great Britain or a sovereign united Ireland."

=== North Korea ===
In the context of South Korea's and the United States non-recognition of the North Korean state and what the North views as a 'hostile policy' pursued by the United States, the North's government frequently accuses the United States of denying the 'right of existence' of North Korea. For instance, a 2017 Foreign Ministry statement declared, "The DPRK will redouble the efforts to increase its strength to safeguard the country's sovereignty and right to existence."

=== Ukraine ===
During the Russo-Ukrainian War, Russian government officials have denied Ukraine's right to exist. A few months before the 2022 Russian invasion of Ukraine, Russian president Vladimir Putin published an essay "On the Historical Unity of Russians and Ukrainians", in which he claimed there is "no historical basis" for the "idea of Ukrainian people as a nation separate from the Russians". RBK Daily wrote in 2021 that the essay was required reading for the Russian military. Former president Petro Poroshenko compared the essay to Hitler's Sudetenland speech. Thirty-five legal and genocide experts said the essay laid "the groundwork for incitement to genocide" by "denying the existence" of Ukrainians as a people. In 2024, Putin called Ukraine "an artificial state".

Dmitry Medvedev, deputy chairman of the Security Council of Russia and ex-President of Russia (2008-2012), commented that Putin outlined "why Ukraine did not exist, does not exist, and will not exist". He said in 2024 that Ukraine should not exist in any form and that Russia will continue to wage war against any independent Ukrainian state.

== Citations ==
- 1791 Thomas Paine, Rights of Man: "The fact therefore must be that the individuals themselves, each in his own personal and sovereign right, entered into a contract with each other to produce a government: and this is the only mode in which governments have a right to arise, and the only principle on which they have a right to exist."
- 1823 Sir Walter Scott: "Admitting, however, this right to exist in the Greek people, it is a different question whether there is any right, much more any call, for the nations of Europe to interfere in their support." (→ Greek War of Independence)
- 1882 Ernest Renan, "What Is a Nation?": So long as this moral consciousness gives proof of its strength by the sacrifices which demand the abdication of the individual to the advantage of the community, it is legitimate and has the right to exist [French: le droit d'exister].
- 1916 American Institute of International Law: "Every nation has the right to exist, and to protect and to conserve its existence."
- In November 1933, ten month after the Machtergreifung, the Nazi regime checked if people had voted on a referendum about withdrawal from the League of Nations. The regime pretended they would do this because the German Reich's right to exist was "a question of to be or not to be."

== See also ==
- Diplomatic recognition – Acknowledgement of one state for another
- Legitimacy – Right and acceptance of an authority
- List of former sovereign states
- Nation state – Political term for a state that is based around a nation
- Nationalism – Ideology promoting the nation-state
- Self-defence – Countermeasure to defend oneself against harm
- Self-determination – Right to participate in one's own governance
- Sovereign state – State having the highest authority over a territory
- Sovereignty – Supreme authority within a territory
- Special Committee on Decolonization
- Territorial integrity – Principle of international law
