= Addresses to the German Nation =

1808 work by Johann Gottlieb Fichte

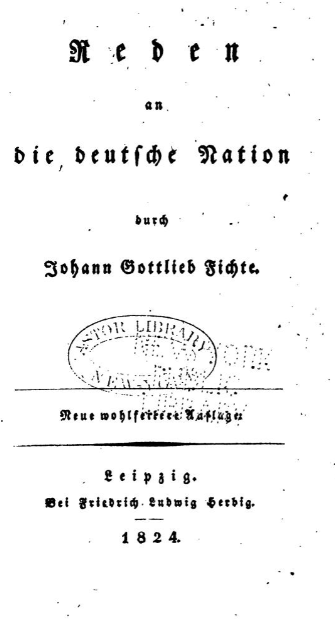
- Title page for Reden an die deutsche Nation (1824)
- Original title: Reden an die deutsche Nation
- Language: German
- Subject: Political philosophy
- Publication date: 1808
- Text: Addresses to the German Nation at Internet Archive

The Addresses to the German Nation (German: Reden an die deutsche Nation, 1808) is a political philosophy book by German philosopher Johann Gottlieb Fichte that advocates German nationalism in reaction to the occupation and subjugation of German territories by Napoleon's French Empire following the Battle of Jena.

== Overview ==
Fichte delivered the addresses in the circular hall of the Prussian Academy of Sciences in Berlin during the winter of 1807–08.

In the work, Fichte emphasised the distinctiveness of German language, traditions, and literature as defining elements of German national identity.

According to Bertrand Russell in his History of Western Philosophy, Fichte's work laid the theoretical foundations of German nationalism.

== See also ==
- Napoleonic Wars
- Unification of Germany
- "What Is a Nation?"

== Bibliography ==
- James, David (2011). Fichte's Social and Political Philosophy: Property and Virtue. Cambridge, England, UK: Cambridge University Press. ISBN 978-1-107-00155-8.
- Jusdanis, Gregory (2001). The Necessary Nation. Princeton, New Jersey, USA: Princeton University Press. ISBN 0-691-08902-7.
