= Arthur-Marie Le Hir =

French Biblical scholar and Orientalist

Arthur-Marie Le Hir (French: [lə iʁ]; Morlaix, 5 December 1811 – Paris, 13 January 1868) was a French Biblical scholar and Orientalist.

== Life ==
Entering the seminary of Saint-Sulpice, Paris, in 1833, he joined the Sulpicians after ordination. He studied Hebrew and biblical scholarship under Antoine Garnier (1762–1845), a scholar, according to Ernest Renan, "who had an excellent knowledge of languages and the complete knowledge of exegesis of any Catholic in France".

Le Hir was made professor of Sacred Scripture and Hebrew. He was then appointed professor of theology. He continued in that teaching post until his death about 30 years later. Through his work and that of his pupil, Renan, he influenced the revival of Biblical and Oriental studies in France. Renan regarded him as the best Hebrew and Syriac scholar of France of his generation and thoroughly versed in Biblical science, including the current German works, whose theories he combatted.

Renan's heterodoxy has been attributed to Le Hir. Renan judged that he "was certainly the most remarkable man in the French clergy of our day" (op. cit., 273). Robert Irwin stated that Renan said his grasp of Arabic was so poor due to inadequate instruction from his teachers.

== Works ==
Le Hir published only a few articles, which, along with others, were collected after his death in the two volumes entitled "Etudes Bibliques," Paris, 1869. That work shows him at his best in the range and solidity of his acquirements and the breadth of his views. His other writings, all posthumous and not left by him ready for the press, are studies in the translation and exegesis of certain Biblical works: "Le Livre de Job" (Paris, 1873); "Les Psaumes" (Paris, 1876); "Les Trois Grands Prophètes Isaie Jérémie, Ezéchiel" (Paris, 1876); "Le Cantique des Cantiques" (Paris, 1888).
