= Henriette Renan =

French writer (1811–1861)

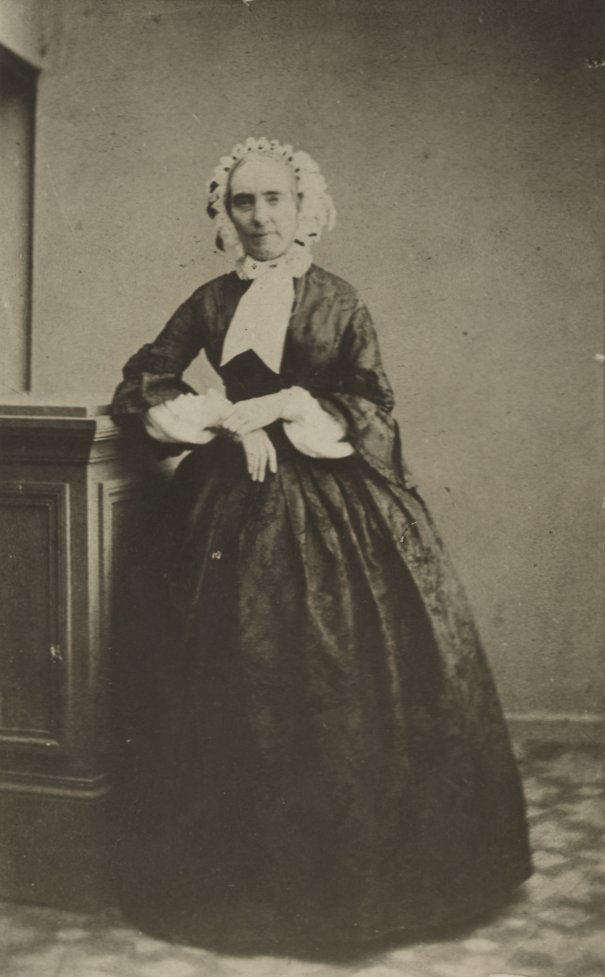
- Renan in 1857
- Born: Noémie Cornélie Henriette Renan; July 22, 1811; Tréguier, Brittany, France
- Died: September 24, 1861 (aged 50); Amsheet, Lebanon
- Burial place: Amsheet, Lebanon
- Other names: Henrietta Renan; Emma du Guindy
- Occupation: Writer
- Family: Ernest Renan

Henriette Renan (French: [ʁənɑ̃]; 22 July 1811 – 24 September 1861) was a French writer.

== Biography ==
Renan was born into a fishing family in Tréguier, Brittany, France where she lived in the large house bought by her grandfather. Her father was captain of a small cutter and a staunch Republican. Her mother was only half-Breton since her paternal ancestors hailed from Bordeaux. Her mother's father was a royalist tradesman from the neighbouring town of Lannion. Renan was 17 years old when her father died and she became the head of the household, in particular, taking responsibility for her 5-year-old brother Ernest Renan (he would later become a well known philosopher).

After failing to open a girls' school in Tréguier, Renan moved to Paris to teach, where she met Sophie Ulliac. She became tutor to a Polish family with whom she toured Europe. She later moved to Vienna as tutor for Count Zamoyski.

Renan wrote for Le Journal des jeunes personnes (edited by Sophie Ulliac between 1846 and 1857) and other periodicals under pseudonyms including Emma du Guindy. Since she had become financially independent, she was able to support her mother, pay for her brother's education, and pay off her father's debts. Renan had a great influence on her brother, acting as mother, sister, confidante and adviser.

== Works ==
Renan was more than a secretary for the works on art history conducted by her brother. Ernest Renan relied on her research and on her numerous re-reviews and critiques of his own writings.

== Death ==
In 1860, Henriette joined Ernest and his wife Cornélie in Lebanon while Ernest conducted archaeological investigations in both Lebanon and Syria. They stayed in the home of Zakhia Chalhoub el-Kallab and his son Abdallah Zakhia el Kallab, a notable Maronite family in the Amsheet region of Byblos, whose ancestors had been ennobled by an Ottoman Sultan and who had founded the first hospital in Lebanon, Saint-Michel d'Amchit. Already in poor health, Renan died of malaria in Amsheet on 24 September 1861. She is buried in the vault of Mikhaël Bek Tobia al-Kallab in Amsheet near the church of Notre-Dame.

== Bibliography ==
Nouvelles lettres intimes 1846-1850

=== Works by Henriette Renan ===
- Souvenirs et Impressions, Pologne, Rome, Allemagne, voyage en Syrie, edited by Henri Moncel with an introduction by Mary Duclaux (1930)
- Correspondance intime, 1842-1845
- Nouvelles lettres intimes, 1846-1850 (1923)

=== Works about Henriette Renan ===
- Renan, Ernest (1862). Henriette Renan, pour ceux qui l'ont connus (in French). p. 77.
- Renan, Ernest (1895). Ma soeur Henriette (in French).
- Le Goffic, Charles (1902). "Une déracinée : Henriette Renan". L'Âme Bretonne. 1 (in French).
- Barrès, Maurice (1923). Une enquête aux pays du Levant. Volume 1: Alexandrie, Beyrouth, le Liban, le tombeau d'Henriette Renan, une soirée avec les bacchantes (in French). Vol. 1. Plon-Nourrit.
- Giraud, Victor (1925). "Henriette Renan". Revue des Deux-mondes (in French).
- Giraud, Victor (1926). Sœurs de grands hommes : Jacqueline Pascal, Lucile de Chateaubriand, Henriette Renan (in French). G. Crès. p. 216.
- Cigoj-Leben, Breda (1971). Ernest Renan et sa soeur Henriette : contribution à une meilleure intelligence de la personnalité morale de Renan (in French). p. 102.
- Stankovitch, Eva. Henriette Renan, d'enseignante à éducatrice, journaliste et écrivain. Thèse de doctorat (1996)
