= Yves Hernot =

French sculptor

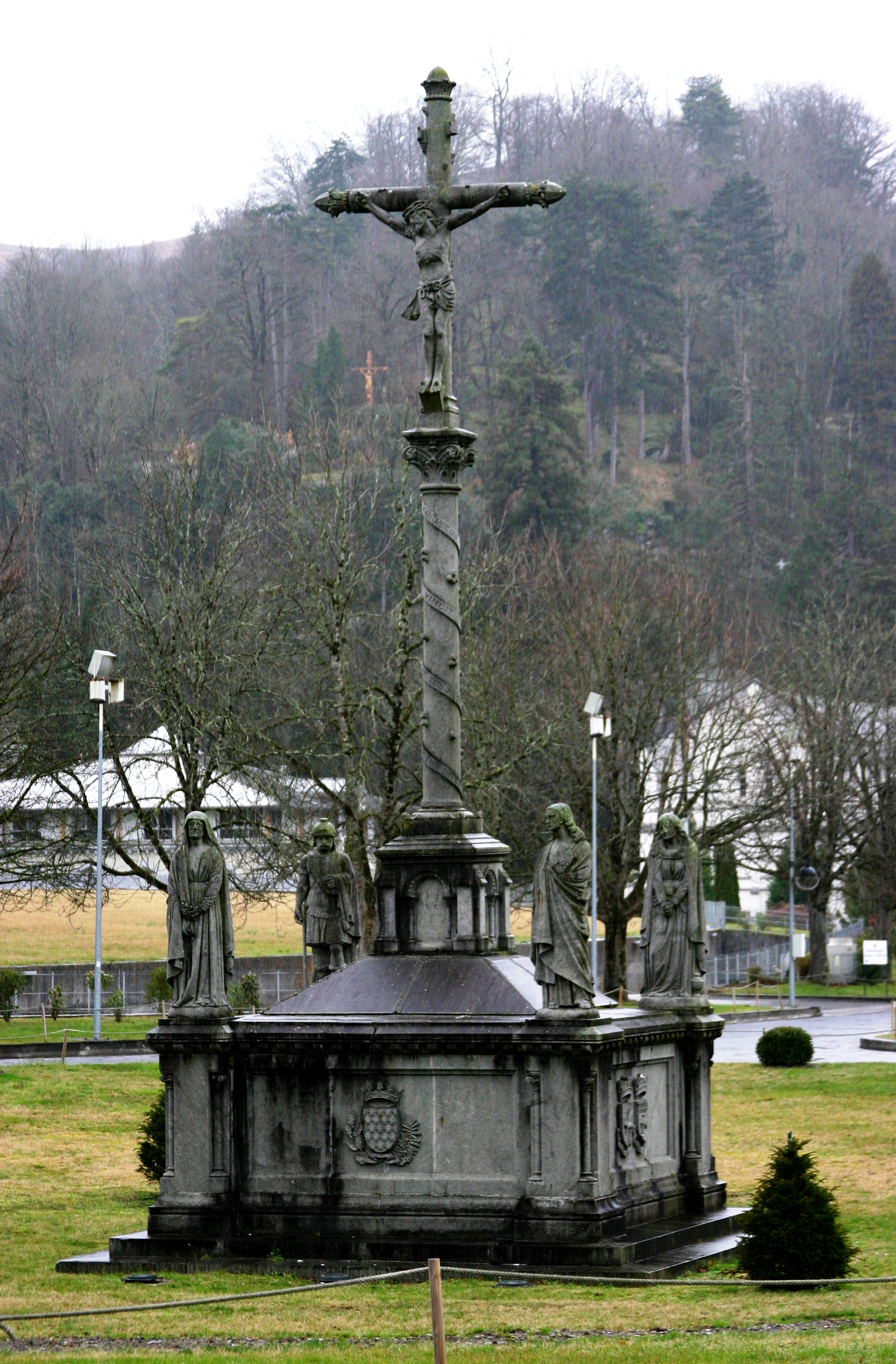
The Breton Calvary at Lourdes, created by the Ateliers Yves Hernot.

Yves Hernot (French: [iv ɛʁno]) is the name of two sculptors, father and son, who ran the Ateliers Yves Hernot sculpture workshop in Lannion, Brittany, which specialised in creating Calvaries and tombs.

== Hernot senior ==
Yves Hernot senior (1829 - 1890) established himself in Lannion in 1844. The son of a stonemason, he was given the opportunity to study art, but preferred to work on traditional monumental masonry. However, he won the Grand Prix de Rome for Sculpture, and showed his works at the 1867 World Fair. His work was generally associated with the church. A devout Catholic and conservative Royalist, during his lifetime 517 Calvaries were created by his workshop. He also created several tombs, including that of the last bishop of Treguier, whose body was returned to Brittany half a century after he had died in exile after the Revolution.

Hernot also wrote many songs in the Breton language, which he printed and distributed. One contrasts a Catholic and an atheist, another warns against the presence of Protestants. Others express anti-republican views, such as Ar gaouiad Republik (The Deceptive Republic). These political songs were often signed "Ur c'hoz masouner" (An old mason).

== Hernot junior ==
Yves Hernot junior (1861 - 1929) inherited his father's business after the latter's death in 1890. By this time the workshop employed over 80 workers. Under Yves junior the company created 440 more Calvaries, of which the most important were the Calvary of Protest in Tréguier and the Breton Calvary in Lourdes.

The Breton Calvary was created in 1900 as a gift to Lourdes from the main Breton dioceses: Rennes, Vannes, Quimper and Saint-Brieuc. The monument comprises a single central cross set within a raised square base at each corner of which a statue of one of the witnesses to the crucifixion is placed.

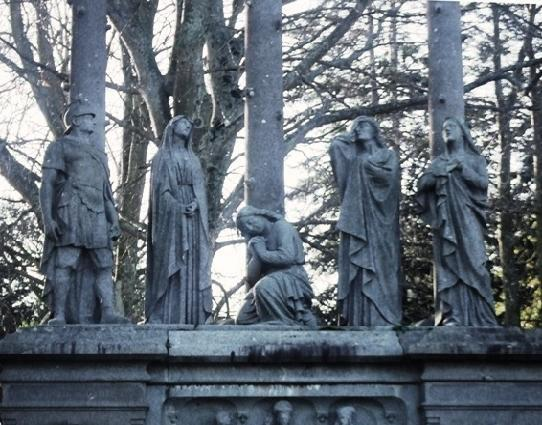
The Calvary of Protest (detail)

The Calvary of Protest (1904) was Yves junior's most ambitious work. It was intended as a "symbol of the ultramontane church triumphing over the 19th century", as a response to the recent monument to the religious sceptic Ernest Renan, created nearby, and the proposed law separating church and state instituted by the radicals of the Third Republic. The monument includes the inscribed phrase "Truly this man was the Son of God" in the Latin, French and Breton languages below the main scene of lamenting figures at the foot of the cross. Beneath is a relief depicting Saint Yves between a rich and poor man, along with statues of Saint Tugdual, founder of Tréguier, and Saint Brieuc, after whom the chief town in the region is named. It is surrounded by statues of saints representing "spiritual combat": Saint Maurice, Saint George, Joan of Arc and Saint Louis. They are flanked by Saint Peter and Saint Andrew.

Hernot also created freestanding secular works, notably his statue of French naval hero Abraham Duquesne in Concarneau.

After World War I the business created a large number of war memorials, including those of Lannion and Plestin-les-Grèves, both carved by Yves junior's son Léon Hernot (1894-1971). The latter was inaugurated in December 1923.

Léon took over after his father's death, but the business ceased trading in 1932.
