= What Is a Nation? =

1882 lecture by French historian Ernest Renan

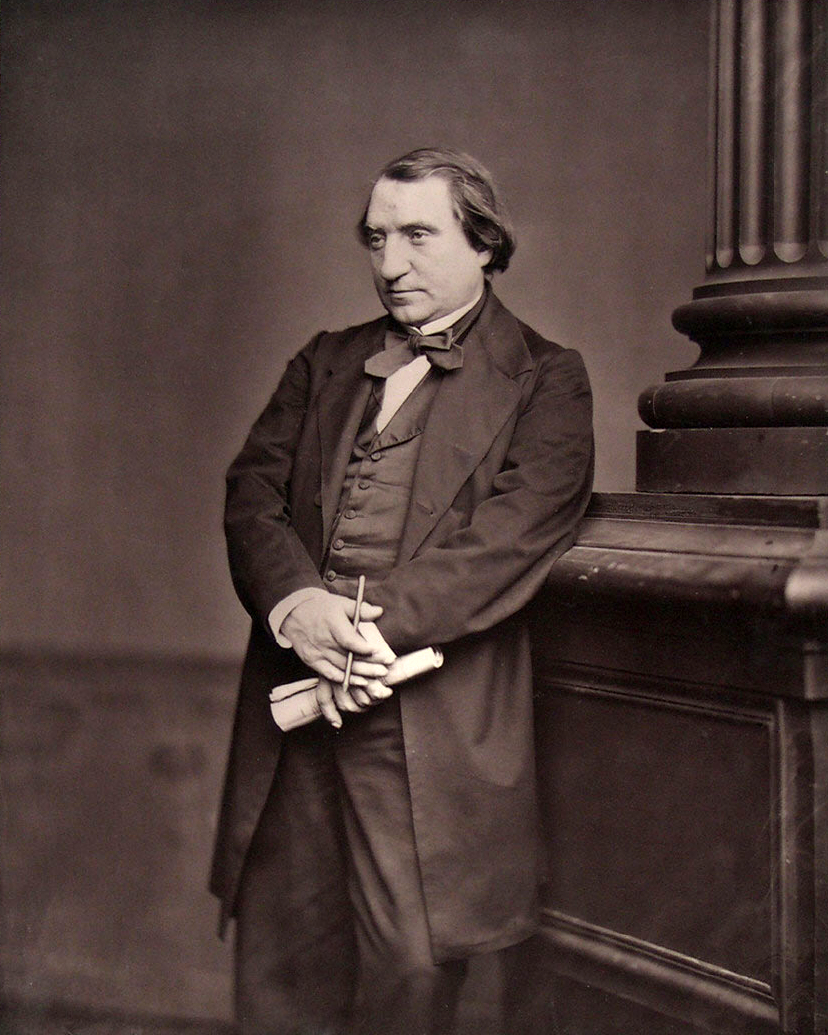
Portrait photograph of Ernest Renan

"What Is a Nation?" (French: Qu'est-ce qu'une nation ?) is an 1882 lecture by French historian Ernest Renan (1823–1892) at the Sorbonne, known for the statements that a nation is "a daily plebiscite", and that nations are based as much on what people jointly forget as on what they remember. It is frequently quoted or anthologized in works of history or political science pertaining to nationalism and national identity. It exemplifies a social constructivist understanding of the nation.

== Nationhood in Renan's time ==
Renan begins his essay by noting that there is frequent confusion between the idea of nationhood and of racial or linguistic groupings, a form of confusion which he says can produce "the gravest errors". He promises to conduct an autopsy-like examination, "in an absolutely cold and impartial fashion".

He claims that nations existing at the time of writing in 1882, such as France, Germany, the United Kingdom, and Russia, will continue to exist for hundreds of years, and that any nation trying to dominate them will be quickly pushed back to its own borders, by a coalition of other nations; "The establishment of a new Roman or Charlemagnian Empire has become an impossibility."

Renan believes that nations developed from the common needs of the people, who consisted of different social groups seeking a "collective identity". He praises the eighteenth century for its achievements related to humanity and the restoration of the pure identity of man, one which was free from misconceptions and socially established variances. Renan discredits the theory that race is the basis for the unification of people. France was ethnically diverse during the French Revolution and the rule of Napoleon, but it nevertheless managed to set the stage for nationalism. Renan also asserts that neither language nor religion are basis for solidarity because language "invites people to unite, but does not force them to do so" and "religion has become an individual matter". For example, the United States and the United Kingdom both speak English but do not constitute a single, united nation and countries no longer operate on the notion of religions operating against each other, forcing people to choose between one or the other.

Renan believed that a unique element of the European nation-forming experience was the mixture of races, origins and religions, where conquering people often adopted the religion and manners, and married the women, of the people they conquered. For example, "at the end of one or two generations, the Norman invaders were indistinguishable from the rest of the population". Nonetheless, they had a profound influence, bringing with them "a nobility of military habit, a patriotism" which did not exist in England before.

== Forgetfulness ==
Renan then states what has become one of the most famous and enduring ideas of the essay: "Forgetfulness, and I would even say historical error, are essential in the creation of a nation." Historical research, by revealing unwanted truths, can even endanger nationhood. All nations, even the most benevolent in later practice, are founded on acts of violence, which are then forgotten. "Unity is always achieved by brutality: the joining of the north of France with the south was the result of nearly a century of extermination and terror". He believes that people unite in their memories of suffering because alleviating grief requires a "common effort" which serves as a foundation for unity. Members of a community feel as though they have accomplished something great when they are able to survive in adverse conditions. He gives some examples of countries like Turkey and Bohemia where there is rigid stratification, or where different communities are played off against one another, and where the homogenization of different groups could not take place, resulting in a failure of nationhood. This leads to one of the most frequently quoted statements in the essay:

Yet the essence of a nation is that all individuals have many things in common, and also that they have forgotten many things. No French citizen knows whether he is a Burgundian, an Alan, a Taifale, or a Visigoth, yet every French citizen has to have forgotten the massacre of Saint Bartholomew, or the massacre that took place in the south in the thirteenth century.

== Falsely assumed foundations of nationhood ==
Renan presents and attacks the factors that are generally viewed as providing the basis for nationhood. He begins with race, which fails for nations such as France, as it is "Celt, Iberian, German... The most noble countries, England, France and Italy, are the ones where the blood is most mixed." According to Renan, "[T]here is no such thing as a pure race and that to found politics on ethnographic analysis is to base it on a chimera." He contended that race was "something that is made and unmade."

He next attacks language as the basis for national unity, as it "invites us but does not force us, [sic] to unite". Many countries, such as Switzerland, are home to speakers of any number of languages, while many nations that share a common language are nonetheless distinct. Nor is modern nationhood founded on religion, which, Renan observes, is currently practiced according to individual belief. "You can be French, English, German, yet Catholic, Protestant, Jewish, or practicing no religion". Geography and mutual interest similarly fail to define the nation, as nations often exist separated by tremendous social or geographical bounds: "Mountains don't know how to carve out countries". Upon concluding that these commonalities are insufficient in defining the nation, Renan comes to present nationhood in his own terms.

== A "spiritual principle" ==
Renan concludes that:

A nation is a soul, a spiritual principle. Two things which, properly speaking, are really one and the same constitute this soul, this spiritual principle. One is the past, the other is the present. One is the possession in common of a rich legacy of memories; the other is present consent, the desire to live together, the desire to continue to invest in the heritage that we have jointly received. Messieurs, man does not improvise. The nation, like the individual, is the outcome of a long past of efforts, sacrifices, and devotions. Of all cults, that of the ancestors is the most legitimate: our ancestors have made us what we are. A heroic past with great men and glory (I mean true glory) is the social capital upon which the national idea rests. These are the essential conditions of being a people: having common glories in the past and a will to continue them in the present; having made great things together and wishing to make them again. One loves in proportion to the sacrifices that one has committed and the troubles that one has suffered. One loves the house that one has built and that one passes on. The Spartan chant, "We are what you were; we will be what you are", is, in its simplicity, the abridged hymn of every fatherland.

Thus, national unity rests upon common memory of glories past and shared ambition for future achievement.

== Continued consent ==
A very important element of nationhood, says Renan, is the desire to continue forming part of the nation. Renan's second frequently quoted statement is:

The existence of a nation (you will pardon me this metaphor) is a daily plebiscite, (Note: un plébiscite de tous les jours.) just as the continuing existence of an individual is a perpetual affirmation of life.

This leads Renan to the conclusion that "A nation never has a veritable interest in annexing or keeping another region against the wishes of its people". In other words areas which wish to secede, such as states or provinces, should be permitted to do so. "If doubts arise about national borders, consult the population of the area in dispute. They have the right to an opinion on the issue."

According to Renan, "Nations are not eternal. They were begun, and they will end." "A European confederation will probably replace the nations of today." At the current time, however, the existence of separate nations serves to guarantee liberty, in a way which would be lost if the whole world served under one law and one master. "Each brings one note to the great concert of humanity..." (Note: toutes apportent une note à ce grand concert de l'humanité, qui, en somme, est la plus haute réalité idéale que nous atteignions (… which ultimately is the highest ideal reality we can attain).)

Renan gives Switzerland as a prime example of a nation established by volition (choice, will):

Switzerland, so well made, since it was made with the consent of her different parts, numbers three or four languages. There is something in man which is superior to language, namely, the will.

Renan's argument was summarized in the German term Willensnation ("nation-by-volition"), (Note: A related concept of a nation formed by an act of will (Willensentschluss) was proposed by Johann Gottlieb Fichte prior to Renan, in the context of the project of German unification. Fichte used the term in a different spirit, and its application to the ideal of Renan as exemplified in the Swiss Confederacy dates to the early 20th century. See Andrea Albrecht, Kosmopolitismus: Weltbürgerdiskurse in Literatur, Philosophie und Publizistik um 1800, Walter de Gruyter, 2005, p. 350; Felicity Rash, German Images of the Self and the Other: Nationalist, Colonialist and Anti-Semitic Discourse 1871-1918, Palgrave Macmillan, 2012, p. 35.) used to describe the status of Switzerland as a federal state by choice, and not along ethnic boundaries. The term became popular to describe the Swiss political model after World War I and continues to be invoked.

== Legacy and criticism ==
Jewish political historian Karl Deutsch, in a quote sometimes mistakenly attributed to Renan, said that a nation is "a group of people united by a mistaken view about the past and a hatred of their neighbours".

Benedict Anderson's 1983 work Imagined Communities, which states that a nation is an "imagined political community", argues that Renan contradicts himself when he says French people must have forgotten the St. Bartholomew's Day massacre, yet does not explain what it is. In other words, Renan assumes that all his readers will remember the very massacre he says they have forgotten. Anderson also points out that the reason many French citizens of Renan's time knew anything of these massacres was because they learned of them in state-run schools. Thus, the state itself preserved the knowledge which needed to be forgotten for national identity.

In a 1995 book, For Love of Country: An Essay on Patriotism and Nationalism, Princeton University political theorist Maurizio Viroli called Renan's essay "the most influential late nineteenth-century interpretation of the meaning of nation", because of its focus on the "spiritual principle" as opposed to race, religion or geography.

Other authors, like Joxe Azurmendi, consider that really there is no such opposition to the reasons based on race, geography, history and so on. He argues that Renan maintains his intellectual background but subtly, i.e. the arguments he explicitly used in What is a Nation? are not consistent with his thinking. The concept of "daily plebiscite" would be ambiguous. Azurmendi also argues that the definition is an opportunistic idealization and it should be interpreted within the context of the Franco-Prussian War and the dispute concerning the Alsace-Lorraine region.

== See also ==
- Addresses to the German Nation
