= Calvary (monument) =

Christian monument

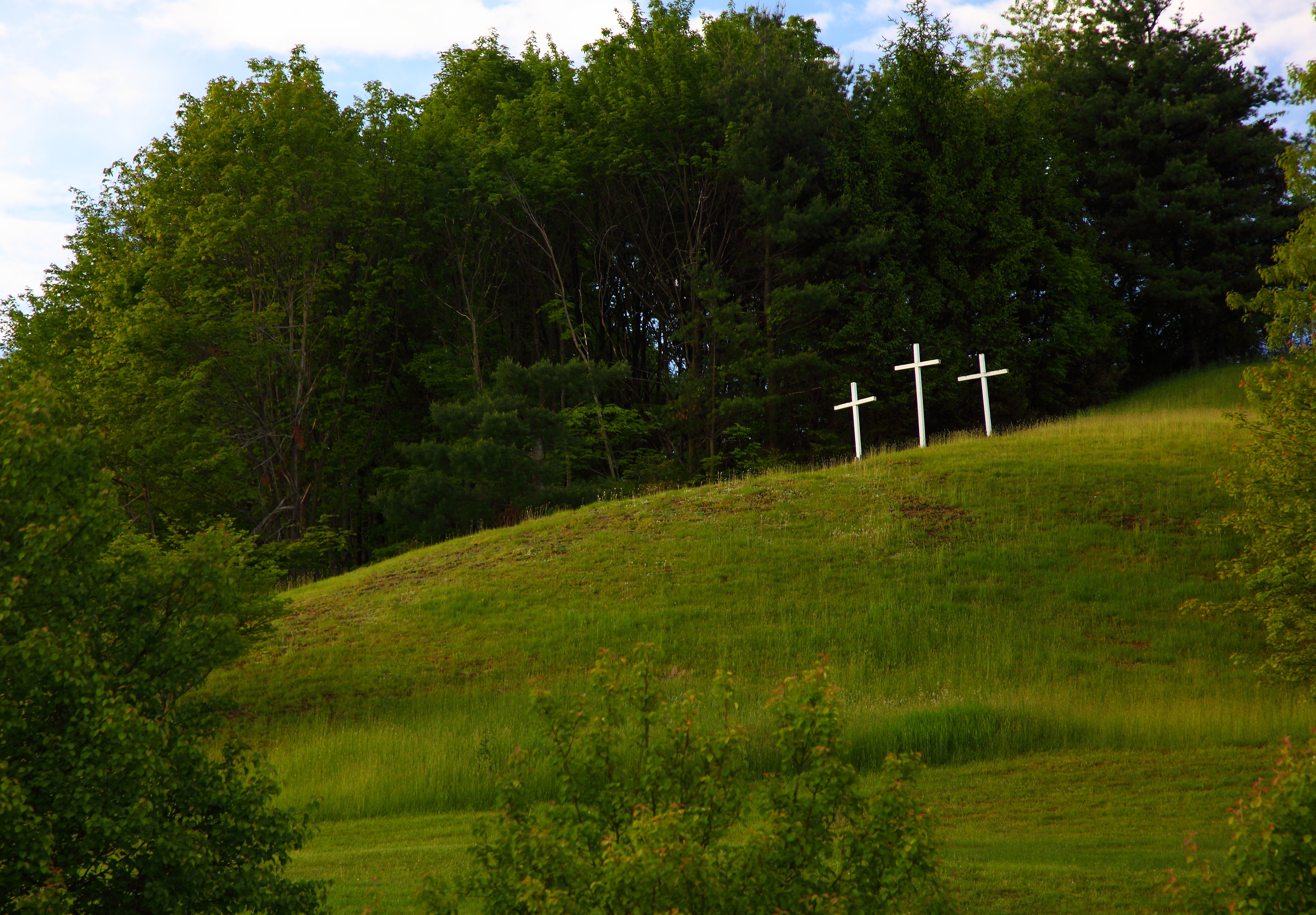
Calvary in West Virginia in the United States.

A calvary is a type of monumental public Christian cross, sometimes encased in an open shrine. Usually a calvary has three crosses, that of Jesus Christ and those of the impenitent thief and penitent thief.

== History ==
=== Calvaires in France ===
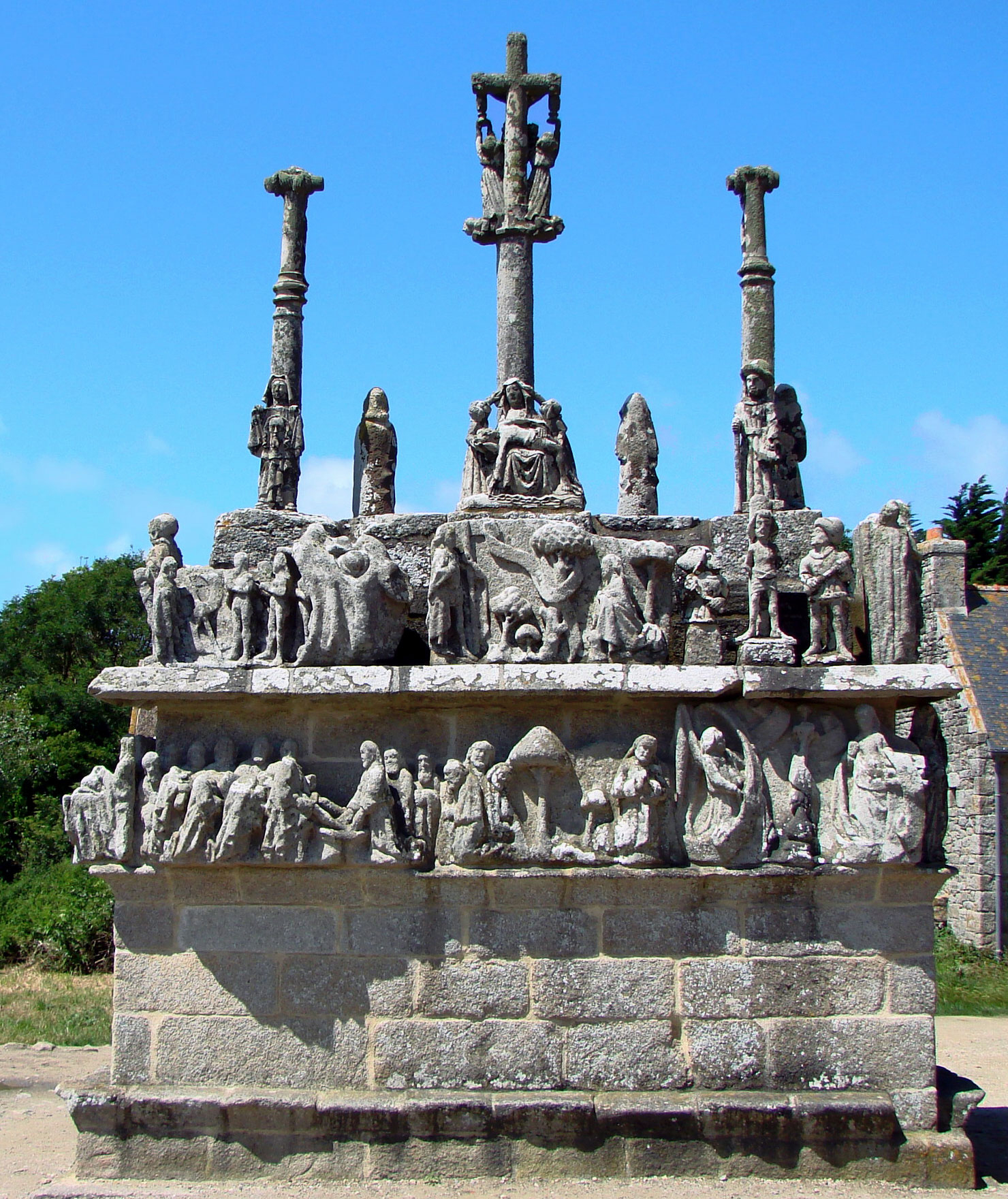
Tronoen Calvaire

The oldest surviving calvaire, dating to between 1450 and 1460, is in France at the Chapelle Notre-Dame-de-Tronoën in the town of Saint-Jean-Trolimon, in south Finistère, near the Pointe de la Torche. This is raised on a large base which also includes carved representations of the Last Supper and scenes from the passion. Calvaires played an important role in Breton pilgrimages known as Pardons, forming a focal point for public festivals. In some instances the Calvary forms part of an outdoor pulpit or throne.

Calvaires are to be found in large numbers throughout Brittany, and come in many varied forms. Breton calvaries typically include three-dimensional figures, usually representing the Virgin Mary, the apostles, and saints, attending the Crucifixion itself.

A 16th-century calvaire from Louargat, Brittany, transplanted to serve as a World War I memorial, stands at the Carrefour de la Rose near the Belgian town of Boezinge north of Ypres.

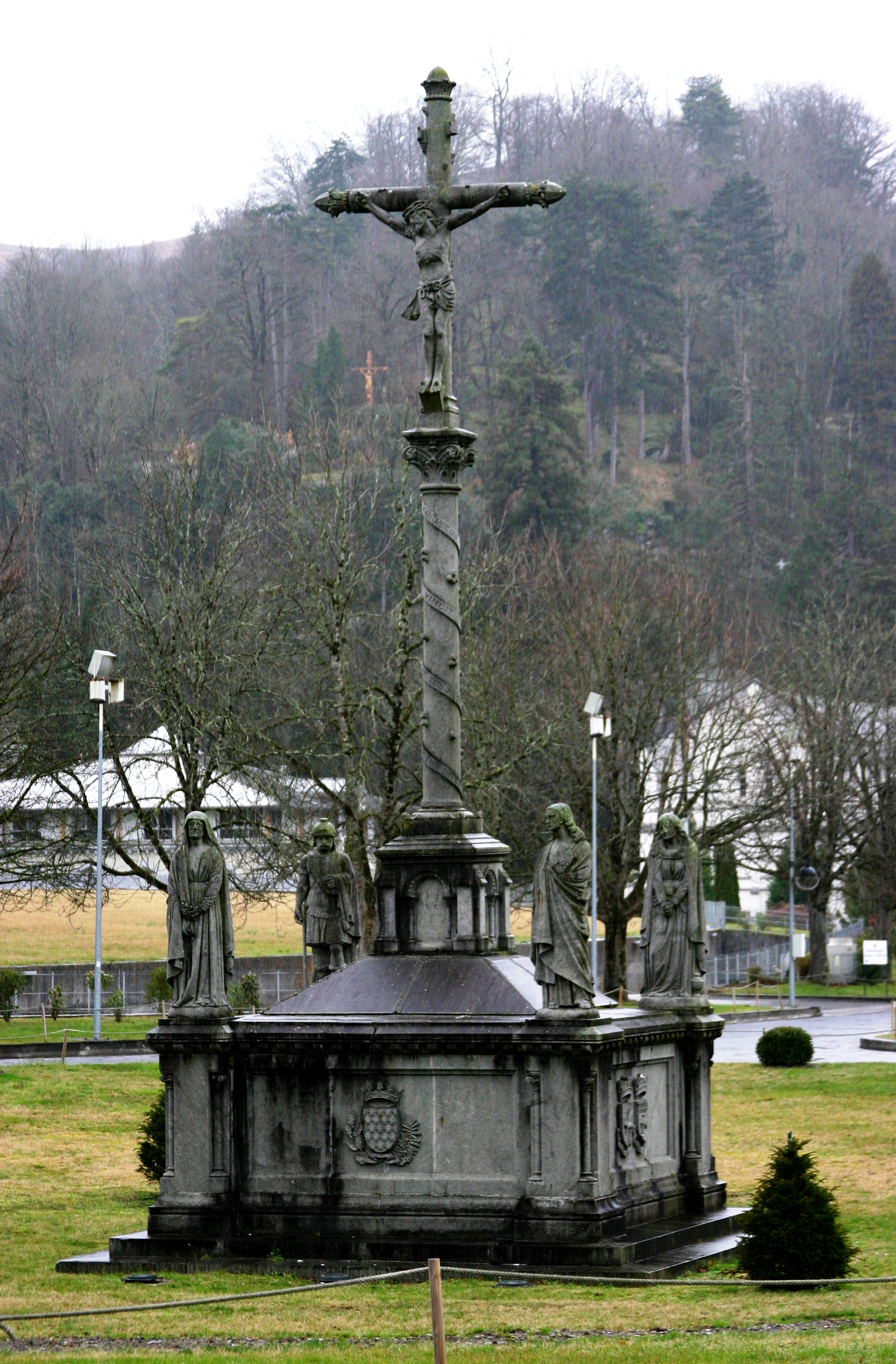
Calvary - Lourdes

The most notable Calvary monument outside Brittany is at Lourdes. This was specifically intended to represent Breton Catholicism. It was created by the sculptor Yves Hernot in 1900 as a gift to Lourdes from the main Breton dioceses: Rennes, Vannes, Quimper and Saint-Brieuc. The monument comprises a single central cross set within a raised square base at each corner of which a statue of one of the witnesses to the crucifixion is placed.

In northern France and Belgium, such wayside calvaries erected at the junction of routes and tracks "function both as navigation devices and objects of veneration", Nicholas J. Saunders has observed "Since medieval times they have fixed the landscape, symbolically acquiring it for the Christian faith, in the same way that, previously, Megalithic monuments marked prehistoric landscapes according to presumed religious and ideological imperatives".

=== Elsewhere ===
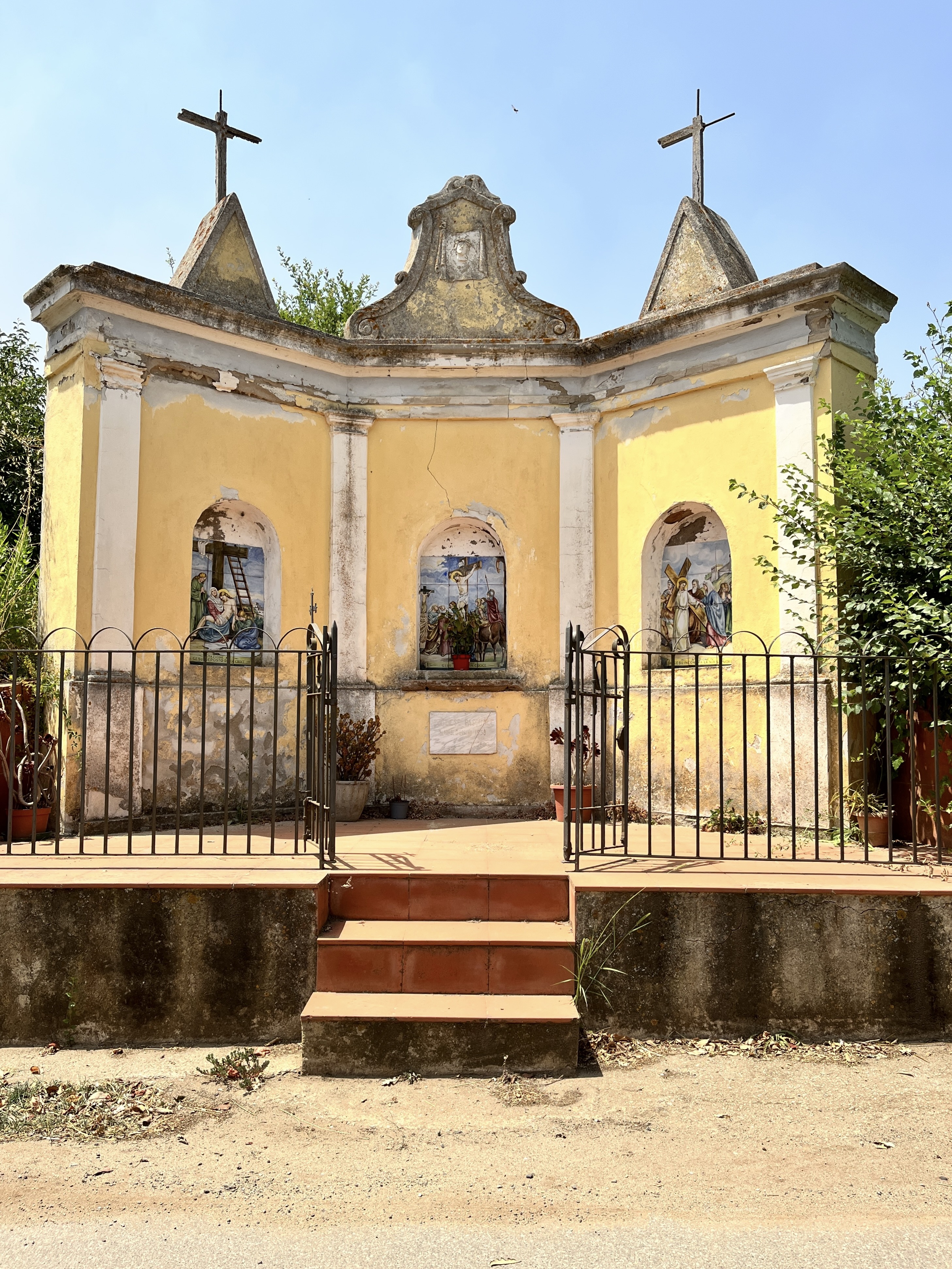
Calvary in Ricadi (VV), Calabria, Italy.

In Southern Italy calvaries are common. A typical variation is the Calabrian calvary, which includes 3 or more paintings of the Passion of Jesus on a wall surmounted by a cross and protected by a low fence.

== See also ==
- List of tallest crosses in the world
- Memorial cross
- Summit cross
- Wayside cross
- Mount of Olives group, a similar type of monument in Central Europe
