= Babelon =

Babelon is a surname. Notable people with this surname include:

- Ernest Babelon (1854–1924), French numismatist and classical archaeologist
- Jean Babelon (1889–1978), French librarian, historian, numismatist
- Jean-Pierre Babelon (1931–2024), French historian
