= Jacques-Antoine Dulaure =

French archaeologist and historian

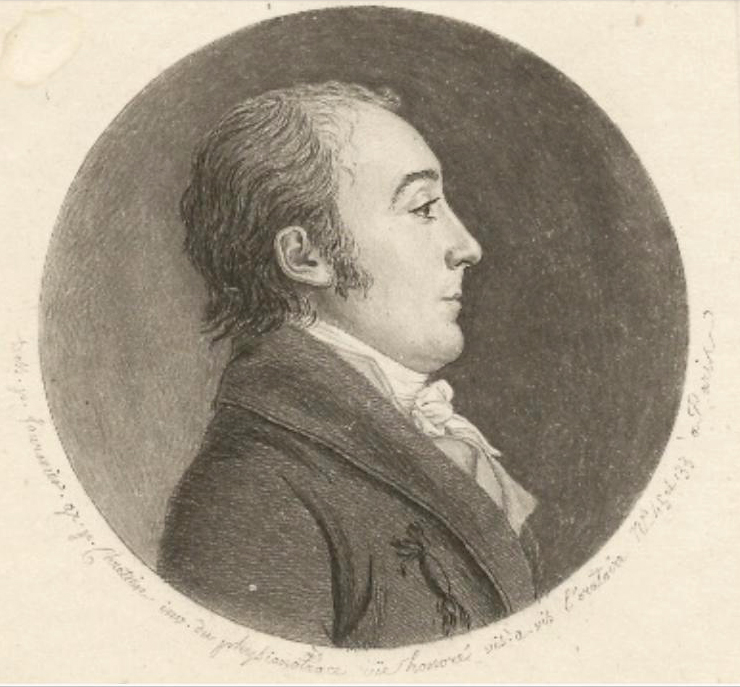
- Jacques-Antoine Dulaure, portrait drawn by Fournier and engraved by Gilles-Louis Chrétien.
- Born: December 3, 1755; Clermont-Ferrand, (Puy-de-Dôme)
- Died: August 18, 1835 (79 years); Former 11th arrondissement of Paris
- Citizenship: France
- Occupations: Politician, historian, archaeologist
- Title: Member of the Council of Five Hundred; Puy-de-Dôme
- Political party: Girondins

Signature
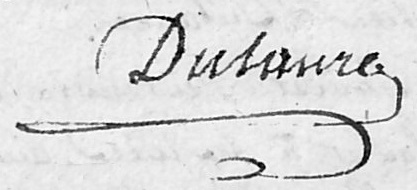

Notes
- Archives kept by Clermont Auvergne Métropole Heritage Library

Jacques-Antoine Dulaure (born December 3, 1755, in Clermont-Ferrand and died on August 18, 1835, in Paris) was a French archaeologist, historian, and politician, recognized for his contributions to geography, topography, and historical literature during the late 18th and early 19th centuries.

== Biography ==
Dulaure received his early education at the Collège de Clermont, where he studied drawing and mathematics. Before embarking on a literary and historical career, he pursued training in architecture and later topography. In October 1779, he moved to Paris and was accepted as a student under Jean-Baptiste Rondelet, the architect appointed to complete the Church of Sainte-Geneviève following the death of Jacques-Germain Soufflot. Rondelet's primary task involved reinforcing the pillars of the structure, which were believed to be insufficient to support the weight of the dome. During this period, while Dulaure was conducting vertical measurements inside the church—walking along the high cornices—he suffered from vertigo and nearly fell to his death. This incident left a lasting impression and led him to abandon the field of architecture. He subsequently turned to geographical engineering.

Dulaure was later employed as an assistant to a chief engineer in the planning of a proposed canal connecting Bordeaux and Bayonne. However, the project was ultimately abandoned due to disruptions caused by the American War of Independence. Shifting focus once more, Dulaure took up teaching geometry and developed a surveying instrument designed for creating precise plans and topographic maps. In 1781, he submitted his invention to the Académie des sciences, where it was favorably reviewed by Rossut and Cousin, both of whom issued positive assessments of its utility and innovation.

=== Literary beginnings ===
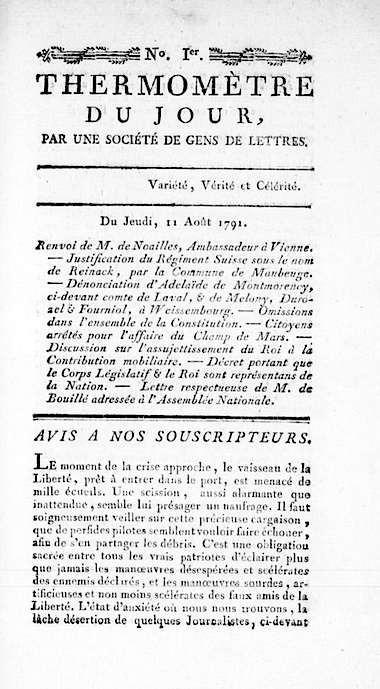
Le Thermomètre du jour, front page of issue No. 1 (August 11, 1791).

In 1782, Dulaure embarked on a literary career that would span over half a century. His earliest publications were critiques of contemporary Parisian monuments, most notably the newly constructed Odéon Theatre, built on the former site of the Hôtel de Condé. In one of his initial works, Dulaure employed a satirical device in which the building's boxes, decorations, and walls were made to engage in a fictional dialogue, thereby reasoning and critiquing themselves. In 1784, inspired by the first aerostatic experiments of the Montgolfier brothers, Dulaure published a whimsical short piece entitled Retour de voyage dans la Lune, a satirical account that anticipated similar works, including Beffroy de Reigny's journal Les Lunes, launched the following year.

Between 1785 and 1786, Dulaure appears to have been responsible for reviewing theatrical productions in Le Courrier lyrique et amusant, ou Passe-temps des toilettes by Dufrénoy, in which he also introduced archaeological content.

In 1786, Dulaure published an essay on pogonology (the study of beards), engaging in what would now be classified as a psycho-sociological reflection on the significance of facial hair. In the essay, he provocatively advocated for the return of the beard, countering the prevailing fashion of clean-shavenness in Enlightenment society.

Over the following years, Dulaure published several works critical of the institutions and ideological underpinnings of the Ancien Régime. became apparent. Among these were Description de Paris and Nouvelle Description des curiosités de Paris (both 1785), which offered guidance for travelers while simultaneously delivering pointed critiques of monarchical excess and ecclesiastical privilege. These were followed by Description de Paris et de ses environs and Singularités historiques (1786). His polemical tone attracted considerable criticism, notably in L'Année littéraire; Dulaure responded forcefully to his detractors with a published rebuttal.

In 1788–1789, he directed the publication of Description de la France par provinces, an ambitious six-volume geographical and historical survey. However, the outbreak of the French Revolution, which Dulaure ardently supported, interrupted the continuation of the project. Turning to revolutionary politics, Dulaure engaged in political journalism and pamphleteering. In 1790, he launched Les Évangélistes du jour, a short-lived satirical journal that produced 16 issues. Intended as a response to the royalist Les Actes des Apôtres, it was described by critics as an “ineffective catapult” in the polemical war of words. From August 11, 1791, to August 25, 1793, Dulaure published the political journal Le Thermomètre du jour, at times collaborating with Barthélemy Chaper (1766–1825). Initially printed by Langlois fils, the journal was later produced by Anne Félicité Colombe, a notable female printer and revolutionary figure.

== Deputy ==
=== National Convention ===
The constitutional monarchy established by the Constitution of September 3, 1791, ended with the events of August 10, 1792, when federates from Brittany and Marseille, together with insurgents from the Parisian suburbs, stormed the Tuileries Palace. As a result, King Louis XVI was deposed and imprisoned in the Temple.

In September 1792, Jacques-Antoine Dulaure was elected as the twelfth and final deputy for the Puy-de-Dôme department in the National Convention. He aligned himself with the Girondin faction, known for its moderate republicanism.

During the trial of Louis XVI, he voted for the king's execution, rejecting both an appeal to the people and a suspension of the sentence. On April 13, 1793, he was absent during the vote on the indictment of Jean-Paul Marat. On May 28, he voted in favor of restoring the Commission of Twelve. In the spring of 1793, he published an address to his constituents. On August 8, in a petition read to the convention, Simone Évrard, Marat's widow, denounced several Girondin deputies—among them Carra, Ducos, and Dulaure—labeling them “the most cowardly of all scribblers."

Starting in September 1793, Dulaure withdrew to the Sainte-Perrine monastery in Chaillot with his fellow Girondin Jean-Augustin Pénières (deputy for Corrèze). He was not included in the arrest decrees of May 31-June 2 or in the October 3 decree issued by Jean-Pierre-André Amar, rapporteur of the Committee of General Security. However, on October 21, 1793 (30 Vendémiaire, Year II), Amar ordered his indictment, claiming that "due to an unintentional error, he had not been included in the original decree." With the help of fellow outlawed Girondins Joseph Bonet de Treyches (deputy for Haute-Loire), Louis-Alexandre Devérité (deputy for Somme), and Étienne Joseph Ferroux (deputy for Jura), he fled to Switzerland.

In December 1794 (Frimaire, Year III), following a motion by his fellow Puy-de-Dôme deputy Jean-Baptiste-Benoît Monestier, Dulaure was reinstated in the National Convention alongside other deputies who had been arrested for signing the protest against the events of June 2. In April 1795 (Germinal, Year III), he was sent on a mission to the arms factories of Tulle and Bergerac to replace deputy Pierre Paganel (deputy for Lot-et-Garonne) but was recalled in July (Messidor).

=== Council of Five Hundred ===
Dulaure was re-elected as a deputy under the Directory by the departments of Corrèze, Dordogne, and Puy-de-Dôme, ultimately serving as the representative for Puy-de-Dôme in the Council of Five Hundred. He was selected by lot to continue his mandate until Prairial, Year V (May–June 1797). In Germinal, Year VI (March–April 1798), he was re-elected by Puy-de-Dôme for a third term. During his tenure in the council, Dulaure distinguished himself through his contributions to debates on public education.

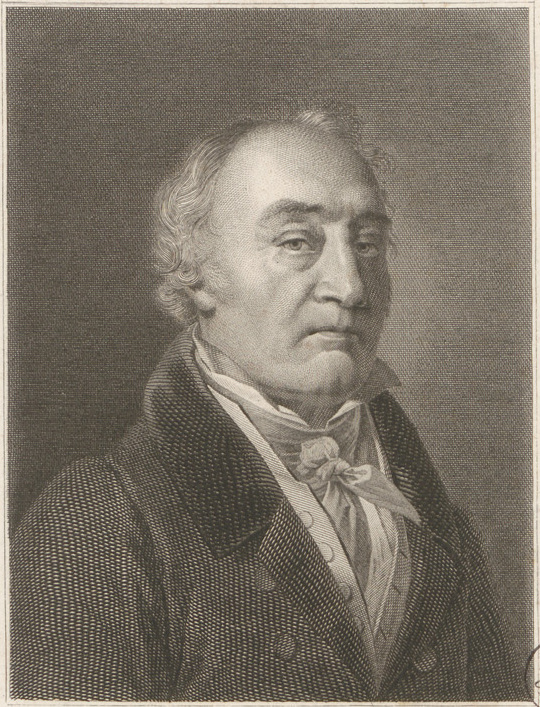
Portrait of Dulaure, 19th c.

== After the Coup of 18 Brumaire ==
Following the coup of 18 Brumaire (9 November 1799), Dulaure, who had reportedly exclaimed "Down with the dictator!", withdrew from political life and returned to private pursuits, dedicating himself to historical research. In 1808, he accepted a position as a sub-chief in a financial administration, a necessity prompted by the bankruptcy of a Parisian notary who had held his entire fortune.

In 1804, Dulaure collaborated with Jacques Cambry, François-Xavier de Mangourit, and Éloi Jouhanneau in founding the Académie Celtique, the predecessor of the Société des Antiquaires de France. He contributed to early ethnographic research by drafting the first known ethnographic questionnaire applied within France.

== Works ==
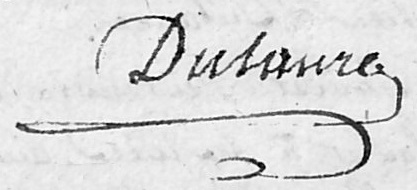
Signature of Jacques-Antoine Dulaure - National Archives

Dulaure authored numerous works focused on the history of Paris, the French nation, and the French Revolution. His most notable publication is Histoire civile, physique et morale de Paris, a comprehensive study notable for its inclusion of rare facts and original research. The work contains pointed critiques of royal and clerical abuses, which provoked opposition from defenders of the Ancien Régime. Among his other notable publications are:

- Pogonologie, ou histoire philosophique de la barbe (1786);
- Réclamation d’un Citoyen contre une nouvelle enceinte de Paris, élevée par les fermiers généraux (1787);
- Description des principaux lieux de France (1789);
- Histoire critique de la noblesse depuis le commencement de la monarchie jusqu'à nos jours (1790);
- Liste des noms des ci-devant nobles, nobles de race, robins, prélats, financiers, intrigants, et de tous les aspirants à la noblesse ou escrocs d'icelle, avec des notes sur leurs familles (1790);
- Vie privée des ecclésiastiques, prélats et autres fonctionnaires publics qui n'ont point prêté leur serment sur la Constitution civile du clergé (1791);
- Étrennes à la Noblesse: ou Précis historique et critique sur l'origine des ci-devant ducs, comtes, barons etc., monseigneurs et grandeurs, etc. (1791);
- Des Cultes qui ont précédé et amené l'idolâtrie: ou l'adoration des figures humaines (1805);
- Des Divinités génératrices: ou du culte du Phallus chez les anciens et les modernes, des cultes du dieu de Lampsaque, de Pan, de Vénus, etc. (1805);
- Causes secrètes des excès de la Révolution: ou Réunion de témoignages qui prouvent que la famille des Bourbons, les chefs de l'émigration, sont les instigateurs de la mort de Louis XVI, du régime de la Terreur et des maux qui ont désolé la France avant et pendant la session de la Convention (1815);
- Esquisses historiques des principaux événemens de la Révolution française, depuis la convocation des États-Généraux jusqu'au rétablissement de la maison de Bourbon (1823–1825);
- Histoire physique, civile et morale de Paris depuis les premiers temps historiques jusqu'à nos jours (1829);
- Histoire physique, civile et morale des environs de Paris, depuis les premiers temps historiques jusqu'à nos jours (1825–1828);
- Histoire de la révolution française, depuis 1814 jusqu'à 1830 (1838);
- Histoire de la Révolution de 1830 (1872).

== Bibliography ==
- Contandriopoulos, Christina (2020). "Cartographie anachronique. Le premier plan rétrospectif de Paris par Jacques-Antoine Dulaure en 1821" [Anachronistic cartography. The first retrospective map of Paris by Jacques-Antoine Dulaure in 1821]. Captures (in French). 5 (1). doi:10.7202/1073473ar.
- Déportations et exils des Conventionnels : actes du colloque de Bruxelles, 21-22 novembre 2016 [Deportations and Exiles of the Members of the Convention: proceedings of the Brussels conference, November 21–22, 2016]. Études révolutionnaires (in French). Paris. pp. 83–98.
- Reboisson, Aurélie (2011). "Jacques-Antoine Dulaure, journaliste et acteur girondin de la Révolution (1791-1793)" [Jacques-Antoine Dulaure, journalist and actor in the Gironde during the Revolution (1791-1793)]. La Révolution française au miroir des recherches actuelles : actes du colloque tenu à Ivry-sur-Seine, 15-16 juin 2010 [The French Revolution in the Mirror of Current Research: Proceedings of the Conference Held in Ivry-sur-Seine, June 15–16, 2010]. Collection des études révolutionnaires (in French). Paris: Société des études robespierristes. pp. 35–45. ISBN 978-2-908327-71-7.
- Reboisson, Aurélie (2004). Journalisme et politique chez Jacques-Antoine Dulaure (1791-1973) [Journalism and politics with Jacques-Antoine Dulaure (1791-1973)] (in French). Clermont-Ferrand: Université Clermont II.
- Robert; Cougny (1890). Dictionnaire des parlementaires français [Dictionary of French parliamentarians] (in French). Vol. 2. Paris: Bourloton. pp. 471–472.
- Boudet, Marcellin (1874). Les Conventionnels d'Auvergne. Dulaure [The Conventionnels d'Auvergne. Dulaure] (in French). Clermont-Ferrand.
- Ferdinand Hoefer, Jean Chrétien (1868). Nouvelle Biographie générale [New General Biography] (in French). Vol. XV. Paris: Firmin-Didot. pp. 126–127.
- de la Sicotière, L (1862). "Introduction". Mémoires de Dulaure (in French). Paris: Poulet-Malassis.
- Taillandier, A (1836). "Notice biographique sur J.-A. Dulaure, membre honoraire de la Société des antiquaires de France" [Biographical note on J.-A. Dulaure, honorary member of the Société des antiquaires de France]. Mémoires de la Société royale des antiquaires de France (in French).
