= Société des Antiquaires de France =

Parisian historical and archaeological society

The Société des Antiquaires de France (Society of Antiquaries of France) is a Parisian historical and archaeological society, founded in 1804 under the name of the Académie celtique (Celtic Academy). It is now based at the Louvre, in the pavillon Mollien.

== History ==
The Académie celtique was founded by prefect Jacques Cambry, Jacques-Antoine Dulaure and Jacques Le Brigant on 9 germinal Year XII (30 March 1804), with the goal of studying Gallic civilization and French history and archaeology. Cambry was its first president, until his death in 1807. In 1813 it changed its name to the Société des Antiquaires de France, after the Society of Antiquaries of London, and from 1814 to 1848 it changed again to the Société royale des antiquaires de France under the Bourbon Restoration. According to the regime in France, it was then called the Société impériale des antiquaires de France or Société nationale des antiquaires de France, but it re-assumed its present name in 1871, and has not changed it since.

Since its foundation it has published a collection of Mémoires, and of Bulletins, as well as an annual directory of its members.

== Some members ==
The site of the Société nationale des Antiquaires de France publishes prosopographical records of its members among which are:

- Eustache-Hyacinthe Langlois (1777-1837)
- Bernard Germain de Lacépède (1756-1825)
- Jean-Denis Barbié du Bocage (1760-1825)
- Jean Anthelme Brillat-Savarin (1755-1826)
- Jacques-Antoine Dulaure (1755-1835)
- Gabriel Vaugeois (1753-1836)
- Alexandre Lenoir (1761-1839)
- Alexandre du Sommerard (1779-1842)
- Charles Nodier (1780-1844)
- Alexandre-Évariste Fragonard (1780-1850)
- François Guizot (1787-1874)
- Auguste Mariette (1821-1881)
- Jules Quicherat (1814-1882)
- Gustave de Clausade (1815-1888)
- Maximin Deloche (1817-1900)
- Ernest Renan (1823-1892)
- Louis Courajod (1841-1896)
- Lecoy de La Marche (1839-1897)
- Alexandre Bertrand (1820-1902)
- Auguste Molinier (1851-1904)
- Louis Demaison (1852–1937)
- Léopold Delisle (1826-1910)
- Auguste Longnon (1844-1911)
- Antoine Héron de Villefosse (1845-1919)
- Louis Duchesne (1843-1922)
- Henri-François Delaborde (1854-1927)
- Gustave Schlumberger (1844-1929)
- François Martroye (1852–1933), historian of ancient Rome
- Joseph Berthelot, baron de Baye (1853- 1931)
- Paul Fournier (1853-1935)
- Paul Monceaux (1859-1941)
- Marcel Aubert (1884-1962)
- Jérôme Carcopino (1881-1970)
- Jean Vallery-Radot (1890-1971)
- Paul Deschamps (1888-1974)
- Charles Perrat (1899-1976)
- Henri-Irénée Marrou (1904-1977)
- Jean Babelon (1889-1978)
- Hans-Georg Pflaum (1902-1979)
- Charles Samaran (1879-1982)
- Michel de Boüard (1909-1989)
- André Grabar (1896-1990)
- André Chastel (1912-1990)
- Jacques Dubois (1919-1991)
- Louis Carolus-Barré (1910-1993)
- Jean Hubert (1902-1994)
- Jacques Heurgon (1903-1995)
- André Chastagnol (1920-1996)
- Laurent-François Dethier (1757-1843)
- Paul-Marie Duval (1912-1997)
- Léon Pressouyre (1935-2009)
- Robert-Henri Bautier (1922-2010)
- Claude Lepelley (1934-2015)
- Gabriel Peignot
- Gustave de Clausade
- Jean-François Le Gonidec
- Léopold Delisle
- Fortia d’Urban
- Philippe Contamine, its present secrétaire
- Almudena Domínguez Arranz (born 1949)

== Some foreign members ==
- Wilhelm von Humboldt (1767–1835)
- Ferdinand Keller (1800–1881)
- Giovanni Battista De Rossi (1822–1894)
- Otto Hirschfeld (1843–1922)
- Karl Ferdinand Werner (1924–2008)
- Teofilo Ruiz

== Publications ==
- Mémoires de l’Académie Celtique ou Mémoires d’Antiquités Celtiques, Gauloises et Françaises, 5 volumes, 1807-1812.
- Mémoires de la Société nationale des Antiquaires de France, 1e série, 10 volumes (I à X), 1817-1834.
- Mémoires de la Société royale des Antiquaires de France, 2e série, 10 volumes (XI à XX), 1835-1850.
- Mémoires de la Société impériale des Antiquaires de France, 3e série, 10 volumes (XXI à XXX), 1852-1868.
- Mémoires de la Société nationale des Antiquaires de France, 4e série, 10 volumes (XXXI à XL), 1869-1879.
- Mémoires de la Société nationale des Antiquaires de France, 5e série, 10 volumes (XLI à L), 1880-1889.
- Mémoires de la Société nationale des Antiquaires de France, 6e série, 10 volumes (LI à LX), 1890-1899.
- Mémoires de la Société nationale des Antiquaires de France, 7e série, 10 volumes (LXI à LXX), 1900-1910.
- Mémoires de la Société nationale des Antiquaires de France, 8e série, 10 volumes (LXXI à LXXX), 1911-1937.
- Mémoires de la Société nationale des Antiquaires de France, 9e série, 5 volumes (LXXXI à LXXXIV), 1944-2010.
- Table alphabétique des publications de l’Académie celtique et de la Société des Antiquaires de France (1807-1889), Paris, Klincksieck, 1894.
- Table alphabétique des publications de la Société des Antiquaires de France (1890-1938), Paris, 1944.
- Table alphabétique des publications de la Société des Antiquaires de France (1939-1991), Paris, 1994.
- Mettensia. Mémoires et documents, 7 volumes (I à VII), 1897-1919.
- Mettensia. Mémoires et documents, fasc. 1-4 (VIII), 1923-1927.
- Centenaire 1804-1904, Paris, 1904.
- Mélanges en hommage à la mémoire de François Martroye (1940).
- Mémorial d’un voyage d’études de la Société nationale des Antiquaires de France en Rhénanie (1953)
- Cent-cinquantenaire de la Société, Mémoires LXXXIII (1954).
- Bicentenaire 1804-2004, Mémoires 9e série t. V, Paris, De Boccard, 2010.
- Bulletin de la Société impériale des Antiquaires de France, 1852-1870 ISSN 1153-2548
- Bulletin de la Société nationale des Antiquaires de France, 1870 — ISSN 0081-1181

== Bibliography ==
- Nicole Belmont (édition et préface) : Aux sources de l’ethnologie française : l’Académie celtique. Edit. du C.T.H.S., 1995, ISBN 2-7355-0322-4.
- BELMONT (Nicole), “L’Académie celtique et George Sand. Les débuts des recherches folkloriques en France”, Romantisme, Vol. 5, n° 9, 1975, p. 29-38.
- BELMONT (Nicole), CHAMARAT (Josselyne), GLÜCK Denise et al. “L’Académie celtique”, in: Hier pour demain. Arts, Traditions et Patrimoine, catalogue d’exposition du Grand-Palais, 13 juin-1er septembre 1980, Paris, RNM, 1980, p. 54-77.
- DURRY (Marie-Jeanne), “L’Académie celtique et la chanson populaire”, Revue de littérature comparée, tome IX, 1929, p. 62-73.
- GAIDOZ (Henri), “De l’influence de l’Académie celtique sur les études de folk-lore”, Recueil du Centenaire de la Société nationale des Antiquaires de France, 1804-1904, p. 135-143.
- OZOUF (Mona), “L’invention de l’ethnographie française : le questionnaire de l’Académie celtique”, Annales. Histoire, Sciences sociales, Vol. 36, n° 2, 1981, p. 210-230.
