= Chapelle de Lothéa =

Chapel in Quimperlé, France

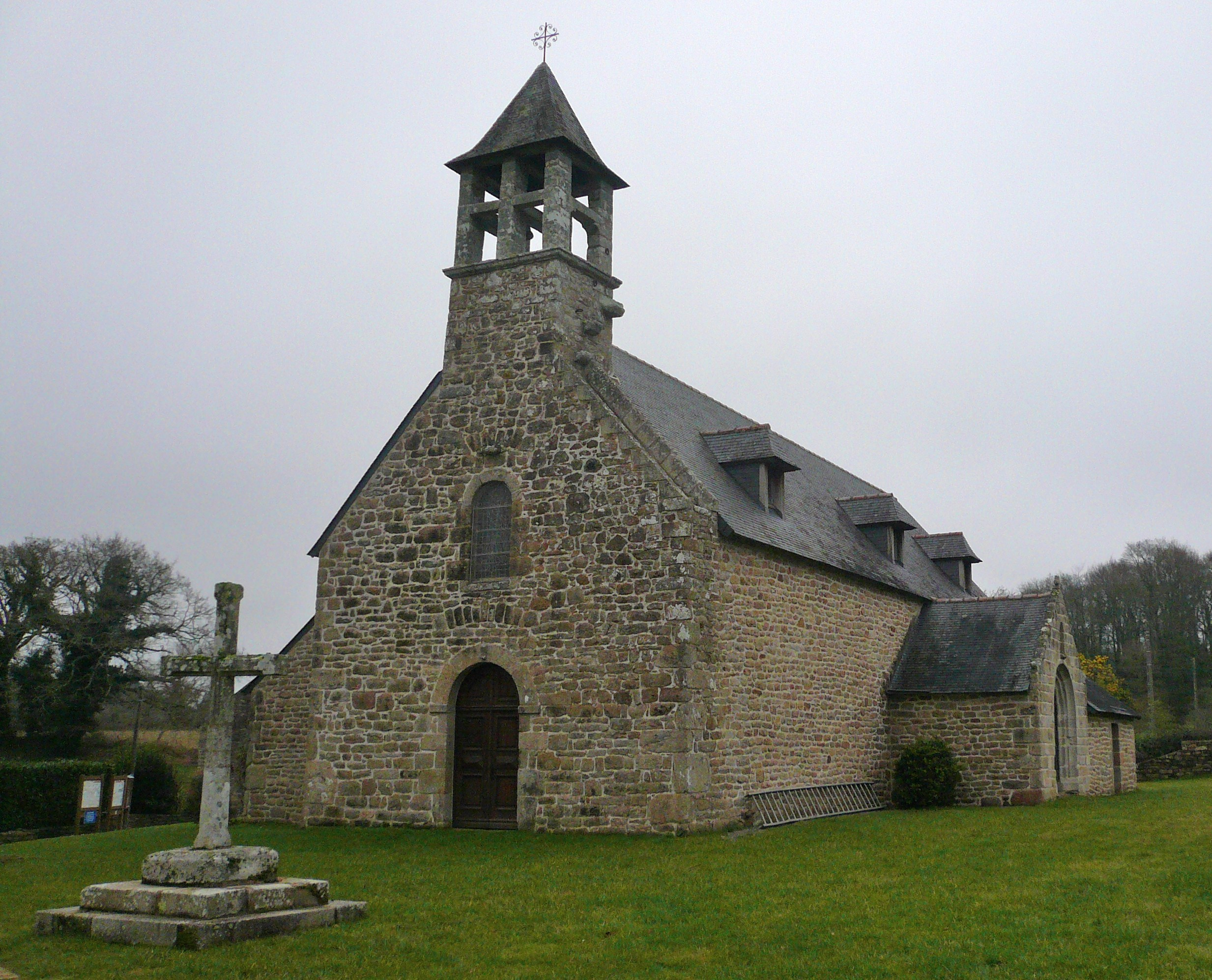
- View of the chapel with its calvary

- Location within Brittany

Religion
- Affiliation: Catholic
- District: Quimperlé
- Province: Finistère
- Region: Britany

Location
- Country: France
- Interactive map of Chapelle de Lothéa
- Coordinates: 47.8496°N 3.5427°W

Architecture
- Completed: 1995

The Chapelle de Lothéa is a Roman Catholic religious building in Quimperlé, France. Founded nearly ten centuries ago, it is one of the oldest monuments in Quimperlé, albeit a modest one. At one time, it was the seat of the largest parish in the Quimperlé region: the parish of Lohéa comprised 73 villages or hamlets, and included most of the Toulfoën forest, as well as the trève of Trélivalaire.

== Parish history ==
Saint They or Saint Théa, a little-known early 20th-century saint, was a disciple of Saint Guénolé, a monk from Landévennec. The date of the chapel's foundation is still unknown, but it wasn't until 1029 that we heard mention of this "monastela" in the deed of gift from Alain Canhiart, Count of Cornouaille, to the Abbey of Sainte-Croix. In fact, Alain Canhiart, who had fallen ill in his castle at Quimperlé, decided, in addition to founding the monastery dedicated to the Holy Cross, to give the Abbey the small monastery dedicated to Saint Thea, which shows that there was at least one oratory dedicated to this saint before 1029.

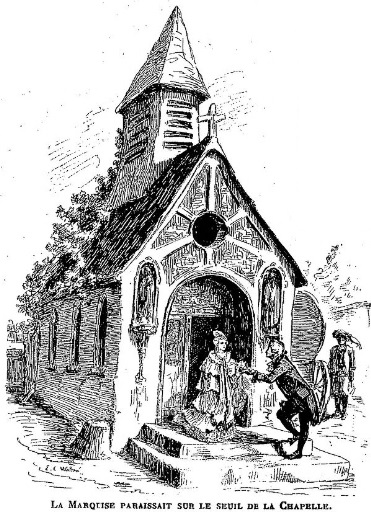
1907 drawing of the Lothéa chapel (illustration of a short story by Léon de Tinseau)

After having been part of the early Armorica parish of Mellac, Lothéa was later erected as a parish by the bishop of Quimper with the approval of the monks of Sainte-Croix. Lothéa could only have had a small income due to its proximity to the powerful abbey.

The parish church was undoubtedly ruined during the English invasion of the region in 1373. Houses in Lothéa were burnt down during the League Wars by the notorious brigand Guy Eder de La Fontenelle.

It wasn't until the rector Jean Cariou, two centuries later, that the ancient sanctuary was restored to the form we knew before its complete ruin. Rector Cariou died in general veneration in 1691. He was buried in the small porch he had built some twenty years earlier.

In 1759, the parish of Lothéa had to provide 17 men a year to serve as coastguards.

Jean-Baptiste Ogée described Lothéa in 1778 as follows:

Lothéa; on the edge of the Carnoët forest; 9 and a half leagues east-southeast of Quimper, its bishopric; 30 and a half leagues from Rennes and half a league from Quimperlé, its subdelegation and the jurisdiction of its high justice. The parish is under the authority of the King and has 1,000 communicants , including those of Trélivaler [Trélivalaire], its trève. The parish priest is the abbot of Sainte-Croix de Quimperlé. This territory, covered with trees and bushes, offers a view of the Carnoët forest, which belongs to the King, valleys, mountains, farmland and meadows. The river Laïta crosses this territory, which contains the noble houses of Rosmain-Glasse [Ros-an-Menglaz], Kerlidu and Quelbin [Queblen]

—

On the eve of the Revolution, the parish was very poor; it included the trève de Trélivalaire. It was a small parish, comprising a tiny village, a few peasant hamlets and numerous forest lodges, as well as a small urban district on the outskirts of Quimperlé. The last rector was Jacques Galliot (he succeeded Guillaume Guillou, appointed rector of Mellac), appointed rector of Lothéa in 1783; surrounded by his parishioners, he drew up the cahier de doléances on 27 March 1789, but categorically refused to take the oath to the civil constitution of the clergy; he was imprisoned in the château de Brest, then deported to Spain; he was subsequently appointed rector of Clohars-Carnoët in 1802.

In 1790, Lothéa was transformed into a commune, but its existence was short-lived, being abolished on 7 August 1791 and annexed by Quimperlé, with some hamlets being annexed by the communes of Clohars-Carnoët and Moëlan-sur-Mer. In 1791, the Quimperlé municipality decided to suppress the parish, despite protests from parishioners, following the rector's refusal to take the oath of loyalty to the Civil Constitution of the Clergy. Two years later, the presbytery was sold as bien national (bought by Jacques Cambry), as was the parish enclosure (bought by Louis Le Nir, uncle of the future poet Auguste Brizeux); clandestine ceremonies were held in the church. In 1797, the church was bought back by the ploughman Le Beuz, so that it could belong to everyone, thanks to a collection made in the parish.

The parish was abolished with the Concordat of 1801, and the church became a simple chapel, with little activity other than the pardons of Easter Tuesday, Rogation Monday and, above all, the grand pardon on Trinity Sunday. In 1869, Ernest du Laurens de la Barre wrote a story about this grand pardon.

Abandoned in 1947, the church collapsed ten years later, becoming a stone quarry, with only the gable and bell tower remaining. Ruined in 1985, the Lothéa chapel has since been meticulously restored by the passionate volunteers of the Comité de Sauvegarde, chaired by General de La Villemarqué.

== Chapel ==
=== Architecture ===
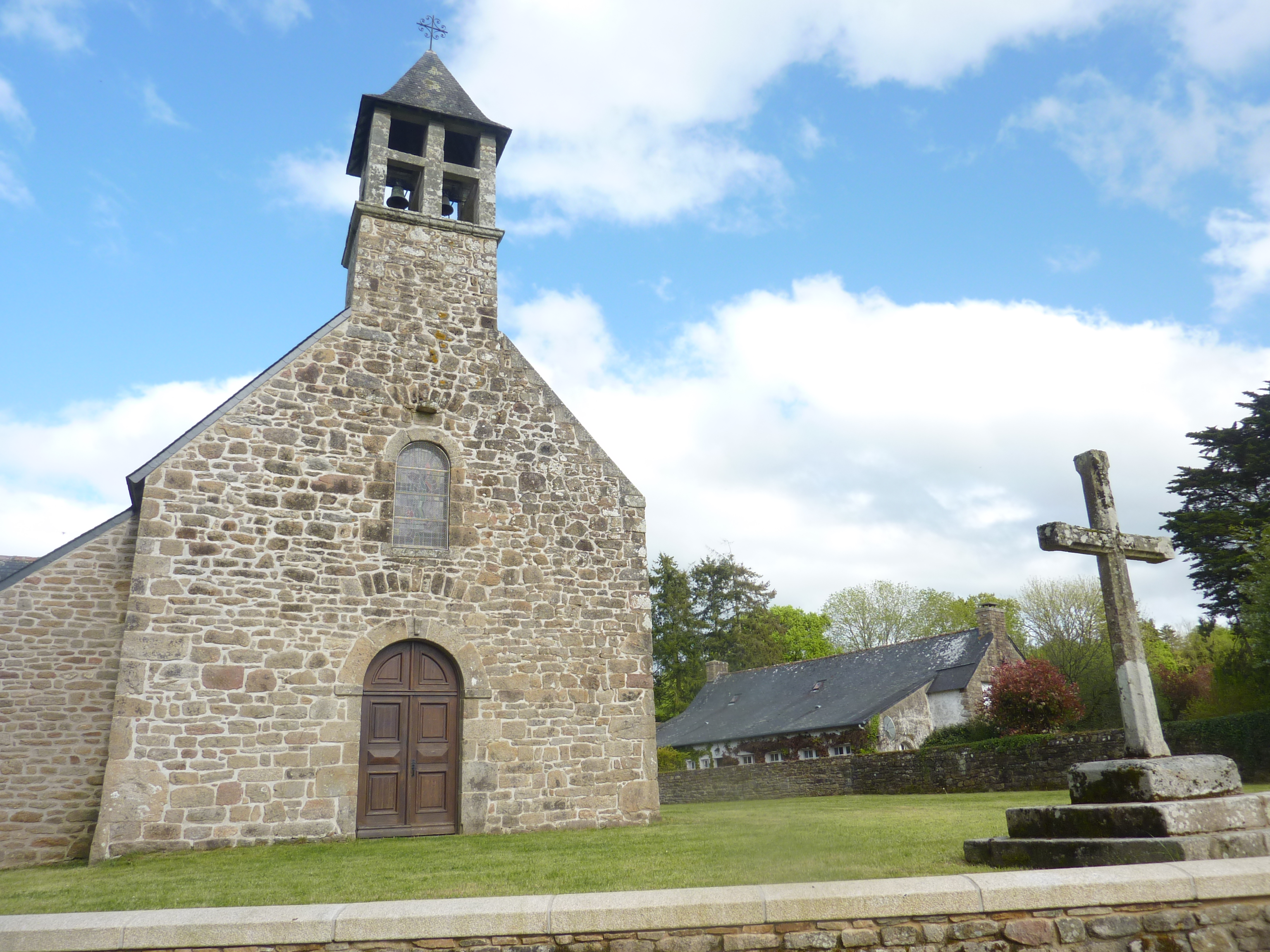
The chapel of Lothéa and its calvary.

The church, redesigned by Jean Cariou in the 17th century, was 18 m long and 9 m wide. He built the bell tower, which was restored in 1986. To embellish his church, he added a small porch overlooking the cemetery. He also rebuilt the north aisle and added an attractive stained-glass window to the left of the choir. Three small skylights in the roof provided diffused light in the main nave, creating an atmosphere conducive to contemplation. The main nave was separated from the north aisle by Gothic arches. The painted wooden high altar dates from the 17th century.

The Lothéa church is a rectangle with two naves separated by four cylindrical columns and a flat apse. Two engaged half-columns to the east and west support five ogival arches whose mouldings penetrate directly into the columns without capitals. The absence of capitals and the profile of the arches are typical of the late 15th and early 16th centuries. Nothing remains of the Romanesque monument that preceded it. The side porch and bell tower were added during the reign of Louis XIV. Between this porch and the east side of the church, the former chapel dedicated to Notre-Dame de Lorette was used as a sacristy. The north-facing oeil-de-boeuf windows are used for lighting.

The porch, formerly moved to the base of the Saint Colomban church in 1960, was reassembled in the Lothéa chapel in the summer of 1987. Only the molded arches, the surrounding stones and the niche above it bear witness to its origins in the time of Recteur Cariou.

Opposite the chapel is the former clergy house, now inhabited. A mission cross dating from 1912 and 1938 was broken in the winter of 1967. It was rebuilt in autumn 1986. There is also a bread oven, restored in 1986, whose corbels were stolen during the restoration.

=== Furniture and decoration ===
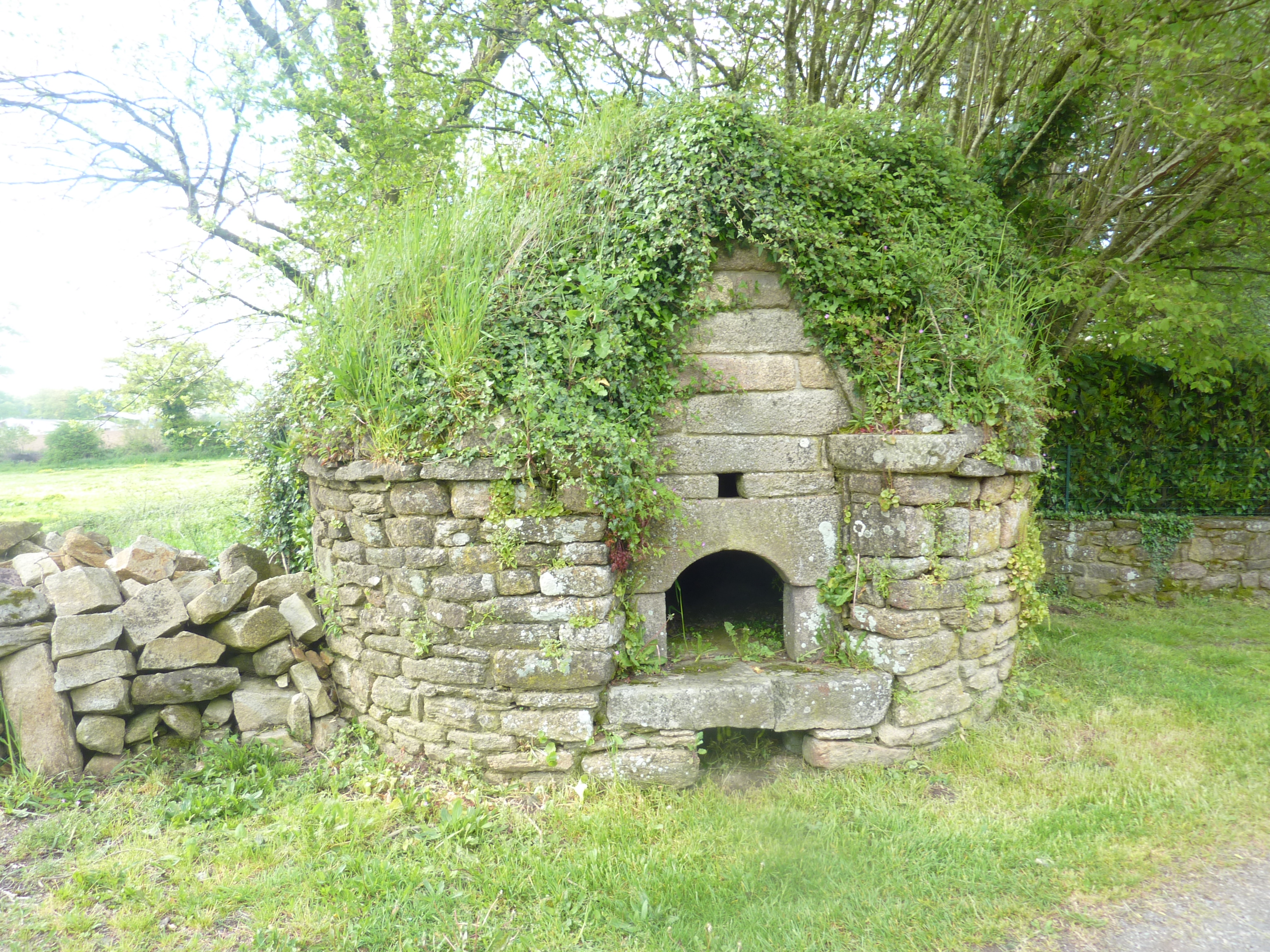
Old oven near the Lothéa chapel.

A small church in a poor parish, the church of Saint Théa never possessed the rich furnishings of urban sanctuaries, pilgrimage chapels or even wealthy rural parishes. What's more, inventories are incomplete or contradictory, and the modest testimonies to a secular piety have disappeared either legally or by theft.

There were probably at least three altars: a high altar dating from the 17th century, a side altar to the north and a seigneurial chapel.

The statues seem to have belonged to two groups, one earlier than Abbé Cariou, the other contemporary. They include a small Pietà, a Virgin Mother and a St. Yves. The memory and characteristics of these 3 stolen statues are preserved in three photographs. A wooden St Théa preserved in the church of Notre-Dame de Quimperlé joins this group of statues.

The other statues date back to the 17th century: the large Christ is also in Notre-Dame, while the Eternal Father is currently in the Abbey church of Sainte Croix. Two other statues were brought from Lothéa to Notre-Dame in 1949: a large Pietà and Notre-Dame de Vérité, currently at Sainte Croix. Since 2009, the committee has had a polychrome wooden Saint Théa sculpted by an artist from Châteauneuf-du-Faou. Three 1.5m statues have been donated: a Sacré-Coeur, a Sainte Germaine and a Vierge.

The baptismal font was sheltered in the garden of the Quimperlé presbytery for several years. Today, the baptistery and font have been returned to the interior of the Lothéa chapel. They are a reduced granite version of the superb baptistery in Notre-Dame church.

In 2000, after 15 years' work, the stained-glass windows were installed. The wall of the placître, the wash-house and the fountain monument were rebuilt. In 2010, the association financed the renovation of the chapel's main entrance. The large pillars are now in place, framed by two "strapen an diaoul" (devil's traps). These are two low, flat stones that prevent stray animals from entering, but allow access to the chapel without having to open the gate. These elements are common in Brittany, and are thought to have a superstitious side: brides had to step over them to get to the chapel.

The Pardon de Lothéa takes place every year on the Sunday after Pentecost.

== See also ==
- Sainte-Croix de Quimperlé Abbey
- Saint-Thégonnec Parish close
