= Jean-Pierre Babelon =

French historian (1931–2024)

President of the Académie des Inscriptions et Belles-Lettres
- In office 2001
- Preceded by: Philippe Contamine
- Succeeded by: Jean Richard

Personal details
- Born: 17 November 1931 6th arrondissement of Paris, France
- Died: 2 February 2024 (aged 92) Paris, France
- Education: École Nationale des Chartes; École du Louvre
- Occupation: Historian

Jean-Pierre Babelon (17 November 1931 – 2 February 2024) was a French historian.

== Biography ==
Born in the 6th arrondissement of Paris, Babelon was the son of historian Jean Babelon and the grandson of historian Ernest Babelon. He graduated from the École Nationale des Chartes in 1950 with a thesis titled La demeure parisienne sous Henri IV et Louis XIII. He then became an assistant archivist for the Departmental Archives of Yvelines and subsequently studied at the École du Louvre.

The majority of his career was spent at the Archives Nationales as a curator for the Musée des Archives Nationales. In addition to his research, he was a senior lecturer at the École pratique des hautes études with a particular focus on the French Wars of Religion. From 1989 to 1996, he curated the Palace of Versailles museum. He joined the Académie des Inscriptions et Belles-Lettres in 1992 and served as its president in 2001, succeeding Philippe Contamine and preceding Jean Richard. He was responsible for the curation of the Musée Jacquemart-André and the Chaalis Abbey.

In 2010, Babelon, alongside Louis Alphonse de Bourbon, worked on the reburial of Henry IV of France at the Tombs in Saint-Denis. A ceremony for the reburial was planned by President Nicolas Sarkozy for May 2012. However, the ensuing controversy and the upcoming presidential election delayed the event, and the project was eventually abandoned by François Hollande. In 2012, he joined the scientific council Figaro histoire.

Babelon died on 2 February 2024, at the age of 92.

== Publications ==
- Historique et description des bâtiments des Archives nationales (1958)
- Demeures parisiennes sous Henri IV et Louis XIII (1965)
- Le Palais de justice, la Conciergerie, la Sainte-Chapelle (1966)
- Richesses d’art du quartier des Halles, maison par maison (1968)
- L'Église Saint-Roch à Paris (1972)
- Paris monumental (1974)
- Henri IV (1982)
- Paris au xvie siècle (1987)
- Le Marais, mythe et réalité (1987)
- Châteaux de France au siècle de la Renaissance (1989)
- "La Notion de patrimoine" (1995)
- François Mansart. Le Génie de l’architecture (1998)
- Les Fresques de Tiepolo (1998)
- Chantilly (1999)
- Jardins à la française (1999)
- Le Château d'Amboise (2004)
- Le Palais de l'Institut. Du collège des Quatre-Nations à l'Institut de France (2005)
- Paris au xvie siècle (2007)
- Primatice à Chaalis (2007)
- L'Abbaye royale de Chaalis et les collections Jacquemart-André (2007)
- L'Église Saint-Roch ou la Grâce divine en action (2008)
- Les Archives. Mémoires de la France (2008)

== Awards ==
- Prix Hercule-Catenacci for Paris monumental (1976)
- Prix Monseigneur-Marcel for Henri IV (1982)
- Prix Bordin for Châteaux de France au siècle de la Renaissance (1990)
- Prix Eugène-Carrière for Jardins à la française (2000)

== Decorations ==
- Commander of the Legion of Honour
- Grand Officer of the Ordre national du Mérite
- Commander of the Ordre des Palmes académiques
- Commander of the Ordre des Arts et des Lettres
- Commander of the Order pro Merito Melitensi
- Knight of the Order of the Polar Star
