= Demaison =

Demaison is a surname. Notable people with the surname include:

- François-Xavier Demaison (actor) (born 1973), French actor and comedian
- François-Xavier Demaison (engineer), French motor racing engineer
- Louis Demaison (1852–1937), French historiographer and archaeologist
