= Almudena Domínguez Arranz =

Galician numismatist and archaeologist

- Born: 1949 (age 76–77)
- Citizenship: Spain
- Occupations: Numismatist; Archaeologist

Academic background
- Education: University of Zaragoza
- Thesis: Las cecas Ibéricas del Valle del Ebro (1979)
- Website: https://www.almudenadominguezarranz.es/

Almudena Domínguez Arranz (born 1949) is a Spanish archaeologist and numismatist, who is Professor of Archaeology in the Department of Ancient Sciences at the University of Zaragoza. Her work focuses on archaeological and numismatic heritage, the history of women and museology.

== Career ==
Domínguez graduated in Philosophy and Letters from the University of Zaragoza in 1977, with a doctoral thesis entitled Las cecas Ibéricas del Valle del Ebro. It was published by the Institution of Ferdinand the Catholic. After graduation she continued to work at the university as a lecturer and was promoted to Professor of Archaeology in the Department of Ancient Sciences in 2012. She was director of the MA in 'Museums: Education and Communication' until 2019.

Archaeological and numismatic heritage, museology and the history of women in antiquity are key foci for Domínguez' research. She has also led various excavations including: the Gallo-Roman oppidum of Bibracte in Burgundy; La Castellina in Civitaveccia, Italy; sanctuary-palace of Cancho Roano in Badajoz; oppidum of La Vispesa in Tamarite de Litera. She is a member of the Spanish Association for Research into the History of Women, the Société des Antiquaires de France and is a member of the Peninsular Numismatic Symposium and of the Governing Board of the Institute of Altoaragonese Studies.

== Selected works ==
- Las cecas ibéricas del Valle del Ebro; Zaragoza, 1979
- Medallas de la Antigüedad: las acuñaciones ibéricas y romanas de Osca; Huesca, 1991
- Carta arqueológica de España: Huesca; Zaragoza, 1985 (coautora)
- La Vispesa: foco de romanización de la Ilergecia Occidental; Huesca, 1994.
- El patrimonio numismático del Ayuntamiento de Huesca; Huesca, 1996
- Historia monetaria de la Hispania Antigua; Madrid, 1998.
- La voie secondaire entre l´îlot aux grandes caves et l´îlot du Grand atelier de forges
- Centre Européen du Mont-Beuvray, Glux-en-Glenne, 1995.
- Actas del II Encontro Peninsular de Numismatica Antiga, Oporto, 1999
- «Bibracte en Borgoña. Un yacimiento arqueológico europeo y catorce años de participación científica española» 2000.
- Rosa María Cid López, Almudena Domínguez Arranz y Rosa María Marina Sáez (eds.), Madres y familias en la Antigüedad. Patrones femeninos en la transmisión de emociones y de patrimonio, Gijón, Ediciones Trea, 2021.
