= Léon Pressouyre =

French medieval art historian (1935–2009)

- Born: 27 January 1935; Bayonne
- Died: 10 August 2009 (aged 74); Athens
- Occupation: Historian of art

Léon Pressouyre (27 January 1935 – 10 August 2009) was a French historian of medieval art.

An agrégé of history, he was a member of the École française de Rome (1964–1966). Attached then maître de recherches at the Centre National de la Recherche Scientifique, he was professor of art history and archaeology of the Middle Ages at the University Paris I from 1980 to 1997.

He was permanent advisor of the International Council on Monuments and Sites of the UNESCO (1980–2005).

Léon Pressouyre was a member of the Société des Antiquaires de France.

== Bibliography ==
- 1962: Les Origines de la poésie lyrique d'oïl et les premiers trouvères, with M. Cluzel
- 1981: Le Cloître de Notre-Dame-en-Vaux à Châlons-sur-Marne
- 1985: L'imaginaire médiéval au cloître de Notre-Dame-en-Vaux
- 1990: Le Rêve cistercien
- 1990: Saint Bernard et le monde cistercien
- 1992: Convention concernant la protection du patrimoine mondial culturel et naturel. Rapport d'évaluation présenté à l'occasion du vingtième anniversaire de la Convention
- 1994: L'espace cistercien
- 1995: Pèlerinages et croisades
- 1995: [dir.] Vivre en moyenne montagne
- 1996: L'hydraulique monastique
- 2002: La Commanderie, institution des ordres militaires dans l'Occident médiéval
- 2007: [dir.] Cité de l'architecture et du patrimoine
