= The Lady and the Unicorn =

Set of six French tapestries depicting unicorns created around 1500

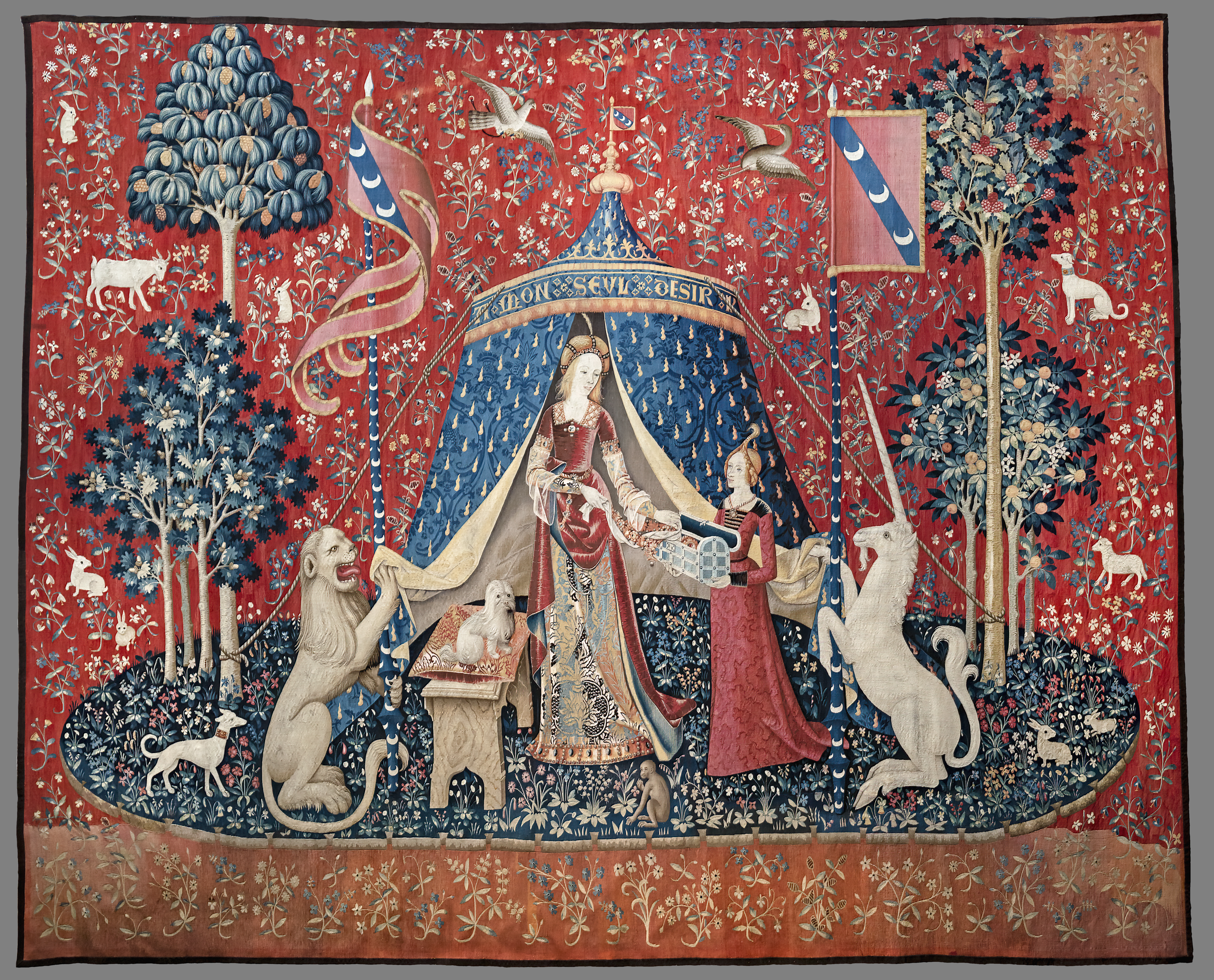
The Lady and the Unicorn: À mon seul désir (Musée national du Moyen Âge, Paris)

The Lady and the Unicorn (French: La Dame à la licorne) is the modern title given to a series of six tapestries created in the style of mille-fleurs ("thousand flowers") and woven in Flanders from wool and silk, from designs ("cartoons") drawn in Paris around 1500. The set is on display in the Musée de Cluny in Paris.

Five of the tapestries are commonly interpreted as depicting the five senses – taste, hearing, sight, smell, and touch. The sixth displays the words "À mon seul désir". The tapestry's intended meaning is obscure, but has been interpreted as representing love or understanding. Each of the six tapestries depicts a noble lady with a unicorn on her left and a lion on her right; some include a monkey in the scene.

== History ==
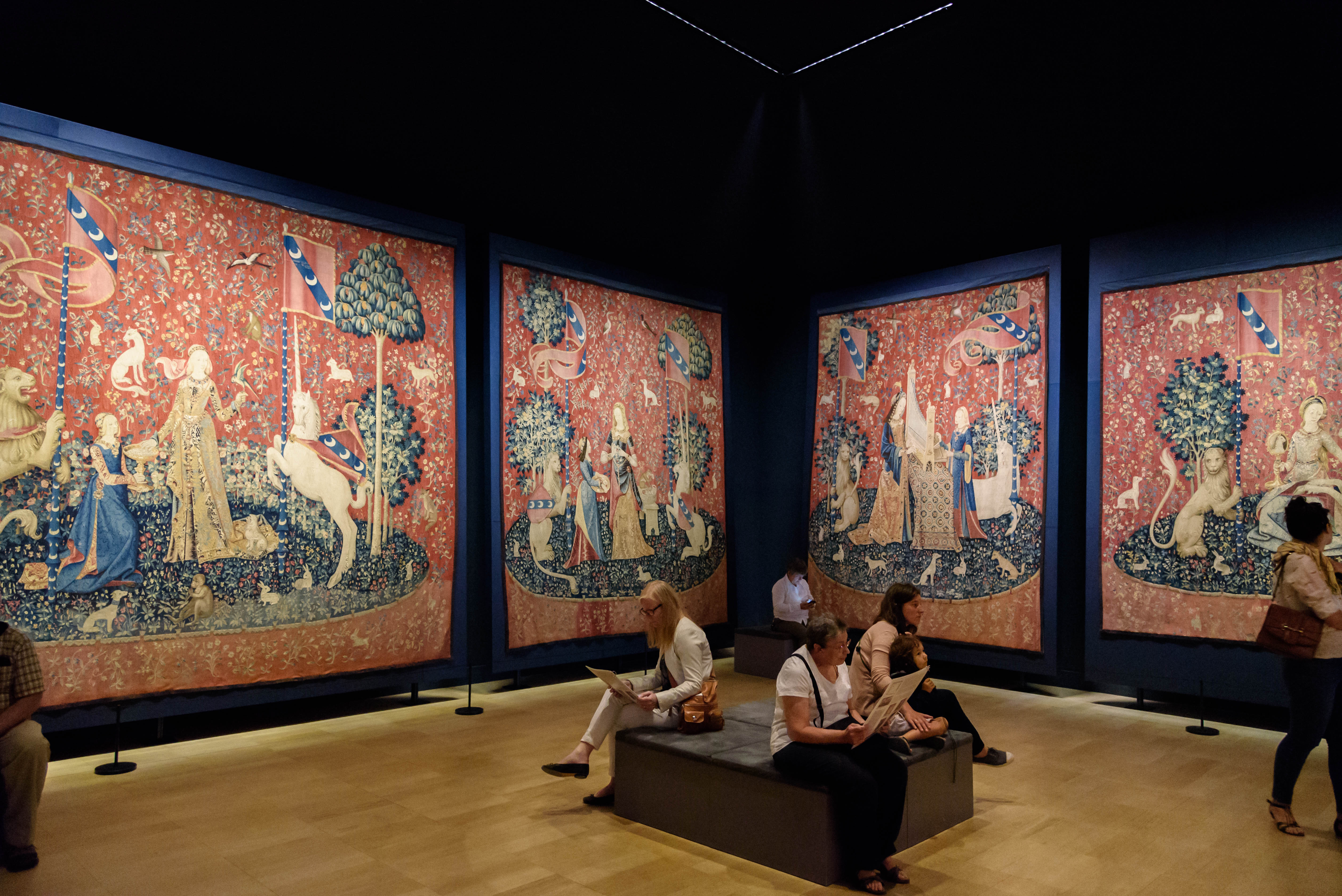
The Dame à la licorne room at the Musée de Cluny, 2015

The famous tapestries were rediscovered in 1841 by Prosper Mérimée at Boussac Castle, then owned by the subprefect of the Creuse. At the time, the tapestries were in poor condition due to improper storage, suffering from dampness and mould. In 1844, the novelist George Sand encountered the tapestries and brought them to public attention, notably through her novel Jeanne, in which she accurately dated them to the late 15th century by analyzing the ladies' costumes. Despite growing interest, the tapestries remained at risk until 1882, when Edmond Du Sommerard, curator of the Musée de Cluny in Paris, purchased them. Since then, they have undergone meticulous conservation efforts, restoring them nearly to their original splendor. Today, the tapestries are housed at the Musée de Cluny, where they remain on display.

== Content and themes ==
The subject of the tapestries is complex, and scholars "now (generally) agree that they present a meditation on earthly pleasures and courtly culture, offered through an allegory of the senses."

The pennants, as well as the armor of the unicorn and lion in the tapestry appear to bear the arms of Antoine II or Jean IV Le Viste, Baron of Montreuil, a powerful nobleman in the court of Charles VII of France and presumably its sponsor. The arms, however, appear to break the rules of French heraldry with an incorrect superposition of colors. A very recent study of the heraldry appears to lend credence to another hypothesis (previously dismissed) that the real sponsor of the tapestry was Antoine II Le Viste (1470–1534), a descendant of the younger branch of the Le Viste family and an important figure at the court of Charles VIII, Louis XII, and François I. (Note: "The coat of arms that appears on the tapestry was attributed by specialists to the older branch and to the chief of the Le Viste family, Jean IV Le Viste, but it blatantly breaks the rules of French heraldry with an incorrect superposition of colours (blue on red). While underscoring the weakness of the arguments in favour of the name Jean IV Le Viste as the patron of the tapestry, this new study suggests the probability of the intervention of Antoine II Le Viste, the descendant of the younger branch of the family, in ordering the Lady and the Unicorn. The incorrect superposition of colours could have been a deliberate choice intended to apprise the observer, in an explicit and well known manner, that he was faced with a familiar phenomenon, that of the modification of the coat of arms by a mark of cadency. Documentary sources appear to lend credence to this hypothesis.")

=== Touch ===
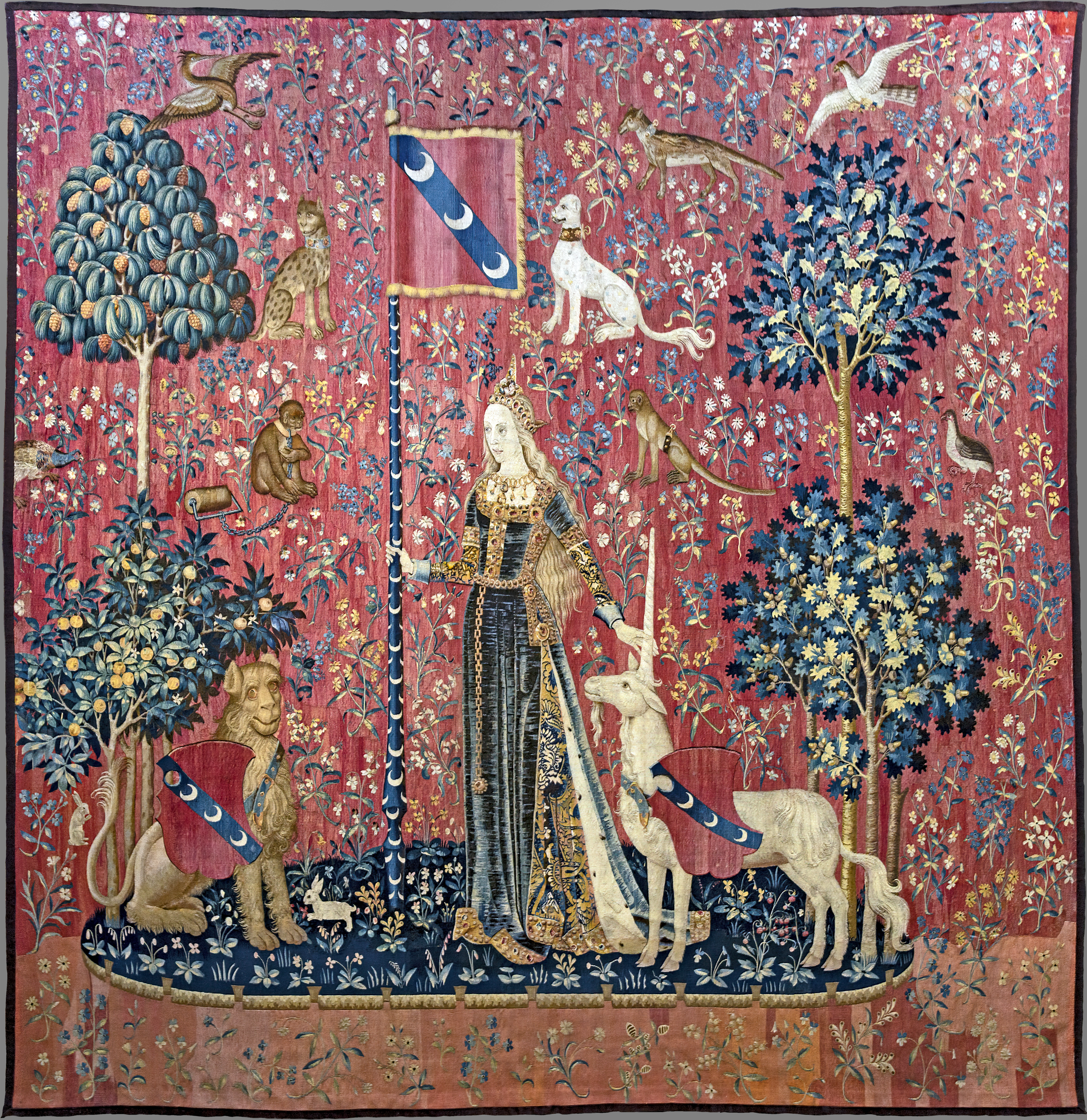
Touch, 3.15 m × 3.58 m (10.3 ft × 11.7 ft)

The 'Touch' tapestry displays a noble lady standing with one hand touching the horn of a unicorn, and the other holding up a pennant. A lion sits to the side and looks on.

=== Taste ===
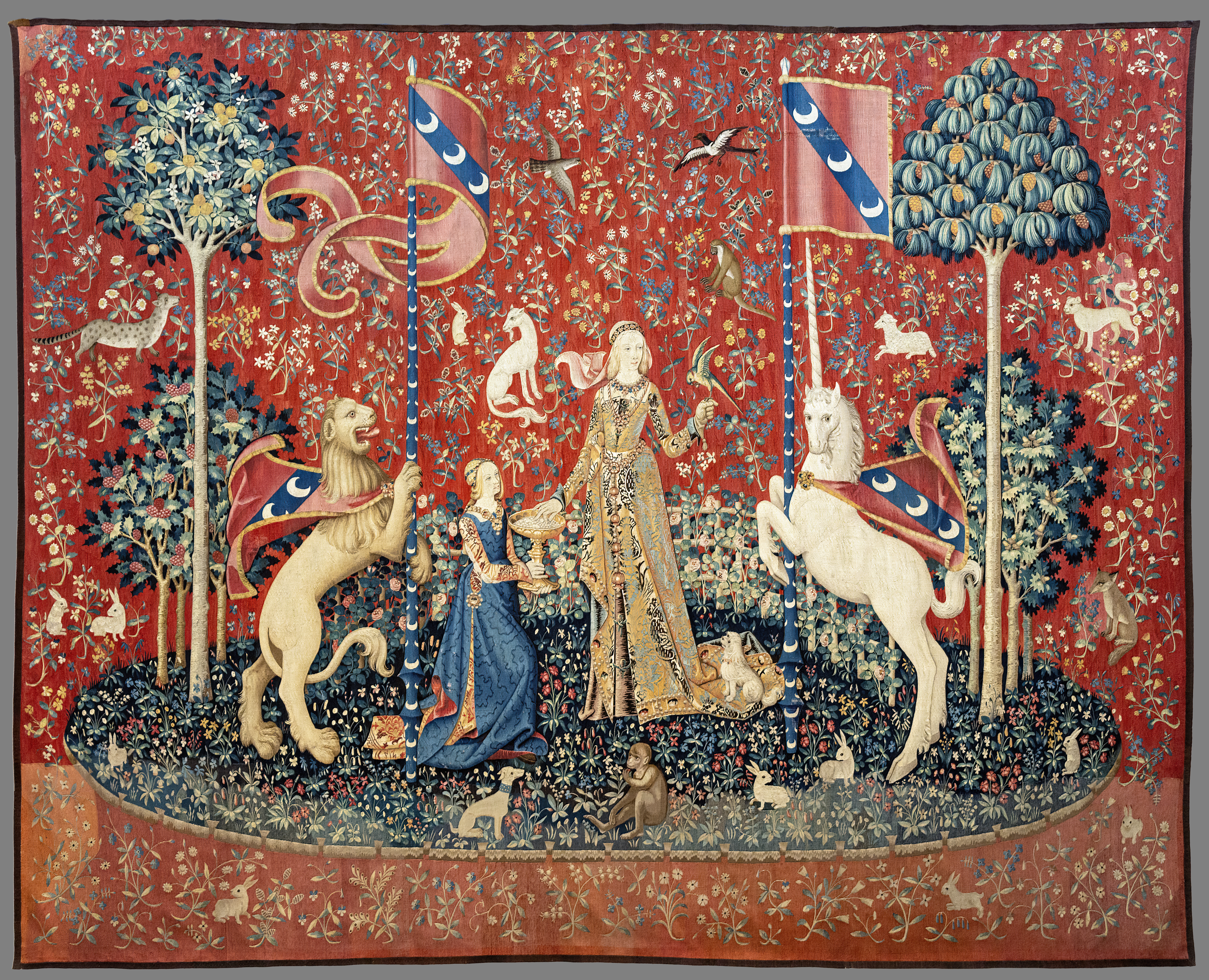
Taste, 3.75 m × 4.60 m (12.3 ft × 15.1 ft)

In the 'Taste' tapestry, the lady takes sweets from a dish held by a maidservant. Her eyes are on a parakeet on her upheld left hand. The lion and the unicorn are both standing on their hind legs, reaching up to pennants that frame the lady on either side. The monkey is at her feet, eating one of the sweetmeats. The animals within the background create an illusive environment.

=== Smell ===
Smell, 3.67 m × 3.22 m (12.0 ft × 10.6 ft)

In the 'Smell' tapestry, the lady stands, making a wreath of flowers. Her maidservant holds a basket of flowers within her easy reach. Again, the lion and unicorn frame the lady while holding on to the pennants. The monkey has stolen a flower which he is smelling, providing the key to the allegory.

=== Hearing ===
In the 'Hearing' tapestry, the lady plays a portative organ on top of a table covered with an Oriental rug. Her maidservant stands to the opposite side and operates the bellows. The lion and unicorn once again frame the scene holding up the pennants. Just as on all the other tapestries, the unicorn is to the lady's left and the lion to her right.

=== Sight ===
In the 'Sight' tapestry, the lady is seated, holding a mirror up in her right hand. The unicorn kneels on the ground, with his front legs in the lady's lap, from which he gazes at his reflection in the mirror. The lion on the left holds up a pennant.

=== À Mon Seul Désir ===
The sixth tapestry is wider than the others, and has a somewhat different style. The lady stands in front of a tent, across the top of which is inscribed her motto, "À Mon Seul Désir", one of the deliberately obscure and elegant mottos, typically alluding to courtly love, adopted by the nobility during the age of chivalry. It is variously interpreted as "to my only/sole desire", "according to my desire alone"; "by my will alone", "love desires only beauty of soul", and "to calm passion". (Note: Compare with the motto of Lady Margaret Beaufort (1441/3-1509), Me Sovent Sovant (Souvent me souviens, "Often I remember") which was adopted by St John's College, Cambridge, founded by her; also compare with the motto of John of Lancaster, 1st Duke of Bedford (1389-1435), A Vous Entier ("(Devoted) to you entirely").) These frequently appear on artworks and illuminated miniatures. Her maidservant stands to the left, holding open a chest. The lady is placing the necklace she wears in the other tapestries, into the chest. To her right is a low bench with a dog, possibly a Maltese, sitting on a decorative pillow. It is the only tapestry in which she is seen smiling. The unicorn and the lion stand in their normal spots framing the lady while holding onto the pennants.

This tapestry has elicited a number of interpretations. One interpretation sees the lady putting the necklace into the chest as a renunciation of the passions aroused by the other senses, and as an assertion of her free will. Another sees the tapestry as representing a sixth sense of understanding (derived from the sermons of Jean Gerson of the University of Paris, c. 1420). Various other interpretations see the tapestry as representing love or virginity. It is also debated whether the lady in "À Mon Seul Désir" is picking up or setting aside the necklace.

In the first five tapestries, one or more of the animals are shown using the represented sense along with the lady. In Touch, the unicorn can presumably feel the lady's hand touching its horn; in Taste, a monkey is eating a sweetmeat; in Smell, the monkey is sniffing a flower; in Hearing, the animals presumably all hear the music; and in Sight, the unicorn is gazing at itself in a mirror. In the final tapestry, only the women engage with the necklace. The blue tent in the last tapestry also serves to separate the human figures from the natural world, including the mythical unicorn, and is not present in any of the previous tapestries.

== Gallery ==
Hearing, 3.70 m × 2.90 m (12.1 ft × 9.5 ft)

Sight, 3.10 m × 3.30 m (10.2 ft × 10.8 ft)

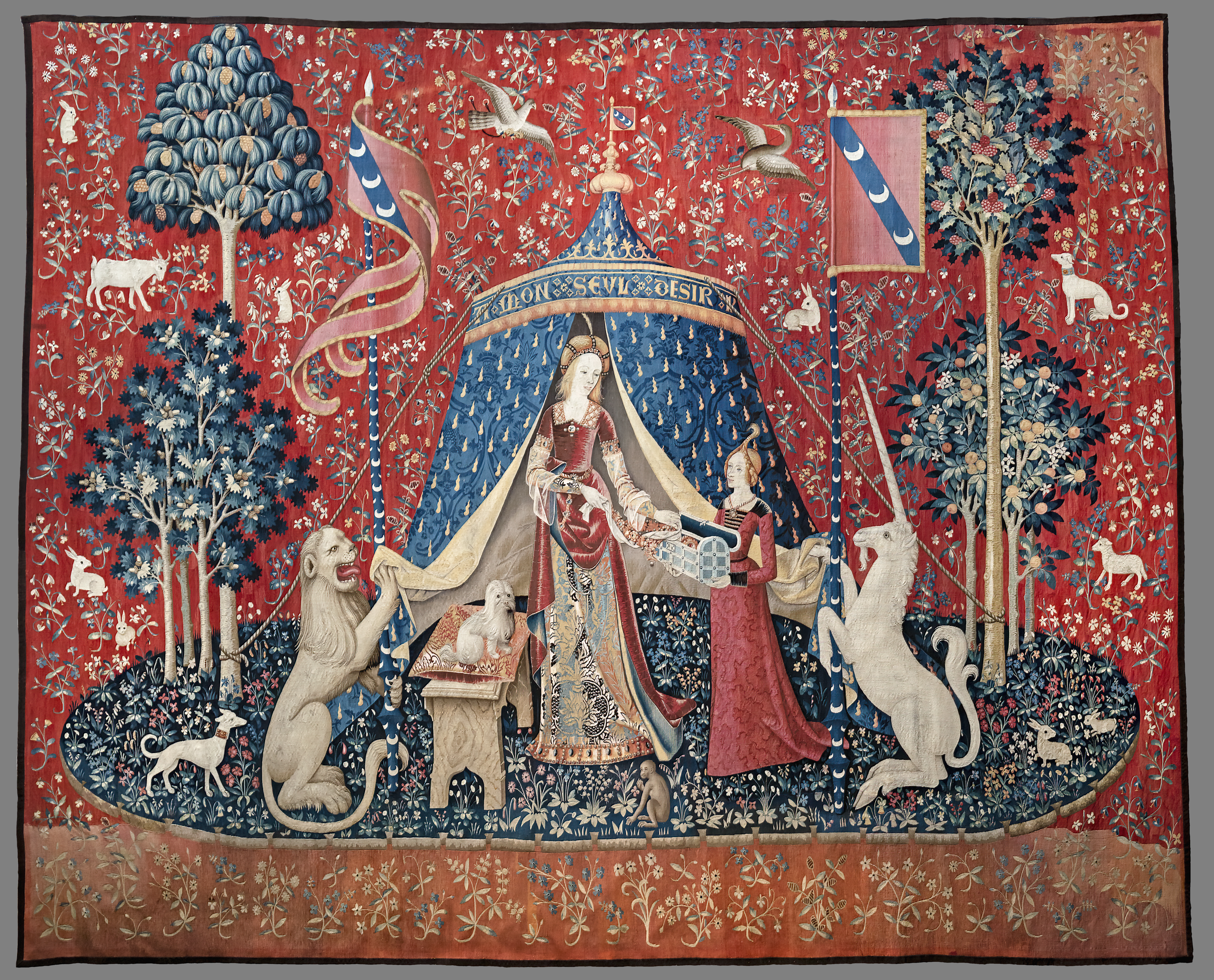
"À Mon Seul Désir", 3.80 m × 4.64 m (12.5 ft × 15.2 ft)

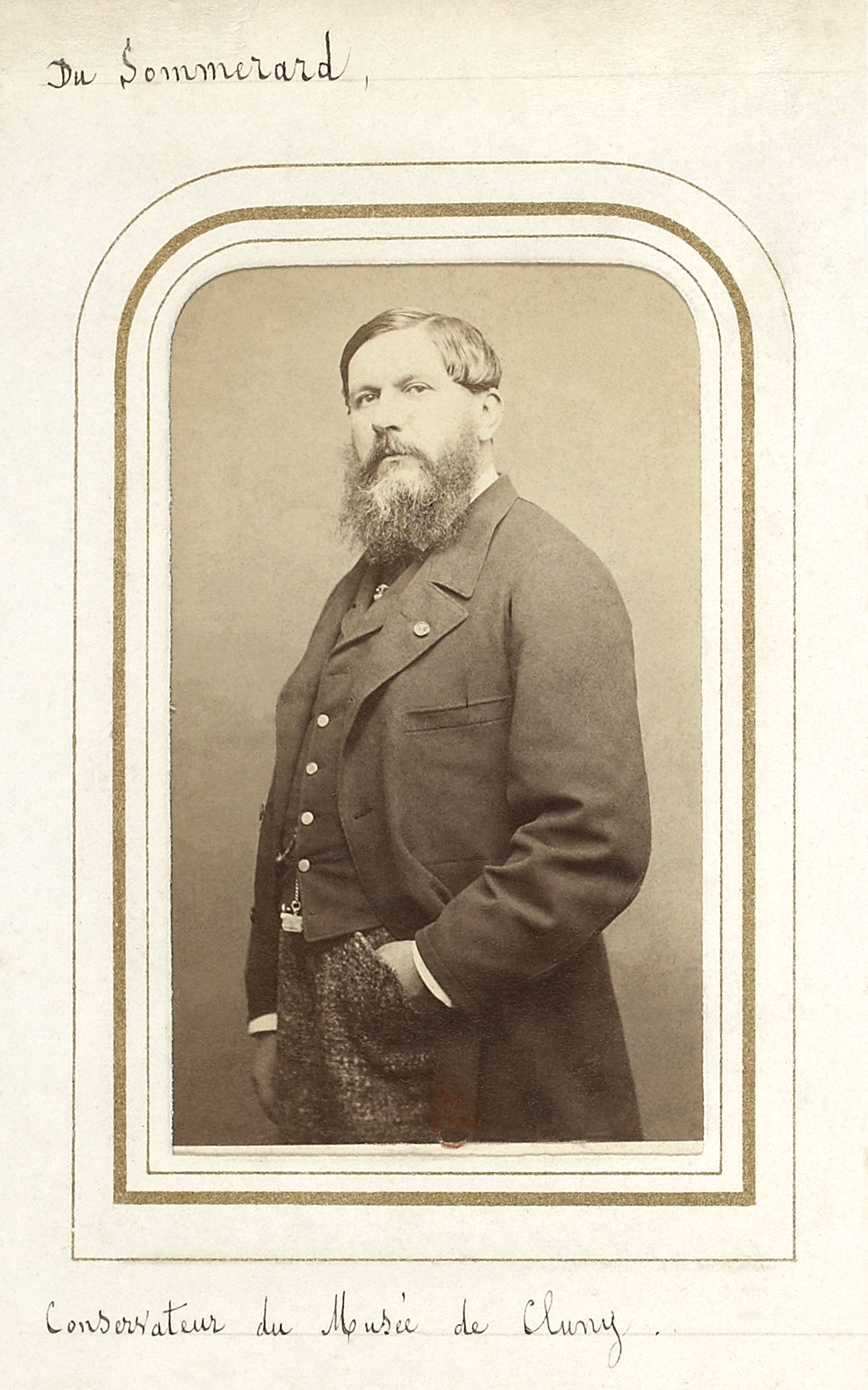
Edmond du Sommerard, curator of the Musée de Cluny, who bought the tapestries

== Popular culture ==
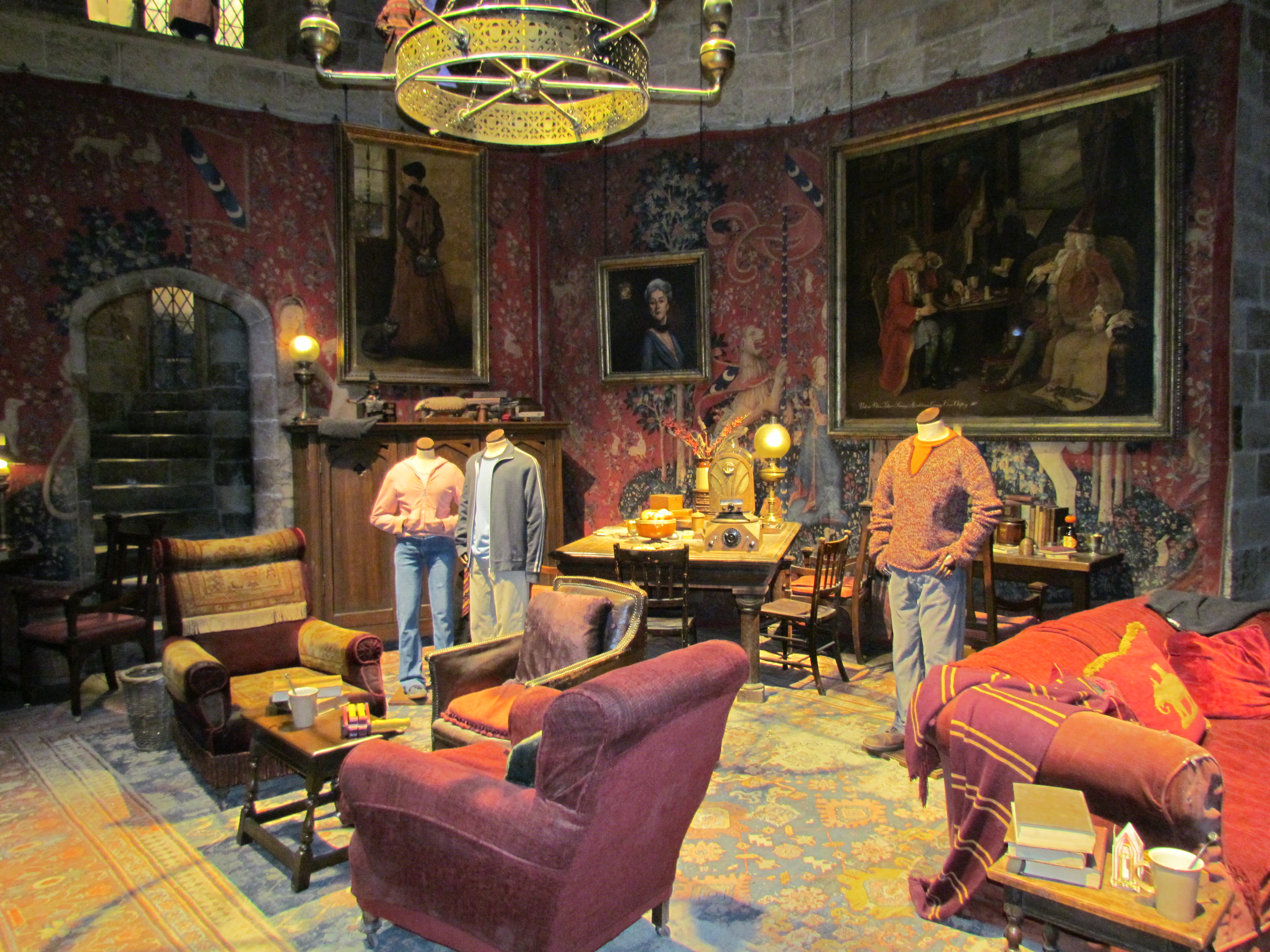
Gryffindor Common Room at Warner Bros. Studio Tour London; Taste and Sight can be seen on the right and left respectively.

- Copies of all six tapestries are used to cover the bare stone walls in the Gryffindor common room as seen in the Harry Potter film series.
- The sixth tapestry, "À Mon Seul Désir", is prominently featured in the Mobile Suit Gundam Unicorn OVA and the Mobile Suit Gundam Unicorn RE:0096 TV series, where its theme is explicitly referred to in relation to the mythical unicorn being "the beast of possibility." The symbolism of the piece representing “understanding” also coincides with the franchises themes of Newtypes, people who are able to understand and feel each other’s emotions without misunderstanding.
- The cover art for the 2014 album UnChild by Sawano Hiroyuki and Aimer, which features songs from the aforementioned Gundam OVA, is based on the tapestry, replacing the lion with a black and gold unicorn, mirroring the white unicorn--the two representing the titular mobile suits/mecha of the story.
- The sixth tapestry, "À Mon Seul Désir", is referenced in the 1937 novel The Lady and the Unicorn by Rumer Godden.
- A fictional account of the creation of the tapestries is described in the 2003 novel The Lady and the Unicorn ISBN 978-0007140909, by Tracy Chevalier.
- The tapestries are featured in the 2017 British drama film The Escape.
- The tapestries are also described in the 1910 novel The Notebooks of Malte Laurids Brigge by Rainer Maria Rilke.
- Peter Grudzien's album The Unicorn uses snippets of the tapestries for its album artwork.
- The works were the inspiration for Gustave Moreau's painting The Unicorns.
- The tapestries are featured in the 1996 adventure game, Broken Sword: The Shadow of the Templars.
- The tapestry appears in the Little Einsteins episode "The Song of The Unicorn", where the lady in the tapestry casts a spell on the unicorn, turning him into stone.
- The tapestries are the main subject in episode 20 of Belphégor, "La sixième licorne".

== See also ==
- The Hunt of the Unicorn
- Venus effect

== Bibliography ==
- Jean-Patrice Boudet, La Dame à la licorne et ses sources médiévales d'inspiration
  - Crabben, Jan van der (2023-05-31). "The Lady and the Unicorn: Medieval Tapestries". World History Encyclopedia.
  - Claisse, Pauline; de La Codre, Hortense; Nowik, Witold; Daniel, Floréal; Chapoulie, Rémy; Dallel, Mohamed; Mounier, Aurélie (2023-09-22). "Original and restored materials revealed by contactless and micro-invasive methods of the Lady and the Unicorn tapestry "Mon seul désir"". The European Physical Journal Plus. 138 (9). doi:10.1140/epjp/s13360-023-04435-x. ISSN 2190-5444.
  - Drotkiewicz, Agnieszka (2021-06-24). "The Lady and the Unicorn - Artykuły i Analizy – Przekrój". Przekrój.org. Retrieved 2026-10-04.
  - Mezoff, Rebecca (2019-08-08). "Visiting the Lady and the Unicorn." Rebecca Mezoff. Retrieved 2026-10-04.
