= Charles Perrat =

French palaeographer

Charles Perrat (14 January 1899, Lyon – 4 July 1976) was a 20th-century French paleographer, professor at the École Nationale des Chartes. An archivist, he was also a member of the Société des Antiquaires de France.

== Sources ==
- Francois (Michel), « Charles Perrat (1899-1976) », Bibliothèque de l'école des chartes, 136 (1978), p. 449-455 online
- François (Martine), « PERRAT Charles Claude Jacques », notice de l'annuaire du CTHS online
