= Frédéric Millet =

French painter

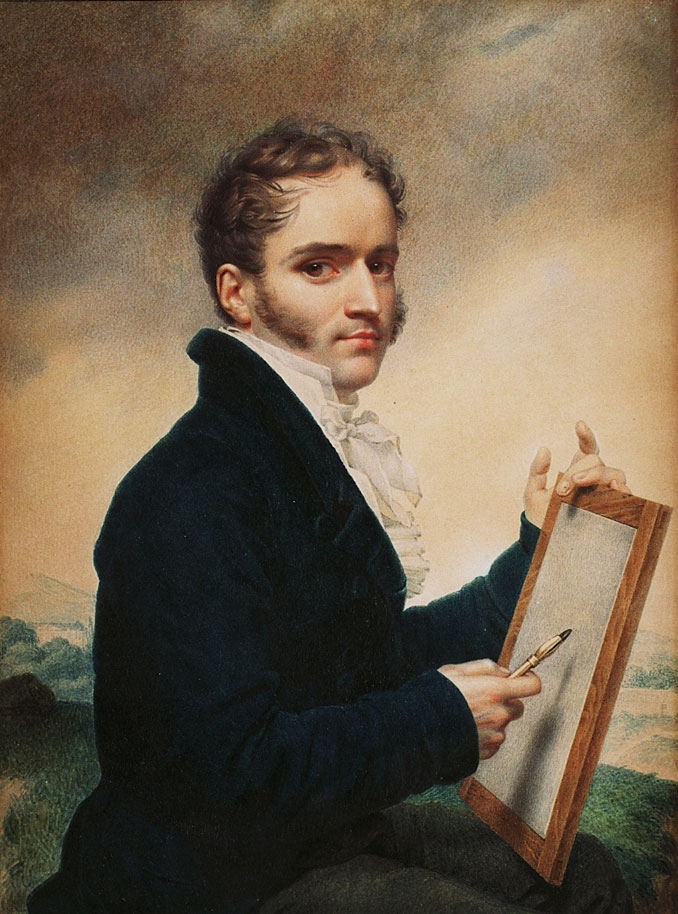
Self-portrait, c. 1817.

Frédéric Millet (French: [fʁedeʁik mijɛ]; 28 July 1786 - 20 October 1859) was a French miniature painter and watercolourist, depicting First French Empire figures such as Anne Charles François de Montmorency, Louis-Alexandre Berthier, Maria Josepha Hermengilde Esterházy, Xavier Leprince, Alexandre du Sommerard, Napoleon's second wife Marie Louise and the Orléans, Bassano and Montebello families. Despite his surname he was not related to the painter Jean-François Millet.

== Life ==
He was born in Charlieu to the joiner Louis Millet and his wife Jeanne-Marie Girard. He studied under Aubry and Isabey and first exhibited at the Paris Salon in 1806. He married Marie-Henriette Rioux (future founder of the 'salles d'asile' in Paris) in 1810 - their children were Émile (1813-1882), Aimé (1819-1891) and Anne (1822-1878). He died at home on Rue d'Amsterdam in Paris.
