= Rue Du Sommerard =

Street in Paris, France

Coordinates: 48°51′01″N 2°20′41″E

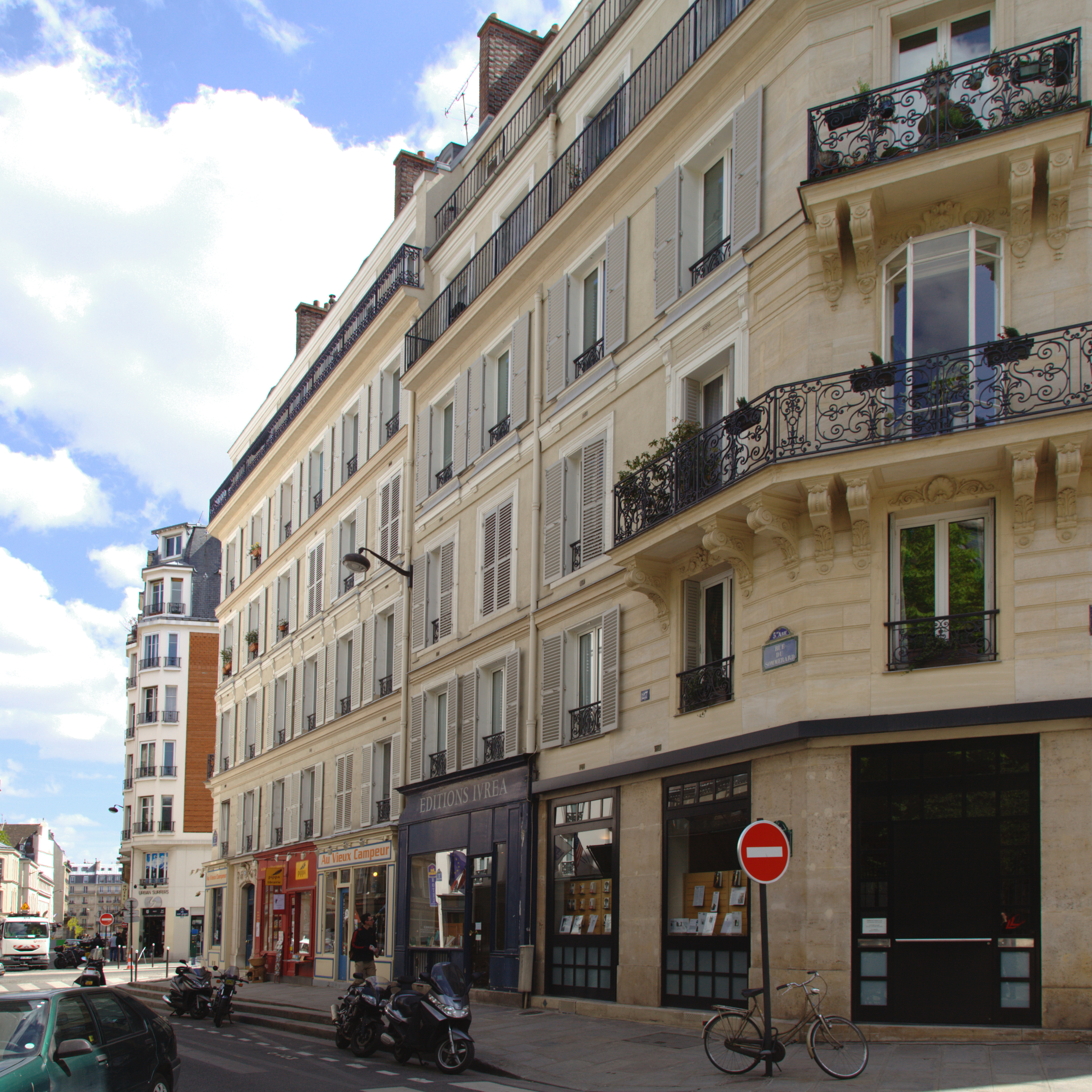
Rue Du Sommerard

The Rue Du Sommerard (French pronunciation: [ʁy dy sɔmʁaʁ]), previously known as the Rue des Mathurins-Saint-Jacques, is a street in the 5th arrondissement of Paris, in the Sorbonne quarter. It is named after archaeologist and art collector Alexandre Du Sommerard.
