= The Unicorns (painting) =

Painting by Gustave Moreau

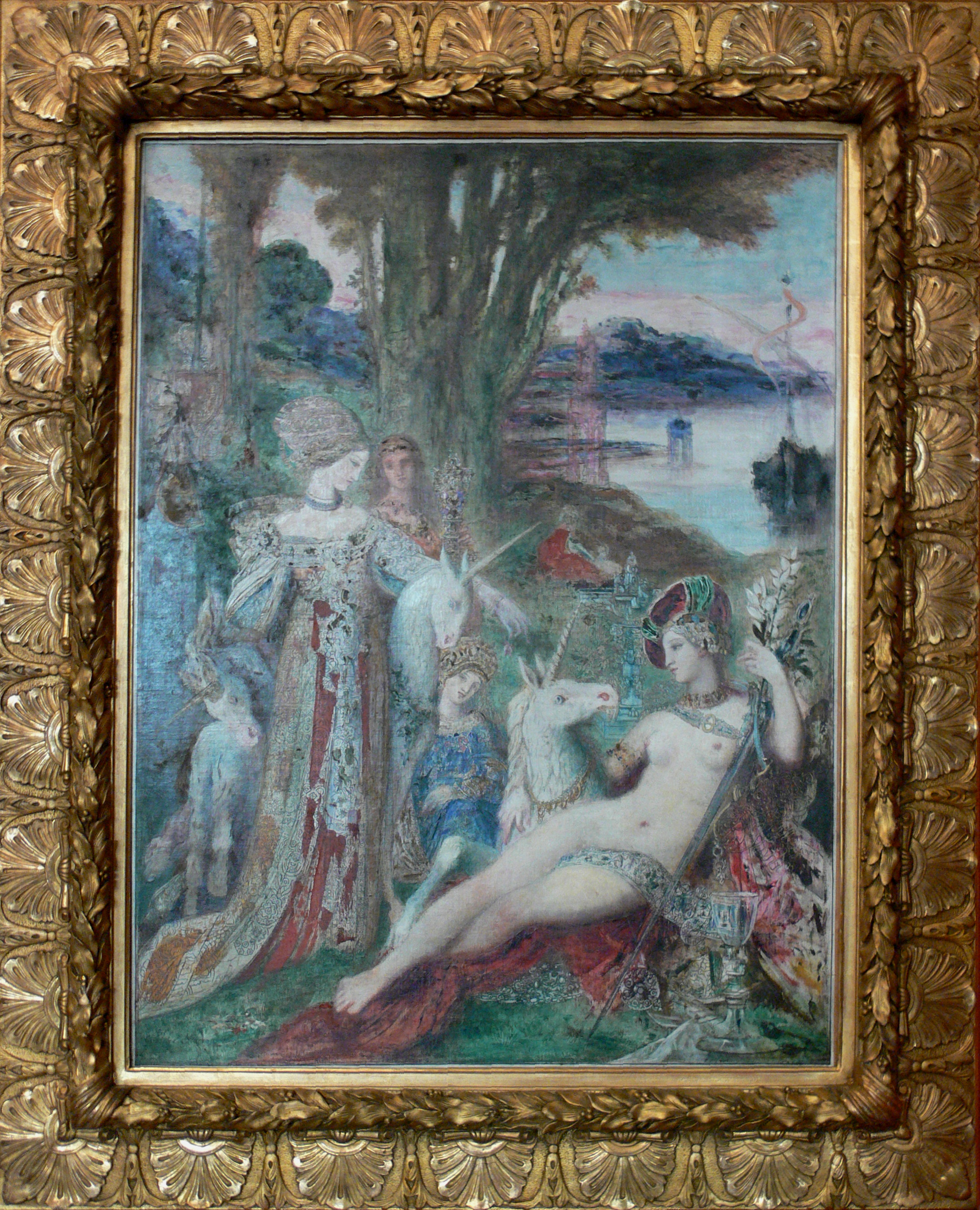
- Artist: Gustave Moreau
- Year: 1880s
- Medium: Oil on canvas
- Dimensions: 115 cm × 90 cm (45 in × 35 in)
- Location: Musée national Gustave Moreau, Paris

The Unicorns is an 1880s oil-on-canvas painting by Gustave Moreau, now in the Musée national Gustave Moreau.

It is freely inspired by The Lady and the Unicorn tapestries in the musée de Cluny Moreau spoke of the painting and its subject as "an enchanted island with a gathering of women, solely of women giving the most precious pretext for all patterns of plastic art".
