= Louis Carolus-Barré =

French librarian and medievalist

Louis Carolus-Barré (9 April 1910, in Paris – 18 July 1993, in Paris) was a 20th-century French librarian and medievalist.

== Biography ==
After studying at the École nationale des chartes of which he graduated in 1934, he was a member of the École française de Rome.

His career as curator of libraries successively led him to the manuscript department of the Bibliothèque nationale de France, in the library of the Institute of France, at the General Secretariat of the French School of Rome, at the CNRS and the library of the Musée du Louvre and that of the Réunion des Musées Nationaux. He also published numerous works devoted to the history of Picardy and the north of the Île-de-France in the Middle Ages. Louis Carolus-Barré was a member of the Société des Antiquaires de France.

His son, Charles Barré, is known as a painter under the name Cebarre.

== Main publications ==
- Les plus anciennes chartes en langue française, tome 1, Problèmes généraux et recueil des pièces originales conservées aux Archives de l'Oise, 1241-1286, Paris, Librairie C. Klincksieck, 1964.
- Études et documents sur l'Île-de-France et la Picardie au Moyen Âge. Tome 1 : Compiègne et le Soissonnais, Ville de Compiègne, 1996.
- Études et documents sur l'Île-de-France et la Picardie au Moyen Âge. Tome 2 : Senlis et le Valois.
- Études et documents sur l'Île-de-France et la Picardie au Moyen Âge. Tome 3 : Beauvaisis et Picardie.
- Le Procès de canonisation de Saint Louis (1272-1297), École française de Rome, 1994 (en collaboration avec le chanoine Henri Platelle).
- Le comté de Valois jusqu'à l'avènement de Philippe de Valois au trône de France : Xe siècle-1328, Société d'histoire et d'archéologie de Senlis, 1998.
- L'ambassade de Philippe de Beaumanoir à Rome (automne 1289), Société d'histoire et d'archéologie de Senlis, 1944.
- Le cardinal de Dormans, chancelier de France, "principal conseiller" de Charles V, d'après son testament et les archives du Vatican, Paris, Éditions de Boccard, 1935.

== Bibliography ==
- Pierre Gasnault, "Obituary : Louis Carolus-Barré (1910–1993)", Bibliothèque de l'École des chartes, vol.152, 2e livraison, July–December 1994, (p. 609–611), Read online.
- François Callais, "In memoriam Louis Carolus-Barré (1910–1993)", Bulletin de la Société historique de Compiègne, vol.33, 1993, (p. 1–5), Read online.
