= François Martroye =

French-Belgian historian (1852–1933)

François Martroye (French: [fʁɑ̃swa maʁtʁwa]; 31 August 1852 – 8 September 1933) was a French-Belgian lawyer and historian of ancient Rome. Martroye wrote widely on the history of the Lower Empire, especially that of North Africa, and the figures of Genseric and Saint Augustine. A vice-president of the Société des Antiquaires de France, he wrote numerous articles in the Memoirs of the society. Born in Ixelles, he died in Paris.

== Works ==
- 1904: L'Occident à l'époque byzantine : Goths et Vandales, 1904
- 1904: Une tentative de révolution sociale en Afrique : donatistes et circoncellions, 1904
- 1907: Genséric : La Conquête vandale en Afrique et la destruction de l'Empire d'Occident, 1907
- 1909: Saint Augustin et le droit d'héritage des églises et des monastères, étude sur les origines du droit des communautés religieuses à la succession des clercs et des moines, 1909
- 1910: De la Date d'une entrée solennelle de Justinien, 1910
- 1911: Saint Augustin et la compétence de la juridiction ecclésiastique au Ve, 1911
- 1914: La Répression du donatisme et la politique religieuse de Constantin et de ses successeurs en Afrique, 1914
- 1919: L'Asile et la législation impériale du IVe au VIe, 1919
- 1919: Procédure dans les actions en revendicaton d'objets volés à propos de l'épître 153 de saint Augustin, 1919
- 1924: Le Testament de saint Grégoire de Nazianze, 1924
- 1926: Notice sur la vie, la carrière et les œuvres du général de division Legrand-Girarde, 1926
- 1928: La Monnaie d'or et les payements dans les caisses publiques à l'époque constantinienne, 1928
- 1928: Les Patronages d'agriculteurs et de vici aux IVe et Ve de notre ère, 1928
- 1930: La Répression de la Magie et le culte des Gentils au IVe, 1930
