= Edmond Du Sommerard =

French museum conservator

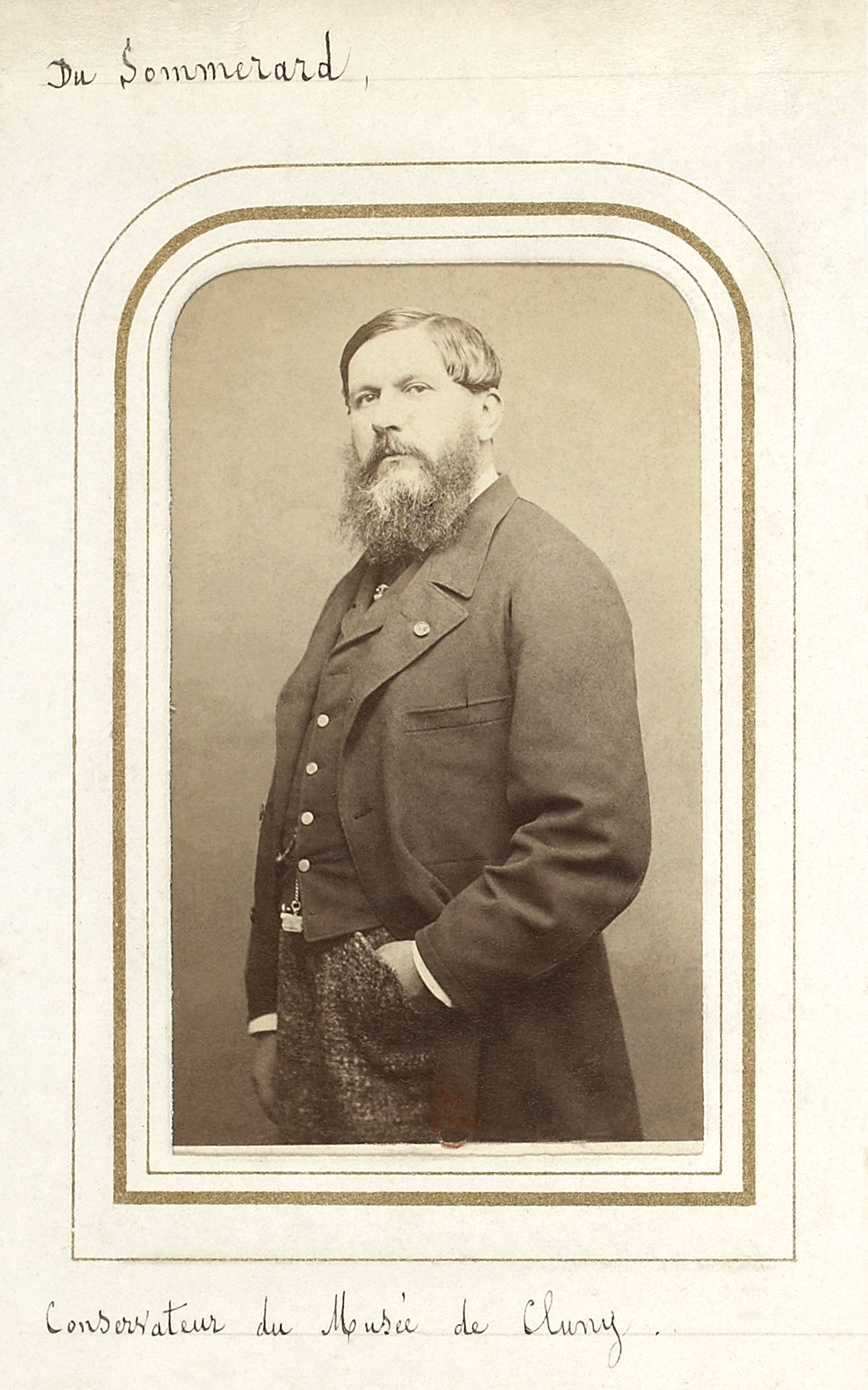
Edmond Du Sommerard; photograph by Étienne Carjat

Edmond Du Sommerard (27 April 1817, Paris - 6 February 1885, Paris) was a French museum conservator.

== Life and work ==
His father, Alexandre Du Sommerard, created what became the Musée de Cluny, and he served as its first curator. As the Commissioner General of expositions from 1871 to 1878, he developed the museum's collection of works from the Middle Ages and Renaissance, increasing it from about 1,400 pieces to over 10,000. His most notable addition was a famous series of six tapestries, known as The Lady and the Unicorn.

He completed his father's work, Arts au moyen âge, en ce qui concerne principalement le Palais romain de Paris, l’Hôtel de Cluny, issu de ses ruines, et les objets d’art de la collection classée dans cet hôtel, which had been left unfinished when he died. On his own, he wrote a Catalogue et description des objets d’art de l’antiquité, du moyen âge et de la Renaissance, exposés au Musée.

He was a member of the Institut de France. In 1882, he was elected to the Académie des Beaux-Arts, where he took Seat #6 in the "Unattached" section; succeeding Charles Blanc (deceased).
