= Jean Babelon =

- Born: 19 January 1889; Paris
- Died: 20 April 1978 (aged 89); Paris
- Occupations: Librarian; Historian; Numismatist.

Jean Babelon (19 January 1889 – 20 April 1978) was a 20th-century French librarian, historian and numismatist.

== Biography ==
A student of the École nationale des chartes, Jean Babelon wrote a thesis entitled La moralité de Bien Advisé et Mal Advisé, précédée d'une étude sur les moralités en général which earned him the degree of archivist paleographer in 1910.

He then joined the Cabinet des médailles of the Bibliothèque nationale de France, then headed by his father. He made his whole career in this institution and led the department between 1937 and 1961.

He was the author of a significant scientific work, primarily in the fields of numismatics (Catalogue de monnaies grecques de la collection de Luynes (4 volumes, 1924-1936), catalogue de la Collection de monnaies et médailles de M. Carlos de Beistegui (1934)) as well as in Spanish art and literature.

He was Ernest Babelon's son and Jean-Pierre Babelon's father.

From 1923 to 1931 he directed with Pierre d'Espezel the review Aréthuse.

Jean Babelon was a member of the Société des Antiquaires de France

== Main works ==
- 1922: Jacopo da Trezzo et la construction de L'Escurial. Essai sur les arts a la cour de Philippe II (1519-1589)
- 1924–1936: Catalogue de monnaies grecques de la collection de Luynes, 4 volumes.
- 1927: La médaille et les médailleurs, Payot, Paris.
- 1934: Catalogue de la Collection de monnaies et médailles de M. Carlos de Beistegui.
- 1942: Le portrait dans l'antiquité d'après les monnaies. Payot.
- 1944: La numismatique antique. Presses universitaires de France.
- 1946: Portraits en médaille. Alpina, Paris.
- 1963: Les monnaies racontent l'histoire.
