= Louis Abel Beffroy de Reigny =

French dramatist and man of letters (1757–1811)

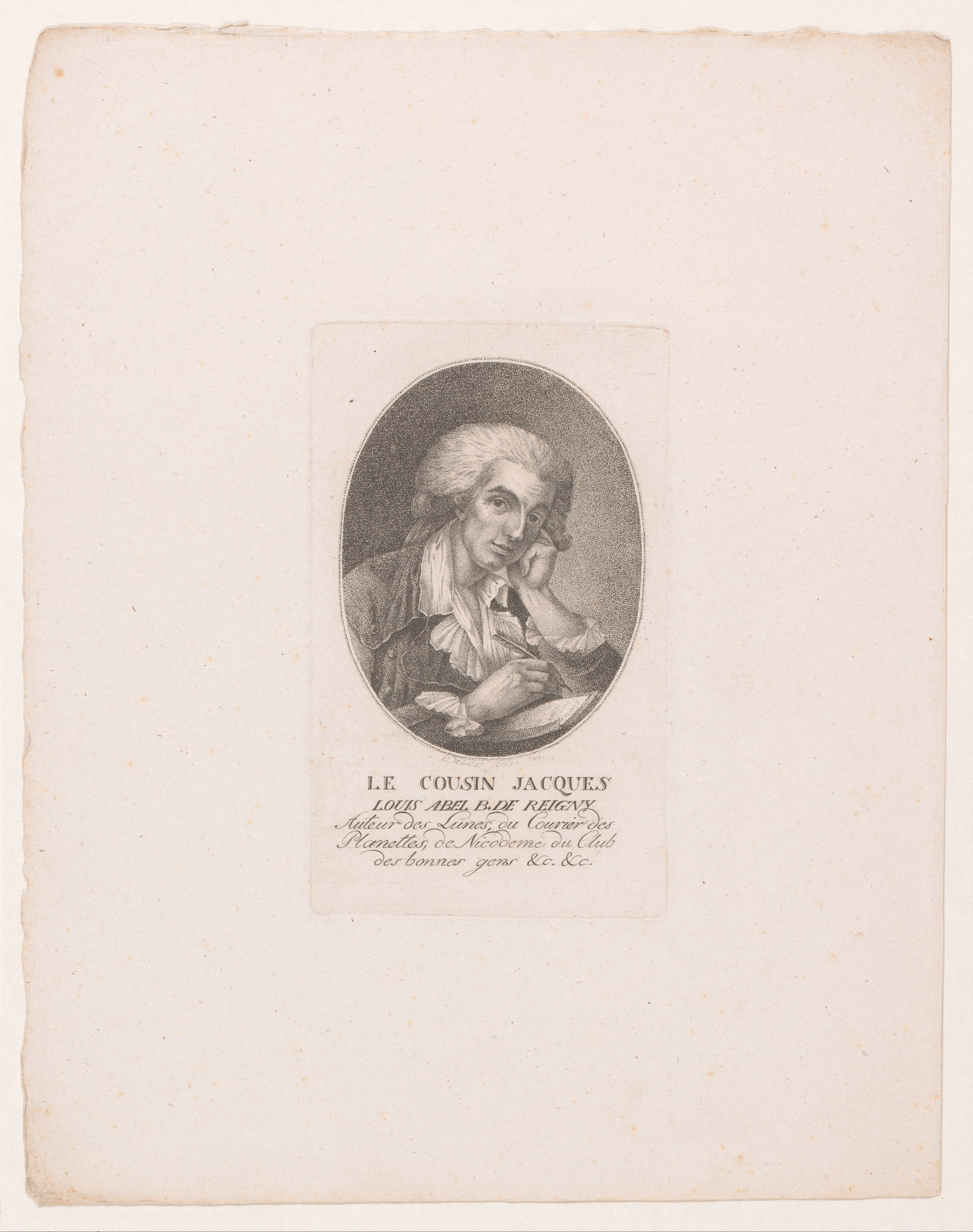
- Born: 6 November 1757; Laon, Aisne.
- Died: 17 December 1811 (aged 54)
- Occupations: Dramatist, man of letters.

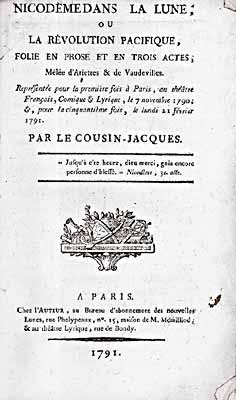
Nicodème dans la Lune. This blockbuster comedy of Jacques Cousin was shown more than 400 times during the Reign of Terror.

Louis Abel Beffroy de Reigny (pronounced [lwi abɛl bɛfʁwa də ʁɛɲi]) (6 November 1757 – 17 December 1811) was a French dramatist and man of letters.

== Life ==
He was born at Laon, Aisne.

Under the name of "Cousin Jacques" he founded a periodical called Les Lunes (1785–1787). The Courrier des planetes ou Correspondance du Cousin Jacques avec le firmament (1788–1792) followed. Nicodeme clans la Lune, ou la révolution pacifique (1790) a three-act farce, is said to have had more than four hundred representations.

In spite of his protests against the evils of the Revolution he escaped interference through the influence of his brother, Louis Etienne Beffroy, who was a member of the Convention.

Of La Petite Nanette (1795) and several other operas he wrote both the words and the music. His Dictionnaire neologique (3 vols, 1795–1800) of the chief actors and events in the Revolution was interdicted by the police and remained incomplete. Beffroy spent his last years in retirement and died in Paris on 17 December 1811.

== Works ==
Theatre

- Compliment 1781. Paris, Théâtre de l'Hôtel de Bourgogne, 16 August 1781.
- Les Ailes de l'amour, comedy in 1 act in verse and in vaudevilles mingled with new songs. Paris, Théâtre Italien (salle Favart), 23 May 1786.
- Les Clefs du jardin, ou les Pots de fleurs, divertissement en vers et en vaudevilles. Paris, Théâtre Italien (salle Favart), 24 March 1787.
- La Fin du bail, ou le Repas des fermiers, divertissement en prose et en vaudevilles. Paris, Théâtre Italien (salle Favart), 8 March 1788.
- Sans adieu, compliment de clôture 1789. Paris, Théâtre Italien (salle Favart), 24 March 1789.
- La Couronne de fleurs, comédie en un acte et en vaudevilles. Paris, Théâtre Italien (salle Favart), 20 April 1789. Text online
- La Confédération du Parnasse. Paris, Théâtre des Beaujolais, 11 July 1790.
- Le Retour du Champ de Mars. Paris, Théâtre des Beaujolais, 25 July 1790.
- Nicodème dans la lune, ou la Révolution pacifique, folie en prose et en 3 actes, mêlée d'ariettes et de vaudevilles. Paris, Théâtre-Français, 7 November 1790. Reprinting: Nizet, Paris, 1983. Text online
- L'Histoire universelle, comédie en vers et en 2 actes, mêlée de vaudevilles et d'airs nouveaux. Paris, Théâtre de Monsieur, 16 December 1790.
- Le Club des bonnes-gens, ou la Réconciliation, comédie en vers et en 2 actes, mêlée de vaudevilles et d'airs nouveaux. Paris, Théâtre de Monsieur, 24 September 1791. Text online
- Les Deux Nicodèmes, ou Les Français sur la planète de Jupiter. Paris, Théâtre Feydeau, 21 November 1791.
- Allons, ça va, ou le Quaker en France, tableau patriotique en vers et en 1 acte. Paris, Théâtre Feydeau, 28 October 1793. Text online
- Toute la Grèce, ou Ce que peut la liberté, tableau patriotique en un acte. Paris, Théâtre de la Porte-Saint-Martin, 5 January 1794. Text online
- Le Compère Luc ou Les Dangers de l'ivrognerie. Paris, Théâtre Feydeau, 19 February 1794.
- La Petite Nannette, opéra-comique en 2 actes. Paris, Théâtre Feydeau, 7 December 1796.
- Turlututu, empereur de l'Isle verte, folie, bêtise, farce ou parade, comme on voudra, en prose et en 3 actes. Paris, Théâtre de la Cité, 3 July 1797.
- Jean-Baptiste, opéra comique en prose et en 1 acte. Paris, Théâtre Feydeau, 1 June 1798.
- Un Rien, ou l'Habit de noces, folie épisodique en 1 acte et en prose, mêlée de vaudevilles et d'airs nouveaux. Paris, Théâtre de l'Ambigu-Comique, 7 June 1798.
- Le Grand Genre. Paris, Théâtre de l'Ambigu-Comique, 13 January 1799.
- Magdelon, comédie épisodique en prose et en 1 acte, mêlée d'ariettes. Paris, Théâtre Montansier, 4 June 1799.
- Émilie ou Les Caprices, comédie en vers et en 3 actes. Paris, Théâtre des Jeunes-Artistes, 9 July 1799.
- Les Deux Charbonniers, ou Les Contrastes, comédie en prose et en 2 actes mêlée d'ariettes. Paris, Théâtre Montansier, 24 August 1799.
- Le Bonhomme, ou Poulot et Fanchon. Paris, Théâtre Montansier, 11 December 1799.

Poetry

- Les Petites Poésies d'Antoine Jacques, citoyen de la place Maubert (1782)
- Turlututu, ou la Science du bonheur, poème héroï-comique en vers et en huit chants, par le Cousin Jacques (1783)
- Hurluberlu, ou le Célibataire, poème demi-burlesque avec des airs nouveaux, en vers et en trois chants, par le Cousin Jacques, avec des notes de M. de Kerkorkurkayladeck (1783)
- Marlborough, poëme comique en prose rimée, par le Cousin-Jacques, avec des notes de M. de Kerkorkurkayladeck, gentilhomme bas-breton (1783)
- Les Petites-Maisons du Parnasse, ouvrage comico-littéraire d'un genre nouveau, en vers et en prose, par le Cousin Jacques, traduit de l'arabe, etc., et donné au public par un drôle de corps, avec des notes de Messire Ives de Kerkorkurkaïladek-Kakabek, seigneur de Konkalek, Kikokikar, et autres lieux (1783–84)
- Nouveau Te Deum en vers saphiques, avec des notes sur le Pape, sur le légal, sur le nouvel archevêque de Paris, sur les philosophes (1802)
- Les Soirées chantantes, ou le Chansonnier bourgeois, formé du choix de tous les vaudevilles, couplets, romances, rondes, scènes chantantes du Cousin-Jacques, recueil revu, épuré par l'auteur, avec les airs nouveaux notés (1803)

Journalism and other

- Le Cousin Jacques hors du Sallon, folie sans conséquence, à l'occasion des tableaux exposés au Louvre en 1787 (1787)
- Histoire de France pendant trois mois, ou Relation exacte, impartiale et suivie des événemens qui ont eu lieu à Paris, à Versailles et dans les provinces, depuis le 15 mai jusqu'au 15 août 1789, avec des anecdotes qui n'ont point encore été publiées et des réflexions sur l'état actuel de la France, et suivie d'une épître en vers à Louis XVI (1789)
- Précis exact de la prise de la Bastille rédigé sous les yeux des principaux acteurs qui ont joué un rôle dans cette expédition et lu le même jour à l'Hôtel-de-Ville (1789)
- Supplément nécessaire au Précis exact de la prise de la Bastille, avec des anecdotes curieuses sur le même sujet (1789). Text online
- Les Repentirs de l'année 1788, suivis de douze petites lettres, écrites a qui voudra les lire (1789)
- Le Lendemain, ou l'Esprit des feuilles de la veille (10 October 1790 - 19 June 1791).
- Les Lunes du Cousin Jacques (1785–1787). Text online
- Courrier des planètes, ou Correspondance du Cousin Jacques avec le firmament, folie périodique dédiée à la Lune (1788–1790)
- Les Nouvelles Lunes du Cousin Jacques (1791)
- Almanach général de tous les spectacles de Paris et des provinces pour l'année 1791 [et 1792] par une société de gens de lettres et d'artistes (2 volumes, in collaboration, 1792–93)
- Ah ! sauvons la France, puisqu'on le peut encore, ou Plan de finances, simple, facile, prompt et moral dans son exécution, soumis à l'opinion publique par un citoyen de Paris, qui veut garder l'anonyme (1793). Text online
- La Constitution de la Lune, rêve politique et moral, par le Cousin-Jacques (1793). Text online
- Testament d'un électeur de Paris (1795)
- Dictionnaire néologique des hommes et des choses, ou Notice alphabétique des personnes des deux sexes, des événements, des découvertes et des mots qui ont paru le plus remarquables à l'auteur, dans tout le cours de la Révolution française, par le Cousin-Jacques (3 volumes, 1799)

== Bibliography ==
- Charles Westercamp, Beffroy de Reigny dit le Cousin Jacques, 1757-1811. Sa vie et ses Œuvres, Tablettes de l’Aisne, Laon, 1930.
