= Alexandre Du Sommerard =

French archaeologist and art collector

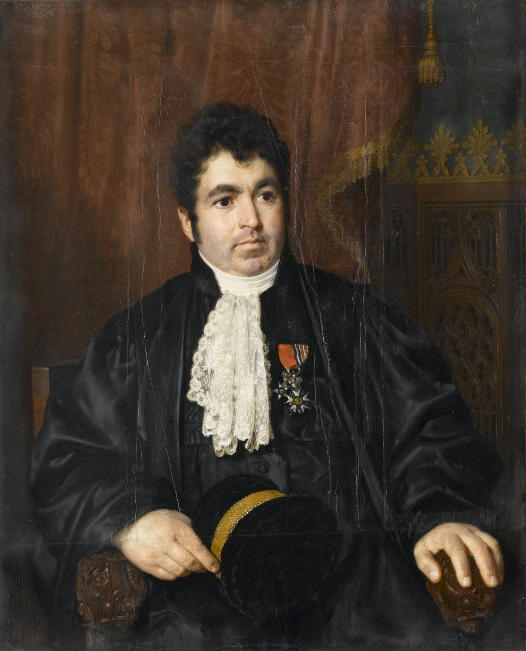
Frédéric Millet, portrait of Alexandre du Sommerard, 1827, Musée de Cluny.

Alexandre Du Sommerard (French pronunciation: [alɛksɑ̃dʁ dy sɔmʁaʁ]; 31 August 1779, in Bar-sur-Aube – 19 August 1842, in Paris) was a French archaeologist and art collector.

== Life ==
He volunteered for the army at 14 and took part in the French Revolutionary Wars. Returning to civil life, he became attached to the Cour des comptes, at first as a référendaire, then as a conseiller-maître, spending all his leisure time and most of his modest fortune on collecting, classifying and publishing a collection of medieval and Renaissance art objects.

Each day, his cabinet of furniture, vases and utensils of all kinds which he saved from their destroyers, since for a long while he was almost the only person in Paris collecting these curiosities that were later so much studied. Little by little he gained imitators and, always ready to reply to questions of taste and even enquiries from the indiscrete curious, Du Sommerard welcomed people to see his collection and gave lessons in practical archaeology.

The hôtel de Cluny, a Gothic palace built in the late 15th century by Jacques d'Amboise and the only surviving medieval palace in Paris, owes its survival to Du Sommerard. He took it over as a home and as a place to house his collection. On his death the Musée d'antiquités nationales that he created was acquired by the French state and his son, Edmond was chosen to be its first curator. The Rue des Mathurins was renamed Rue du Sommerard in his honour.

== Works ==
- Vues de Provins, dessinées et lithographiées, en 1822, par plusieurs artistes, avec un texte par M. D., Paris: chez Gide, 1822.
- "Notice Nécrologique sur M. Xavier Leprince, Peintre de genre, mort à Nice le 26 décembre 1826", Journal des artistes, 28 January 1827, pp. 56–58.
- Notices sur l'hôtel de Cluny et le palais des Thermes, 1834.
- Les Arts au Moyen Âge, folio and 5 volumes of text, 1842–1846; a large work on medieval art, the summation of his travels, long studies, and wide reading, which he worked on until his death.

== Sources ==
- Prosper Mérimée, Notice sur la vie et les travaux d'Alexandre Du Sommerard, Fondateur des collections de l'Hôtel de Cluny, Paris, Hôtel de Cluny, 1883.
