= Jacques Cambry =

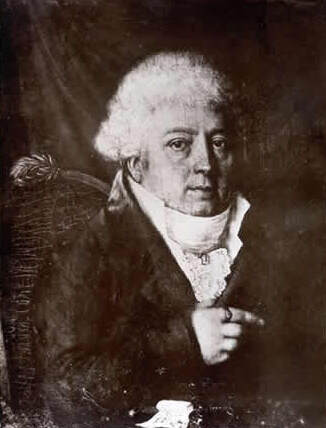
- Born: 2 October 1749; Lorient, France
- Died: 31 December 1807 (aged 58); Cachan, France
- Occupations: Writer, government official

Jacques Cambry (2 October 1749 – 31 December 1807) was a Breton writer and expert in Celtic France. An early proponent of what came to be called Celtomania, he was the founder of the Celtic Academy, the forerunner of the Societé des Antiquaires de France. In addition, he is still honored as the "inventor" of the Oise département and praised for his contributions to the regional Breton identity as well as the national identity of post-Revolutionary France.

== Biography ==
Cambry, the son of a naval engineer, was born in Lorient, Brittany. He embraced the French Revolution, and was appointed to various governmental positions, including district attorney for the Lorient commune in 1792. In 1794 he became Commissioner for Science and Arts and embarked upon a journey in Brittany to visit the depots of confiscated nobility properties and the monasteries, which he published a report about in 1799. In 1799 he was appointed administrator of the Department of the Seine. On 2 March 1800, he was installed as prefect of the newly established département the Oise by Napoleon, and engaged himself deeply not just in administrative but also in cultural, archeological, and historical matters; when he left office, on 16 May 1802, he had given the new département a sense of unity and had convinced its inhabitants that they had a history they should be proud of. He was the first president of the académie celtique which he cofounded in 1804 with the philologist Éloi Johanneau and the diplomat Michel-Ange Mangourit. The académie held its inaugural session on 30 March 1805 and subsequently reinvented itself as the Société des Antiquaires. He remained president until his death in 1807. Considered a true Enlightenment man, he is praised as well for his service to the national construction of France.

== Publications and interests ==
Cambry published on historical and archeological topics. His Voyage dans le Finistère (1799) proved to be an important late-eighteenth century text exemplifying the concept of the sublime, as well as foreshadowing the movement in the nineteenth century that came to be known as Celtomania. It contains an early description of the Finistère département in Brittany, and was "hugely influential," and the book's heavily romantic and idealized description of, for instance, the Pointe du Raz became the inspiration for other writers describing the place in the following years. The book likewise greatly promoted travel to the area. While the book was originally intended as little more than an inventory of art objects that had escaped vandalism, it became much more than that; French historian Alain Corbin qualified Cambry's prose as an "emotional mapping of the sea-shore" and refers to Cambry's jubilant evocations of moments of sublimity as "in the manner of Ossian's disciples."

His Monumens celtiques, ou recherches sur le culte des pierres (1805) is especially notable as an important work on Celtic monuments and megaliths in France and on druidism in general; Cambry dedicated the book to Napoleon, and "promoted a nationalist view of Breton megalithic monuments."

Cambry also wrote on art, and published an essay on the painter Nicolas Poussin.

As the former administrator of the Seine, he submitted a proposal to turn the quarries of Montmartre into a cemetery, a plan which was never executed. His 1799 Rapport sur les sépultures accompanied the design by architect Jacques Molinos, and was inspired by an essay competition proposed a few years before by the National Institute of Sciences and Arts on how to deal with burial in post-Revolutionary France. The cemetery was designed as a circle, with a central temple containing a crematorium and a repository for urns.

=== List of Publications ===
- Traces du Magnétisme. The Hague: 1784.
- Contes et proverbes, suivis d'une notice sur les troubadours. Amsterdam: 1784 (repr. 1787).
  - Small collection of anecdotes drawn from Claude Fauchet, Étienne Pasquier, Nostradamus, Jean-Baptiste de La Curne de Sainte-Palaye, and others.
- Promenades d'Automne en Angleterre. 1787.
- Catalogue des objets échappés au vandalisme. 1795.
- Rapport sur les sépultures, présenté à l'administration centrale du département de la Seine, par le citoyen Cambry. Paris: Pierre Didot l'Aîné, an VII 1799.
  - Remarking on the disastrous condition of many cemeteries at the end of the French Revolution, Cambry proposes a far-reaching effort to renew the way in which burials take place: "Respect for the dead, much more than one thinks, contributes to social well-being."
- Essai sur la vie et sur les tableaux du Poussin, Pierre Didot l'Aîné, an VII. 1799.
- Voyage dans le Finistère ou État de ce département en 1794 et 1795. Imprimerie-Librairie du Cercle Social, an VII 1799.
  - Originally conceived as a report on the state of the département, it describes its condition shortly after the French Revolution.
- Voyage Pittoresque en Suisse et en Italie. Paris: Jansen, an IX (1801).
- Description du département de l'Oise en deux volumes. Imprimerie de P. Didot L'ainé, an XI. 1803.
- Monumens celtiques, ou recherches sur le culte des pierres, Précédées d'une Notice sur les Celtes et sur les Druites, et suivies d'Étymologies celtiques, Paris: chez Mad. Johanneau, Libraire, Palais du Tribunat, an XIII 1805.
