= Louis Demaison =

French historiographer and archaeologist (1852–1937)

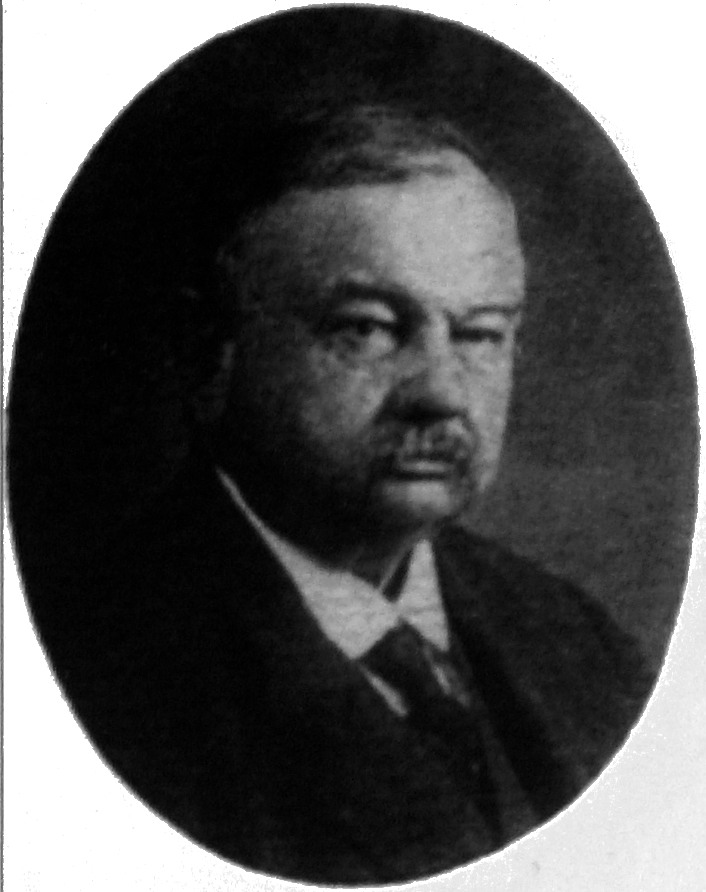
- Born: 5 November 1852; Reims
- Died: 5 May 1937 (aged 84); Paris
- Occupations: Historiographer; Archaeologist
- Spouse: Marie Poultier (1862–1948)

Louis Demaison (5 November 1852 – 5 May 1937) was a 19th–20th-century French historiographer, archaeologist, and with Henri Jadart, one of the most significant contributors to the nineteenth/twentieth history of the Marne department.

== Biography ==
Louis Demaison was the grandson of Louis Joseph Demaison-Henriot (1796–1856), a trader who was mayor of Reims in 1837 and 1838 and Sophie Henriot whom he married in 1821.

He began his studies in law and after obtaining his license he followed the courses of Gabriel Monod, Gaston Paris and Darmester at the École pratique des hautes études. An historian graduated from the École Nationale des Chartes in 1876 as palaeographer archivist, he led a parallel administrative career and a career in research with numerous publications alone or with others, including Henry Jadart and Charles Feodor Givelet. A student of Lefèvre Pontalis, he was also an outstanding historian of art and architecture.

He began his career as an archivist of the city of Reims in 1876 and remained in office until his retirement in 1913.

He was a member of numerous scientific societies and academies both national and local, including the Académie des Inscriptions et Belles-Lettres and the Société française d'archéologie, of which he became inspector in 1903. At its foundation in 1879, he was appointed by the Ministry of Education, a member of the Archaeological Commission responsible for ensuring conservation in France of the "monuments de l'art et de l'histoire" with Henri Jadart and Charles Givelet. A president of the Académie Nationale de Reims from 1914 to 1919, he was also a member of the "Comité des travaux historiques et scientifiques" and of the Société des Antiquaires de France. He was also interested in the history of the Reims Cathedral, a monument to which he devoted a reference book.

== Honours ==
- 1888 - Prix La Grange of the Académie des Inscriptions et Belles-Lettres
- 1912 - First medal of the antiques contest of France- Académie des Inscriptions et Belles-Lettres
- 1902 and 1911 - Grandes vermeil medals of the Société française d'archéologie
- Chevalier of the Légion d'honneur

== Books (partial list) ==
- 1873: Des privilèges sur les immeubles, Pourcelle-Florez, Paris.
- 1887: Aymeri de Narbonne : chanson de geste publiée d’après les ms. de Londres et de Paris, Paris : Firmin-Didot, 2 vol.
- 1895: with Charles Givelet, in collab. with Henri Jadart – Exposition rétrospective de Reims. Catalogue du Musée lapidaire rémois, établi dans la chapelle basse de l’archevêché (1865- 1895). Reims : Académie de Reims.
- 1901: Lieu du baptême de Clovis, E. Colin, Lagny.
- 1909: Catalogue général des manuscrits des bibliothèques publiques de France. Reims, Paris, Plon, T. XXXIX bis
- 1911: in collaboration with Henri Jadart and Charles Givelet, Département de la Marne. Répertoire archéologique de l’arrondissement de Reims, Louis Michaud, Reims, Académie de Reims. Entre 1885 et 1900, publication de ce titre en 4 vol. Collab. d’Henri Jadart et Charles Givelet.
- 1913: La cathédrale de Reims, Ed. Henri Laurens, Paris, several editions.
- 1916: L’Art de la Champagne, région de Reims, L. de Boccard, Paris.
- 1924: Les Incendies de Reims au Moyen Âge, Matot-Braine, Reims.
- 1925: Reims à la fin du XIIe d’après la vie de saint Albert, évêque de Liège, Monce, Reims.

== Articles (partial list) ==
- 1881 Les Portes antiques de Reims et la captivité d’Ogier le Danois. Travaux de l’Académie de Reims, vol. 71, (p. 433–458).
- 1881–1882: La Mosaïque de Nennig. Travaux de l’Académie de Reims, vol. 71, (p. 279–287)
- 1882–1883: Documents inédits sur une assemblée d’État convoquée à Amiens en 1424. Travaux de l’Académie nationale de Reims, vol. 73, (p. 100–115).
- 1894: Les Architectes de la cathédrale de Reims in Bulletin archéologique du Comité des travaux historiques et scientifiques, (p. 3–40).
- 1899: Les Chevets des églises Notre-Dame de Châlons et Saint-Remi de Reims in Bulletin archéologique du Comité des travaux historiques et scientifiques, (p. 84–107).
- 1898: Les Inscriptions commémoratives de la construction d’églises dans la région rémoise et ardennaise, Bulletin monumental, vol. 63, (p. 189–219).
- 1907: Le Plan d’une monographie d’église et le vocabulaire archéologique, Bulletin monumental, vol. 71, (p. 351–360).
- 1911–1912: Monuments religieux : cathédrale. Congrès archéologique de France, Reims, t. I, (p. 39–50).
- 1911–1912: Palais archiépiscopal. Congrès archéologique de France, Reims, t. I, (p. 50–53).
- 1911–1912: Cloître. Congrès archéologique de France, Reims, t. I, (p. 53–54).
- 1911–1912: Châlons, Monuments religieux, cathédrale Saint-Étienne. Congrès archéologique de France, Reims, t. I, {(p. 447–473).
- 1911–1912:Châlons, église Saint-Alpin. Congrès archéologique de France, Reims, t. I, (p. 496–502).
- 1911–1912: Châlons, église Saint-Jacques. Congrès archéologique de France, Reims, t. I,(p. 502–508).
- 1911–1912: Châlons, église Saint-Loup. Congrès archéologique de France, Reims, t. I, (p. 508–512).
