= Philippe Contamine =

French historian (1932–2022)

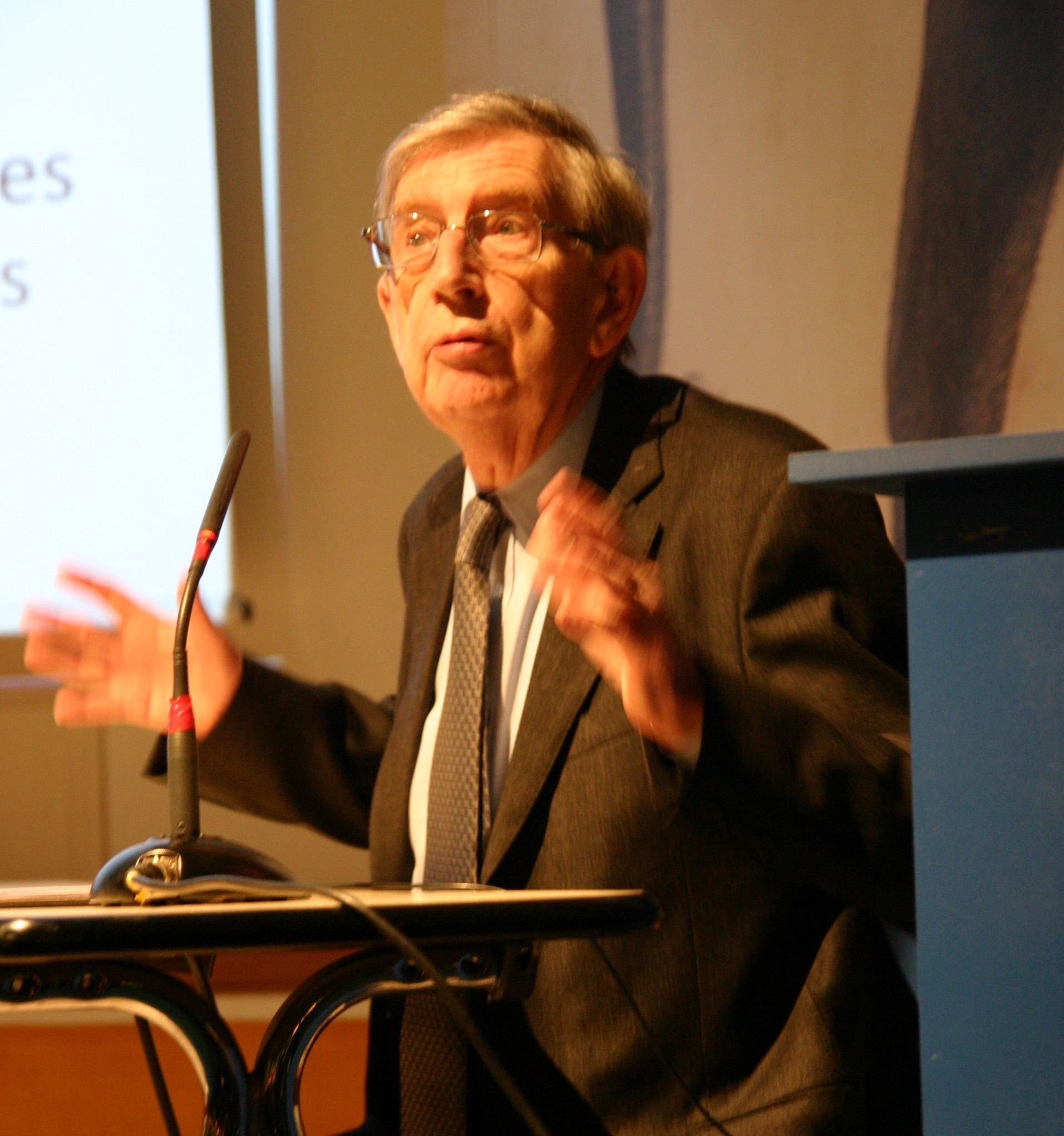
- Philippe Contamine in 2016
- Born: 7 May 1932; Metz, France
- Died: 26 January 2022 (aged 89); 14th arrondissement of Paris, France
- Education: Lycée Hoche
- Alma mater: University of Paris

Philippe Contamine (7 May 1932 – 26 January 2022) was a French historian of the Middle Ages who specialised in military history and the history of the nobility.

== Life ==
Contamine was a president of the Académie des Inscriptions et Belles-Lettres, the Société de l'histoire de France, and the Societé des Antiquaires de France. He taught at the Université de Nancy, the Paris Nanterre University at Nanterre and Paris-Sorbonne University.

He was an officer of the Legion of Honour and a fellow of the Royal Historical Society.

He died on 26 January 2022, at the age of 89.

== Select bibliography ==
- Guerre, État et Société à la Fin du Moyen Âge. Études sur les armées des rois de France, 1337-1494 (doctoral thesis, Paris, 1972)
- La Guerre au Moyen-Âge (1980)
- La France et l'Angleterre pendant la guerre de Cent Ans, (Hachette, 1982).
- Guerre et Société en France, en Angleterre et en Bourgogne XIVe et XVe siècles (Lille, 1991)
- Histoire Militaire de la France vol.1 (Paris, 1992)
- 'The Soldiery in Late Medieval Society', in French History 8 (1994)
- La noblesse au royaume de France, de Philippe le Bel à Louis XII (1997)
- Histoire de la France politique. I, Le Moyen Âge, 481-1514, le roi, l'Église, les grands, le peuple (2002)
