= Éloi Johanneau =

French philologist (1770–1851)

Éloi Johanneau (2 October 1770 – 24 July 1851) was a French philologist.
