= Ernest Babelon =

French numismatist and archaeologist

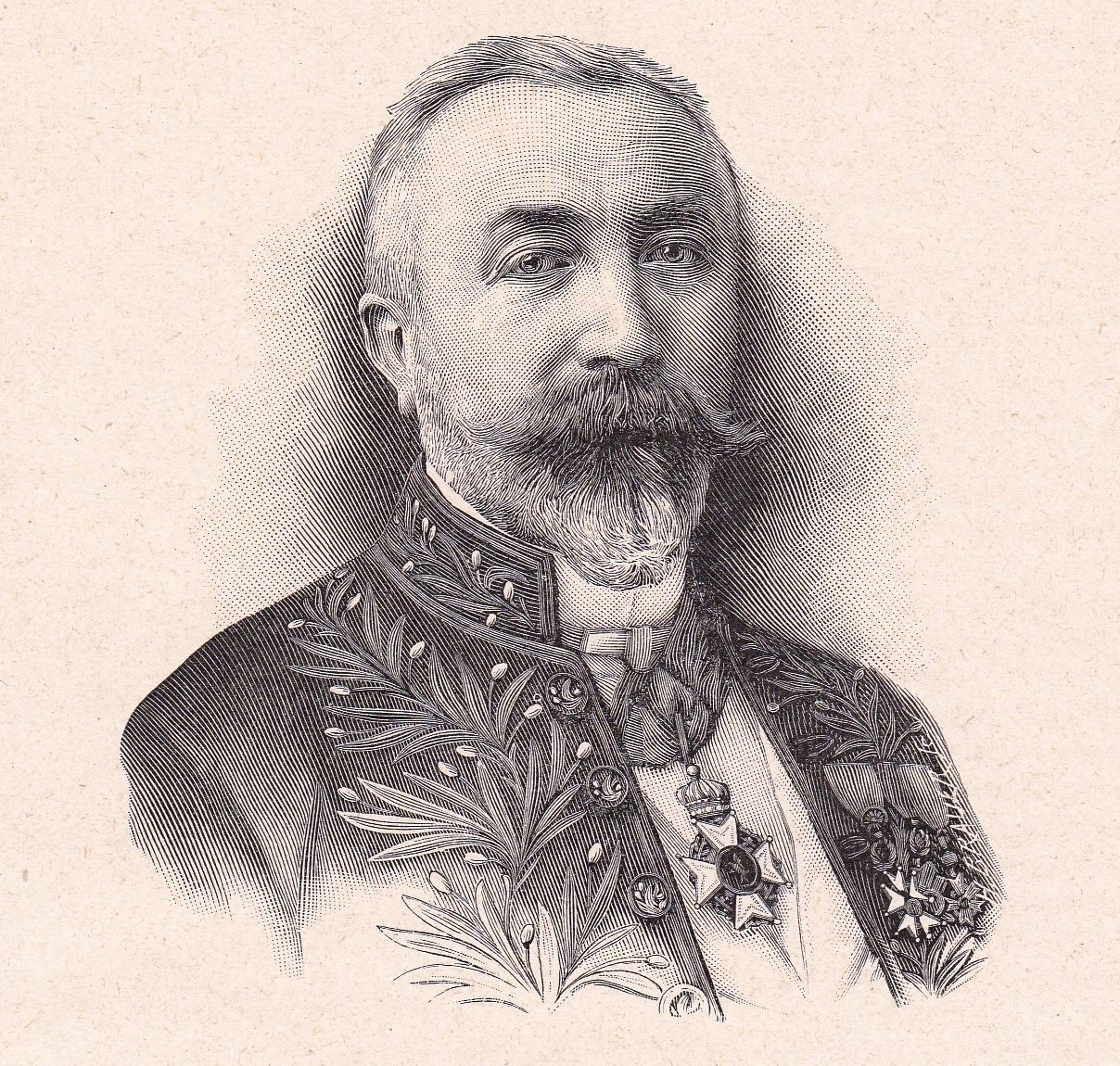
Ernest Babelon

Ernest Charles François Babelon (born 7 November 1854 in Sarrey, Département Haute-Marne; died 3 January 1924 in Paris) was a French numismatist and classical archaeologist.

== Education and career ==
Ernest Babelon trained from 1874 to 1878 to be an archivist at the École Nationale des Chartes. He wrote his thesis on Les bourgeois du roi au Moyen Âge. From 1878 he worked for the Cabinet des Médailles. With Salomon Reinach he led excavations in North Africa in 1883. In 1890 he was appointed Deputy to the Director of the Cabinet des Médailles, Henri Michel Lavoix; two years later he was himself appointed Director of the museum and he remained in that position for 32 years, until his death in 1924. His successor was Adolphe Dieudonné. During the First World War he was responsible for sending the artistic treasures of the museum away for safekeeping and for gathering them back after the war. In 1902 he received an additional appointment as Lecturer for Numismatics and Glyptics, in 1908 he was appointed Professor with the chair for the Cours de numismatique antique et médiévale (course in ancient and medieval numismatics) at the Collège de France. That same year he was also appointed President of the Académie des Inscriptions et Belles-Lettres. His son Jean Babelon was also Director of the Cabinet des Médailles.

Babelon devoted himself initially to Medieval studies. His interest soon expanded to ancient numismatics, where he became a respected expert. In addition he was also a specialist in Ancient Near Eastern languages, working closely with his friend François Lenormant. Babelon became a central figure in French archaeology. He sat on several important committees and was co-editor of the Gazette archéologique. His numismatic work had two focuses: on the one hand he wrote numismatic catalogues and on the other he wrote syntheses of his individual studies in comprehensive works. His handbook Traité des monnaies grecques et romaines (Account of Greek and Roman Coinage) remained incomplete, he planned an account of all numismatic knowledge of his time based on the collection of William Henry Waddington. His corpus Recueil général des monnaies grecques d’Asie mineure (General Record of the Greek Coinage of Asia Minor), produced with Théodore Reinach, in which he synthesised all the mints of Asia Minor also remains incomplete. To this day the work is important to scholarship because of its comprehensiveness.

At the end of the First World War he intervened in the political discourse about the Saargebiet with a two volume work about Rome and the Germans called Le Rhin dans l'histoire. (The Rhine in History). He was one of the leaders of the Comité d’études which existed from 1917 to 1918 and advanced the argument for the Saar belonging to France. Following the work of Paul Vidal de la Blache, he favoured a military protectorate, but misquoted Paul Vidal de la Blache.

== Awards ==
Babelon was esteemed and honoured many times. For his service to the Cabinet des Médailles he was made a Knight of the Legion of Honour. In 1899 he was recognised with the Medal of the Royal Numismatic Society and in 1922 with the Archer M. Huntington Medal.

== Publications (selected) ==
- Monnaies de la Republique Romaine (Coinage of the Roman Republic). 2 Vols. Paris, 1885.
- Les monnaies d'or d'Athènes (The Gold Coinage of Athens) Rev. des Etudes grecques, 1889, I. 187.
- Les Rois de Syrie, d’Arménie, et de Commagène. Catlogue de monnaies grecques de la Bibliothèque Nationale. (The Kings of Syria, Armenia and Commagene. Catalogue of the Greek Coins of the Bibliothèque Nationale) Paris, 1890.
- Les Perses Achéménides (The Achaemenid Persians). Paris, 1893.
- Carthage. Ernest Leroux, Paris 1896.
- La collection Waddington au cabinet des médailles (The Waddington Collection in the Cabinet des Médailles). RN.Paris, 1897-1898.
- Numismatique d'Edessa (Numismatics of Edessa). Paris, 1904. link
- Traité des monnaies grecques et romaines. (Account of Greek and Roman Coinage) 11 Volumes. Leroux, Paris 1901–1933.
- Recueil général des monnaies grecques d’Asie mineure (General Record of the Greek Coinage of Asia Minor), began by William Henry Waddington; continued and completed by Ernest Babelon and Théodore Reinach. Leroux, Paris 1908–1925. link
- Le Rhin dans l'histoire. (The Rhine in History) Leroux, Paris 1916–1917.
  - Bd. 1: L'antiquité: Gaulois et Germains. (Antiquity: Gauls and Germani) 1916.
  - Bd. 2: Les Francs de l'Est: Français et Allemands. (The Franks and the East: French and Germans) 1917.

See also L' Oeuvre numismatique d'Ernest Babelon, by A. Dieudonné (Paris : Feuardent Frères, 1924)

== Bibliography ==
- Helmut Schubert. Babelon, Ernest. in Peter Kuhlmann, Helmuth Schneider (Ed.): Geschichte der Altertumswissenschaften. Biographisches Lexikon (= Der Neue Pauly. Supplement Vol. 6). Metzler, Stuttgart. 2012, ISBN 978-3-476-02033-8, pp. 41–42.

Preceded by Henri Michel Lavoix	Director of the Cabinet des Médailles; 1892-1924	Succeeded by Adolphe Dieudonné
