= Locunolé =

Locunolé Lokunole
- Commune
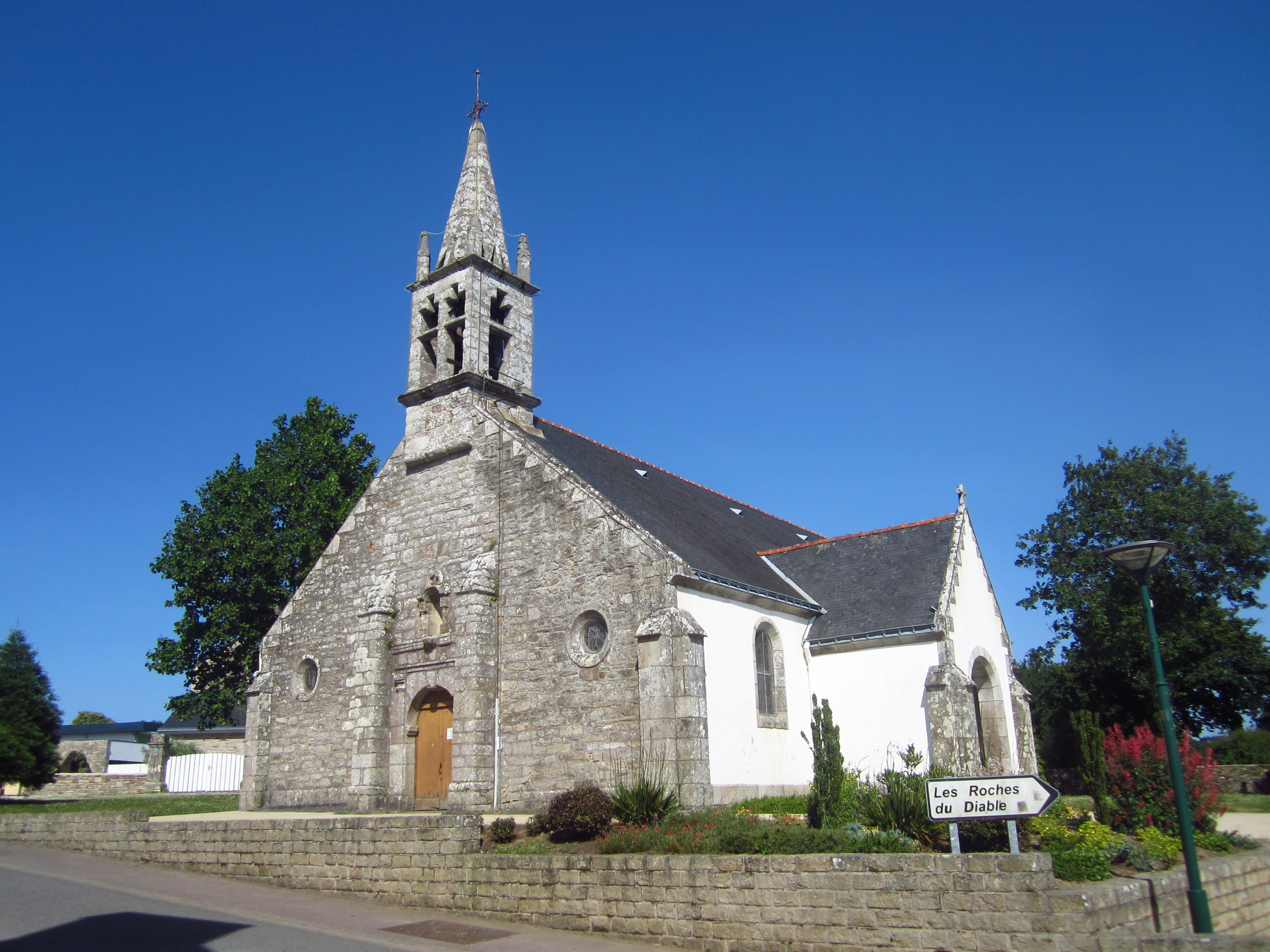
- The church of Saint-Guénolé
- Location of Locunolé
- Location within France Location within Brittany
- Coordinates: 47°56′13″N 3°28′38″W
- Country: France
- Region: Brittany
- Department: Finistère
- Arrondissement: Quimper
- Canton: Quimperlé
- Intercommunality: CA Quimperlé Communauté

Government
  - Mayor (2020–2026): Corinne Collet
- Area^{1}: 16.78 km^{2} (6.48 sq mi)
- Highest elevation: 121 m (397 ft)
- Lowest elevation: 12 m (39 ft)
- Population (2023): 1,177
  - Density: 70.14/km^{2} (181.7/sq mi)
- Time zone: UTC+01:00 (CET)
  - Summer (DST): UTC+02:00 (CEST)
- INSEE/Postal code: 29136 /29310
- ^{1} French Land Register data, which excludes lakes, ponds, glaciers > 1 km^{2} (0.386 sq mi or 247 acres) and river estuaries.

Locunolé (French pronunciation: [lɔkynɔle]; Breton: Lokunole) is a commune in the Finistère department of Brittany in north-western France.

== Toponymy ==
From the Breton loc which means hermitage and 'unolé' which derive from Saint Guénolé.

== Geography ==
The village centre is located 9 km (5.6 mi) north-east of Quimperlé. The river Ellé forms the eastern border of the commune.

=== Neighbouring communes ===
Locunolé is border by Guilligomarc'h to east, by Arzano to south, by Tréméven to west and by Querrien to north.

== Population ==
Inhabitants of Locunolé are called in French Locunolois.

Historical population

| Year | Pop. | ±% p.a. |
|---|---|---|
| 1793 | 598 | — |
| 1800 | 422 | −4.86% |
| 1806 | 412 | −0.40% |
| 1821 | 417 | +0.08% |
| 1831 | 431 | +0.33% |
| 1841 | 463 | +0.72% |
| 1846 | 502 | +1.63% |
| 1851 | 480 | −0.89% |
| 1856 | 435 | −1.95% |
| 1861 | 977 | +17.57% |
| 1866 | 1,028 | +1.02% |
| 1872 | 963 | −1.08% |
| 1876 | 1,109 | +3.59% |
| 1881 | 1,093 | −0.29% |
| 1886 | 1,170 | +1.37% |
| 1891 | 1,224 | +0.91% |
| 1896 | 1,263 | +0.63% |
| 1901 | 1,320 | +0.89% |

| Year | Pop. | ±% p.a. |
|---|---|---|
| 1906 | 1,343 | +0.35% |
| 1911 | 1,455 | +1.61% |
| 1921 | 1,453 | −0.01% |
| 1926 | 1,505 | +0.71% |
| 1931 | 1,434 | −0.96% |
| 1936 | 1,382 | −0.74% |
| 1946 | 1,330 | −0.38% |
| 1954 | 1,117 | −2.16% |
| 1962 | 1,018 | −1.15% |
| 1968 | 852 | −2.92% |
| 1975 | 824 | −0.48% |
| 1982 | 836 | +0.21% |
| 1990 | 875 | +0.57% |
| 1999 | 869 | −0.08% |
| 2007 | 984 | +1.57% |
| 2012 | 1,134 | +2.88% |
| 2017 | 1,154 | +0.35% |
| 2023 | 1,177 | +0.33% |

Source: EHESS and INSEE (1968-2023)

== Map ==
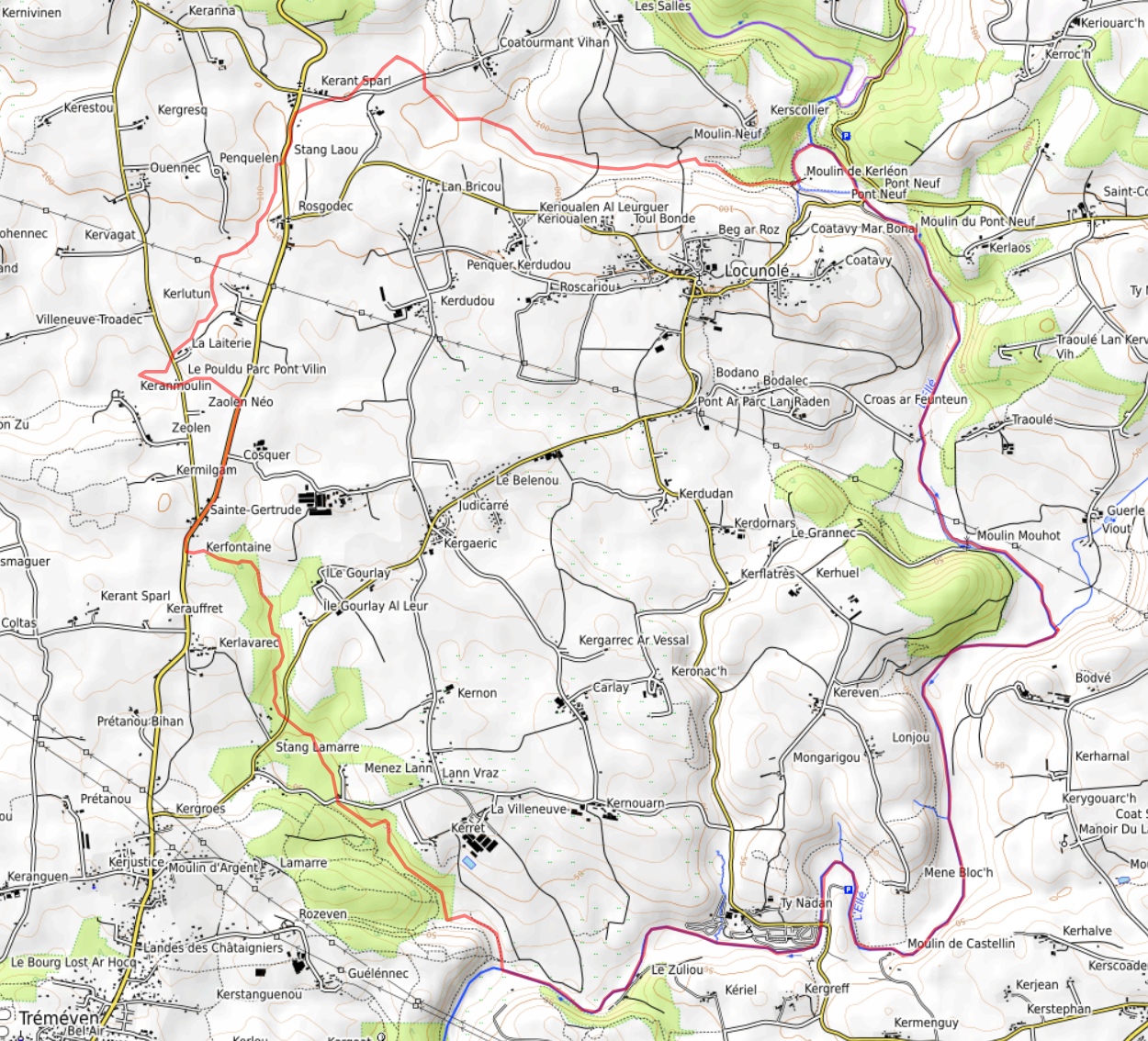
Topographic map

== Gallery ==
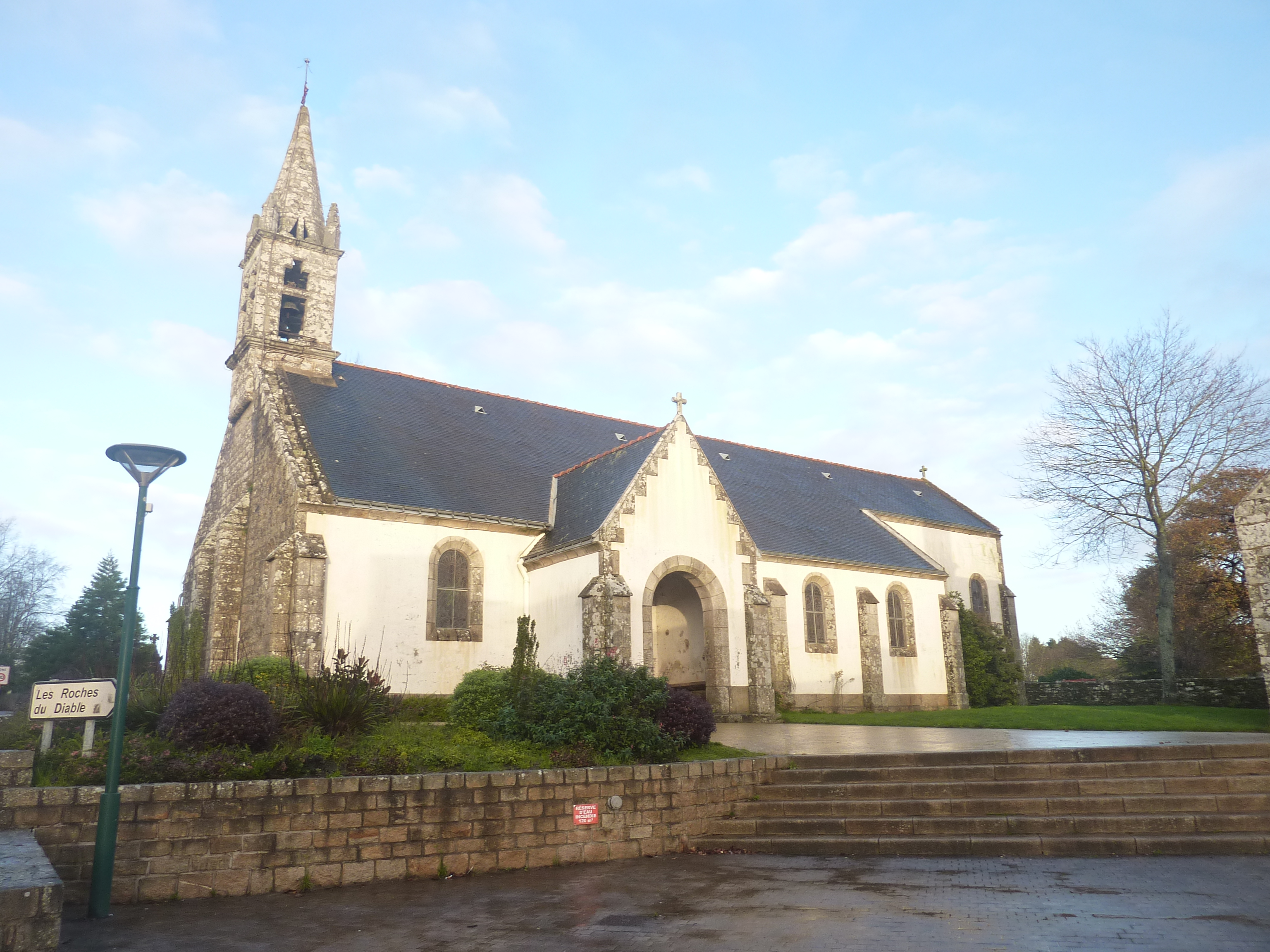
The parish church Saint Guénolé

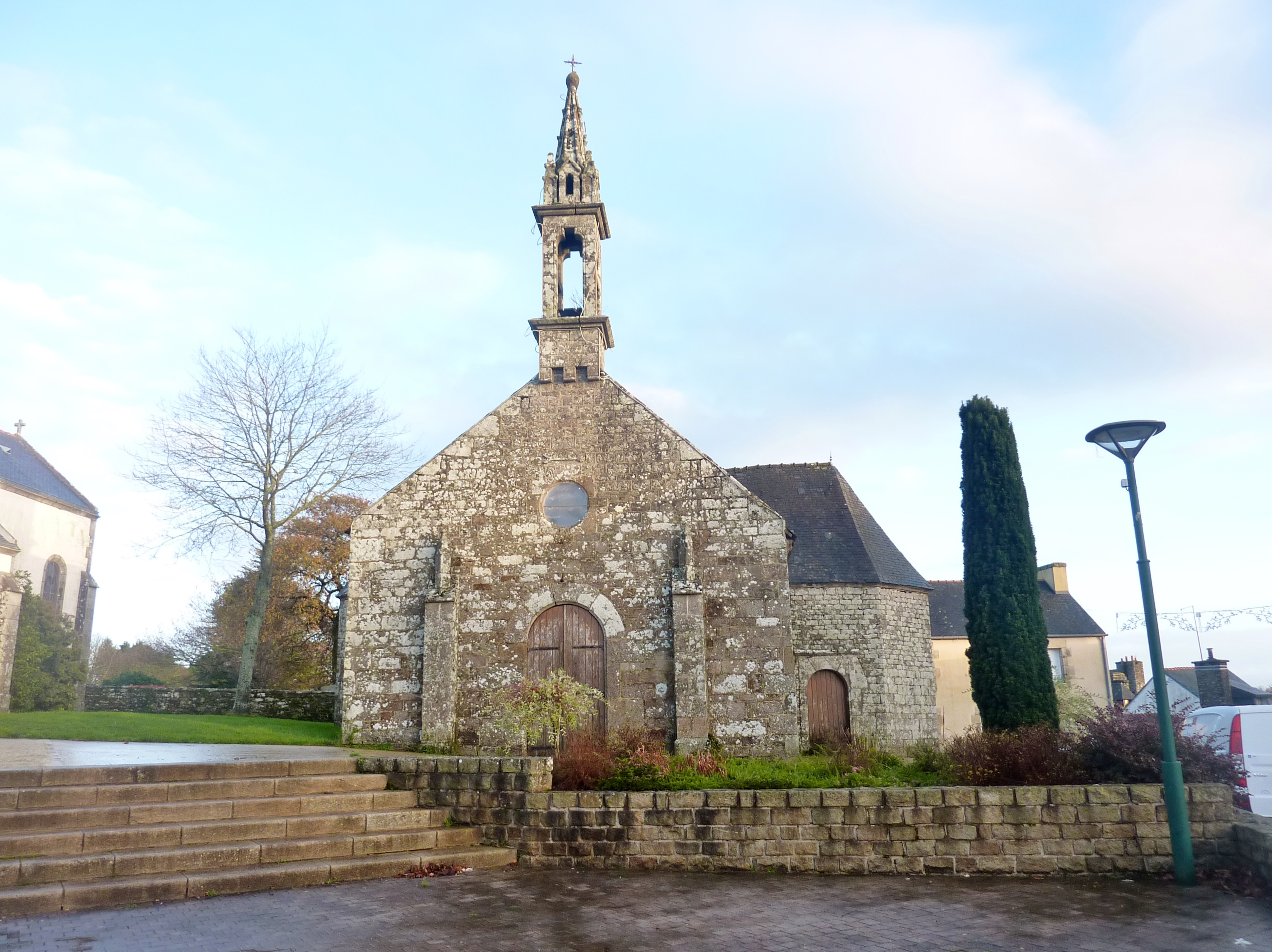
Chapel Notre Dame de Folgoët

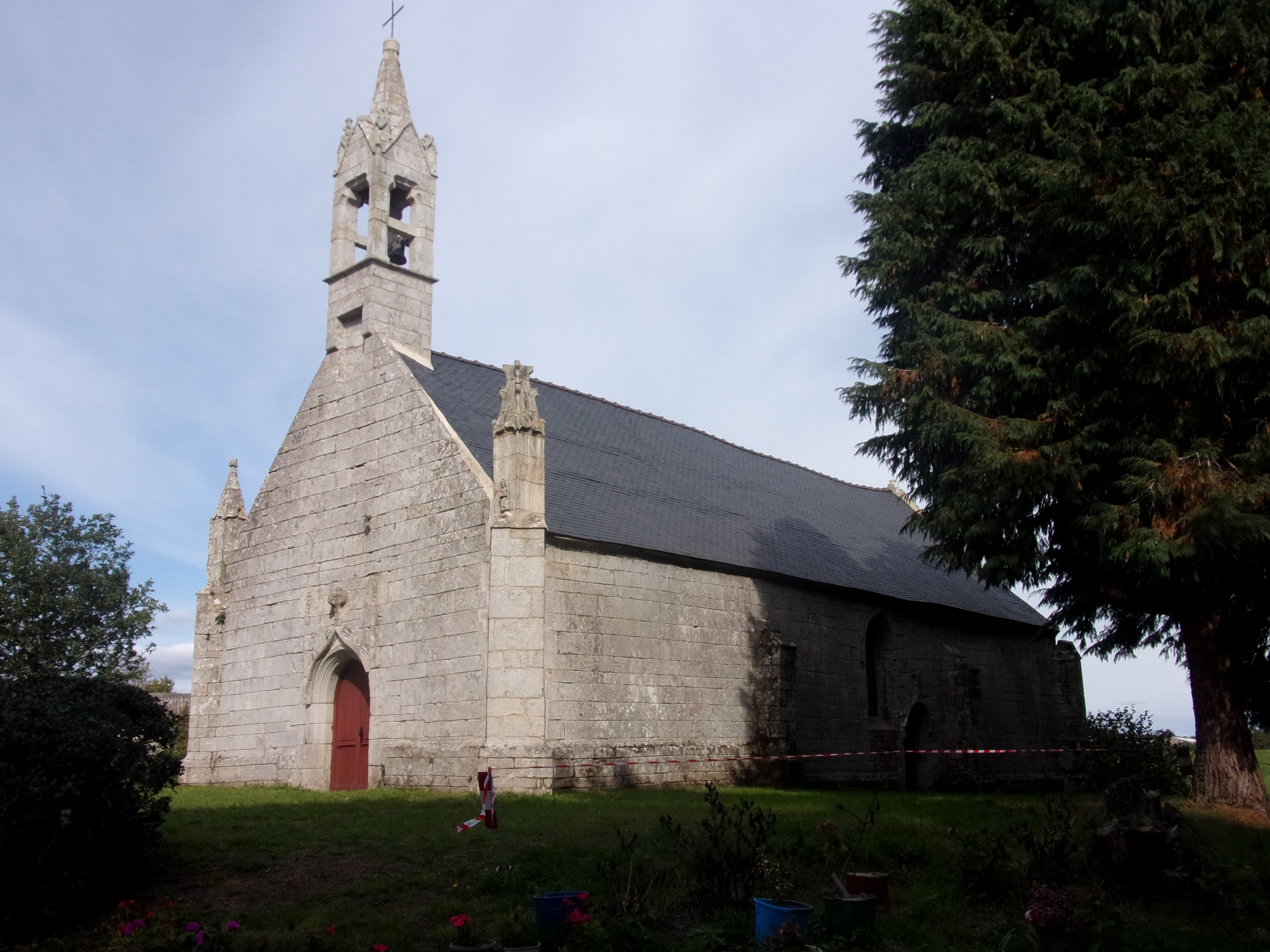
Chapel Sainte-Gertrude

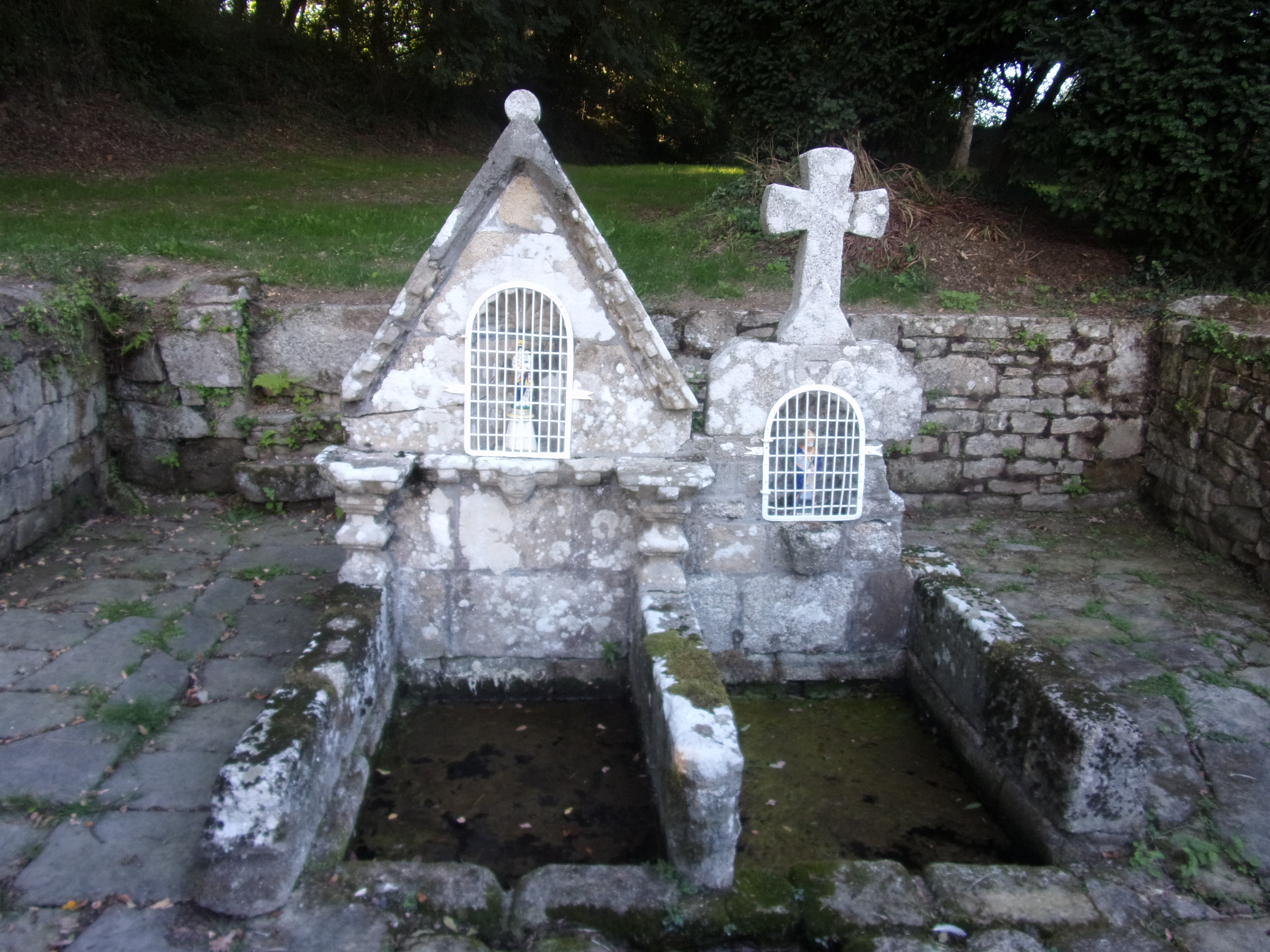
Fountains of saints

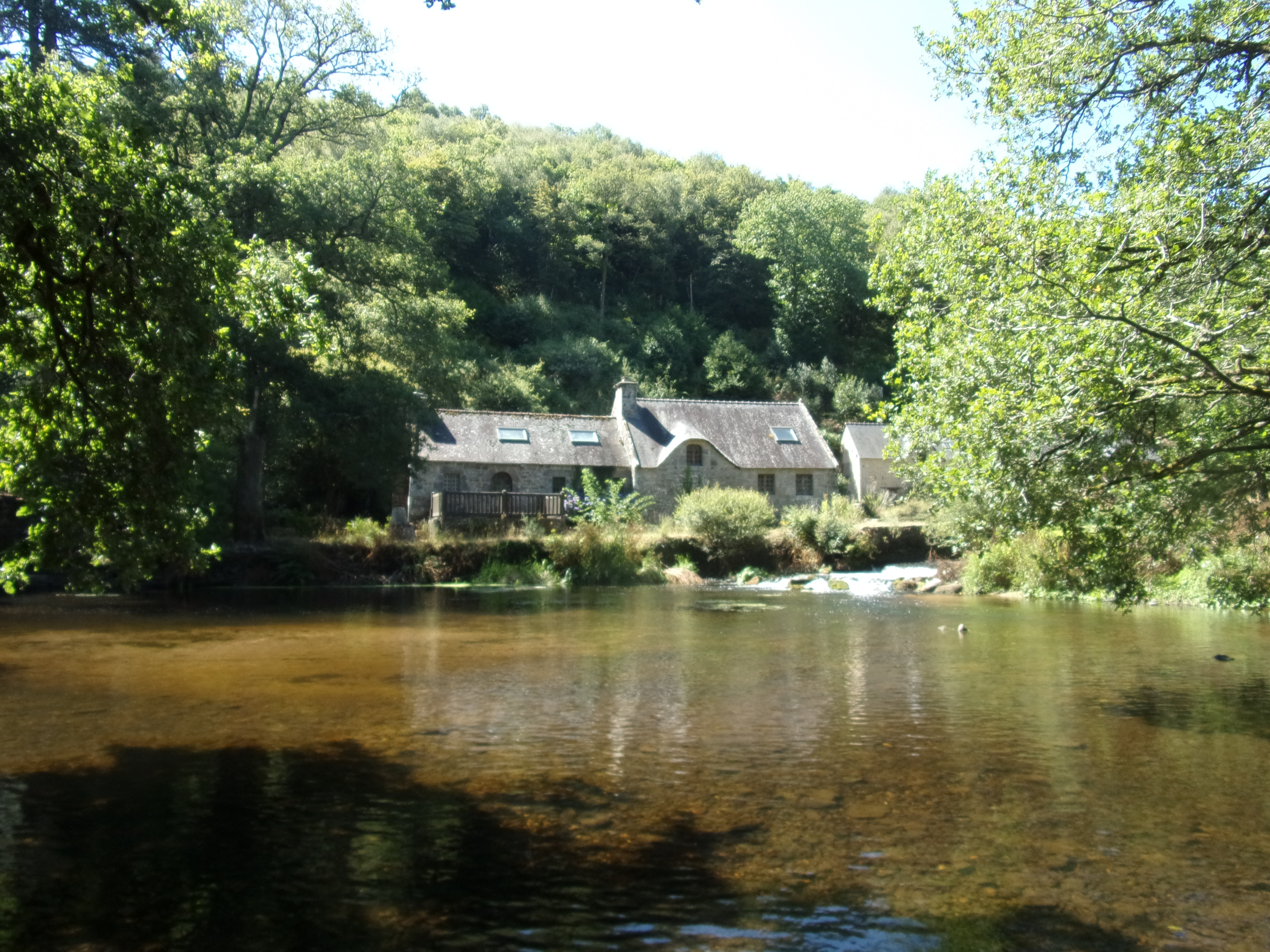
Mill Mohot

== See also ==
- Communes of the Finistère department
- Entry on sculptor of local war memorial Jean Joncourt
