= Louis Le Pensec =

French politician (1937–2024)

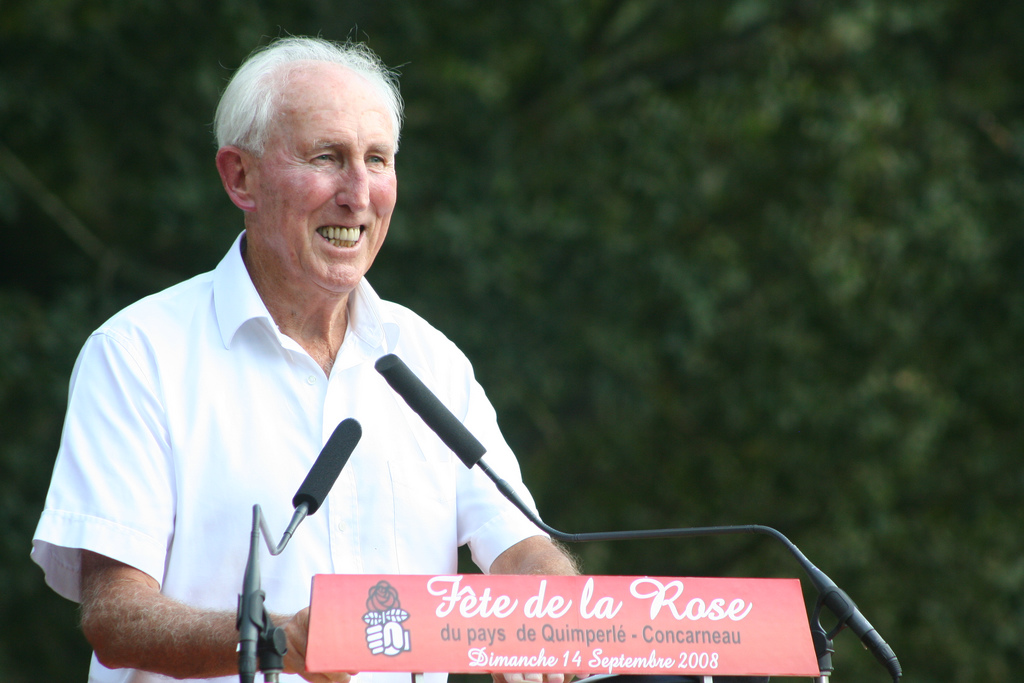
- Le Pensec in 2008

Minister of Agriculture and Fisheries
- In office 1997–1998
- President: Jacques Chirac
- Prime Minister: Lionel Jospin
- Preceded by: Philippe Vasseur
- Succeeded by: Jean Glavany

Personal details
- Born: 8 January 1937 Mellac, Finistère, France
- Died: 10 January 2024 (aged 87) Quimperlé, France
- Party: Socialist Party
- Education: University of Rennes 1

Louis Le Pensec (8 January 1937 – 10 January 2024) was a French politician. He was a member of the Socialist Party. Between 1973 and 1997, he was a member of the Parliament.

From 27 September 1998 to 30 September 2008 he was a Senator of Finistère. From 1988 and 1991, he was the spokesman of the French government. Between 1997 and 1998, he was minister of agriculture. He was also the minister for Overseas Territories.

== Biography ==
=== Early life and education ===
Louis Le Pensec was born on 8 January 1937 in Mellac. Son of a worker at the Mauduit paper mills (Quimperlé), he held a law degree and a diploma in management from the IGR-IAE at University of Rennes 1. He became an executive attaché at SNECMA (now Safran Aircraft Engines), then head of personnel at SAVIEM in 1967.

=== Death ===
Le Pensec died in Quimperlé on 10 January 2024, at the age of 87.
