= Mellac =

Mellac Mellag
- Commune
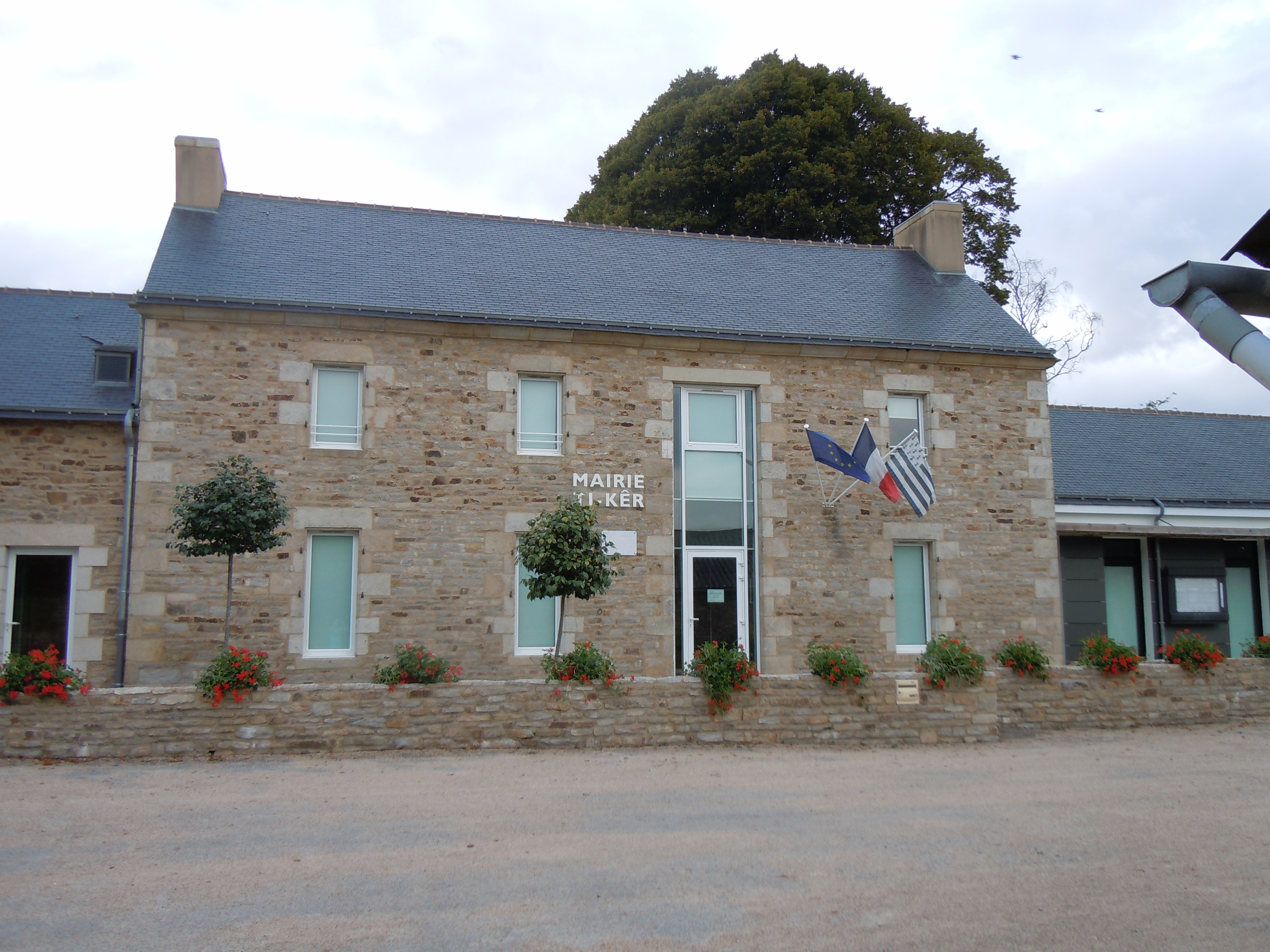
- The town hall in Mellac

- Coat of arms
- Location of Mellac
- Location within France Location within Brittany
- Coordinates: 47°54′17″N 3°34′36″W
- Country: France
- Region: Brittany
- Department: Finistère
- Arrondissement: Quimper
- Canton: Quimperlé
- Intercommunality: CA Quimperlé Communauté

Government
  - Mayor (2020–2026): Franck Chapoulie
- Area^{1}: 26.38 km^{2} (10.19 sq mi)
- Highest elevation: 101 m (331 ft)
- Lowest elevation: 12 m (39 ft)
- Population (2023): 3,404
  - Density: 129.0/km^{2} (334.2/sq mi)
- Time zone: UTC+01:00 (CET)
  - Summer (DST): UTC+02:00 (CEST)
- INSEE/Postal code: 29147 /29300
- ^{1} French Land Register data, which excludes lakes, ponds, glaciers > 1 km^{2} (0.386 sq mi or 247 acres) and river estuaries.

Mellac (French pronunciation: [mɛlak]; Breton: Mellag) is a commune in the Finistère department of Brittany in north-western France.

== Population ==
Inhabitants of Mellac are called in French Mellacois.

Historical population

Year	Pop.	±% p.a.
1793	1,250	—
1800	1,312	+0.69%
1806	1,020	−4.11%
1821	1,216	+1.18%
1831	1,141	−0.63%
1836	1,259	+1.99%
1841	1,188	−1.15%
1846	1,299	+1.80%
1851	1,302	+0.05%
1856	1,272	−0.47%
1861	1,350	+1.20%
1866	1,370	+0.29%
1872	1,213	−2.01%
1876	1,326	+2.25%
1881	1,371	+0.67%
1886	1,409	+0.55%
1891	1,421	+0.17%
1896	1,496	+1.03%
1901	1,501	+0.07%

Year	Pop.	±% p.a.
1906	1,475	−0.35%
1911	1,456	−0.26%
1921	1,469	+0.09%
1926	1,452	−0.23%
1931	1,435	−0.24%
1936	1,357	−1.11%
1946	1,412	+0.40%
1954	1,264	−1.37%
1962	1,283	+0.19%
1968	1,390	+1.34%
1975	1,638	+2.37%
1982	1,855	+1.79%
1990	2,192	+2.11%
1999	2,314	+0.60%
2007	2,570	+1.32%
2012	2,764	+1.47%
2017	3,112	+2.40%
2023	3,404	+1.51%

Source: EHESS and INSEE (1968-2023)

== Geography ==
The village centre is located 4.5 km (2.8 mi) northeast of Quimperlé. Historically, Mellac belongs to Cornouaille. The river Isole forms the commune's northern and eastern borders.

=== Neighboring communes ===
Mellac is border by Saint-Thurien and Querrien to the north, by Tréméven to the east, by Quimperlé and Baye to the south and by Le Trévoux and Bannalec to the west.

== Map ==
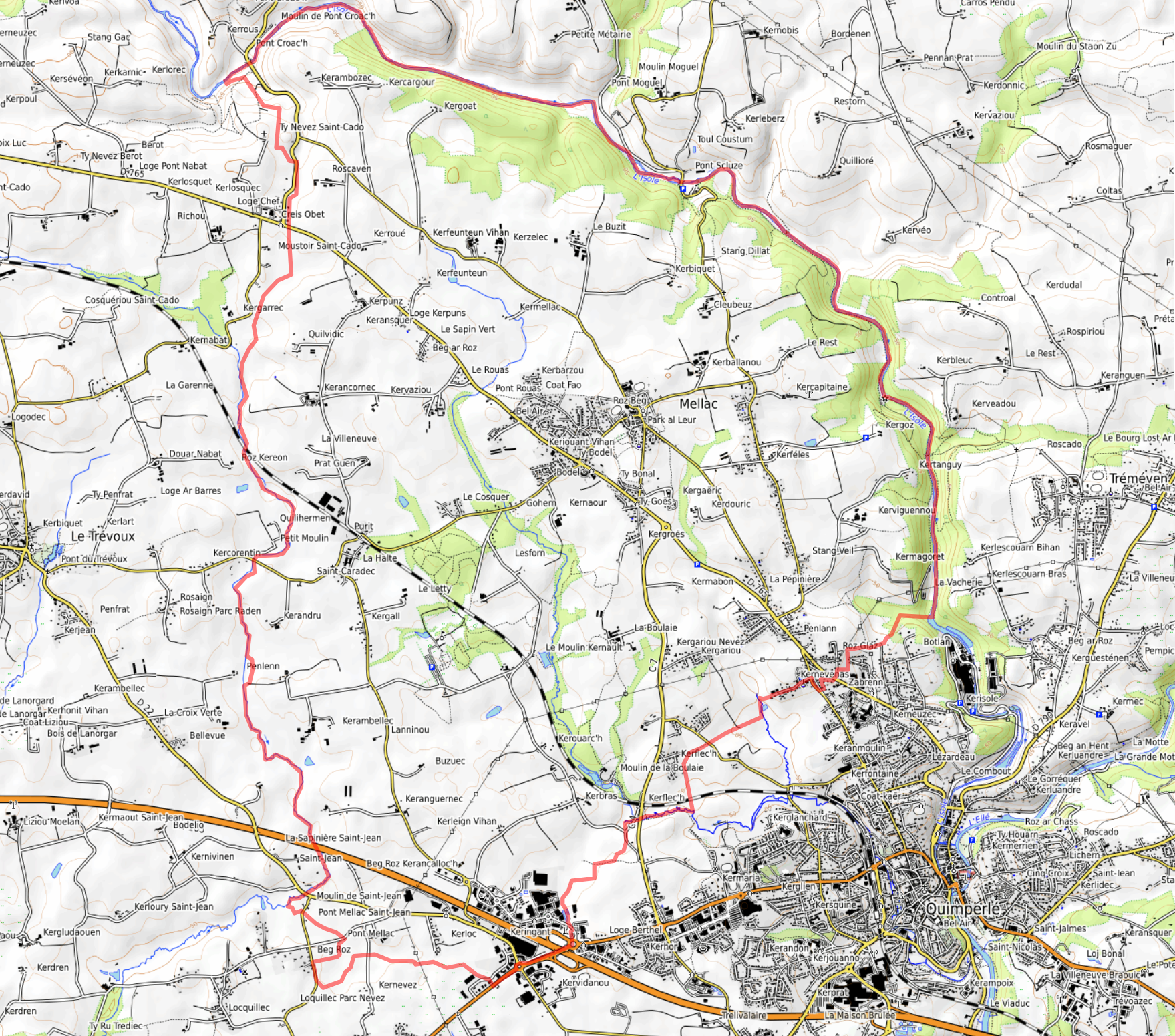
Topographic map

== History ==
The oldest surviving parish registers date back to 1562.

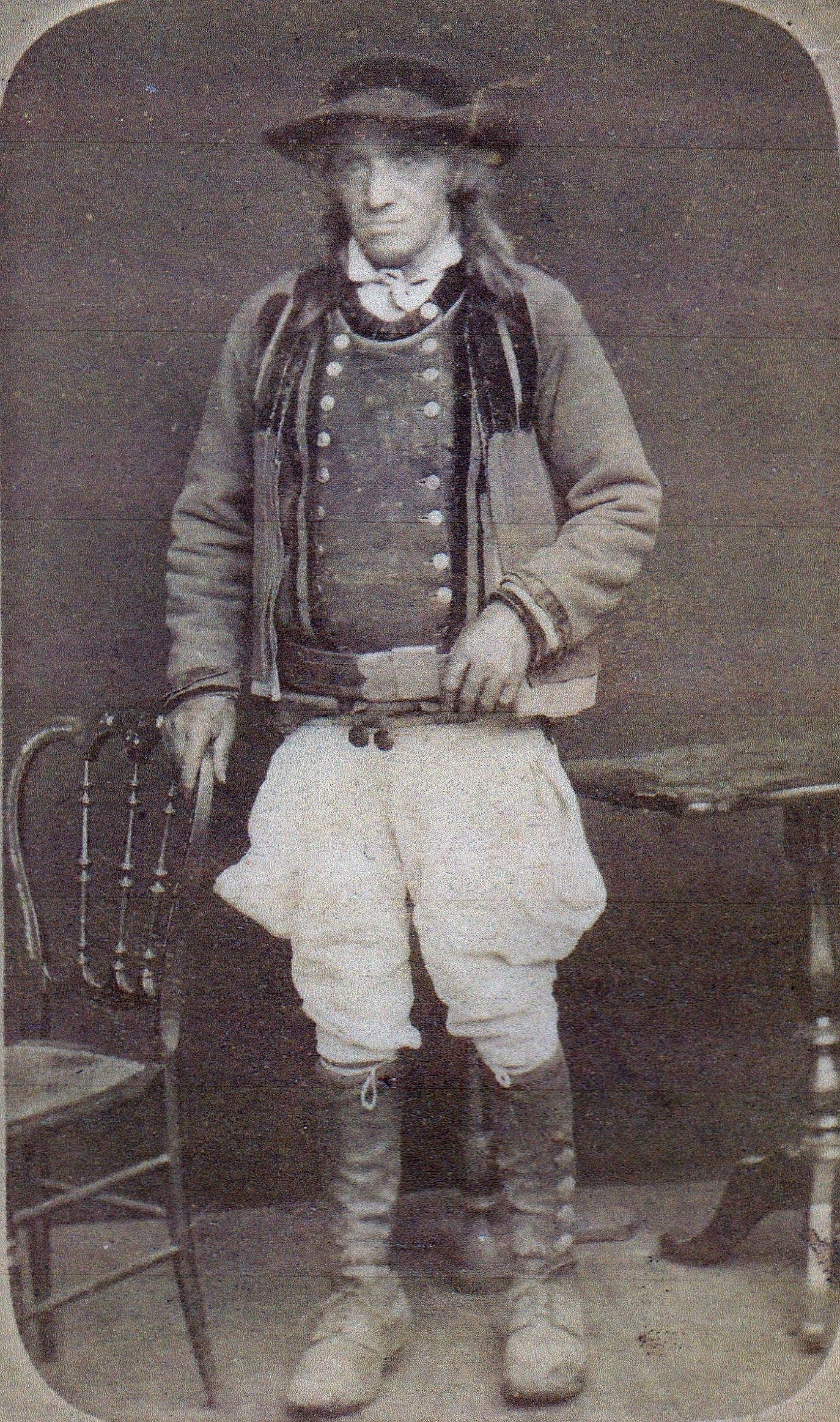
Yves Tamic, mayor of Mellac from 1871 to 1891, in regional costume.

== Gallery ==
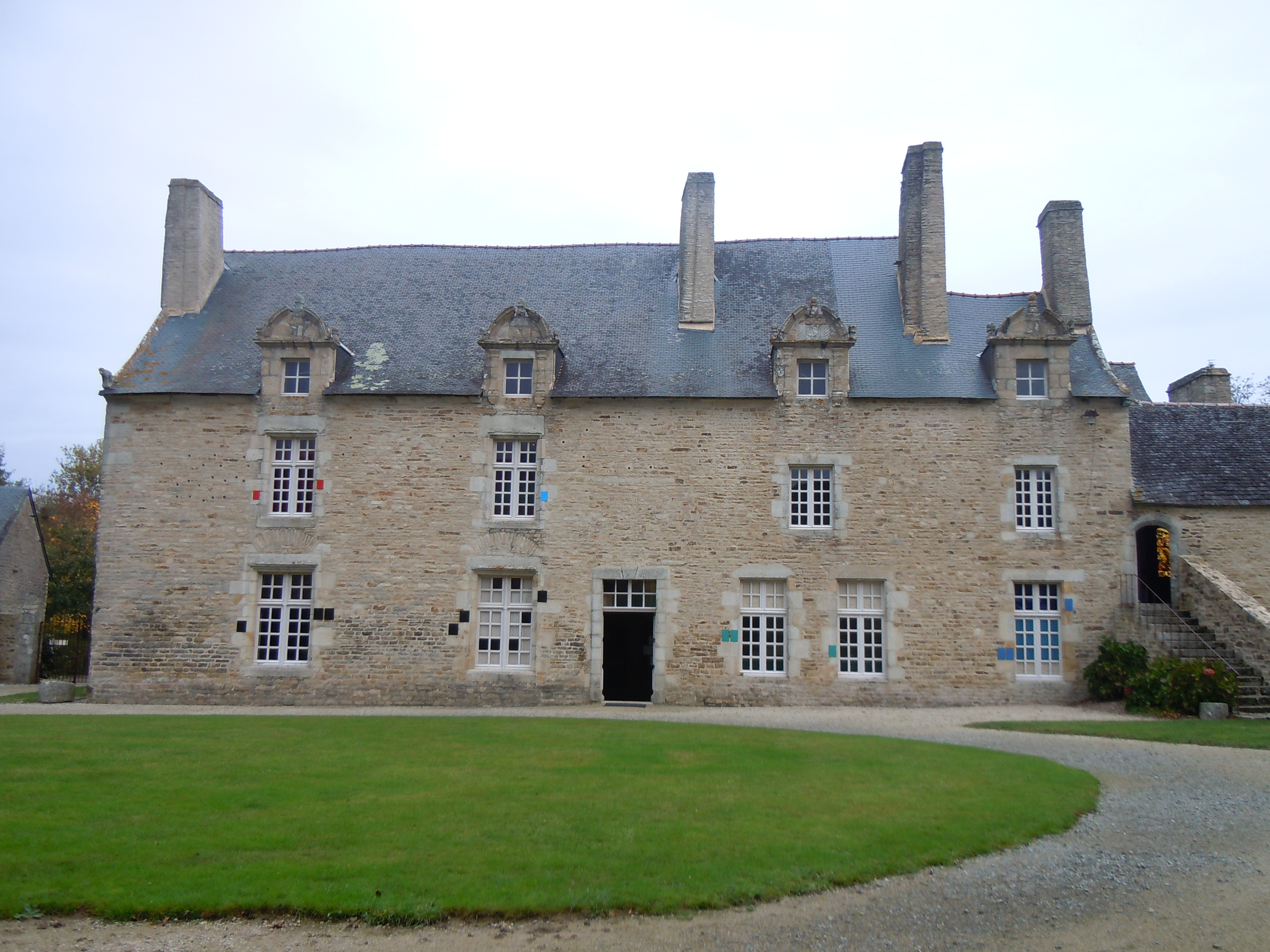
Manor of Kernault

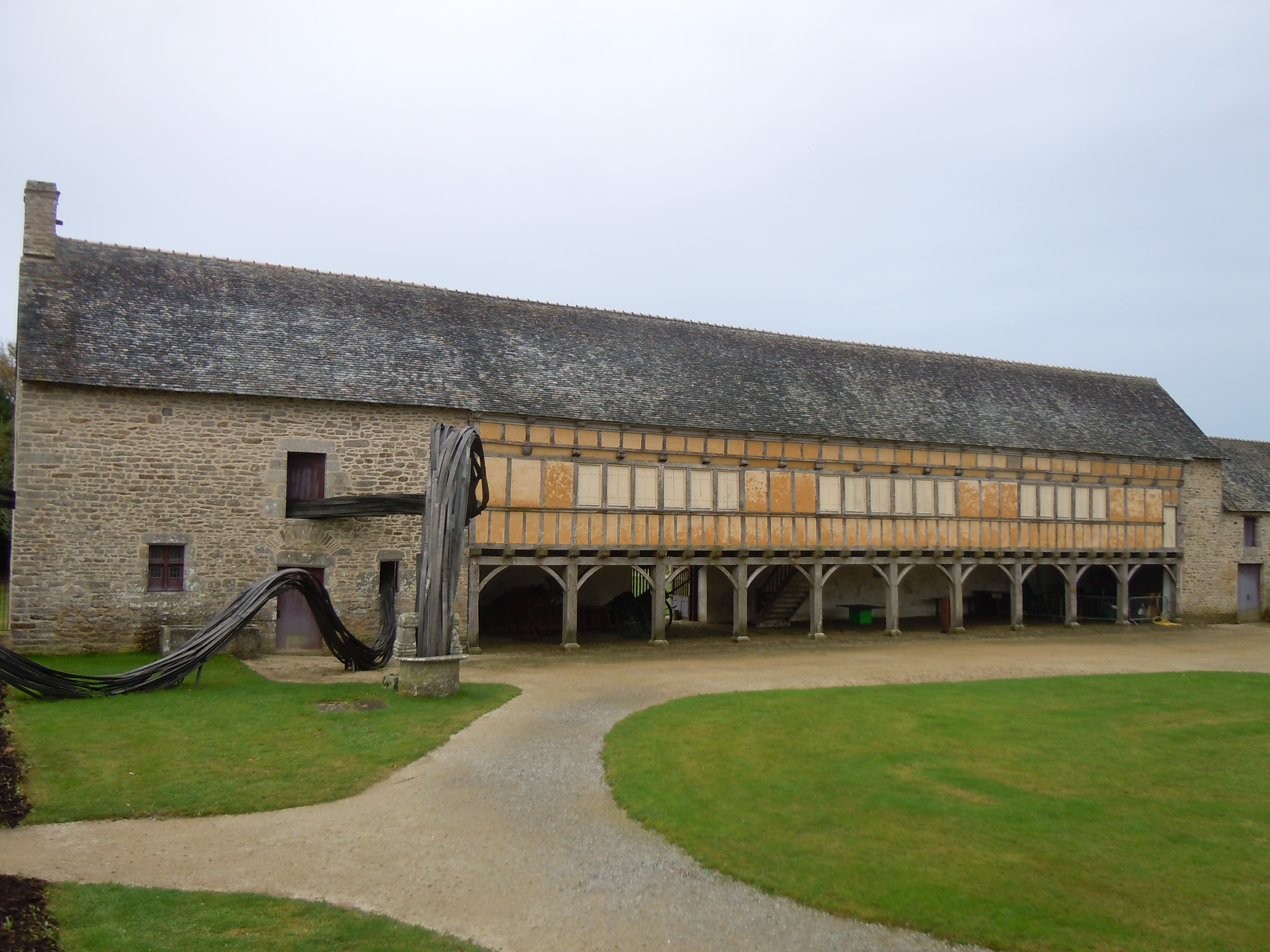
Granary of Manor of Kernault

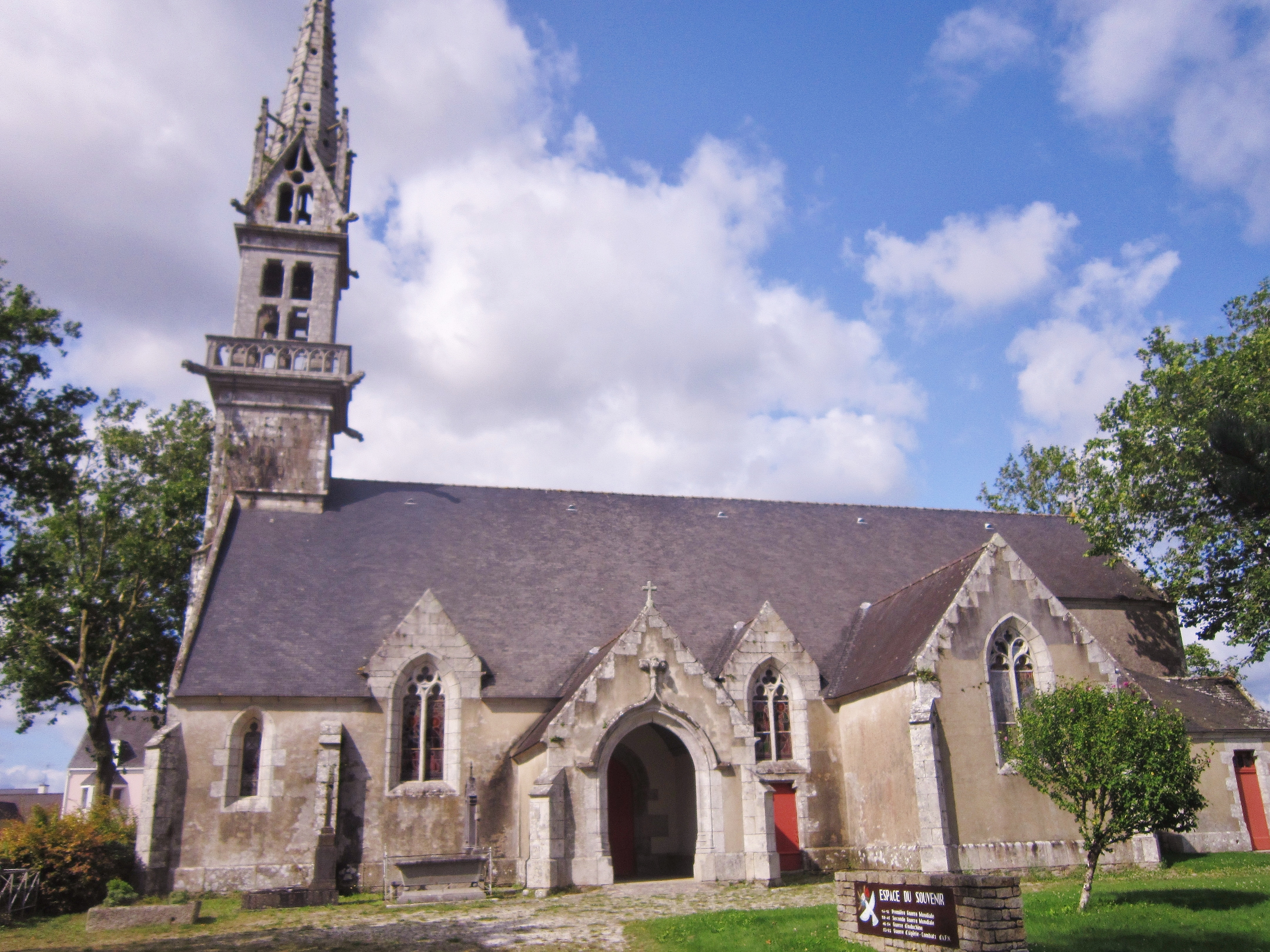
The parish church

== See also ==
- Communes of the Finistère department
