= Querrien =

Querrien Kerien
- Commune
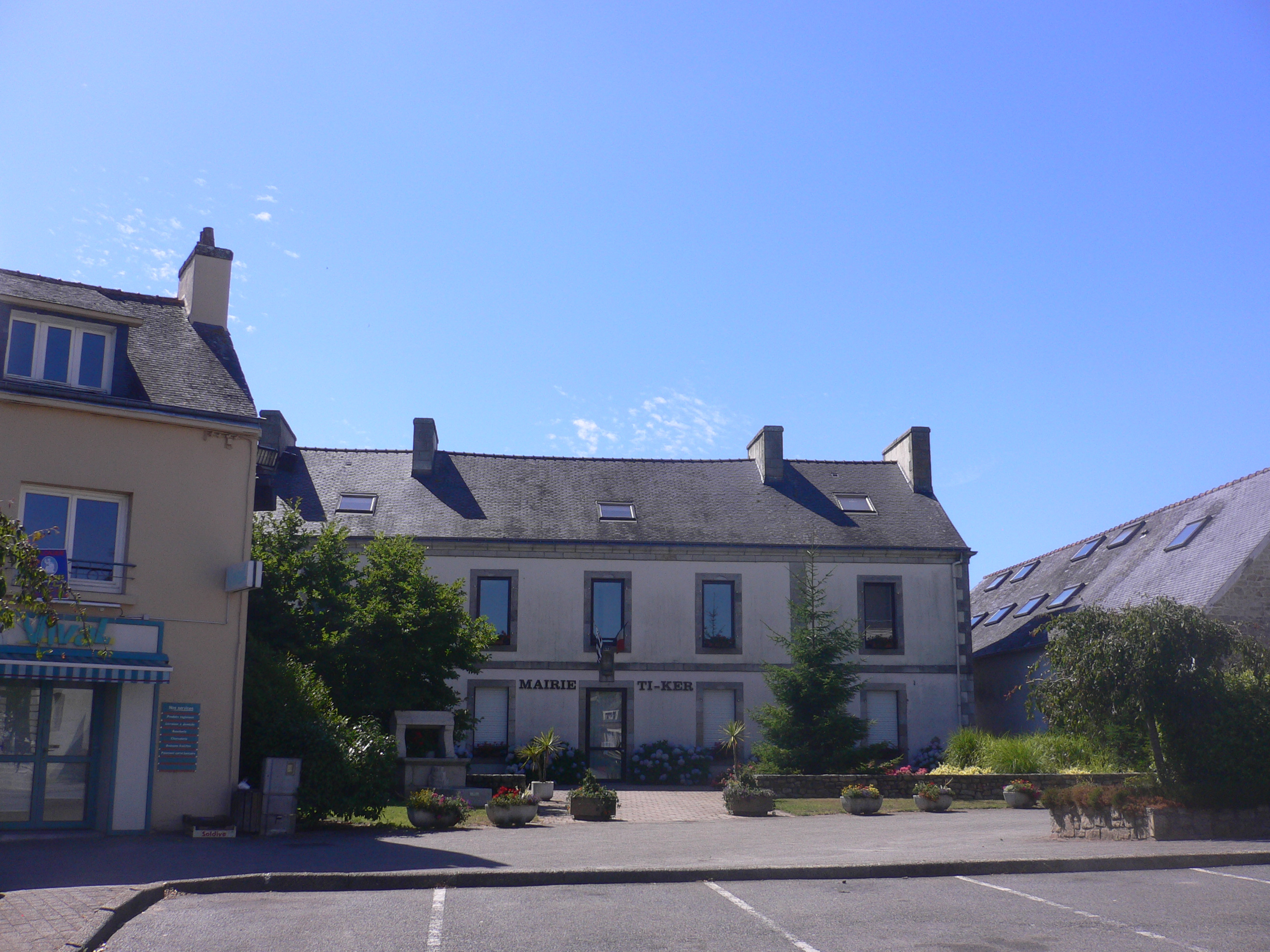
- Querrien village hall

- Coat of arms
- Location of Querrien
- Location within France Location within Brittany
- Coordinates: 47°57′38″N 3°32′08″W
- Country: France
- Region: Brittany
- Department: Finistère
- Arrondissement: Quimper
- Canton: Quimperlé
- Intercommunality: CA Quimperlé Communauté

Government
  - Mayor (2020–2026): Stéphane Cado
- Area^{1}: 54.01 km^{2} (20.85 sq mi)
- Highest elevation: 172 m (564 ft)
- Lowest elevation: 13 m (43 ft)
- Population (2023): 1,645
  - Density: 30.46/km^{2} (78.88/sq mi)
- Time zone: UTC+01:00 (CET)
  - Summer (DST): UTC+02:00 (CEST)
- INSEE/Postal code: 29230 /29310
- ^{1} French Land Register data, which excludes lakes, ponds, glaciers > 1 km^{2} (0.386 sq mi or 247 acres) and river estuaries.

Querrien (French pronunciation: [kɛʁjɛ̃]; Breton: Kerien) is a commune in the Finistère department of Brittany in northwestern France.

== Population ==
Inhabitants of Querrien are called in French Querriennois.

Historical population

Year	Pop.	±% p.a.
1793	2,397	—
1800	2,516	+0.69%
1806	2,390	−0.85%
1821	2,796	+1.05%
1831	2,871	+0.27%
1836	2,982	+0.76%
1841	3,103	+0.80%
1846	3,260	+0.99%
1851	3,282	+0.13%
1856	3,019	−1.66%
1861	2,527	−3.50%
1866	2,561	+0.27%
1872	2,183	−2.63%
1876	2,630	+4.77%
1881	2,840	+1.55%
1886	3,000	+1.10%
1891	3,153	+1.00%
1896	3,173	+0.13%
1901	3,260	+0.54%

Year	Pop.	±% p.a.
1906	3,346	+0.52%
1911	3,453	+0.63%
1921	3,232	−0.66%
1926	3,280	+0.30%
1931	3,114	−1.03%
1936	3,043	−0.46%
1946	3,005	−0.13%
1954	2,597	−1.81%
1962	2,372	−1.13%
1968	2,118	−1.87%
1975	1,858	−1.85%
1982	1,759	−0.78%
1990	1,650	−0.80%
1999	1,596	−0.37%
2007	1,663	+0.52%
2012	1,731	+0.80%
2017	1,739	+0.09%
2023	1,645	−0.92%

Source: EHESS and INSEE (1968–2023)

== Geography ==
The village centre is located 10 km (6.2 mi) north of Quimperlé.

=== Neighbouring communes ===
Querrien is border by Lanvénégen to north, by Meslan and Locunolé to east, by Tréméven and Mellac to south and by Saint-Thurien to west.

== Map ==
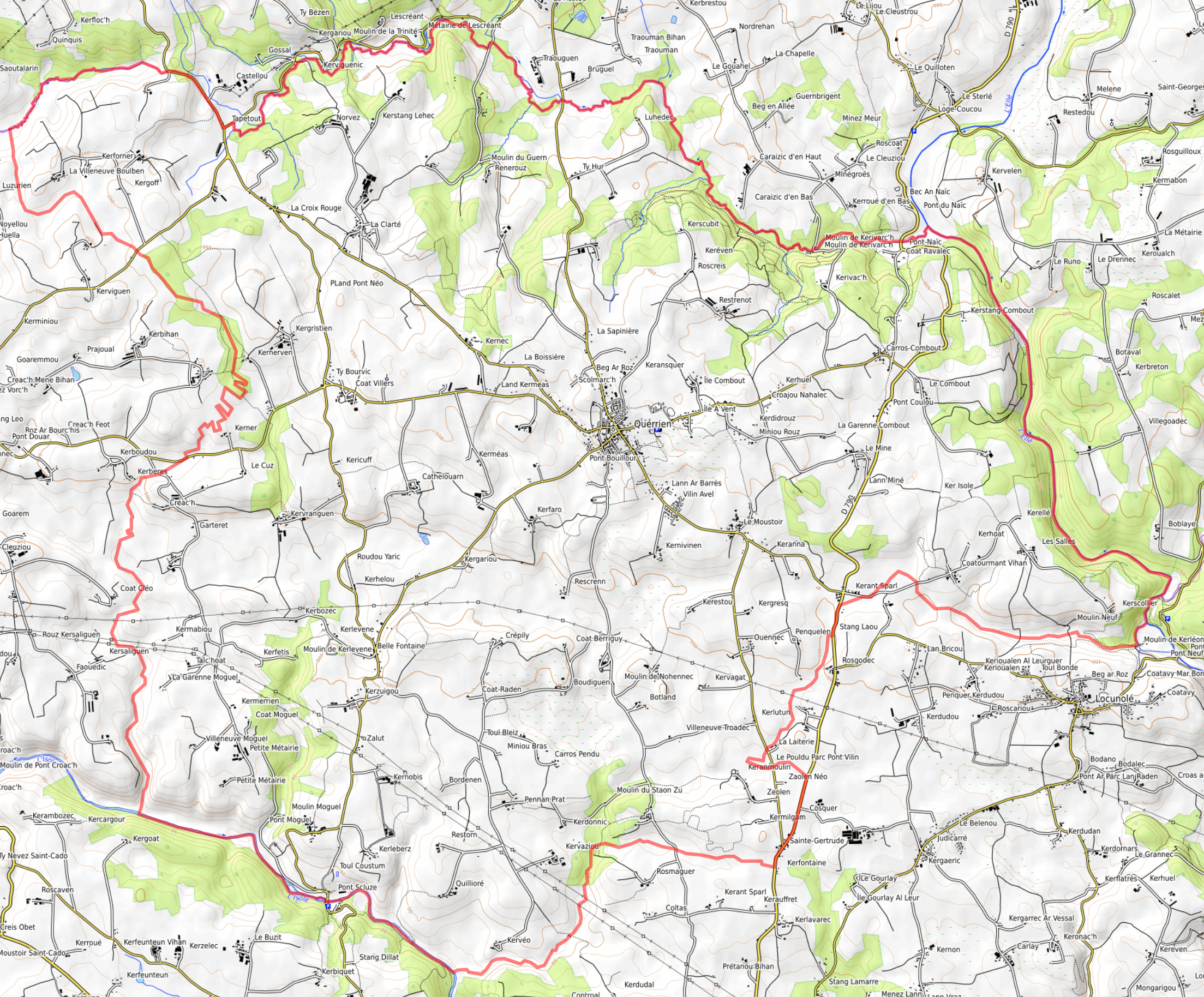
Topographic map

== Breton language ==
The municipality launched a linguistic plan concerning the Breton language through Ya d'ar brezhoneg on 7 March 2007.

== Gallery ==
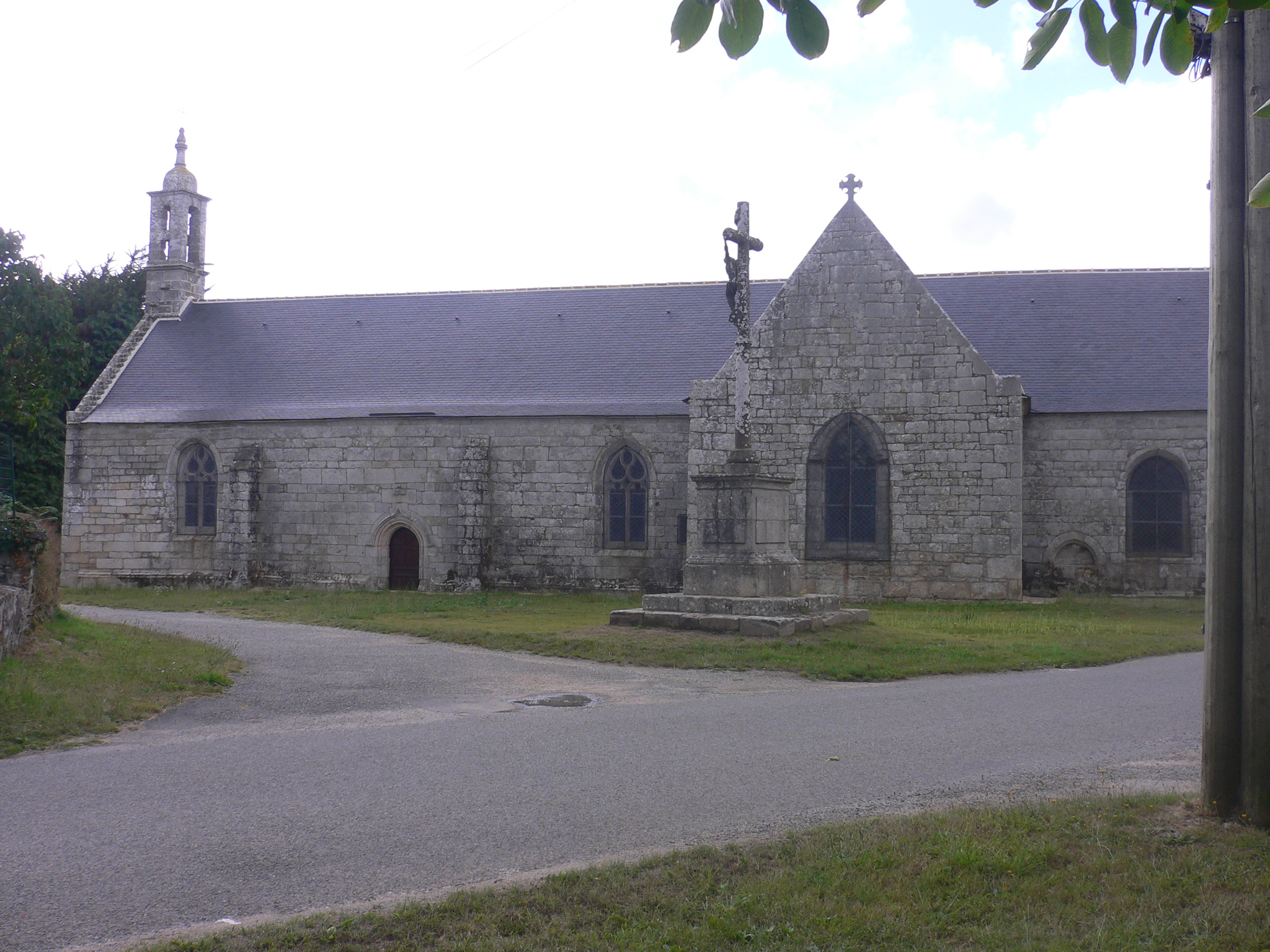
Chapel of Notre Dame de la Clarté

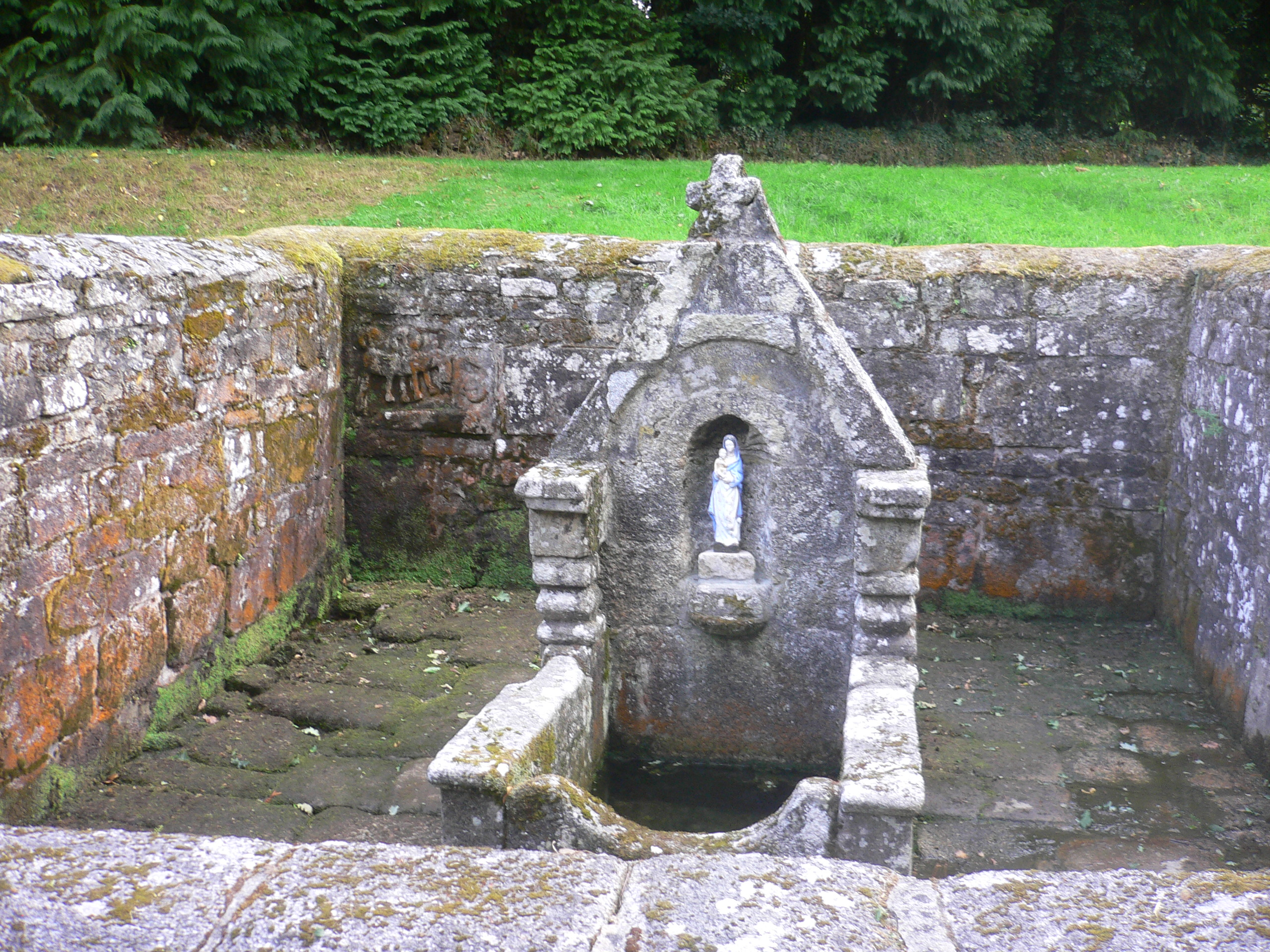
Fountain of La Clarté

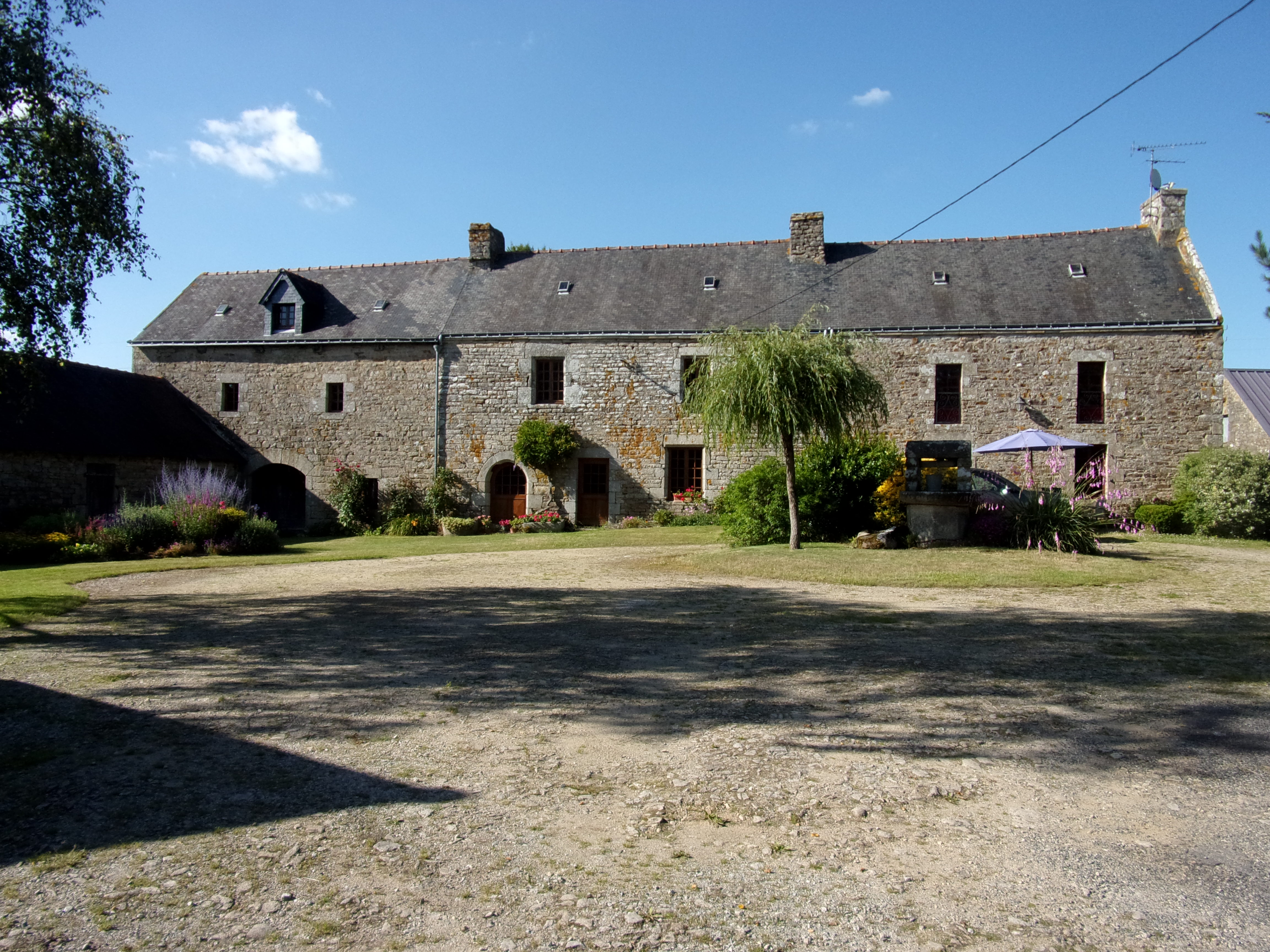
Manor of Kervagat

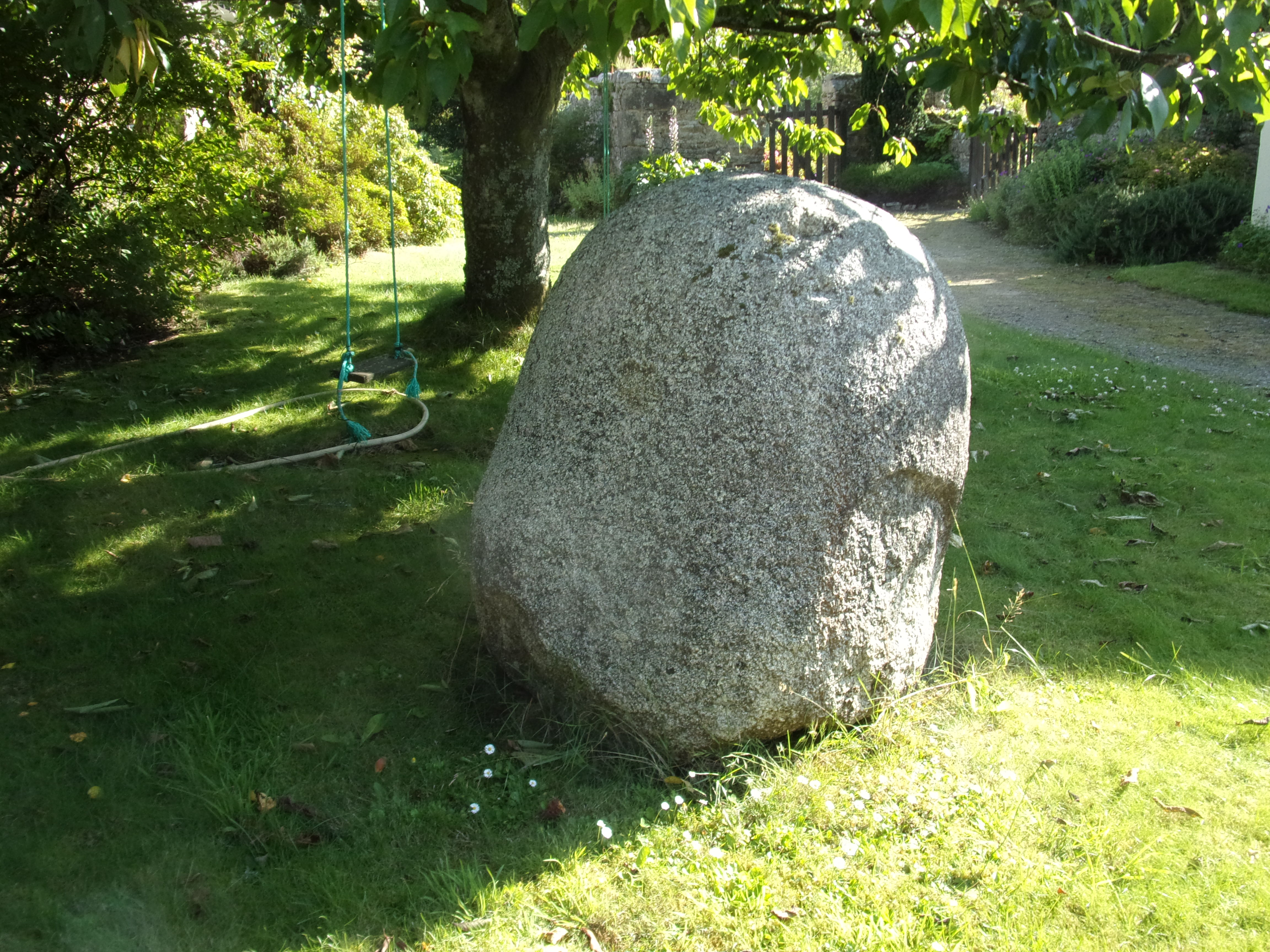
Celtic stele of Kervagat

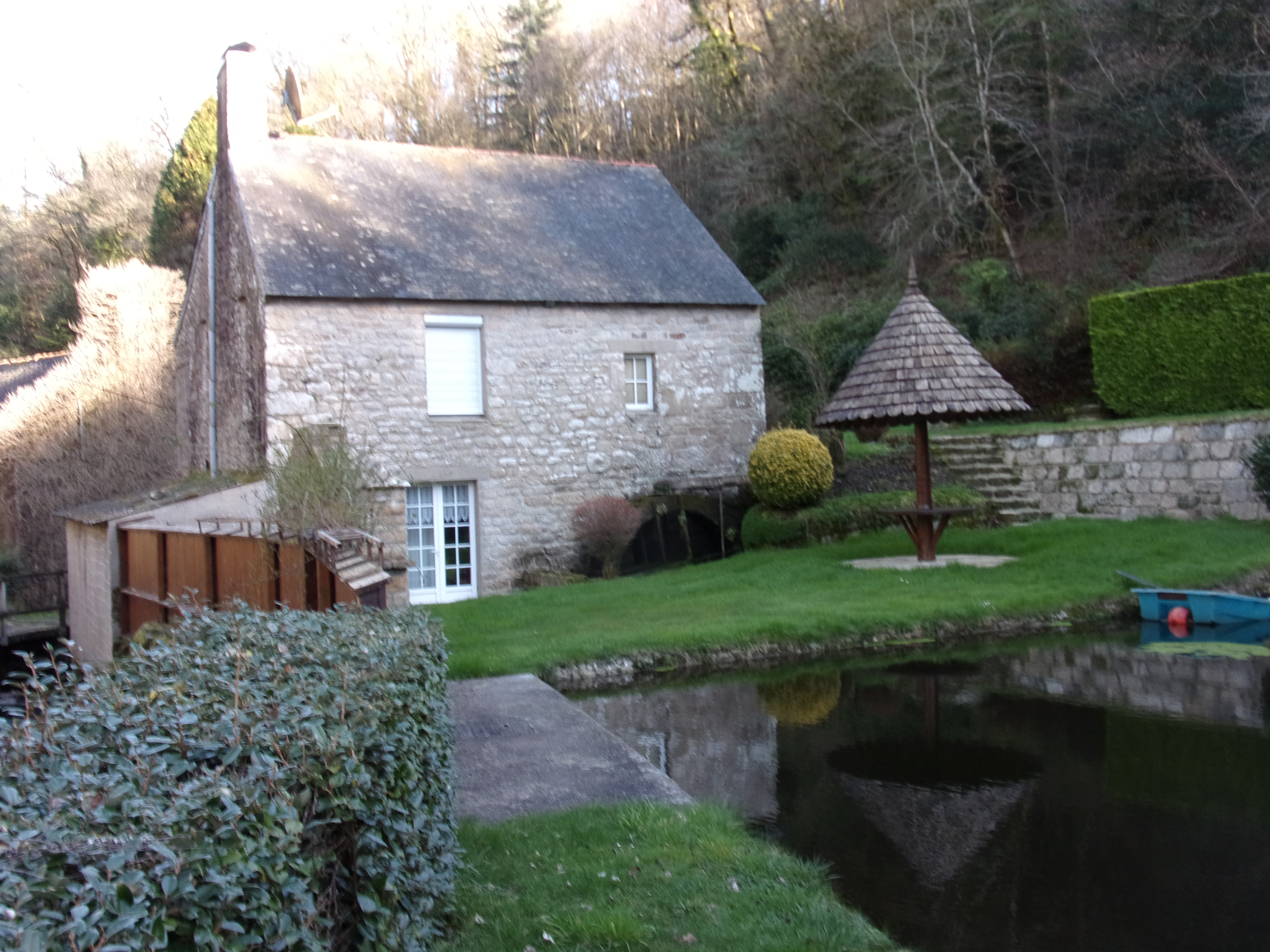
Mill of Kerivarch

== See also ==
- Communes of the Finistère department
