= Canton of Quimperlé =

Canton of France

Coordinates: 47.87°N 3.55°W

The canton of Quimperlé is an administrative division of the Finistère department, northwestern France. Its borders were modified at the French canton reorganisation which came into effect in March 2015. Its seat is in Quimperlé.

It consists of the following communes:

1. Arzano
2. Baye
3. Clohars-Carnoët
4. Guilligomarc'h
5. Locunolé
6. Mellac
7. Querrien
8. Quimperlé
9. Rédené
10. Saint-Thurien
11. Tréméven
