= Quimperlé Communauté =

- Communauté d'agglomération
- Interactive map of Quimperlé Communauté
- Coordinates: 47°54′N 03°35′W
- Country: France
- Region: Brittany
- Department: Finistère
- No. of communes: {{{nbcomm}}}
- Established: 1993
- Area: 607.0 km^{2} (234.4 sq mi)
- Population (2019): 55,993
  - Density: 92.25/km^{2} (238.9/sq mi)
- Website: www.quimperle-communaute.bzh

Quimperlé Communauté is the communauté d'agglomération, an intercommunal structure, centred on the town of Quimperlé. It is located in the Finistère department, in the Brittany region, northwestern France. Created in 1993, its seat is in Quimperlé. Its area is 607.0 km^{2}. Its population was 55,993 in 2019, of which 12,220 in Quimperlé proper.

== Composition ==
The communauté d'agglomération consists of the following 16 communes:

1. Arzano
2. Bannalec
3. Baye
4. Clohars-Carnoët
5. Guilligomarc'h
6. Locunolé
7. Mellac
8. Moëlan-sur-Mer
9. Querrien
10. Quimperlé
11. Rédené
12. Riec-sur-Bélon
13. Saint-Thurien
14. Scaër
15. Tréméven
16. Le Trévoux
