= Guilligomarc'h =

Guilligomarc'h Gwelegouarc'h
- Commune
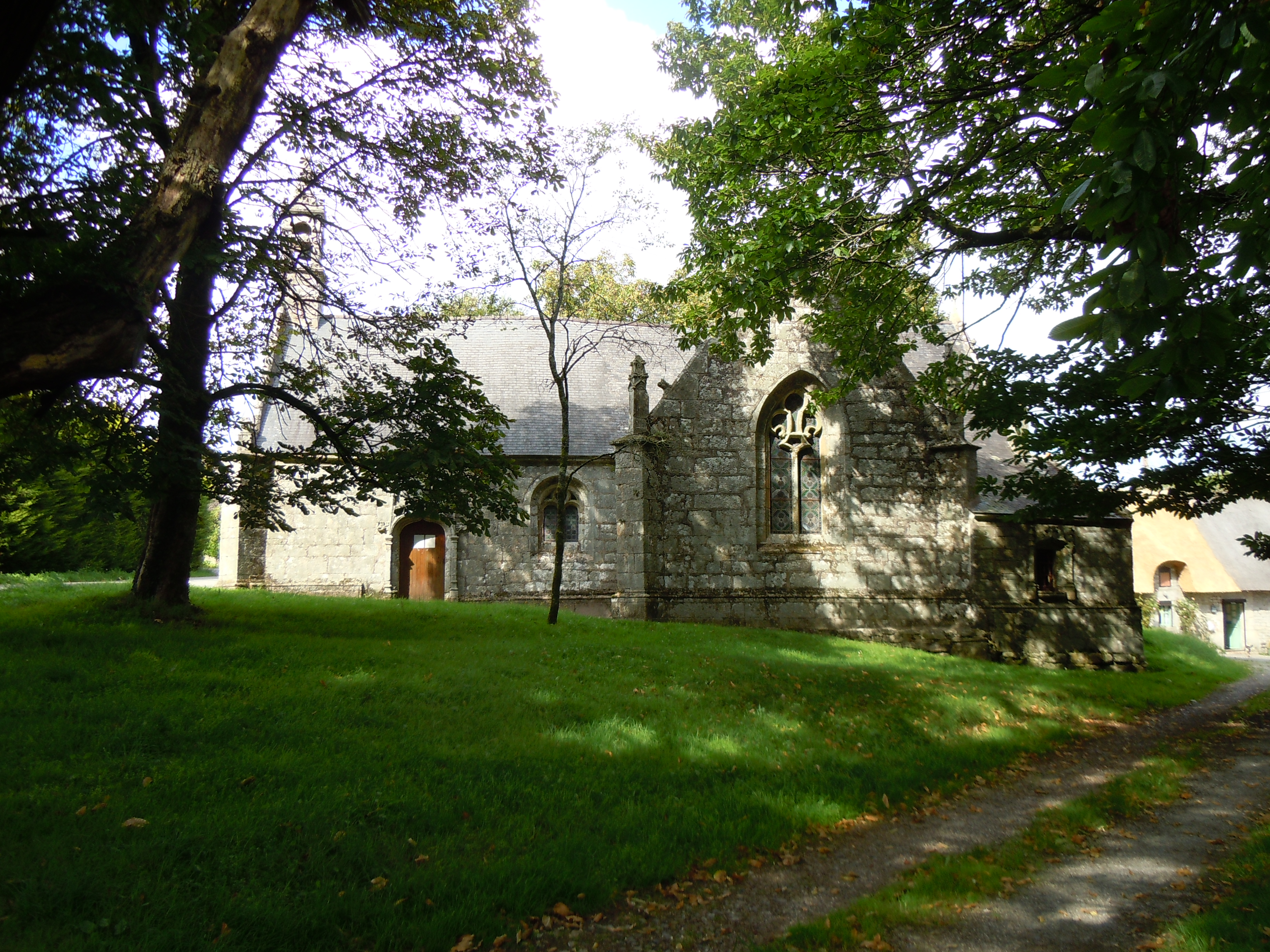
- The chapel of Saint-Eloi, in Guilligomarc'h
- Location of Guilligomarc'h
- Location within France Location within Brittany
- Coordinates: 47°56′13″N 3°24′52″W
- Country: France
- Region: Brittany
- Department: Finistère
- Arrondissement: Quimper
- Canton: Quimperlé
- Intercommunality: CA Quimperlé Communauté

Government
  - Mayor (2020–2026): Alain Follic
- Area^{1}: 22.75 km^{2} (8.78 sq mi)
- Highest elevation: 148 m (486 ft)
- Lowest elevation: 22 m (72 ft)
- Population (2023): 803
  - Density: 35.3/km^{2} (91.4/sq mi)
- Time zone: UTC+01:00 (CET)
  - Summer (DST): UTC+02:00 (CEST)
- INSEE/Postal code: 29071 /29300
- ^{1} French Land Register data, which excludes lakes, ponds, glaciers > 1 km^{2} (0.386 sq mi or 247 acres) and river estuaries.

Guilligomarc'h (Breton: Gwelegouarc'h) is a commune in the Finistère department of Brittany in north-western France.

== Population ==
Inhabitants of Guilligomarc'h are called in French Guillogomarc'hois.

Historical population

Year	Pop.	±% p.a.
1793	1,000	—
1800	1,050	+0.70%
1806	957	−1.53%
1821	936	−0.15%
1831	1,005	+0.71%
1836	1,056	+0.99%
1841	1,038	−0.34%
1846	1,141	+1.91%
1851	1,053	−1.59%
1856	1,070	+0.32%
1861	1,111	+0.75%
1866	1,113	+0.04%
1872	1,011	−1.59%
1876	1,056	+1.09%
1881	1,064	+0.15%
1886	1,125	+1.12%
1891	1,206	+1.40%
1896	1,210	+0.07%
1901	1,257	+0.77%

Year	Pop.	±% p.a.
1906	1,228	−0.47%
1911	1,276	+0.77%
1921	1,284	+0.06%
1926	1,275	−0.14%
1931	1,172	−1.67%
1936	1,142	−0.52%
1946	1,250	+0.91%
1954	924	−3.71%
1962	936	+0.16%
1968	666	−5.51%
1975	560	−2.45%
1982	569	+0.23%
1990	520	−1.12%
1999	573	+1.08%
2007	657	+1.72%
2012	730	+2.13%
2017	778	+1.28%
2023	803	+0.53%

Source: EHESS and INSEE (1968–2023)

== Geography ==
Guilligomarc'h is located in southeastern part of Finistère department, 13 km (8.1 mi) northeast of Quimperlé and 21 km (13 mi) north of Lorient. Historically, the village belongs to Vannetais. The river Ellé forms the commune's western border and the river Scorff its eastern border. Apart from the village centre, there are about seventy hamlets.

== Map ==
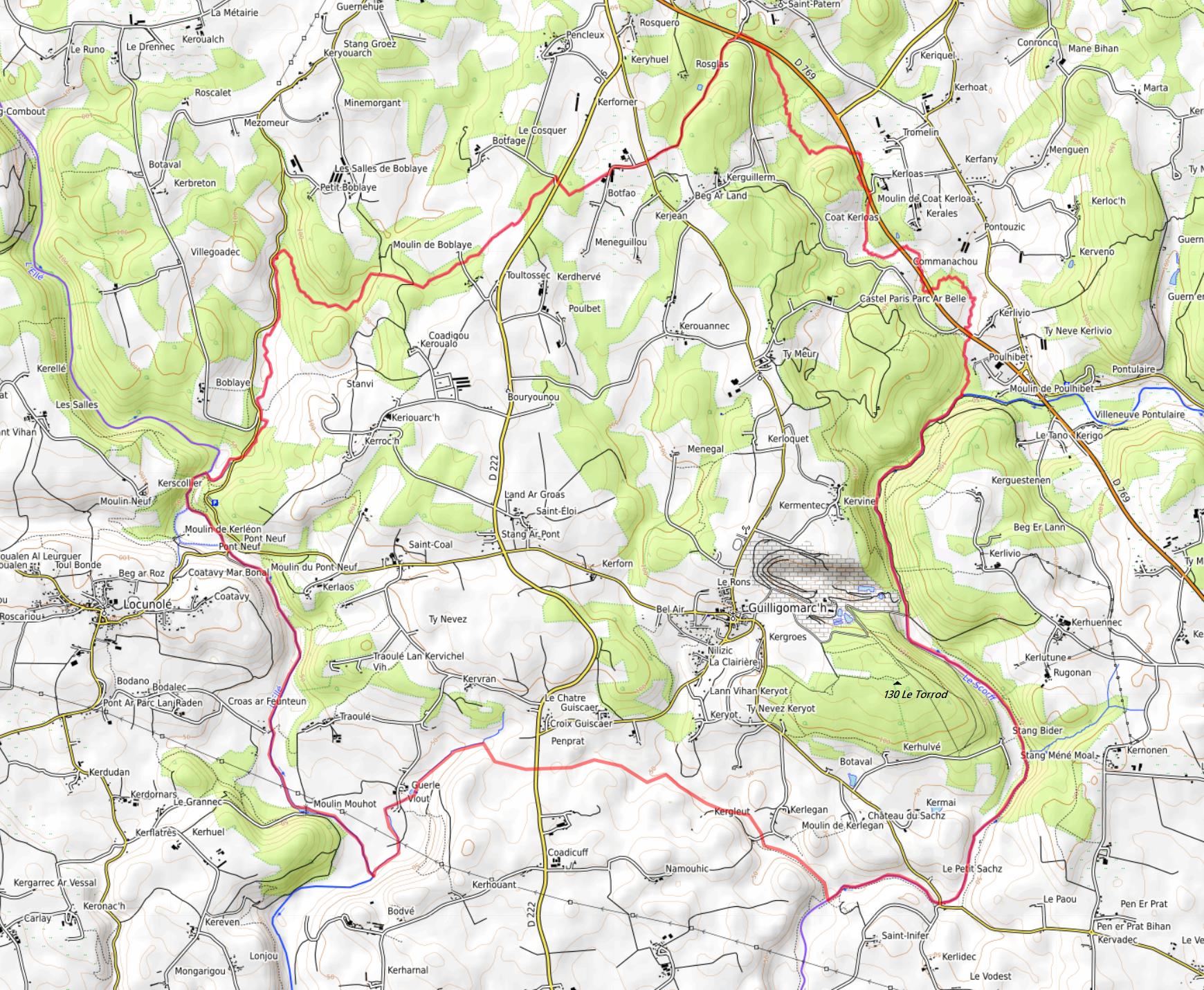
Topographic map.

== List of hamlets ==
- Beg-ar-Lann
- Bel Air
- Bois de Kerlégan, le
- Boissière, la
- Bontul
- Botaval
- Botfao
- Bouyounou
- Castel Paris
- Château du Sachz
- Châtré, le
- Clairière, la
- Clos Val
- Coadigou
- Coat ar Hourc'h
- Coat Kerloas
- Commananchou
- Crélo
- Guerlé
- Guiscaër
- Kerdhervé
- Kerforn
- Kergadiou
- Kergroes
- Kerguillerm
- Kerhoën
- Kerhulvé
- Keriel
- Keriot
- Kerioualo
- Keriouarc'h
- Kerjean
- Kerlégan
- Kerloas
- Kerloquet
- Kermai
- Kermentec
- Kernouarn
- Kerouannec
- Kerroc'h
- Kervichel
- Kervinel
- Kervöen
- Kervran
- Lann-er-Groëz
- Lann-Vihann-Keriot
- Ménégall
- Ménéguillou
- Moulin de Kerloas
- Moulin de Kerlégan
- Moulin du Stang
- Muriou
- Nilizic
- Pen Prat
- Petit Sachz, le
- Pont Neuf, le
- Porzou
- Poulbet
- Poul-Ronjou
- Ronce, le
- Saint-Coal
- Saint-Éloi
- Stang-ar-Bider
- Stang-ar-Pont
- Stang-Mene-Moal
- Stanvi
- Toul-Tossec
- Traoulé
- Ty-Carre
- Ty-Glaz
- Ty-Meur
- Ty-Nevez-Kerguillerm
- Ty-Nevez-Keriot

== History ==
The oldest surviving parish registers date back to 1624.

== Gallery ==
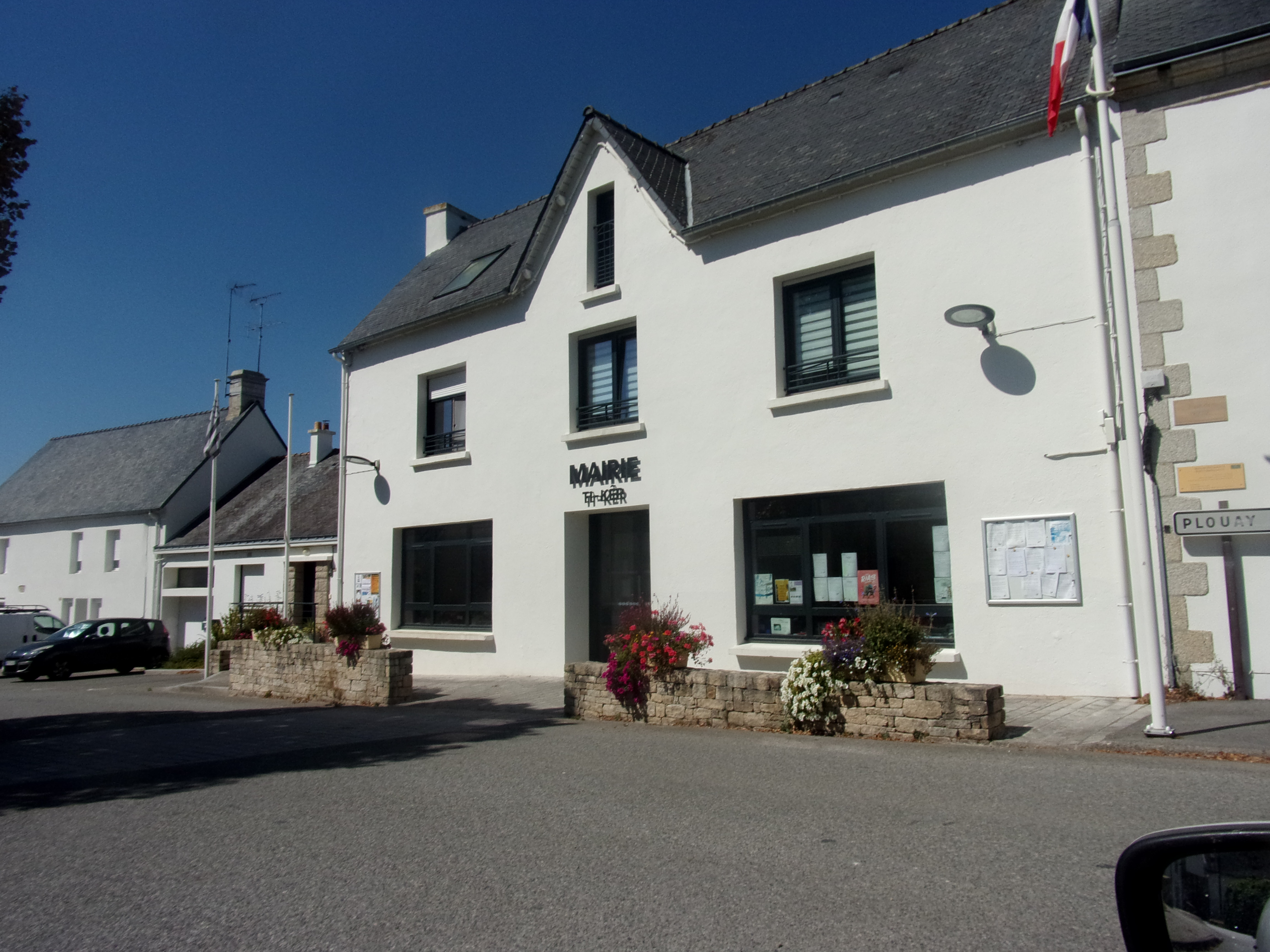
The town hall.

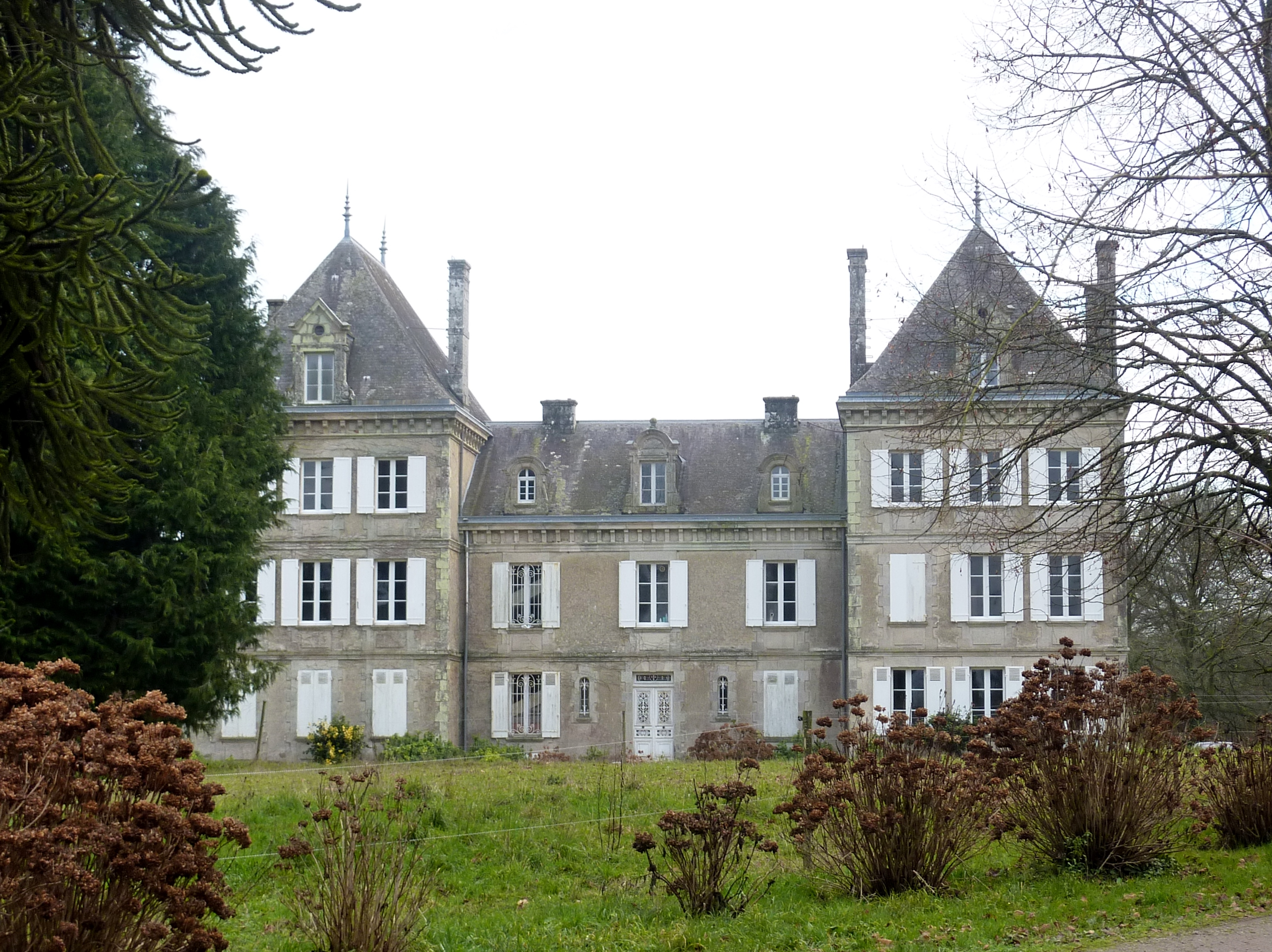
Sach castle.

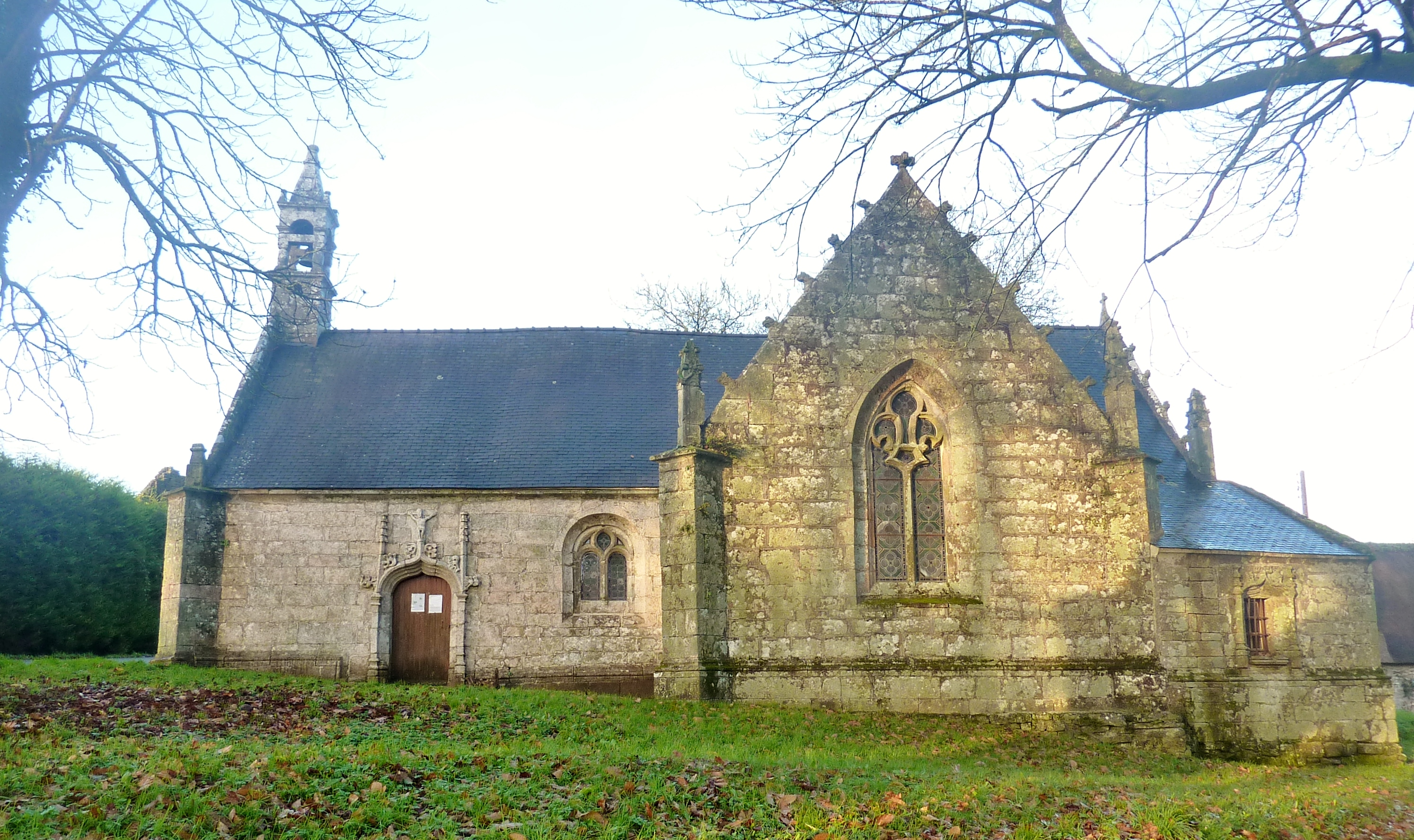
Saint Eloi's chapel.

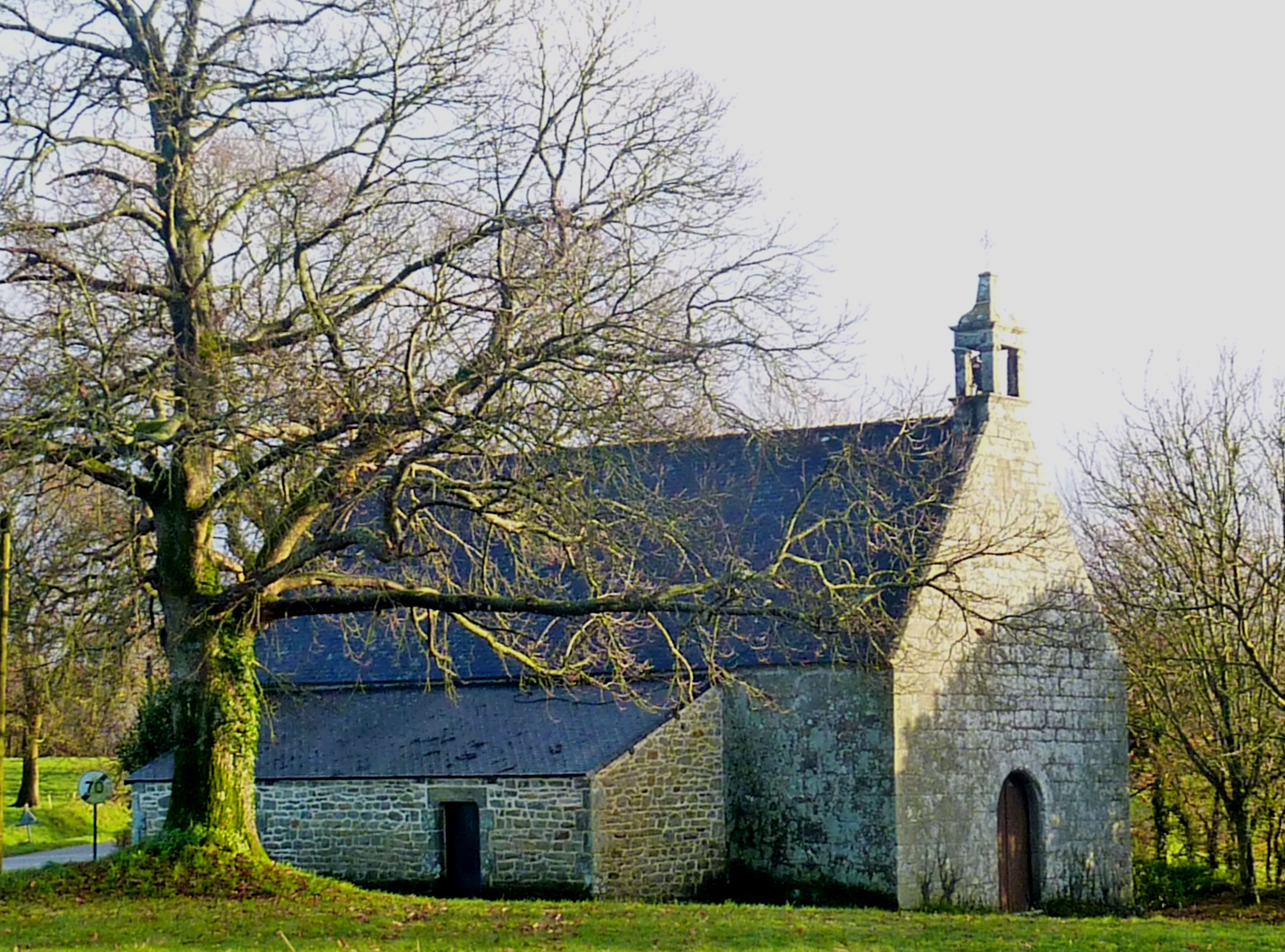
Saint Julien's chapel.

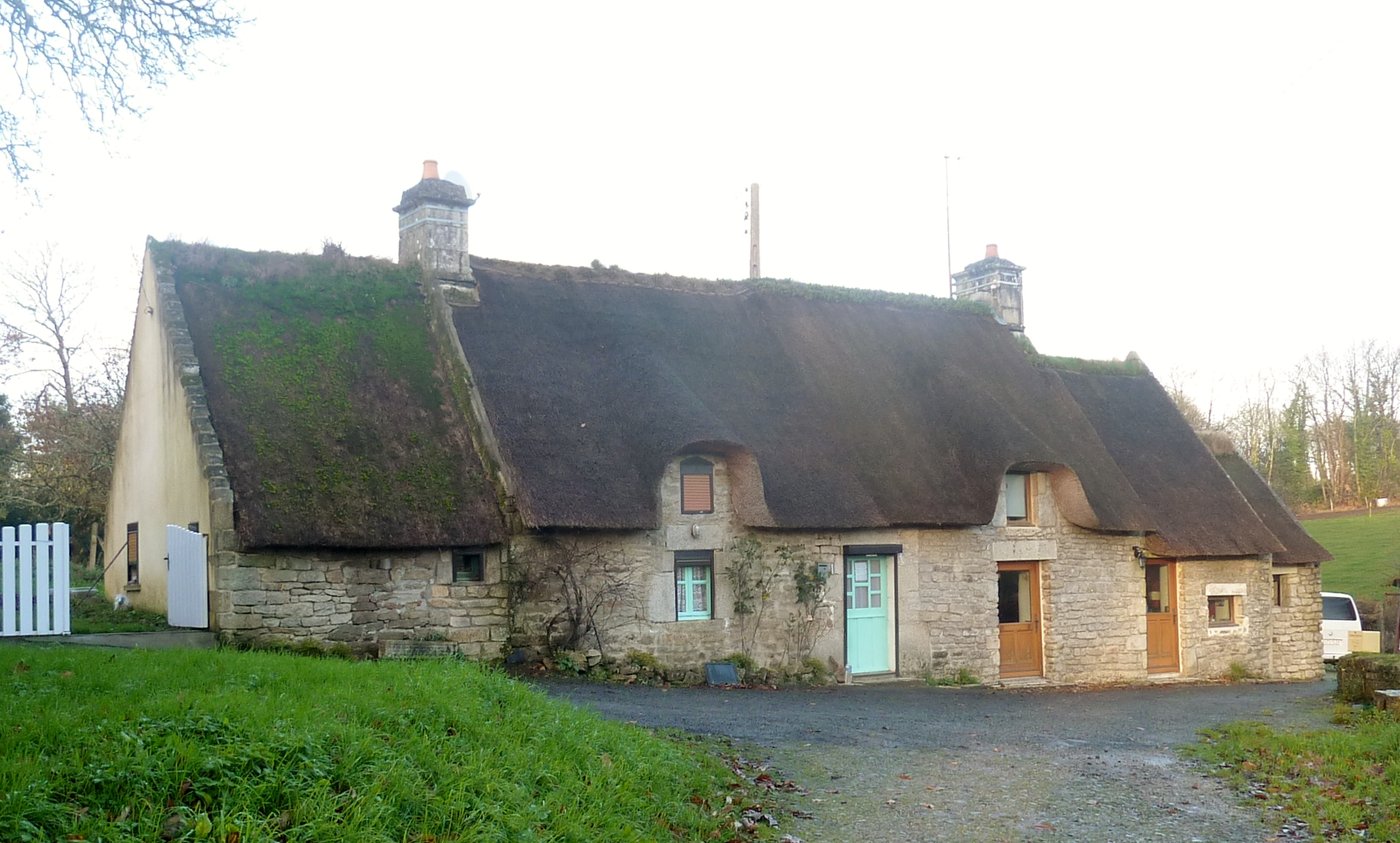
Thatched roof cottage in Saint-Eloi hamlet.

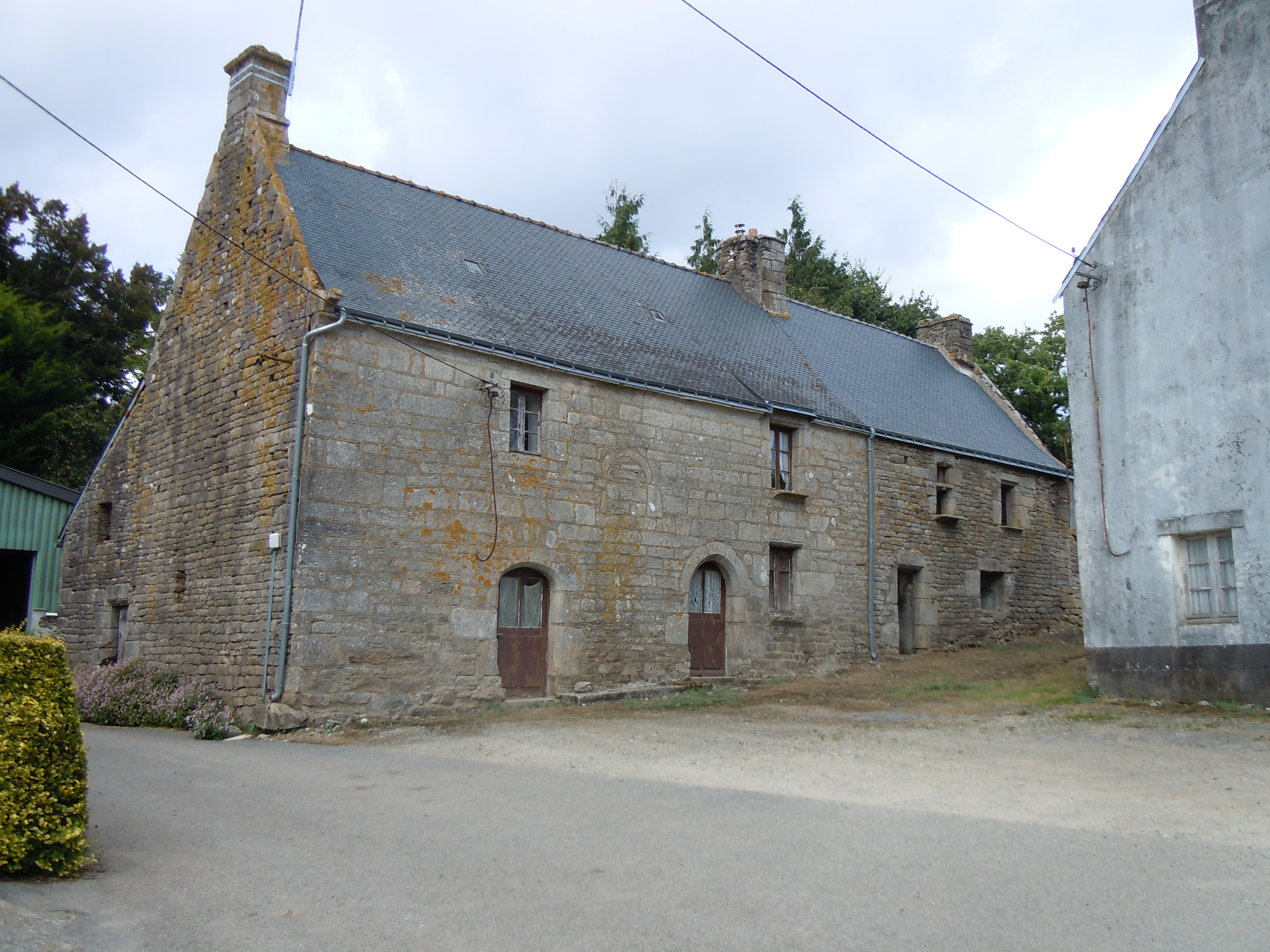
Old house in Saint Coal hamlet.

== See also ==
- Communes of the Finistère department
