= Baye, Finistère =

Baye Bei
- Commune
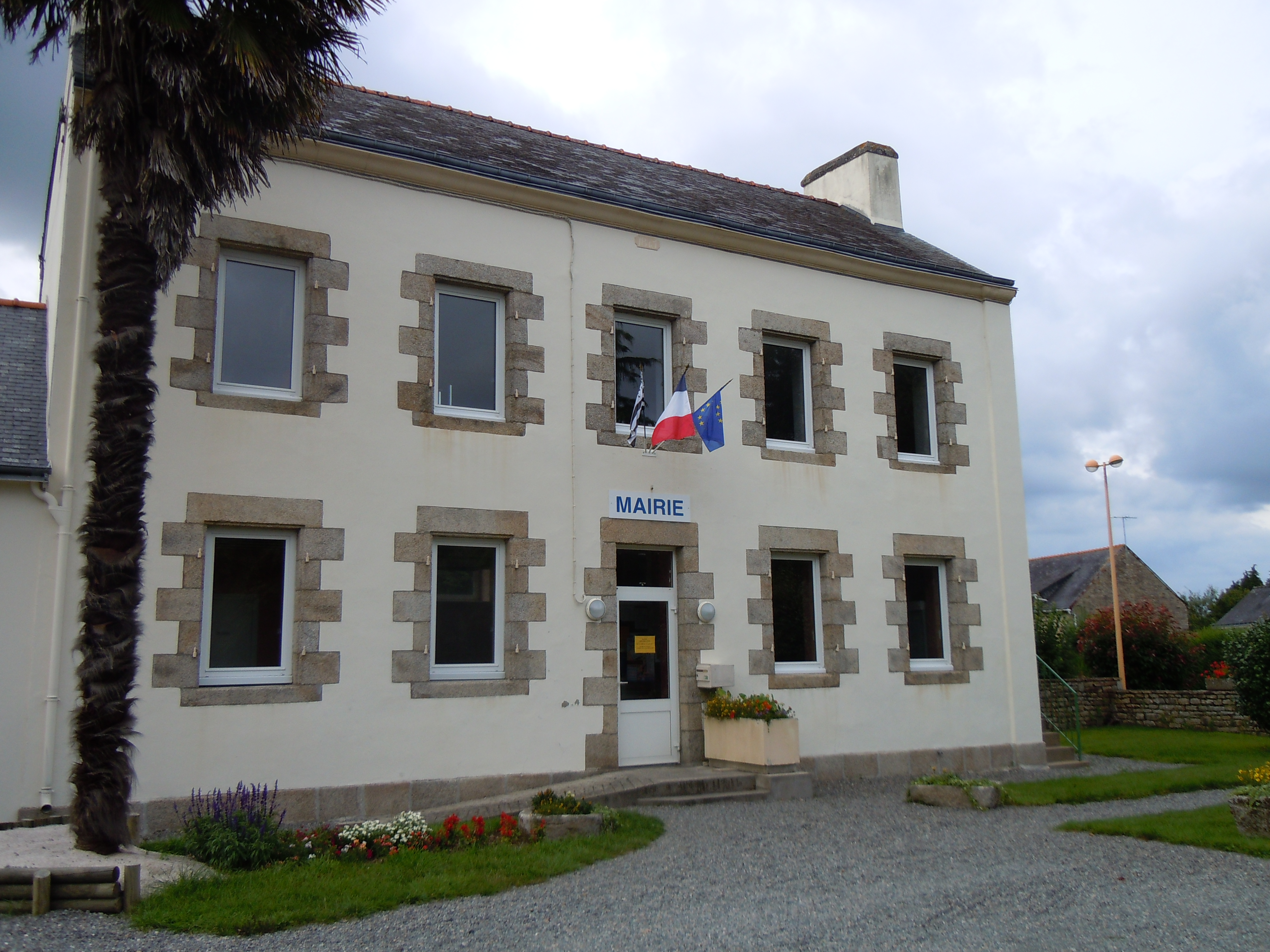
- The town hall in Baye
- Location of Baye
- Location within France Location within Brittany
- Coordinates: 47°51′29″N 3°36′12″W
- Country: France
- Region: Brittany
- Department: Finistère
- Arrondissement: Quimper
- Canton: Quimperlé
- Intercommunality: CA Quimperlé Communauté

Government
  - Mayor (2020–2026): Pascal Bozec
- Area^{1}: 7.29 km^{2} (2.81 sq mi)
- Highest elevation: 70 m (230 ft)
- Lowest elevation: 13 m (43 ft)
- Population (2023): 1,369
  - Density: 188/km^{2} (486/sq mi)
- Time zone: UTC+01:00 (CET)
  - Summer (DST): UTC+02:00 (CEST)
- INSEE/Postal code: 29005 /29300
- ^{1} French Land Register data, which excludes lakes, ponds, glaciers > 1 km^{2} (0.386 sq mi or 247 acres) and river estuaries.

Baye (French pronunciation: [bɛj]; Breton: Bei) is a commune in the Finistère department and administrative region of Brittany in north-western France.

== Population ==
In French the inhabitants of Baye are known as Bayois.

Historical population

Year	Pop.	±% p.a.
1793	380	—
1800	400	+0.74%
1806	347	−2.34%
1831	402	+0.59%
1836	482	+3.70%
1841	495	+0.53%
1846	547	+2.02%
1851	527	−0.74%
1856	492	−1.37%
1861	524	+1.27%
1866	590	+2.40%
1872	529	−1.80%
1876	530	+0.05%
1881	543	+0.49%
1886	600	+2.02%
1891	625	+0.82%
1896	619	−0.19%
1901	649	+0.95%

Year	Pop.	±% p.a.
1906	615	−1.07%
1911	587	−0.93%
1921	540	−0.83%
1926	551	+0.40%
1931	549	−0.07%
1936	544	−0.18%
1946	503	−0.78%
1954	452	−1.33%
1962	438	−0.39%
1968	414	−0.93%
1975	547	+4.06%
1982	781	+5.22%
1990	895	+1.72%
1999	912	+0.21%
2007	1,085	+2.19%
2012	1,137	+0.94%
2017	1,149	+0.21%
2023	1,369	+2.96%

Source: EHESS and INSEE (1968–2023)

== Geography ==
Baye is located in the southeast of Finistère, 4 km (2.5 mi) west of Quimperlé, 21.5 km (13.4 mi) northwest of Lorient and 40 km (25 mi) east of Quimper. Historically, Baye belongs to Cornouaille.

== Map ==
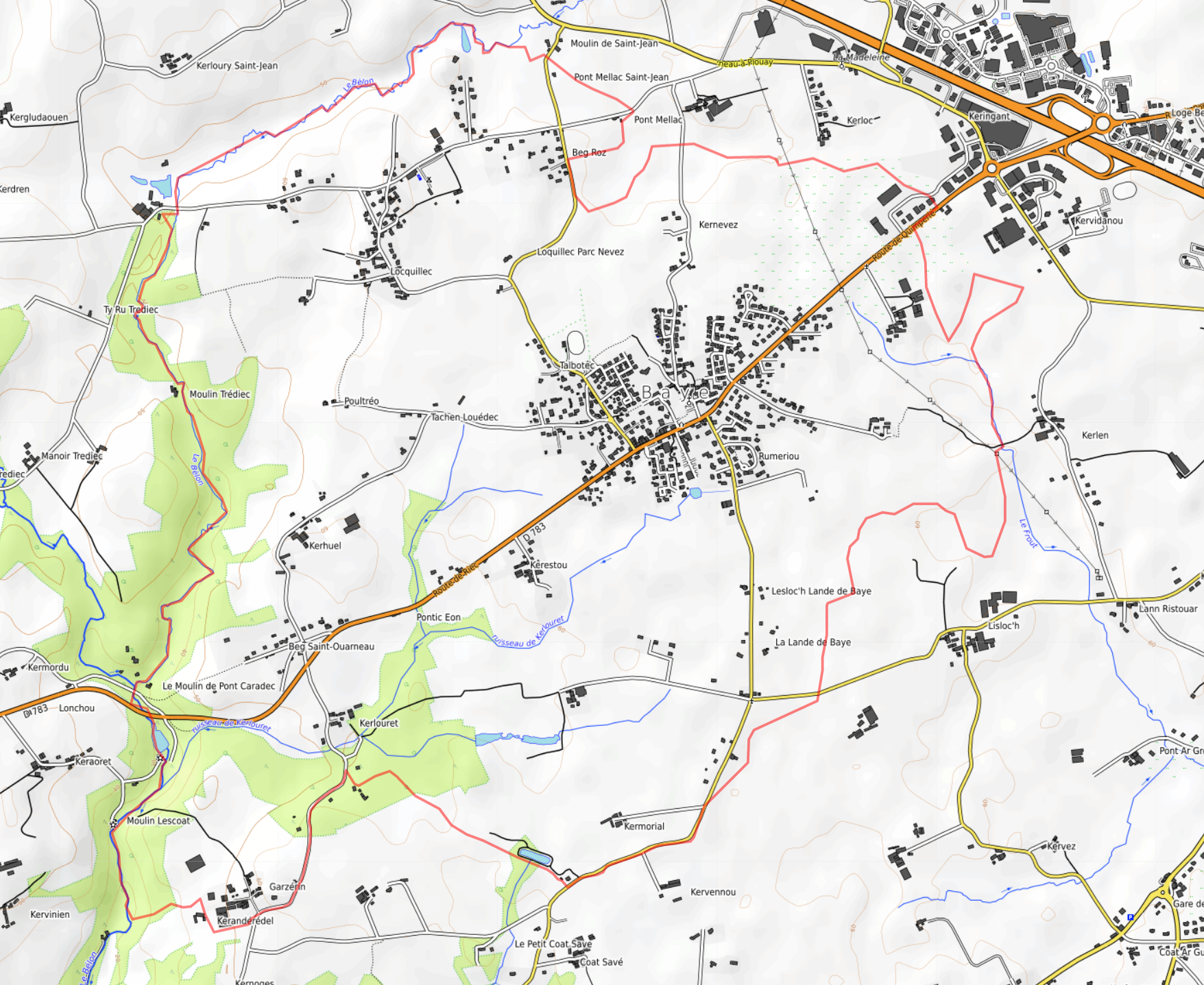
Topographic map.

== Gallery ==
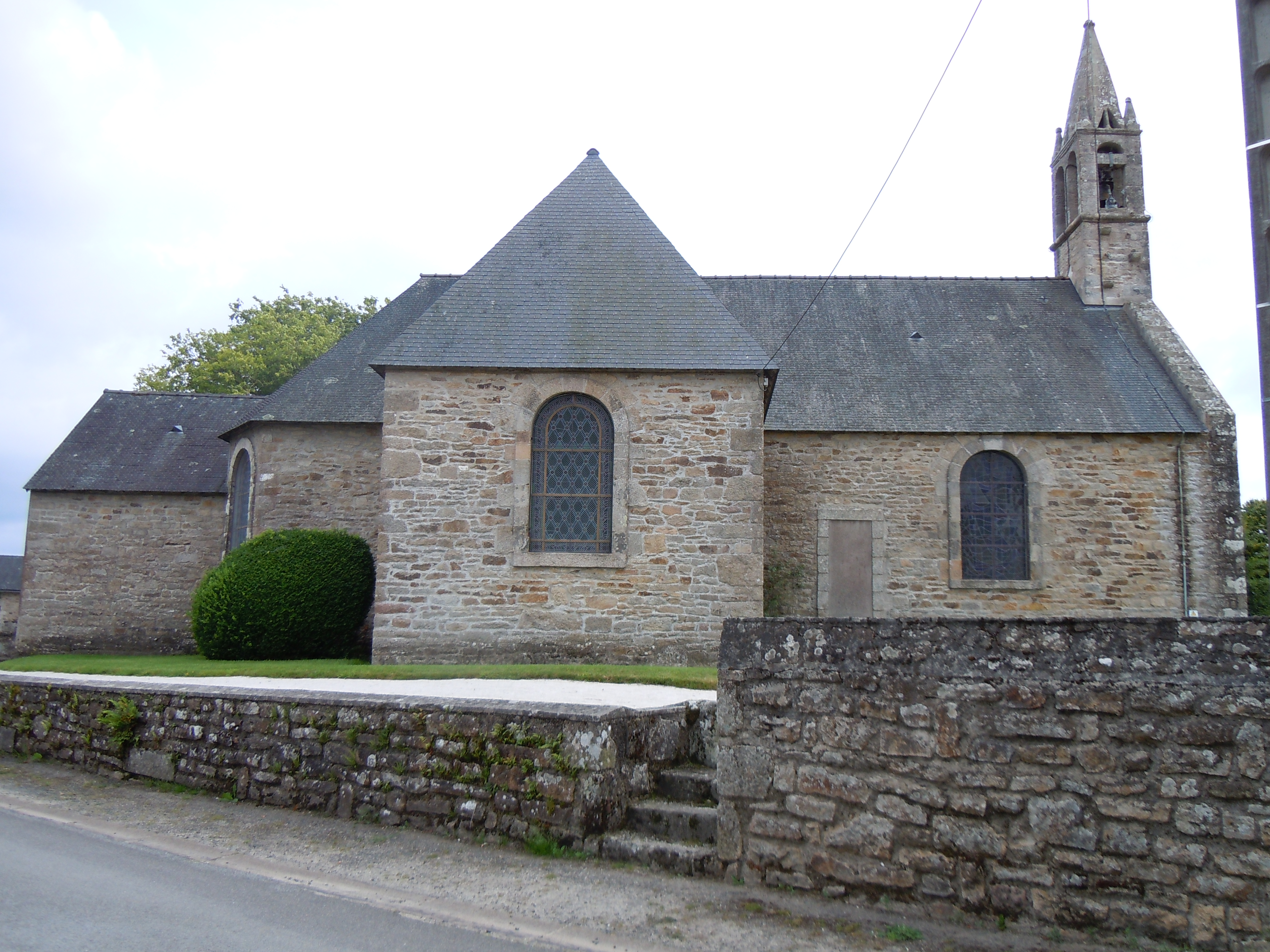
The parish church.

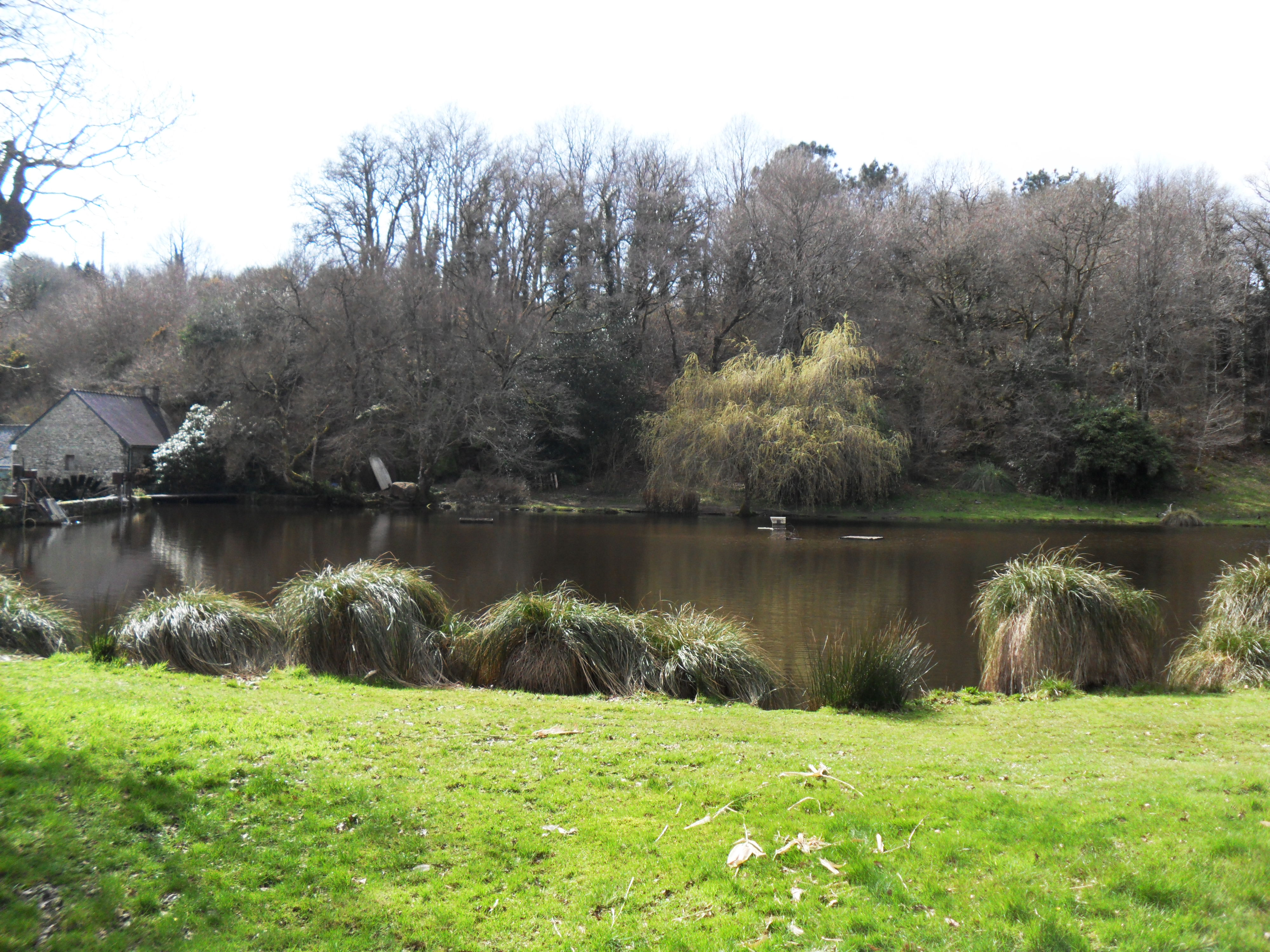
Mill in Baye.

== See also ==
- Communes of the Finistère department
