= Tréméven, Finistère =

Tréméven Tremeven-Kemperle
- Commune
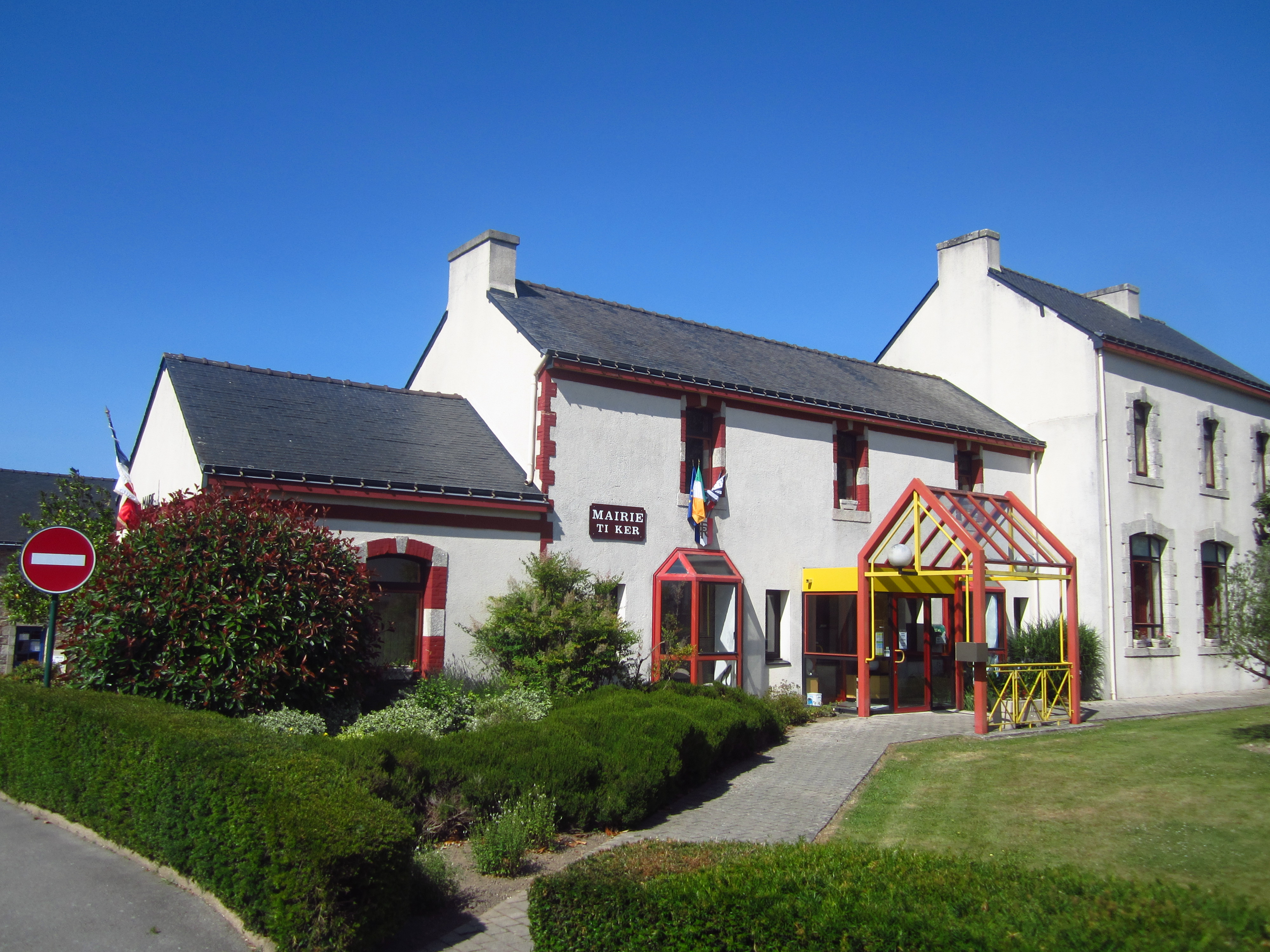
- The town hall in Tréméven
- Location of Tréméven
- Location within France Location within Brittany
- Coordinates: 47°53′57″N 3°31′52″W
- Country: France
- Region: Brittany
- Department: Finistère
- Arrondissement: Quimper
- Canton: Quimperlé
- Intercommunality: CA Quimperlé Communauté

Government
  - Mayor (2020–2026): Monique Caudan
- Area^{1}: 15.42 km^{2} (5.95 sq mi)
- Highest elevation: 97 m (318 ft)
- Lowest elevation: 3 m (9.8 ft)
- Population (2023): 2,402
  - Density: 155.8/km^{2} (403.4/sq mi)
- Time zone: UTC+01:00 (CET)
  - Summer (DST): UTC+02:00 (CEST)
- INSEE/Postal code: 29297 /29300
- ^{1} French Land Register data, which excludes lakes, ponds, glaciers > 1 km^{2} (0.386 sq mi or 247 acres) and river estuaries.

Tréméven (French pronunciation: [tʁemevɛn]; Breton: Tremeven-Kemperle) is a commune in the Finistère department of Brittany in north-western France.

== Population ==
Inhabitants of Tréméven are called in French Trémévénois.

Historical population

Year	Pop.	±% p.a.
1793	670	—
1800	720	+1.03%
1806	722	+0.05%
1821	759	+0.33%
1831	840	+1.02%
1836	855	+0.35%
1841	767	−2.15%
1846	837	+1.76%
1851	849	+0.29%
1856	791	−1.41%
1861	841	+1.23%
1866	873	+0.75%
1872	802	−1.40%
1876	825	+0.71%
1881	942	+2.69%
1886	1,006	+1.32%
1891	1,072	+1.28%
1896	1,143	+1.29%
1901	1,151	+0.14%

Year	Pop.	±% p.a.
1906	1,206	+0.94%
1911	1,182	−0.40%
1921	1,162	−0.17%
1926	1,274	+1.86%
1931	1,372	+1.49%
1936	1,304	−1.01%
1946	1,394	+0.67%
1954	1,400	+0.05%
1962	1,402	+0.02%
1968	1,445	+0.50%
1975	1,652	+1.93%
1982	1,975	+2.58%
1990	2,076	+0.63%
1999	2,017	−0.32%
2007	2,063	+0.28%
2012	2,282	+2.04%
2017	2,324	+0.37%
2023	2,402	+0.55%

Source: EHESS and INSEE (1968-2023)

== Map ==
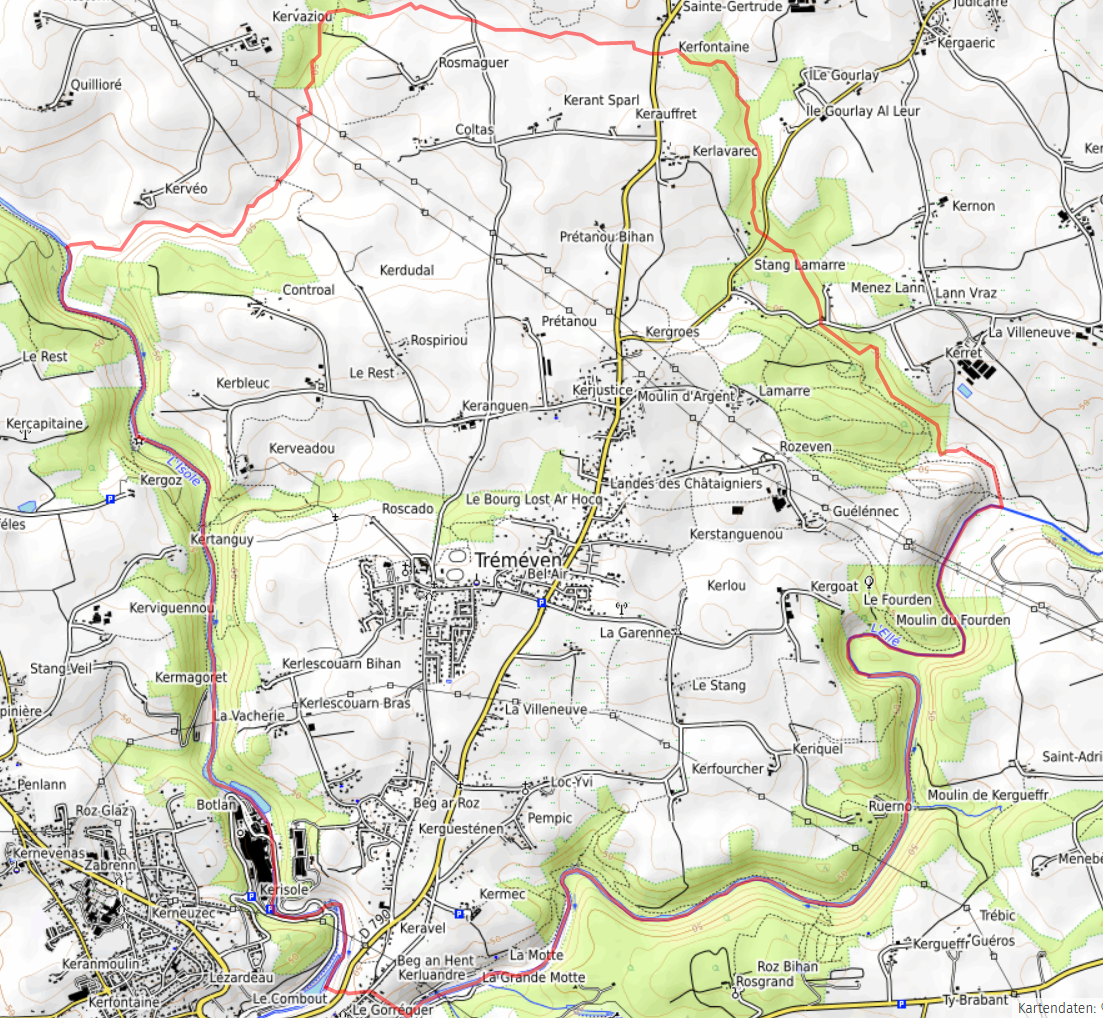
Topographic map

== Breton language ==
The municipality launched a linguistic plan through Ya d'ar brezhoneg on 8 March 2005.

In 2008, 24.11% of primary-school children attended bilingual schools.

== International relations ==
Treméven is twinned with the village of Monivea in Ireland.

== See also ==
- Communes of the Finistère department
- Entry on sculptor of Tréméven war memorial Jean Joncourt
