= Névez =

Névez Nevez
- Commune
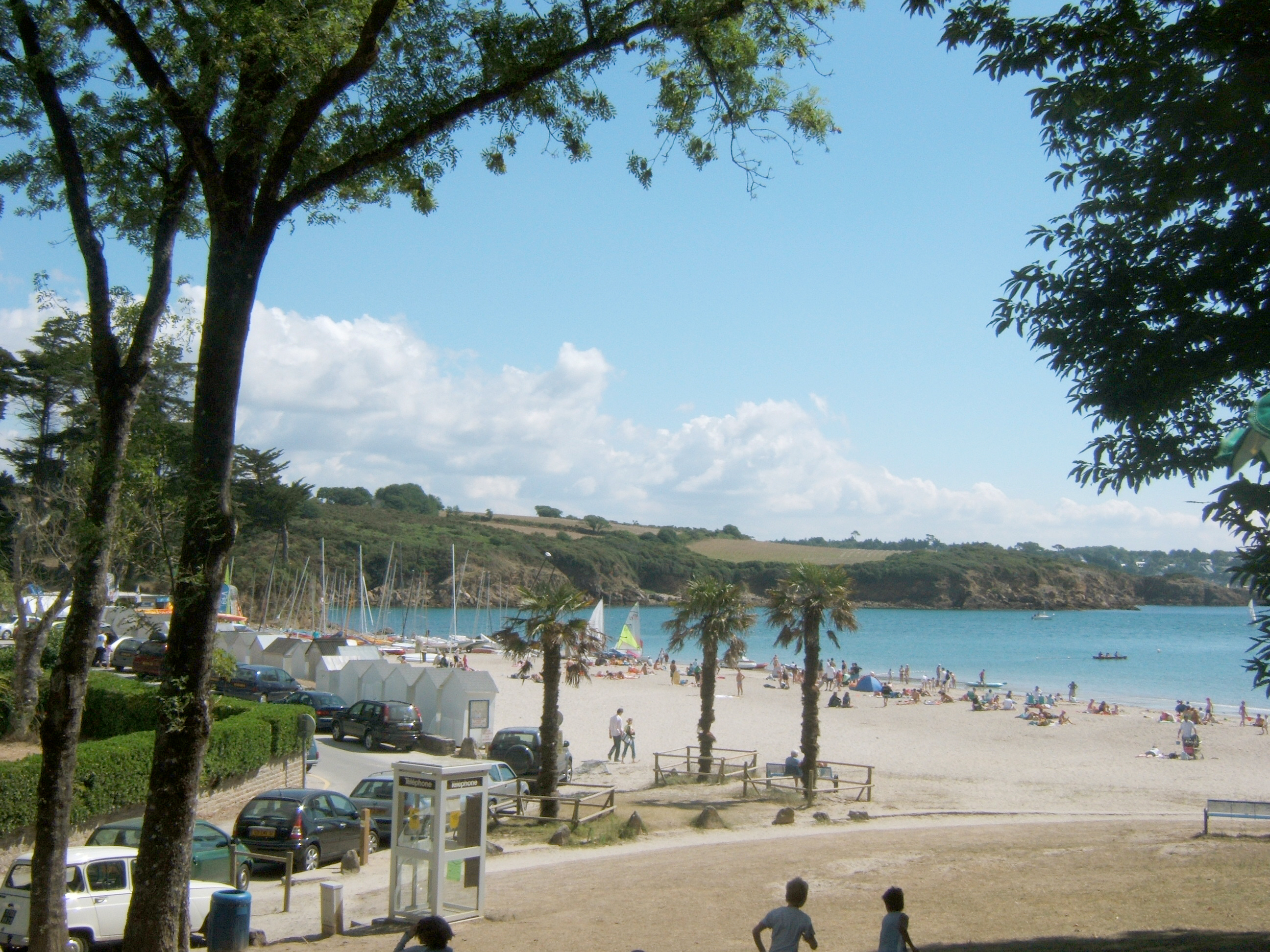
- The beach at Port-Manec'h
- Location of Névez
- Location within France Location within Brittany
- Coordinates: 47°49′13″N 3°47′28″W
- Country: France
- Region: Brittany
- Department: Finistère
- Arrondissement: Quimper
- Canton: Moëlan-sur-Mer
- Intercommunality: Concarneau Cornouaille Agglomération

Government
  - Mayor (2020–2026): Dominique Guillou
- Area^{1}: 25.37 km^{2} (9.80 sq mi)
- Highest elevation: 48 m (157 ft)
- Lowest elevation: 0 m (0 ft)
- Population (2023): 2,795
  - Density: 110.2/km^{2} (285.3/sq mi)
- Time zone: UTC+01:00 (CET)
  - Summer (DST): UTC+02:00 (CEST)
- INSEE/Postal code: 29153 /29920
- ^{1} French Land Register data, which excludes lakes, ponds, glaciers > 1 km^{2} (0.386 sq mi or 247 acres) and river estuaries.

Névez (French pronunciation: [neve]; Breton: Nevez) is a commune in the Finistère department of Brittany, in north-western France.

Nevez means "new" in Breton. The name is thought to have arisen when Trégunc was split in two in 1078, creating a new parish.

== Population ==
Inhabitants of Névez are called Néveziens. Névez has become a popular tourist destination in recent years, with the population in summer going 2700 to upwards of 20 000 in summer.

== Economy ==
Historically, the inhabitants of Névez have heavily relied on fishing and agriculture. Today, Névez is among the 10 most expensive communes to buy property in Brittany and relies mainly on the tourism industry.

Historical population

Year	Pop.	±% p.a.
1793	1,560	—
1800	1,638	+0.70%
1806	1,355	−3.11%
1821	1,487	+0.62%
1831	1,450	−0.25%
1836	1,923	+5.81%
1841	1,836	−0.92%
1846	2,040	+2.13%
1851	2,073	+0.32%
1856	2,084	+0.11%
1861	2,111	+0.26%
1866	2,221	+1.02%
1872	2,174	−0.36%
1876	2,344	+1.90%
1881	2,454	+0.92%
1886	2,487	+0.27%
1891	2,605	+0.93%
1896	2,660	+0.42%
1901	2,818	+1.16%

Year	Pop.	±% p.a.
1906	2,922	+0.73%
1911	3,203	+1.85%
1921	3,039	−0.52%
1926	3,140	+0.66%
1931	3,220	+0.50%
1936	3,214	−0.04%
1946	3,046	−0.54%
1954	3,160	+0.46%
1962	3,127	−0.13%
1968	3,111	−0.09%
1975	2,895	−1.02%
1982	2,700	−0.99%
1990	2,574	−0.60%
1999	2,466	−0.48%
2007	2,641	+0.86%
2012	2,717	+0.57%
2017	2,661	−0.42%
2023	2,795	+0.82%

Source: EHESS and INSEE (1968-2023)

== Map ==
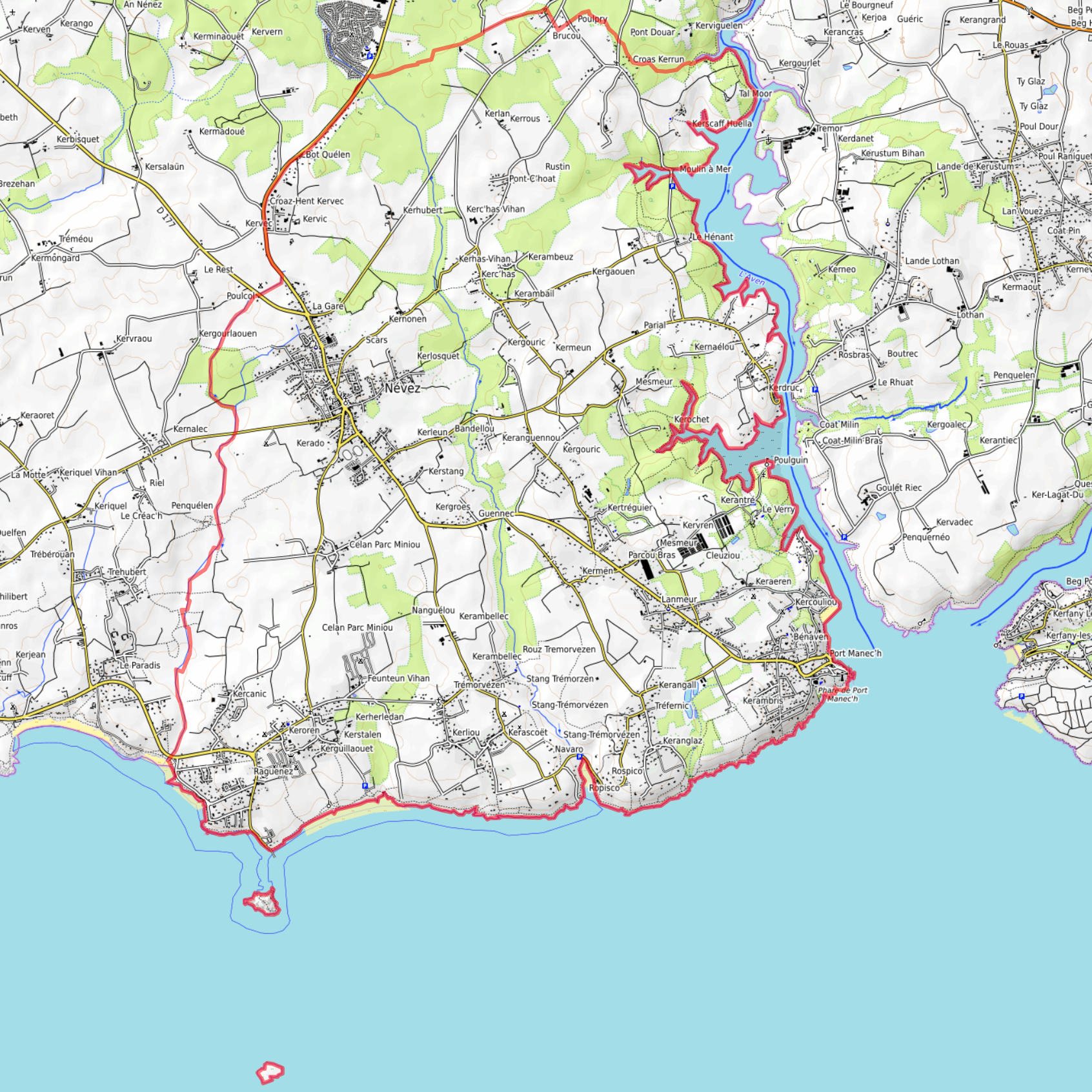
Topographic map

== Notable people ==
- Marie Pommepuy (b. 1978), illustrator and half of the joint pen name Kerascoët, grew up in Névez
- Stéphane Amalir, director of the Alliance française in Delhi, India.

== Gallery ==
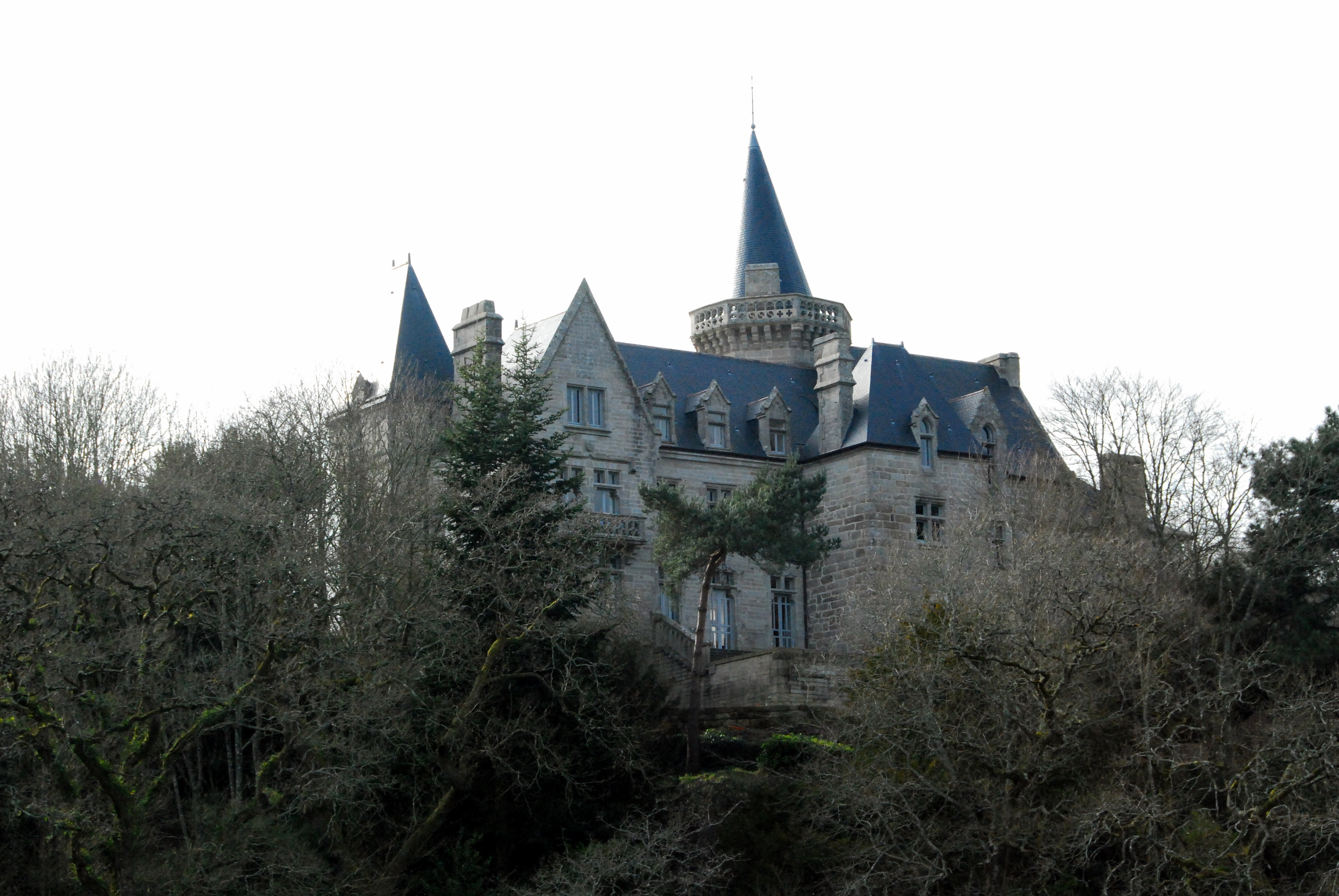
Hénan Castle

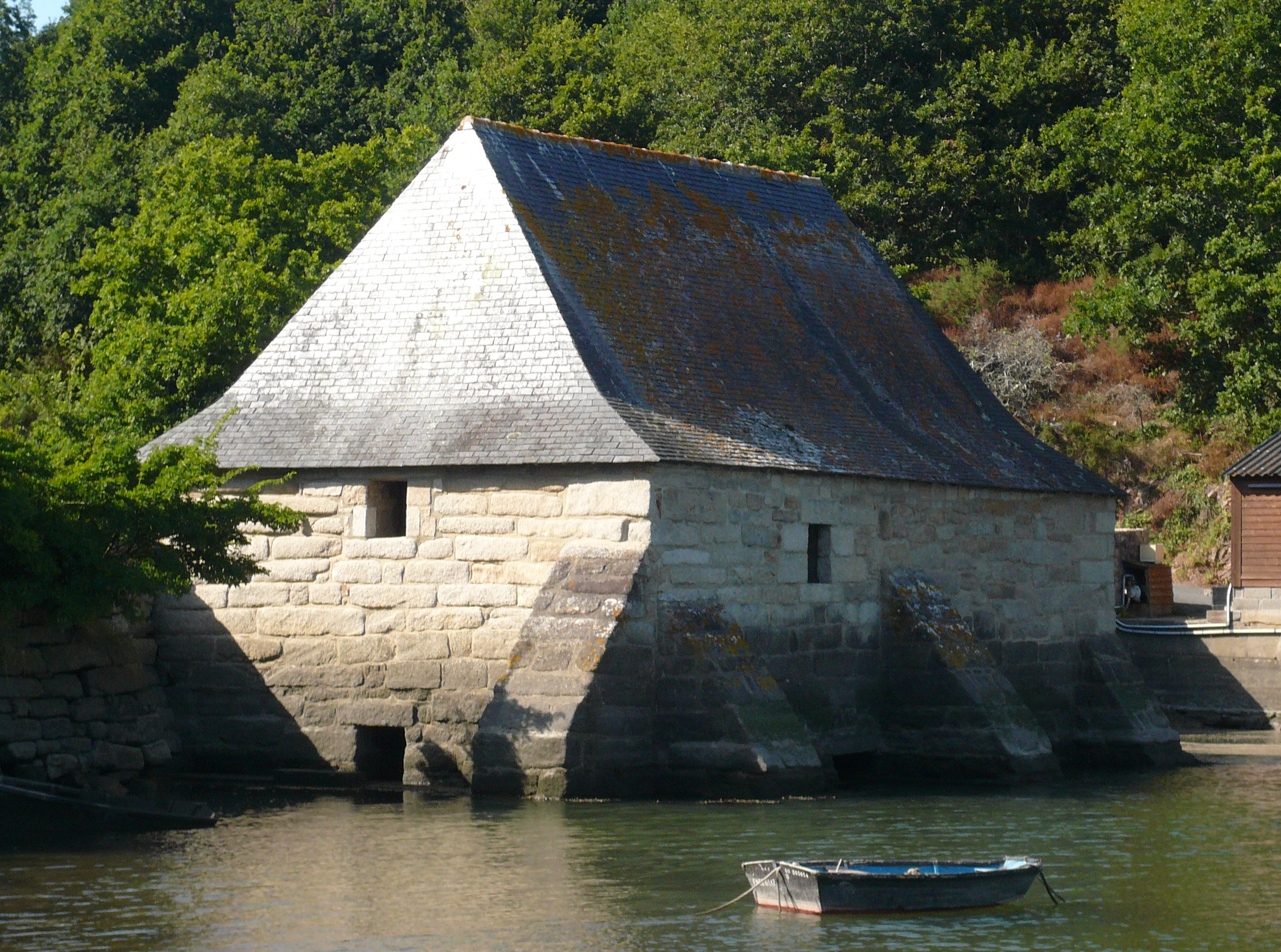
Tide mill of Hénan

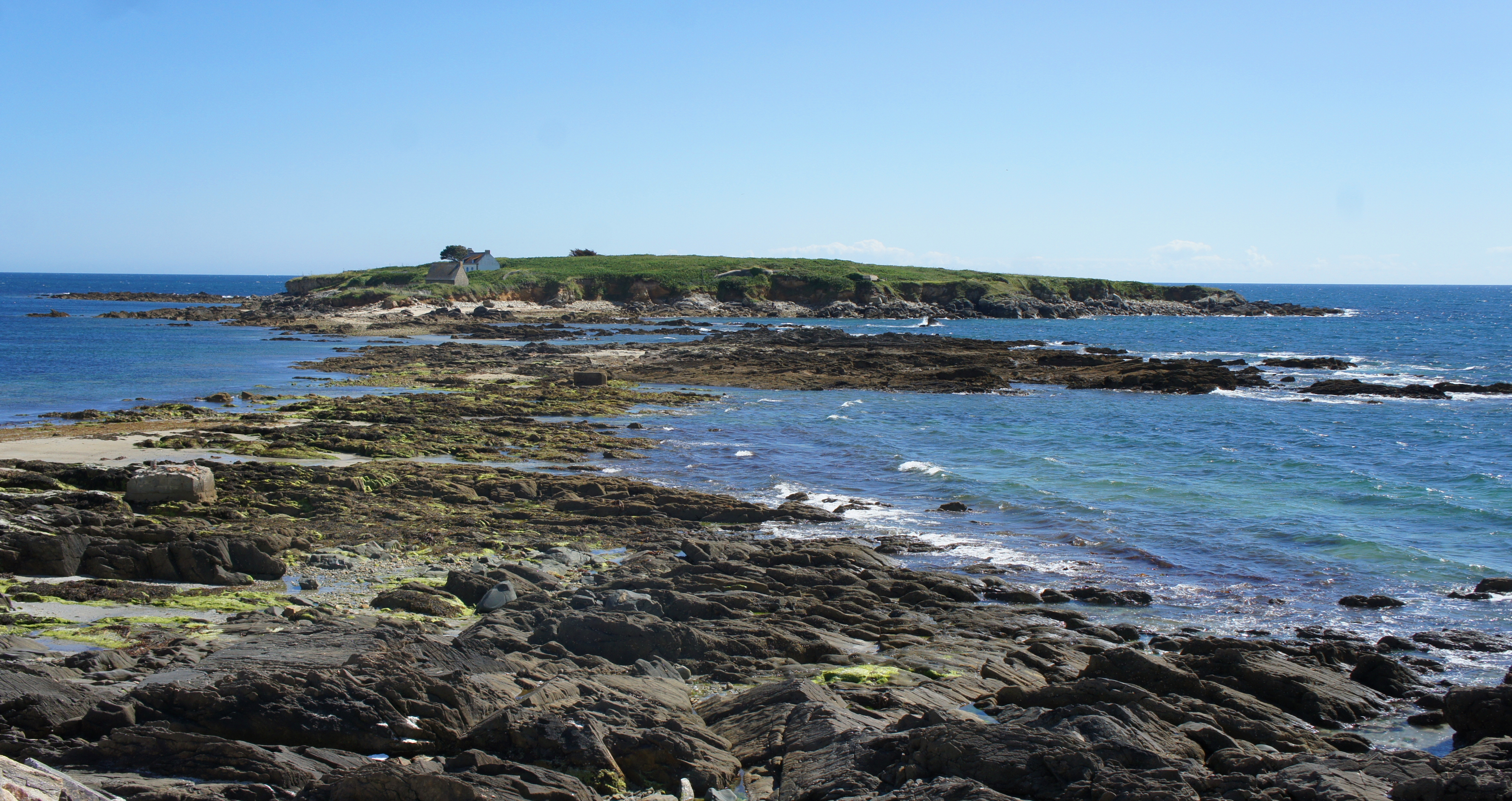
Raguénez island

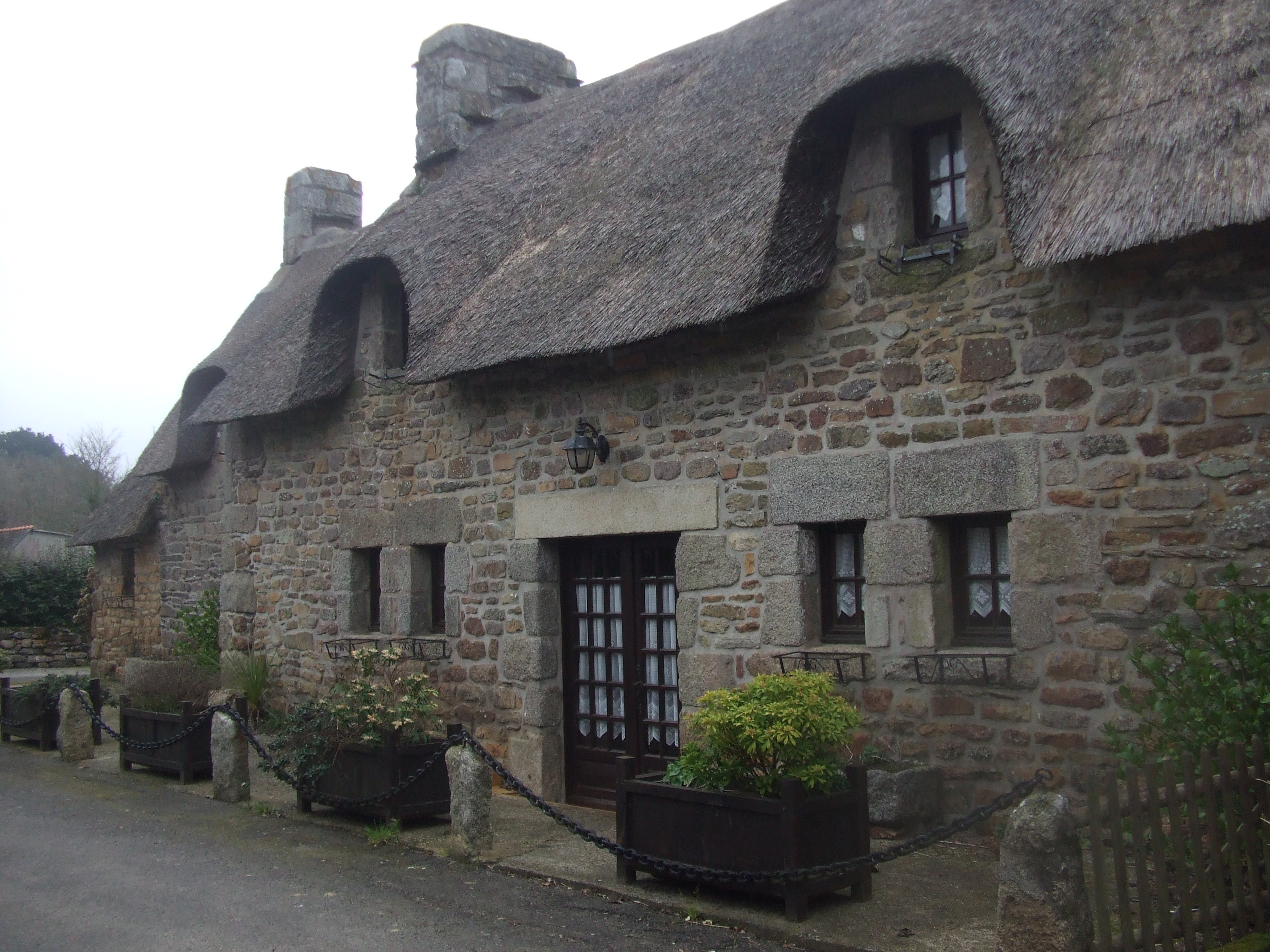
Thatched roof cottage in Kerascoët village

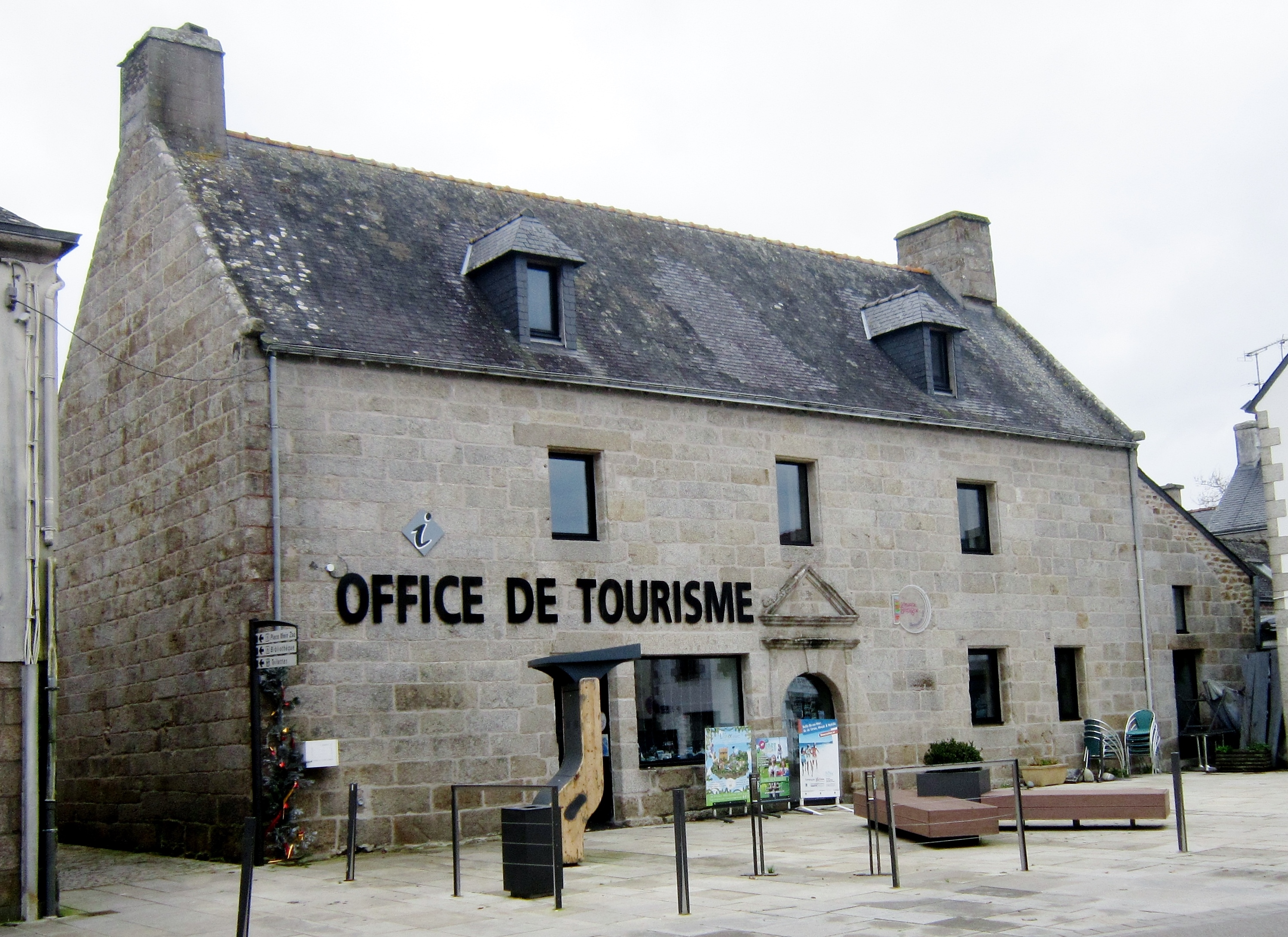
Tourist office

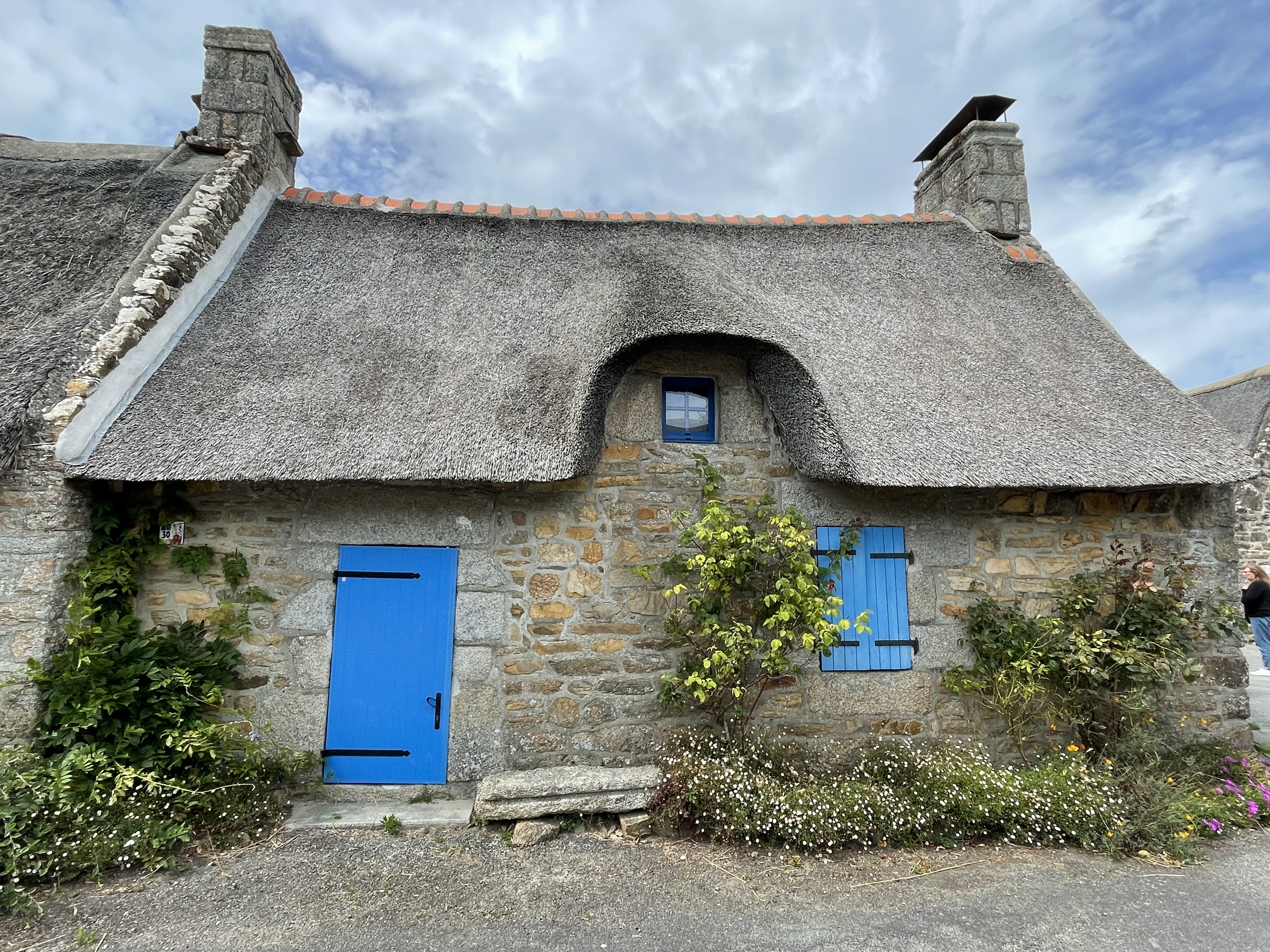
Kerascoët village

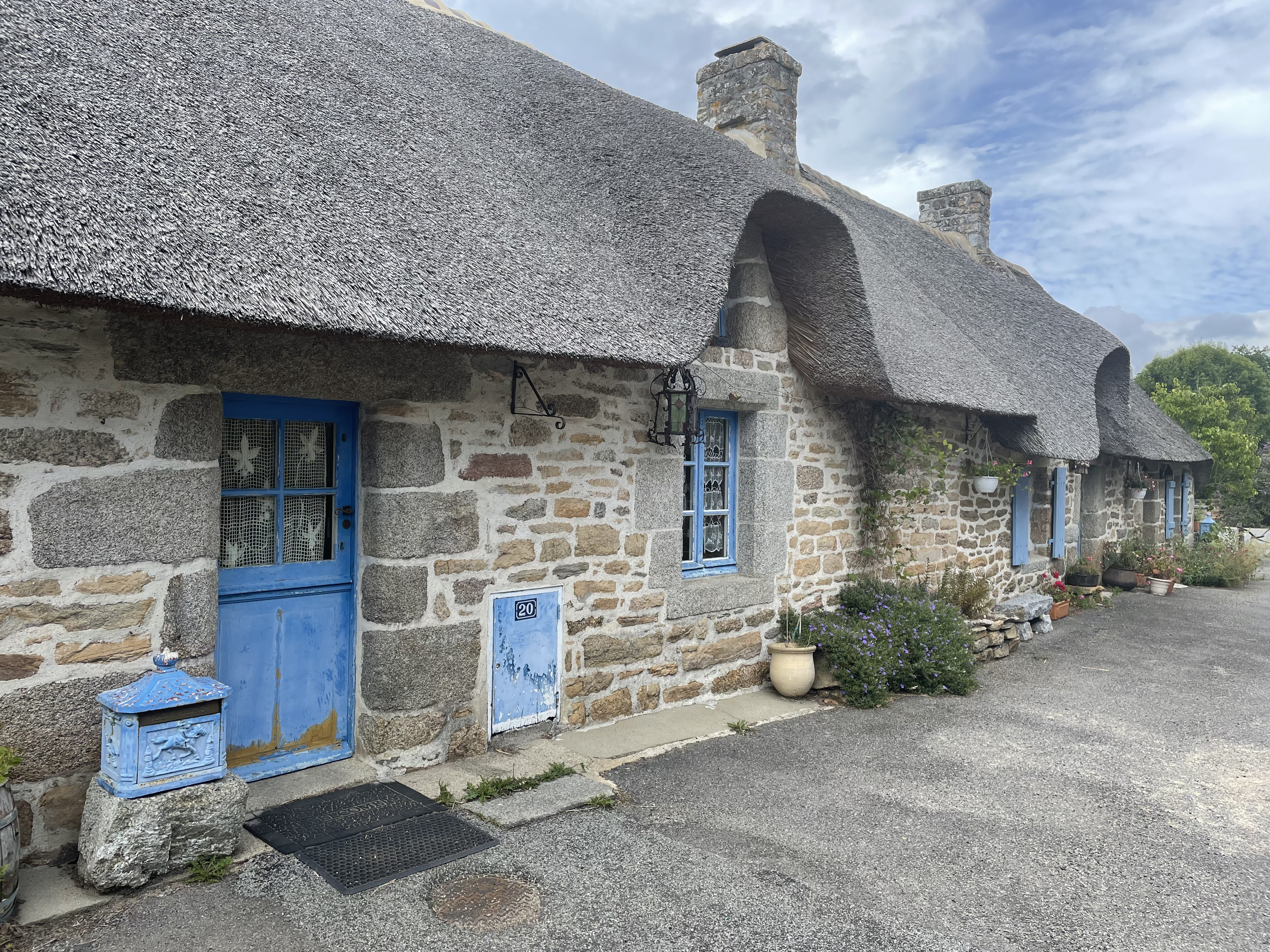
Kerascoët village

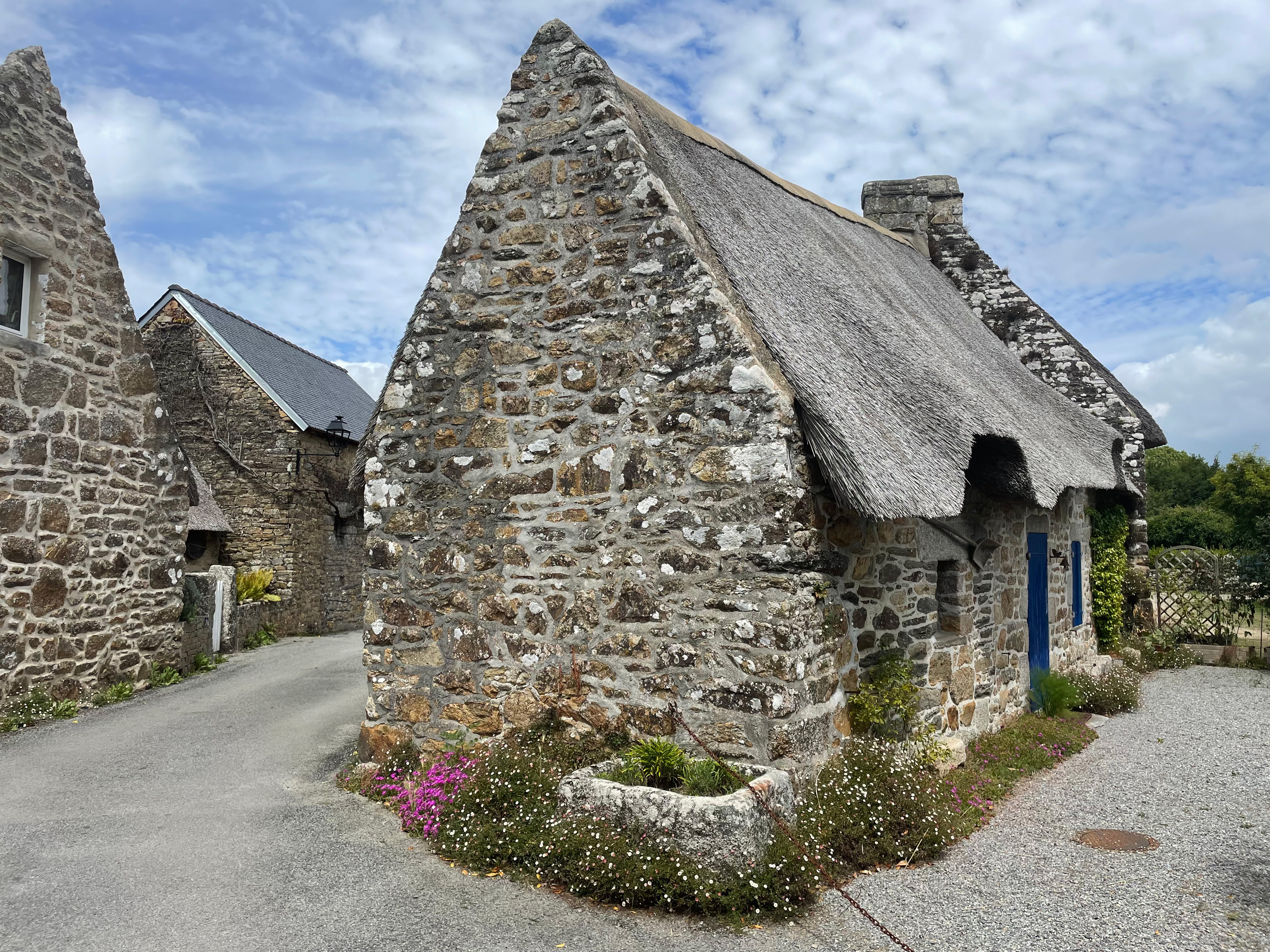
Kerascoët village

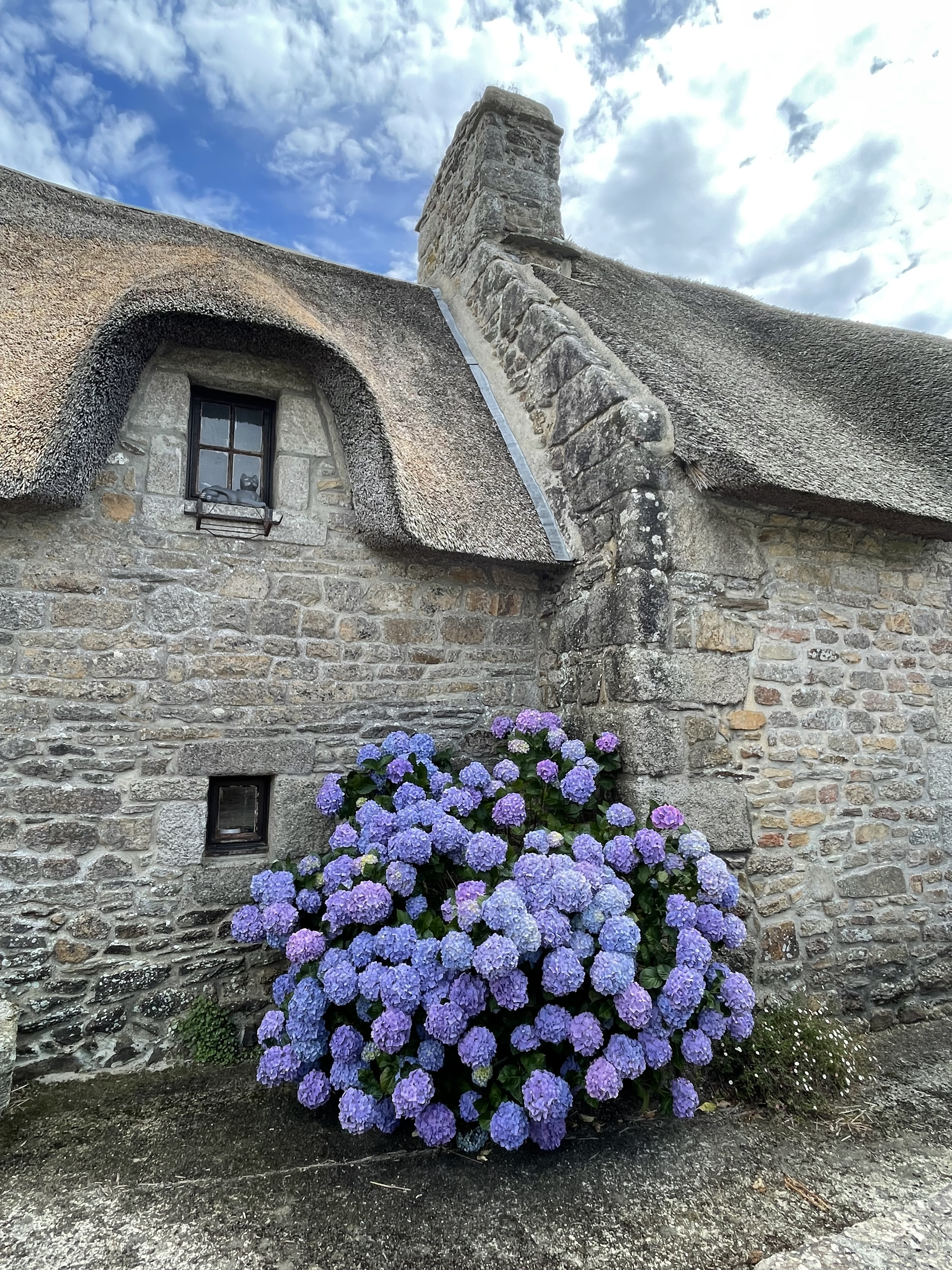
Kerascoët village

== See also ==
- Communes of the Finistère department
- Entry on sculptor of Névez war memorial Jean Joncourt
