= Jean Joncourt =

French sculptor

- Born: Jean Joncourt; 31 December 1869; Irvillac, France
- Died: 1937
- Occupation: Sculptor

Jean Joncourt (1869 in Irvillac – 1937) was a French sculptor. He is well known for his work on war memorials.

== Biography ==
Jean Joncourt was born in Irvillac on 31 December 1869. There is no record of his having received any academic training in sculpture and at the age of 20 he was registered as a mason. He was called up for military service and served in the 1st Regiment of Engineers from November 1890 to September 1891. In 1896 he moved to Quimperlé and married Marie Marguerite Derrien, who had been born in Clohars-Carnoët in 1872. The census of 1911 recorded Joncourt as working as a sculptor, with a daughter born in 1897, a son in 1903 and a second daughter in 1904. In 1914 he received mobilization papers and is recorded as having served in April 1915 in the 1st Battalion Territorial Engineers and then the 65th Infantry moving on to the 23rd "Escadron du Train". In October 1917, Joncourt appears in official records as running a funeral parlour in Quimperlé's rue Savary. He worked on war memorials and funereal sculpture and appears at one time to have run a building business. Most of his war memorials use the same sculptural decoration. These are dealt with below

== War memorials ==
After the 1914-1918 war there was a huge demand for war memorials and many required the services of a sculptor. Joncourt worked on many in the canton of Quimperlé where he was a resident. There was in fact a general rule adopted that the sculptors chosen to work on any particular communes war memorial would have been born in, or lived in, or had some familial tie to that commune. Joncourt is credited with involvement with all the Quimperlé area's war memorials except Quimperlé itself where the war memorial, located in Saint David's cemetery, has a sculpture made by the Marbreries générales Gourdon de Paris who were one of the many firms in France who actually marketed sculptures specifically for war memorials and published a catalogue for marketing purposes. Their sculpture for Quimperlé was unusually a one/off composition just created for the Quimperlé memorial. Joncourt is credited with working on the war memorials of Querrien, Saint-Thurien, Tréméven, Névez, Baye, Mellac and Quéven in Morbihan. He worked in kersantite and given the modest budgets of such rural communities kept his work to a soldier in either bas-relief or haut relief on the obelisk's main face with a Croix de Guerre a marine anchor or suitable republican symbols added.

=== Baye War Memorial ===
Located in the cemetery of the Église paroissiale Saint-Pierre-aux-Liens is the 1921 Baye war memorial with sculptural decoration by Joncourt. The inscription is in both Breton and French.

"DA BUGALE BAYE MARO EVIT AR VRO/Aux Enfants de Baye morts pour la France"

Joncourt carves on the monument in bas-relief the head of a helmeted soldier. The soldier has the Croix de Guerre on a ribbon around his neck and another larger Croix de Guerre sits on the top of the monument. .

=== Tréméven War Memorial ===
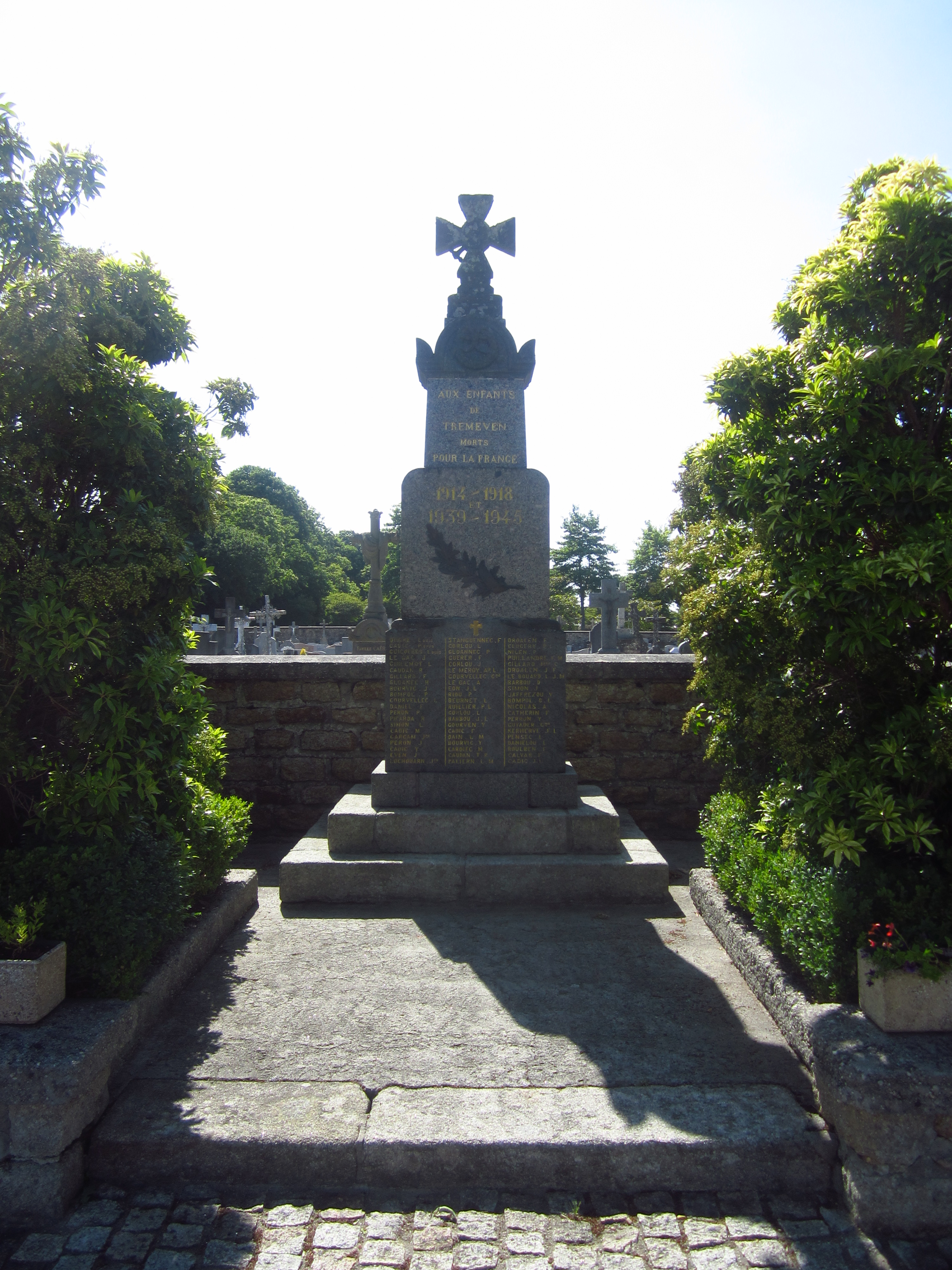
Tréméven war memorial or monument aux morts. The Croix de Guerre and laurel leaf can be seen

In the cemetery next to the Église paroissiale Saint-Méen is Tréméven's war memorial which dates to 1920. Joncourt carried out the sculptural decoration in kersantite. He depicts a croix de guerre and a laurel leaf and the inscription reads

" Aux enfants de Tréméven, morts pour la France. J. Joncourt, Quimperlé. F. Caeric, maire"

84 men of Tréméven gave their lives in the two World Wars.

=== Querrien War Memorial ===
The Querrien War Memorial stands in a small commune that lost 158 men. Joncourt uses his stock profile of a standing soldier with rifle and also adds a bas-relief depicting a field gun and a flaming torch. He uses kersantite.

=== Saint-Thurien War Memorial ===
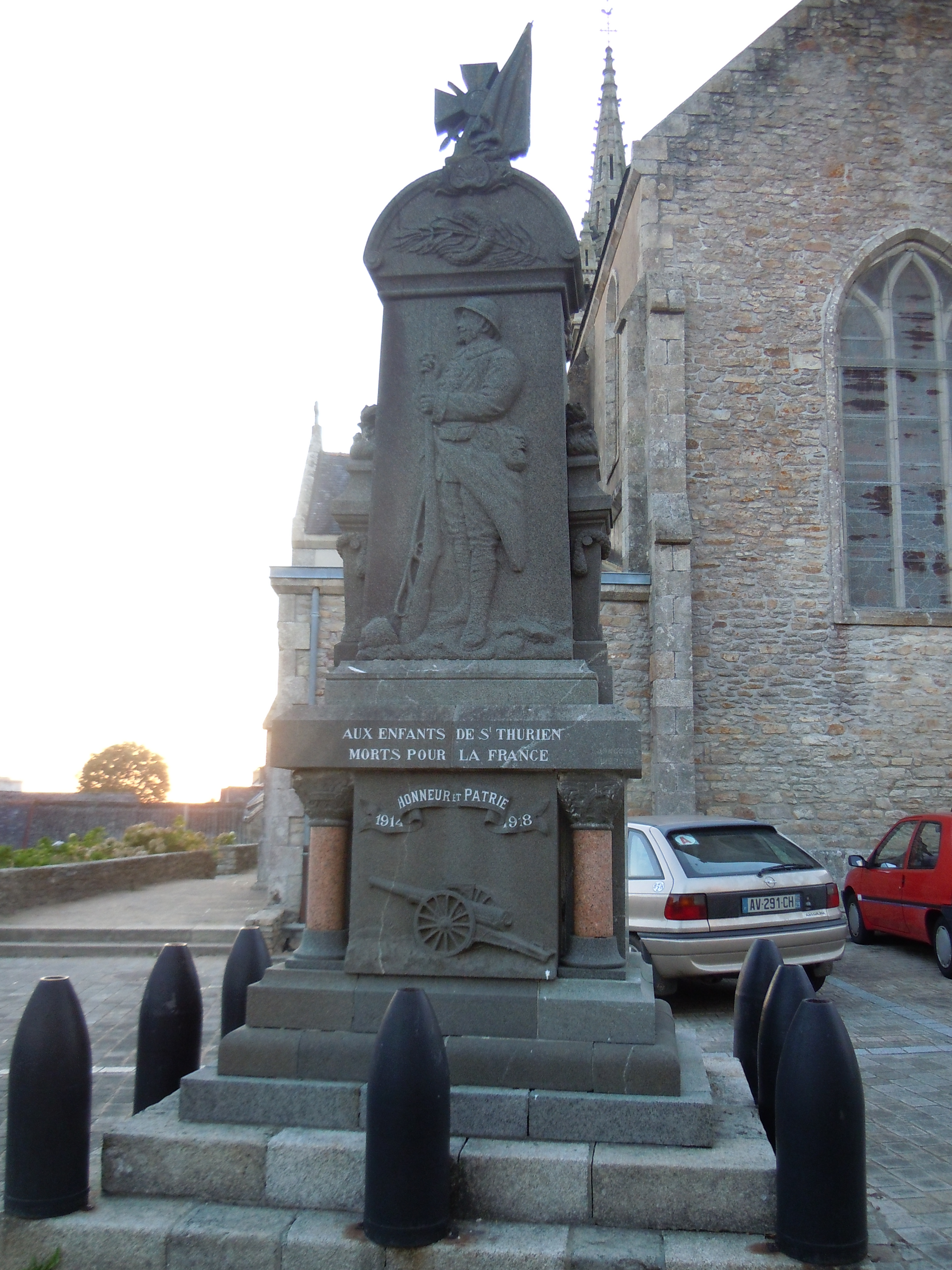
Saint-Thurien war memorial with Jean Joncourt's relief depicting a standing soldier. At the top of the memorial Joncourt places the Croix de Guerre and a flag and on the obelisk adds a bas-relief featuring an artillery piece

Inaugurated 1 May 1921 the Saint-Thurien War Memorial repeats the sculptural decoration used for Clohars-Carnoët, Querrien, Quéven, Penhars, Kernevel, Roudouallec and Le Trévoux

=== Penhars War Memorial ===
This memorial stands in Penhars' cemetery and was inaugurated on the 6 November 1921.

=== Kernével War Memorial ===
Inaugurated 17 April 1922. 181 men from this commune gave their lives in the two World Wars.

=== Quéven War Memorial ===
The Quéven War Memorial is a repeat of the Saint Thueren sculpture.

=== Névez War Memorial ===
Inaugurated 17 July 1921, the Névez War Memorial using kersantite, depicts a soldier holding a flag whilst a sailor looks on. The memorial has a bas-relief depicting a cannon and the Croix de Guerre at the top.

=== Plobannalec-Lesconil War Memorial ===
Inaugurated 3 April 1923, the Plobannalec-Lesconil War Memorial depicts a standing soldier with rifle with the Croix de Guerre at the top and a bas-relief depicting a cannon.

=== Rédené War Memorial ===
Erected in 1920, the Rédené War Memorial, topped with a depiction of Christ on the Cross, has a kersantite relief by Joncourt depicting a flag and sword. The inscription reads

"Honneur et patrie au Rédennois morts pour la France, 1914-1918"

A total of 72 names are listed with a few being of men killed in the 1939-1945 conflict.

=== Arzano, Finistère War Memorial ===
The Arzano, Finistère War Memorial depicts a helmeted soldier about to throw a grenade. The work is in Kersanite and the inscription reads

"Aux enfants d'Arzano morts pour la France"

The war memorial stands in front of the Arzano parish church and remembers the 81 men killed in the 1914-1918 war.

=== Clohars-Carnoët War Memorial ===
The Clohars-Carnoët War Memorial stands at the entrance to the Clohars-Carnoët cemetery and Joncourt uses his depiction of a soldier with rifle a work he was to use often and adds at the request of the commune a crowing cockerel at the top of the memorial the bird having one claw on a globe on which is written "Liberté", and an anchor recalling the role of the sea in the lives of the 150 men remembered. On each side of the triumphant cockerel are the heads of two women. One is a widow wearing a Breton headress whilst other is a "Marianne" type figure representing the republic.

=== Locunolé War Memorial ===
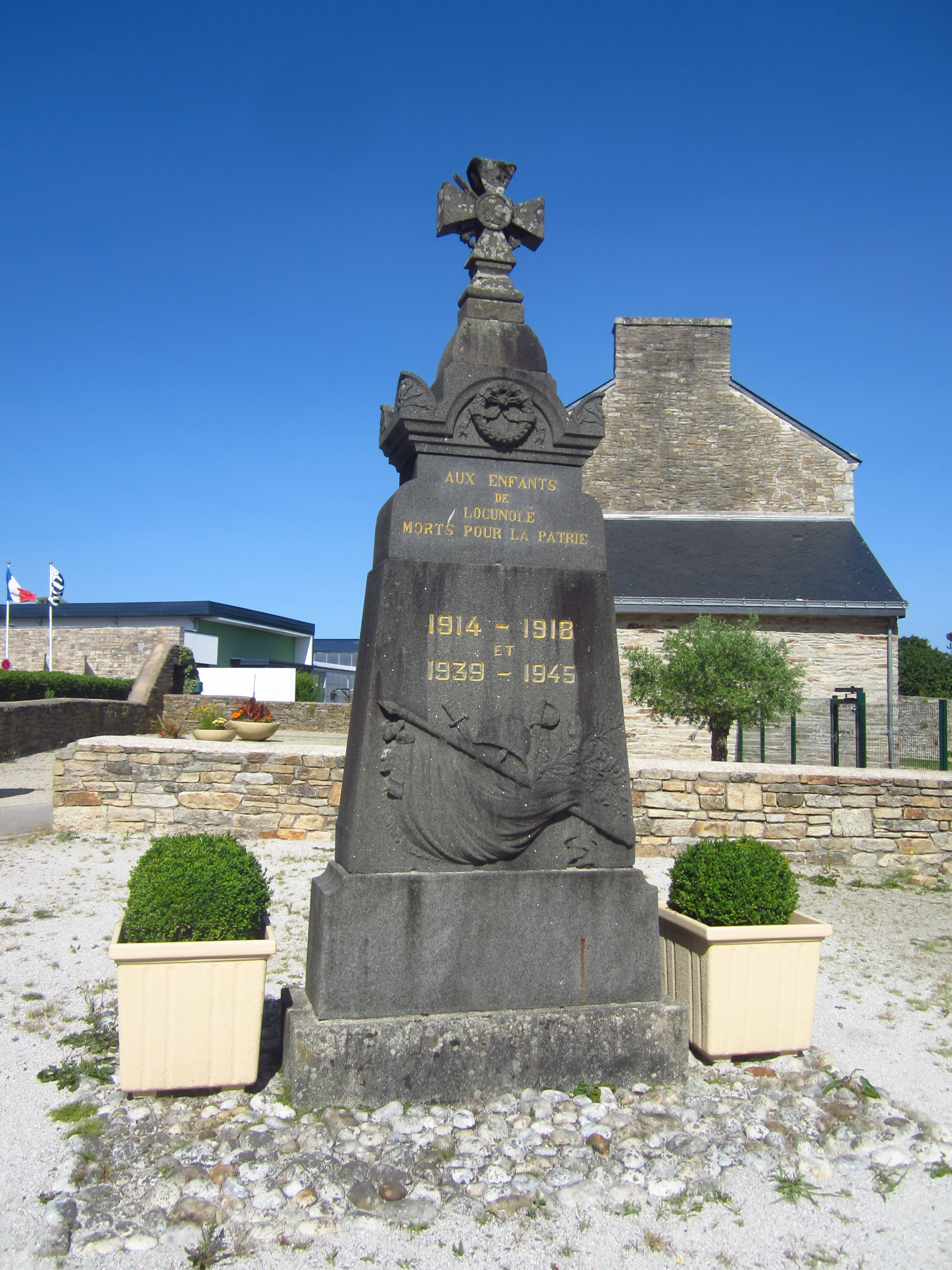
Locunolé war memorial

The Locunolé War Memorial is a simple kersantite relief depicting a flag, helmet and sword decorate the memorial which also bears the croix de guerre. The inscription is added in both French and Latin. Attributed to Joncourt but this is not completely certain.

=== Moëlan-sur-Mer War Memorial ===
The Moëlan-sur-Mer War Memorial stands in a commune that lost 264 men in the two world wars.
