= Saint-Philibert's chapel (Trégunc) =

Chapel located in Finistère, France

Chapelle Saint-Philibert
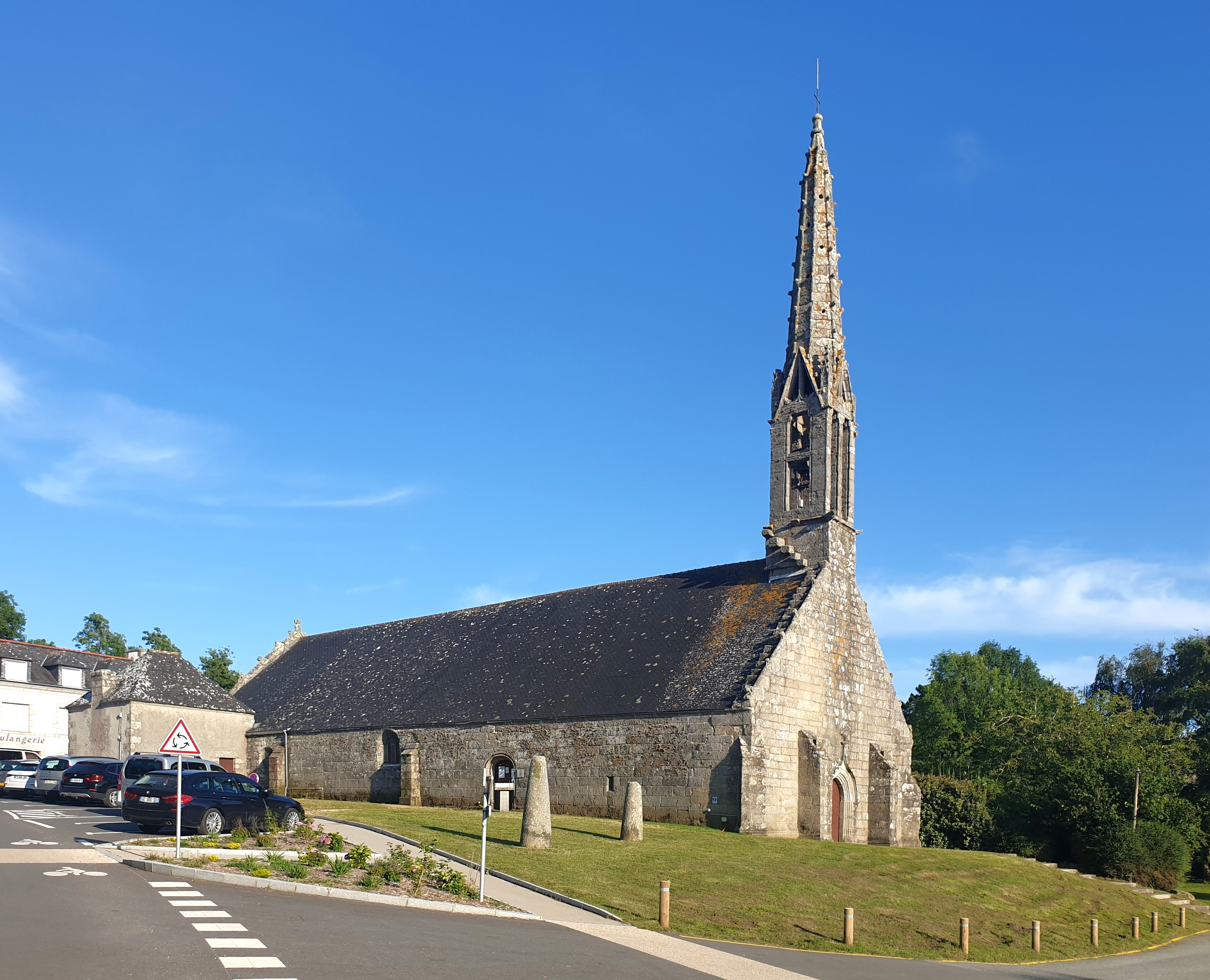

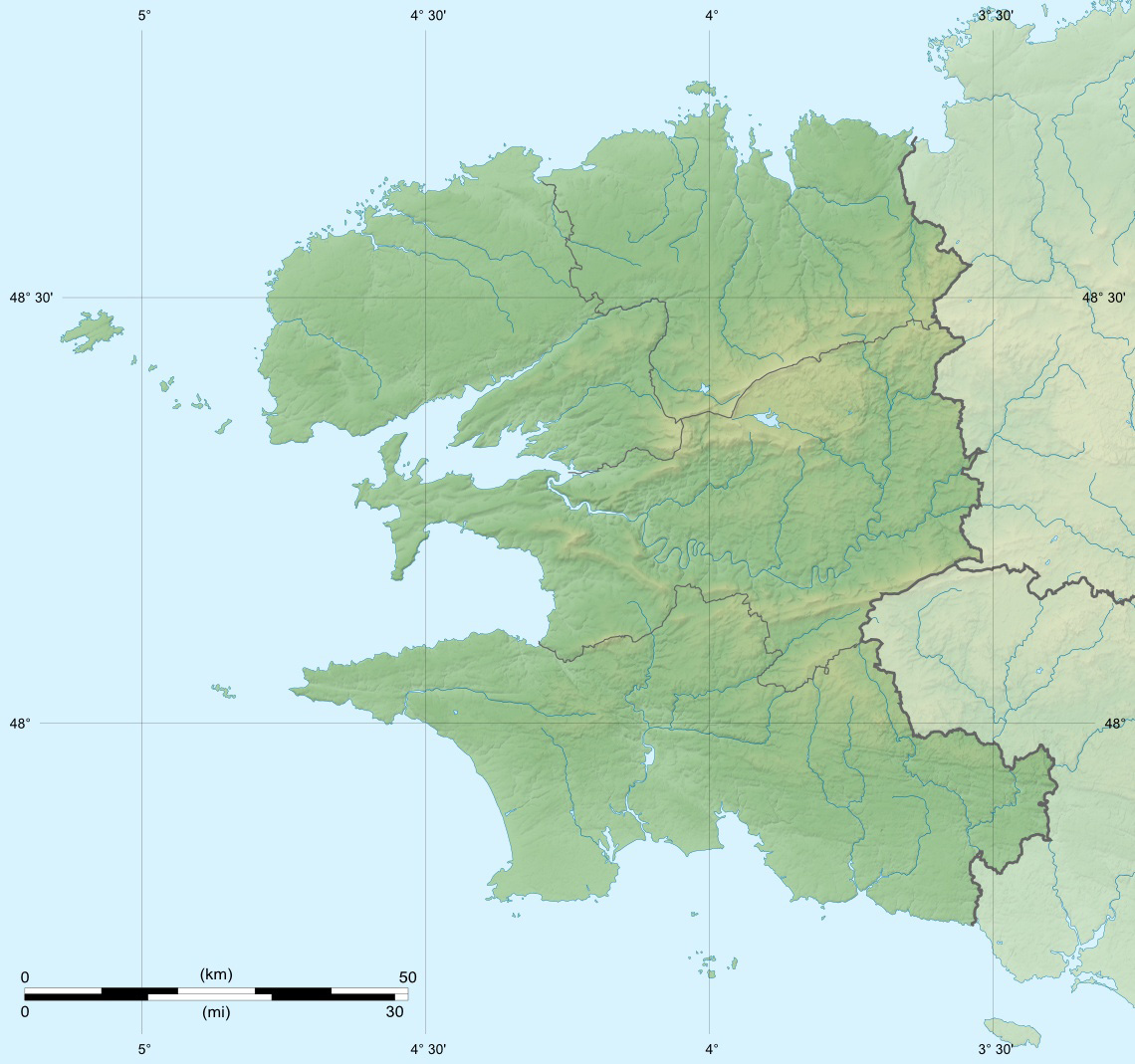
- Location within Finistère Location within France

Religion
- Affiliation: Roman Catholic

Location
- Location: Trégunc, Brittany, France
- Coordinates: 47°48′20″N 3°49′58″W

Architecture
- Style: Gothic architecture
- Completed: 1558-1575
- Direction of façade: West

The Saint-Philibert's chapel (French: Chapelle Saint-Philibert) is a former Roman Catholic chapel in Trégunc in Brittany.

== History ==
Saint-Philibert's chapel became a parish church in 1946. It is curiously built on a hillside, and the nave there is a drop of 1.23 meter. The various construction dates are known thanks to an inscription: "END THE YEAR 1558 A BA 1575 DONE".

== Gallery ==
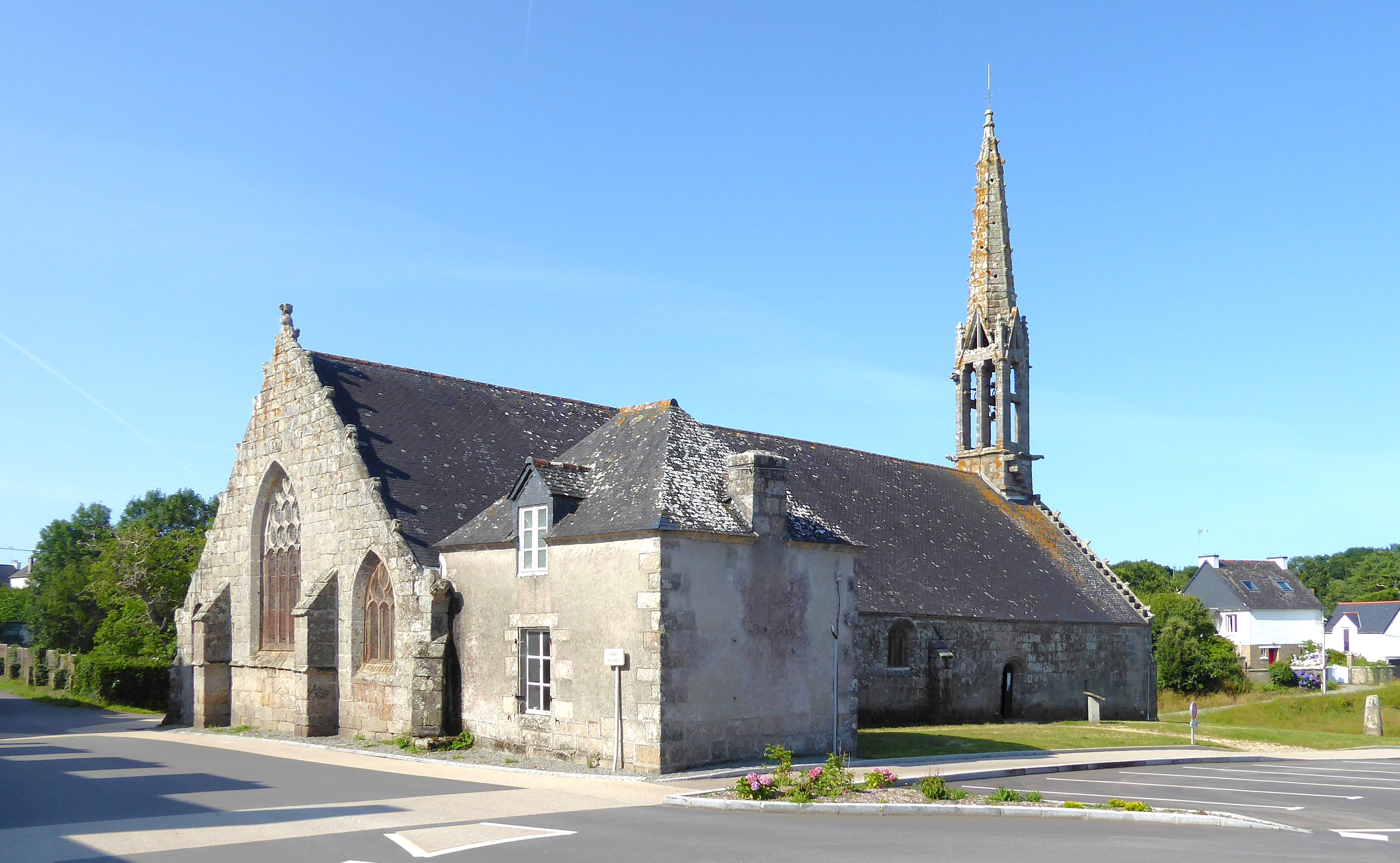

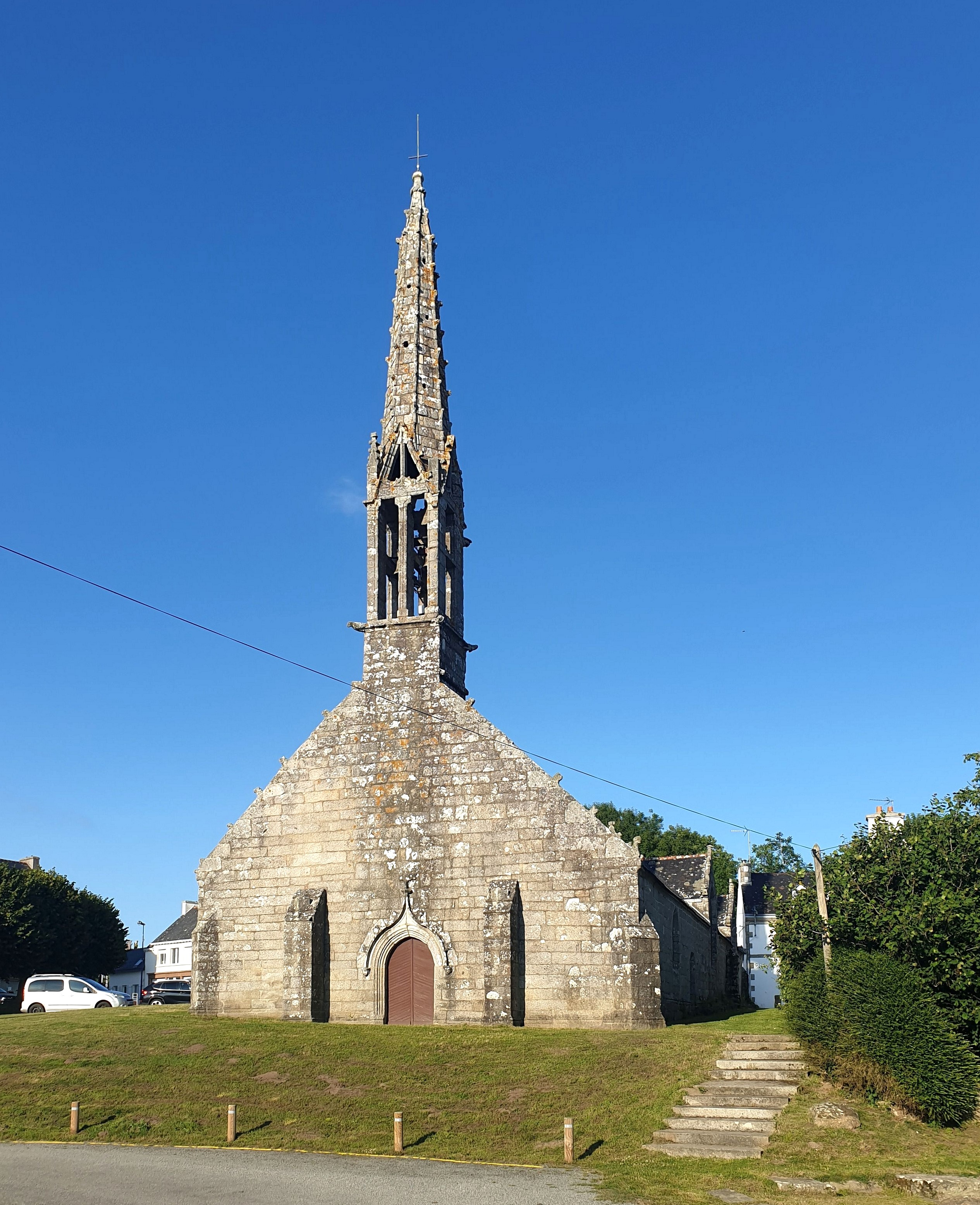

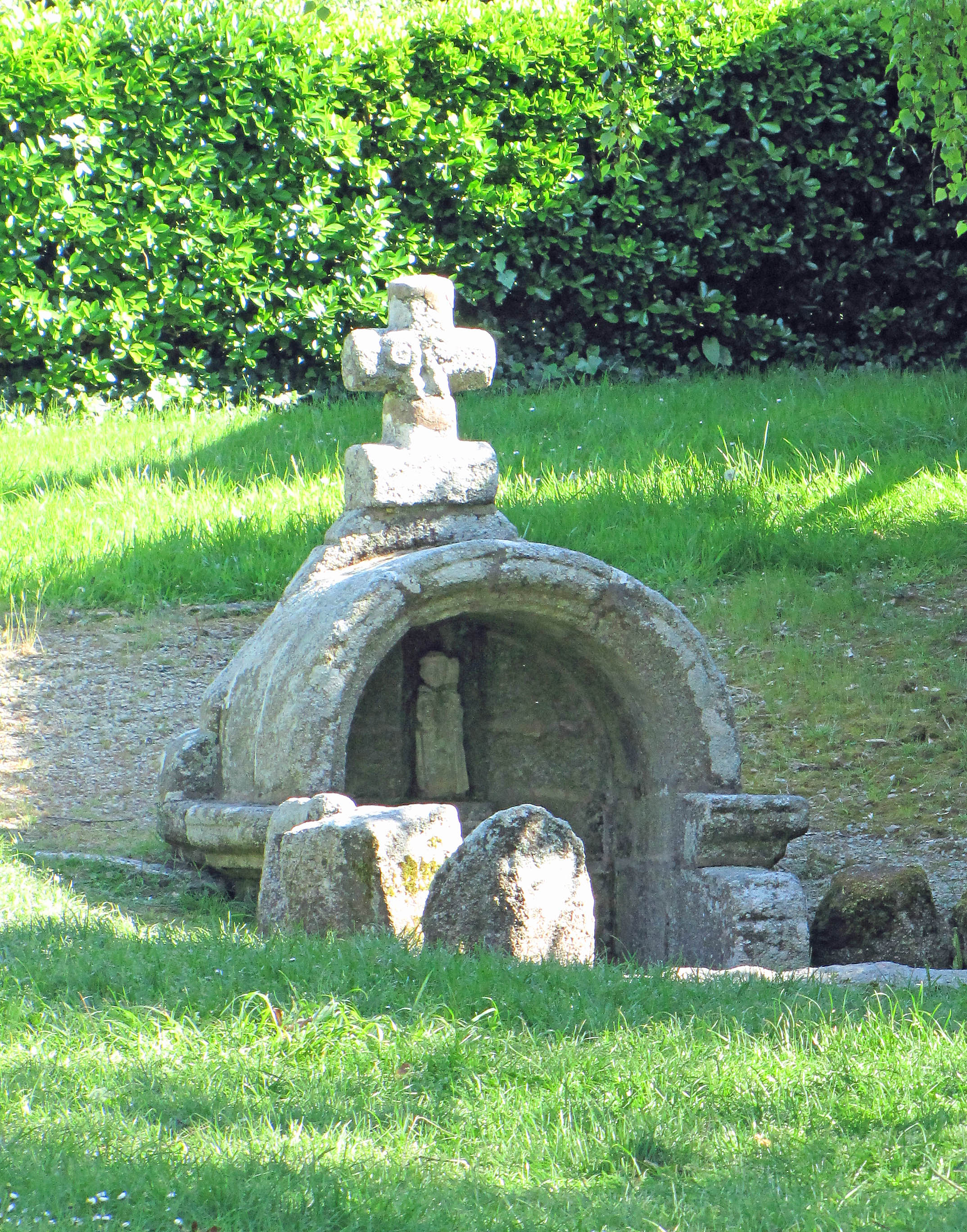

== Bibliography ==
- (in French) Collectif, Le patrimoine des communes du Finistère, éditions Flohic, 1998, 1565p. ISBN 978-2842340391
