= François Cadoret =

French politician

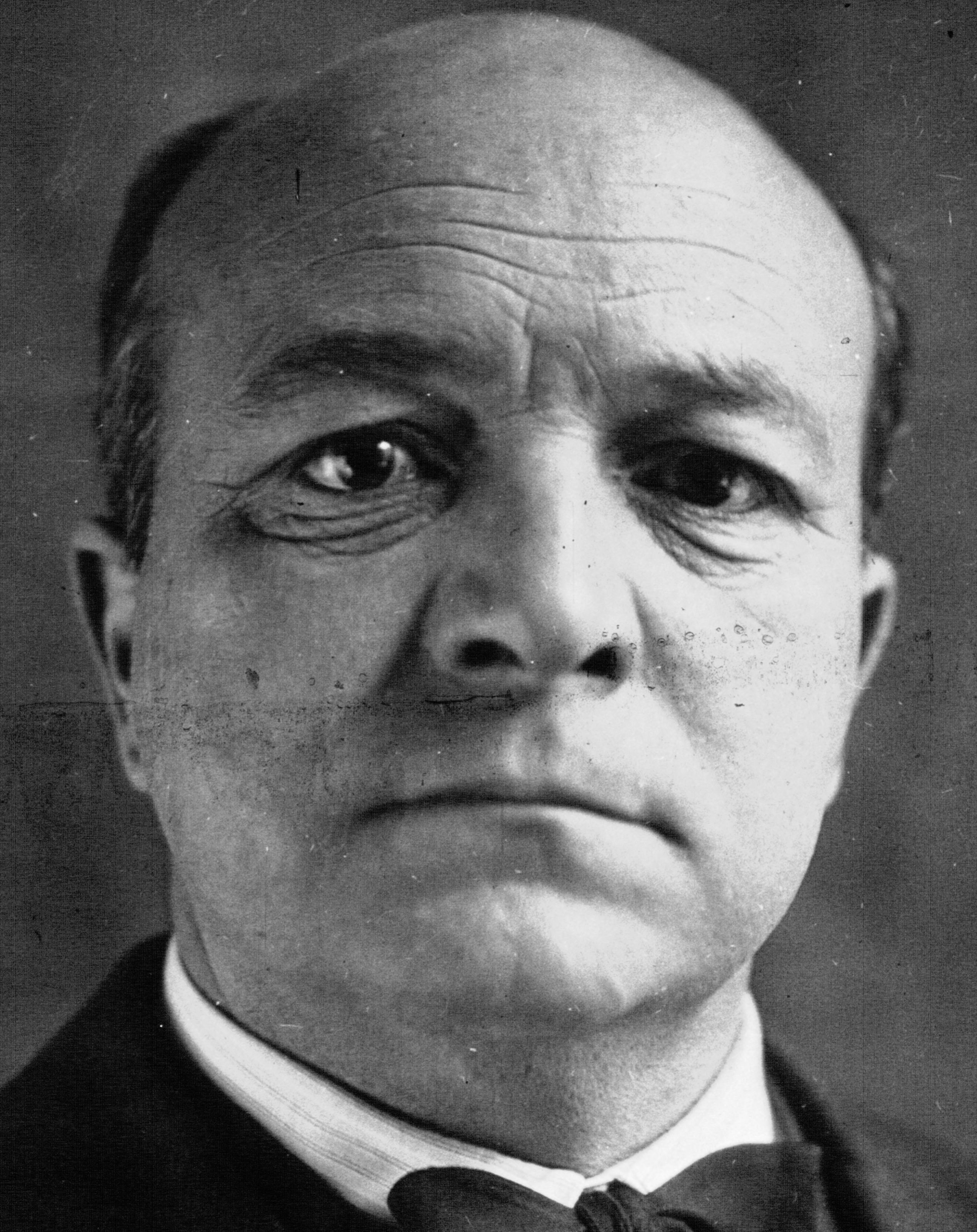
François Benjamin Pierre Joseph Cadoret

François Benjamin Pierre Joseph Cadoret (13 February 1887 – 24 June 1948) was a French politician.

Cadoret was born in Riec-sur-Belon on 13 February 1887. The family oyster farm and business, Les Huitres Cadoret, had been founded in 1880, and Cadoret began working there. He was elected to the municipal council in 1912, and became mayor in 1919, a post he retained until his death. Cadoret served as a general councillor in the canton of Pont-Aven between 1922 and 1945. He sat in the Chamber of Deputies from 1930 to 1936, and led the French Rugby League from 1934 to 1941. He later led fishery organizations. He received knighthood of the Legion of Honor, and died on 24 July 1948, aged 61.
