= Moëlan-sur-Mer =

Moëlan-sur-Mer Molan
- Commune
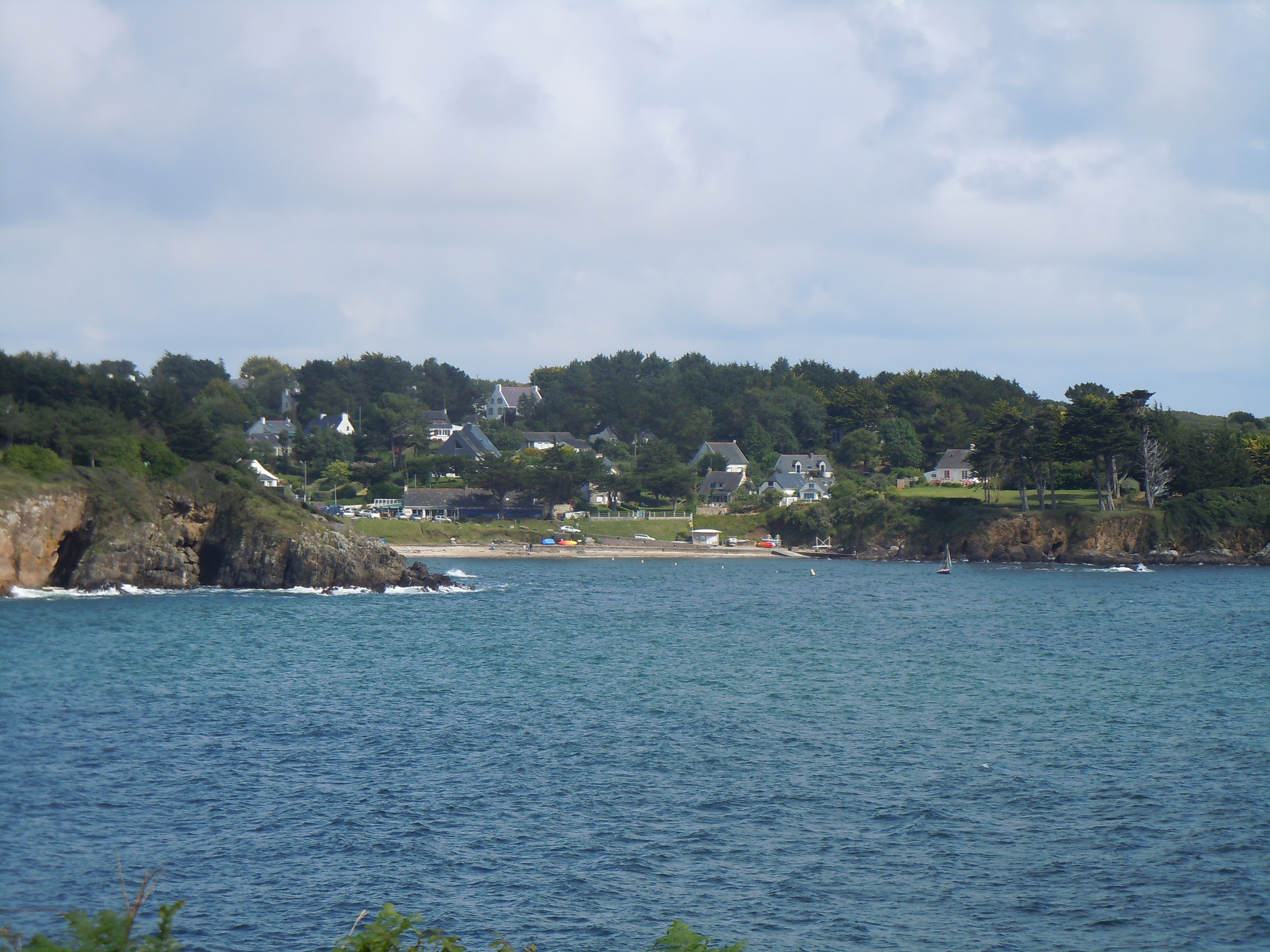
- The beach at Kerfany-les-Pins, in Moëlan-sur-Mer

- Coat of arms
- Location of Moëlan-sur-Mer
- Location within France Location within Brittany
- Coordinates: 47°48′54″N 3°37′37″W
- Country: France
- Region: Brittany
- Department: Finistère
- Arrondissement: Quimper
- Canton: Moëlan-sur-Mer
- Intercommunality: CA Quimperlé Communauté

Government
  - Mayor (2020–2026): Marie-Louise Grisel
- Area^{1}: 47.30 km^{2} (18.26 sq mi)
- Highest elevation: 67 m (220 ft)
- Lowest elevation: 0 m (0 ft)
- Population (2023): 6,749
  - Density: 142.7/km^{2} (369.6/sq mi)
- Time zone: UTC+01:00 (CET)
  - Summer (DST): UTC+02:00 (CEST)
- INSEE/Postal code: 29150 /29350
- ^{1} French Land Register data, which excludes lakes, ponds, glaciers > 1 km^{2} (0.386 sq mi or 247 acres) and river estuaries.

Moëlan-sur-Mer (French pronunciation: [mwɛlɑ̃ syʁ mɛʁ], literally Moëlan on Sea; Breton: Molan) is a commune in the Finistère department and administrative region of Brittany in north-western France.

== Population ==
In French the inhabitants of Moëlan-sur-Mer are known as Moëlanais.

Historical population

Year	Pop.	±% p.a.
1793	3,103	—
1800	3,258	+0.70%
1806	3,609	+1.72%
1821	3,656	+0.09%
1831	3,839	+0.49%
1836	4,201	+1.82%
1841	4,132	−0.33%
1846	4,325	+0.92%
1851	4,432	+0.49%
1856	4,370	−0.28%
1861	4,360	−0.05%
1866	4,595	+1.06%
1872	4,653	+0.21%
1876	4,963	+1.63%
1881	5,213	+0.99%
1886	5,410	+0.74%
1891	5,481	+0.26%
1896	5,726	+0.88%
1901	5,887	+0.56%

Year	Pop.	±% p.a.
1906	6,315	+1.41%
1911	6,640	+1.01%
1921	6,720	+0.12%
1926	6,659	−0.18%
1931	6,520	−0.42%
1936	6,543	+0.07%
1946	6,810	+0.40%
1954	6,517	−0.55%
1962	6,653	+0.26%
1968	6,276	−0.97%
1975	6,297	+0.05%
1982	6,501	+0.46%
1990	6,596	+0.18%
1999	6,592	−0.01%
2007	6,879	+0.53%
2012	7,002	+0.36%
2017	6,781	−0.64%
2023	6,749	−0.08%

Source: EHESS and INSEE (1968-2023)

== Map ==
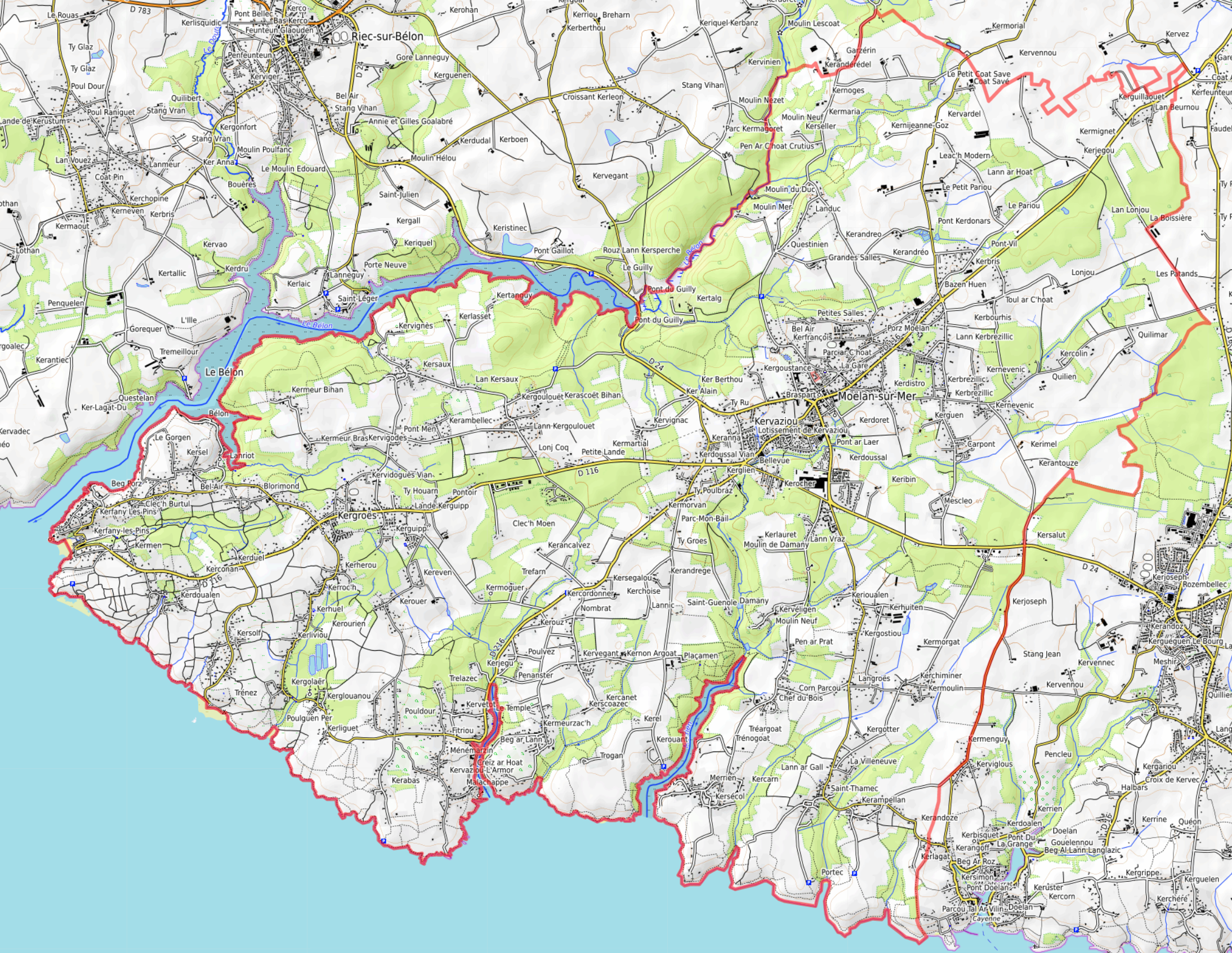
Topographic map

== See also ==
- Communes of the Finistère department
- Jean Joncourt, sculptor of the local war memorial
