= Canton of Moëlan-sur-Mer =

Coordinates: 47.81°N 3.63°W

The canton of Moëlan-sur-Mer is an administrative division of the Finistère department, northwestern France. It was created at the French canton reorganisation which came into effect in March 2015. Its seat is in Moëlan-sur-Mer.

It consists of the following communes:

1. Bannalec
2. Moëlan-sur-Mer
3. Névez
4. Pont-Aven
5. Riec-sur-Bélon
6. Scaër
7. Trégunc
8. Le Trévoux
