= Quéven =

Quéven Kewenn
- Commune
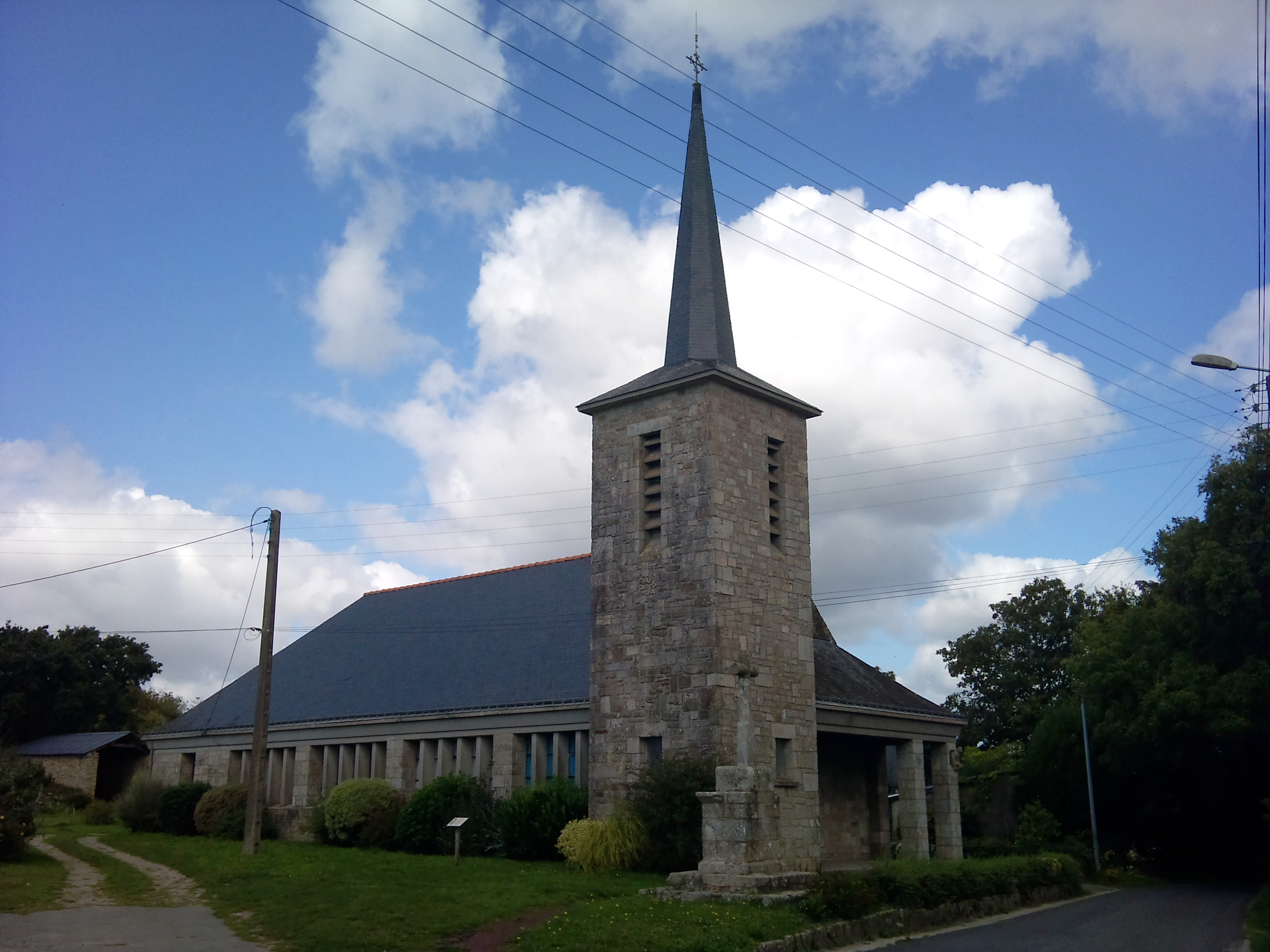
- Chapelle de la Trinité de Quéven
- Location of Quéven
- Location within France Location within Brittany
- Coordinates: 47°47′22″N 3°24′50″W
- Country: France
- Region: Brittany
- Department: Morbihan
- Arrondissement: Lorient
- Canton: Ploemeur
- Intercommunality: Lorient Agglomération

Government
  - Mayor (2026–32): Marc Boutruche
- Area^{1}: 23.93 km^{2} (9.24 sq mi)
- Highest elevation: 66 m (217 ft)
- Lowest elevation: 2 m (6.6 ft)
- Population (2023): 8,991
  - Density: 375.7/km^{2} (973.1/sq mi)
- Time zone: UTC+01:00 (CET)
  - Summer (DST): UTC+02:00 (CEST)
- INSEE/Postal code: 56185 /56530
- ^{1} French Land Register data, which excludes lakes, ponds, glaciers > 1 km^{2} (0.386 sq mi or 247 acres) and river estuaries.

Quéven (French pronunciation: [kevɛ̃]; Breton: Kewenn) is a commune in the Morbihan department of Brittany in north-western France.

== History ==
During World War I, Quéven lost one hundred and one of its children.

85% of the town was destroyed in World War II. In January 1945, the city of Toulouse adopted the ruined town, via its mayor Raymond Badiou. In memory of this help the main square of Quéven was renamed "Place de la ville de Toulouse" and a street in Toulouse was renamed "Rue de Quéven".

The city of Queven has been honoured 25 September 1949 with Cross of War 1929-1945 by the citation 11 November 1948 of the Ministry of the Armed Force, Max Lejeune.

== Population ==
Inhabitants of Quéven are called in French Quévenois.

Historical population
Year	Pop.	±% p.a.
1968	2,954	—
1975	4,529	+6.30%
1982	6,798	+5.97%
1990	8,400	+2.68%
1999	8,314	−0.11%
2007	8,744	+0.63%
2012	8,666	−0.18%
2017	8,676	+0.02%
2023	8,991	+0.60%
Source: INSEE

== Twin towns ==
Quéven is twinned with:

- Dunmanway (Ireland)
- Koro (Mali)
- Altenkunstadt
- Weismain in Bavaria (Germany)

== Breton language ==
The municipality launched a linguistic plan through Ya d'ar brezhoneg on 26 September 2008.

In 2008, there was 1,83% of the children attended the bilingual schools in primary education.

== See also ==
- Communes of the Morbihan department
- Entry on sculptor of Quéven war memorial Jean Joncourt
