= Riec-sur-Bélon =

Riec-sur-Bélon Rieg
- Commune
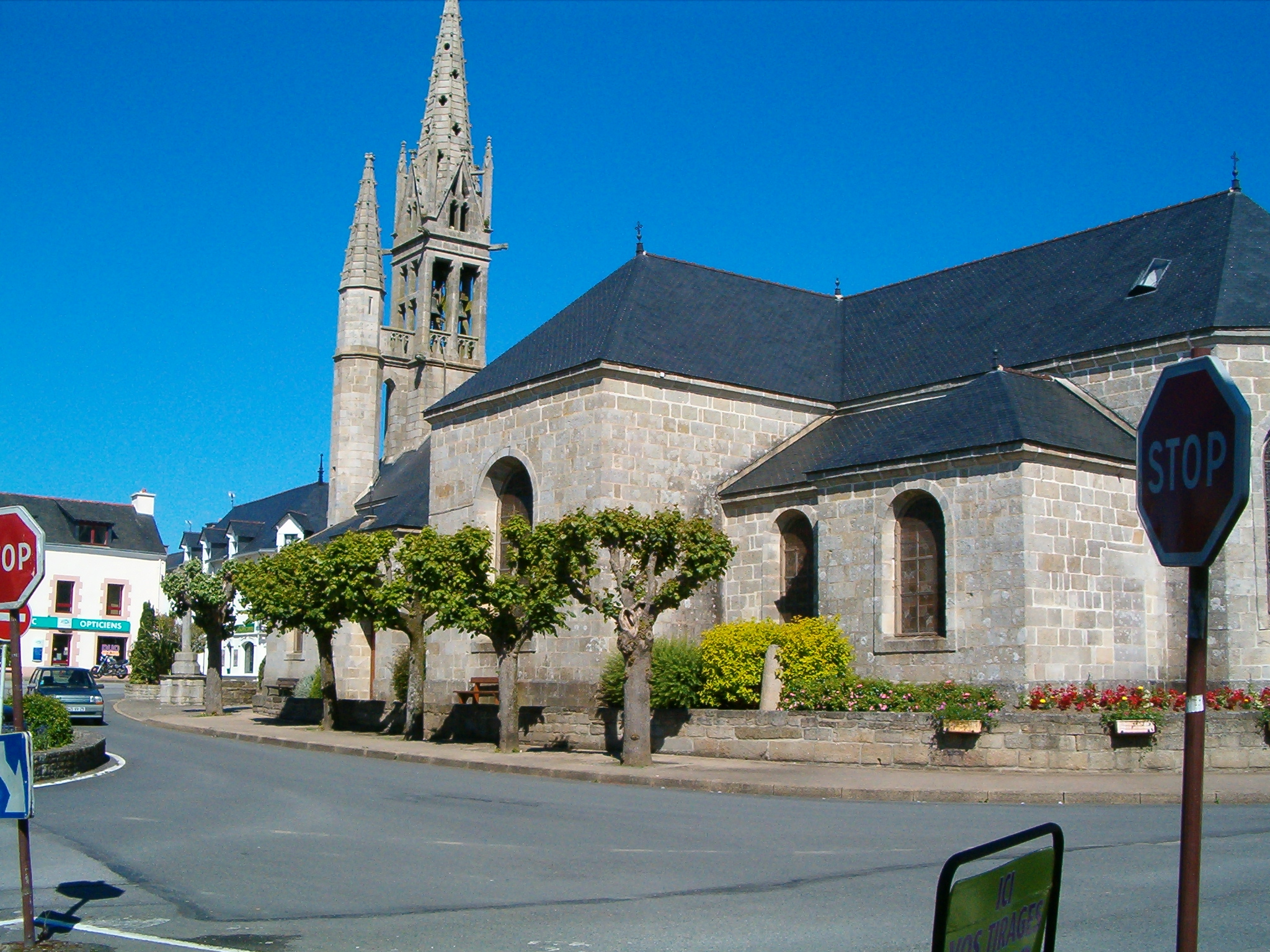
- The church of Saint-Pierre, in Riec-sur-Bélon

- Coat of arms
- Location of Riec-sur-Bélon
- Location within France Location within Brittany
- Coordinates: 47°50′41″N 3°41′36″W
- Country: France
- Region: Brittany
- Department: Finistère
- Arrondissement: Quimper
- Canton: Moëlan-sur-Mer
- Intercommunality: CA Quimperlé Communauté

Government
  - Mayor (2020–2026): Sébastien Miossec
- Area^{1}: 54.64 km^{2} (21.10 sq mi)
- Highest elevation: 94 m (308 ft)
- Lowest elevation: 0 m (0 ft)
- Population (2023): 4,376
  - Density: 80.09/km^{2} (207.4/sq mi)
- Time zone: UTC+01:00 (CET)
  - Summer (DST): UTC+02:00 (CEST)
- INSEE/Postal code: 29236 /29340
- ^{1} French Land Register data, which excludes lakes, ponds, glaciers > 1 km^{2} (0.386 sq mi or 247 acres) and river estuaries.

Riec-sur-Bélon (French pronunciation: [ʁjɛk syʁ belɔ̃]; Breton: Rieg) is a commune in the Finistère department of Brittany in north-western France.

== Population ==
Inhabitants of Riec-sur-Bélon are called in French Riécois.

Historical population

Year	Pop.	±% p.a.
1793	2,510	—
1800	2,625	+0.64%
1806	2,305	−2.14%
1821	2,591	+0.78%
1831	2,750	+0.60%
1836	2,855	+0.75%
1841	2,734	−0.86%
1846	3,110	+2.61%
1851	3,108	−0.01%
1856	3,109	+0.01%
1861	3,178	+0.44%
1866	3,155	−0.15%
1872	3,135	−0.11%
1876	3,403	+2.07%
1881	3,780	+2.12%
1886	3,901	+0.63%
1891	4,205	+1.51%
1896	4,418	+0.99%
1901	4,619	+0.89%

Year	Pop.	±% p.a.
1906	4,824	+0.87%
1911	4,939	+0.47%
1921	4,520	−0.88%
1926	4,532	+0.05%
1931	4,458	−0.33%
1936	4,301	−0.71%
1946	4,418	+0.27%
1954	4,206	−0.61%
1962	4,389	+0.53%
1968	4,308	−0.31%
1975	4,158	−0.51%
1982	4,059	−0.34%
1990	4,014	−0.14%
1999	4,008	−0.02%
2007	4,139	+0.40%
2012	4,108	−0.15%
2017	4,185	+0.37%
2023	4,376	+0.75%

Source: EHESS and INSEE (1968-2023)

== Breton language ==
The municipality launched a linguistic plan concerning the Breton language through Ya d'ar brezhoneg on 16 December 2008.

== International relations ==
Riec-sur-Bélon is twinned with:

- (England) Ilminster, Somerset, United Kingdom

== Notable people ==
- François Cadoret (1887-1948) - politician

== See also ==
- Communes of the Finistère department
