= Le Trévoux =

Le Trévoux An Treou-Kernev
- Commune
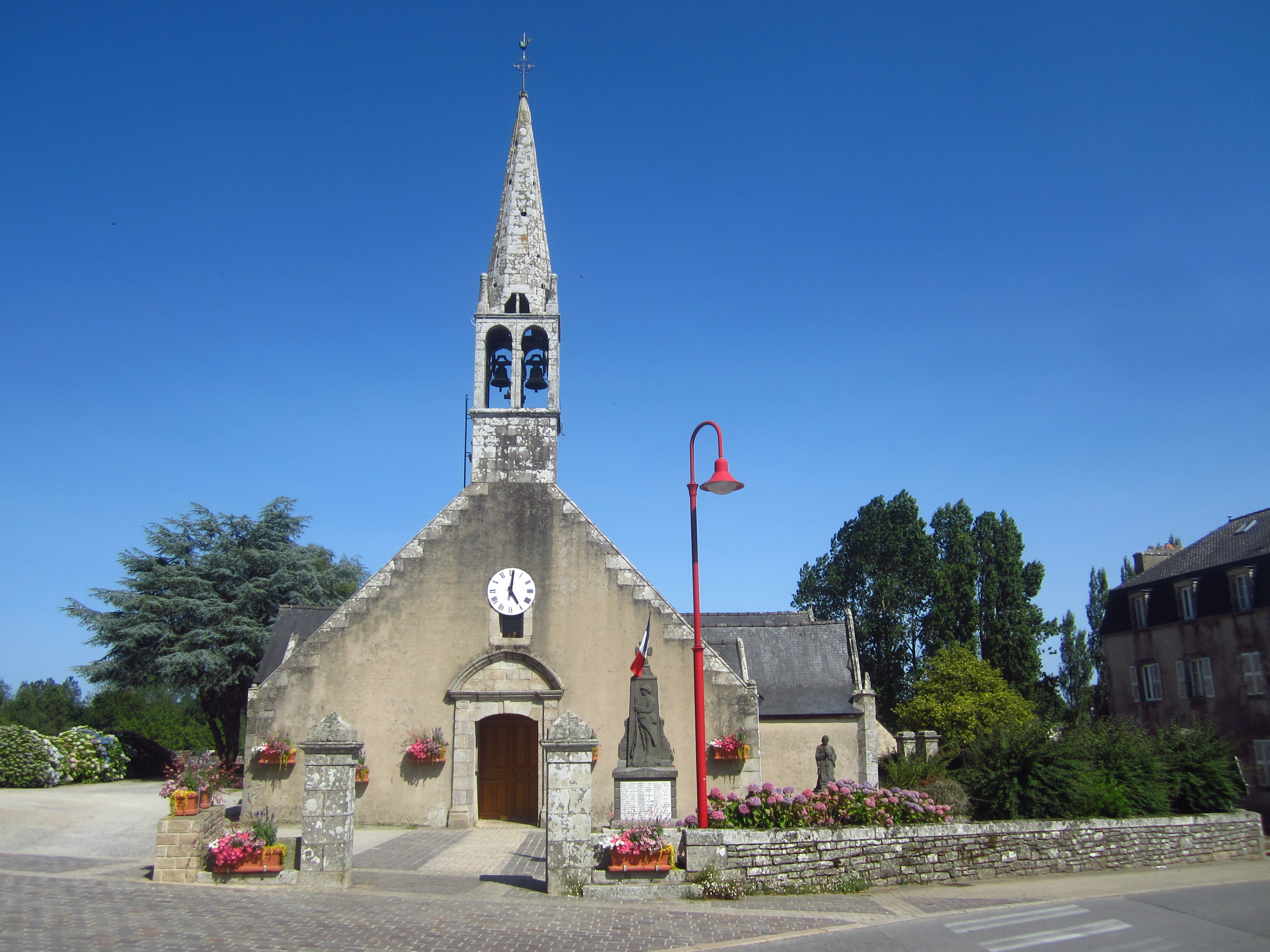
- The church of Saint-Pierre and Saint-Paul, in Le Trévoux

- Coat of arms
- Location of Le Trévoux
- Location within France Location within Brittany
- Coordinates: 47°53′43″N 3°38′24″W
- Country: France
- Region: Brittany
- Department: Finistère
- Arrondissement: Quimper
- Canton: Moëlan-sur-Mer
- Intercommunality: CA Quimperlé Communauté

Government
  - Mayor (2020–2026): Élina Vandenbroucke
- Area^{1}: 20.83 km^{2} (8.04 sq mi)
- Highest elevation: 105 m (344 ft)
- Lowest elevation: 47 m (154 ft)
- Population (2023): 1,652
  - Density: 79.31/km^{2} (205.4/sq mi)
- Time zone: UTC+01:00 (CET)
  - Summer (DST): UTC+02:00 (CEST)
- INSEE/Postal code: 29300 /29380
- ^{1} French Land Register data, which excludes lakes, ponds, glaciers > 1 km^{2} (0.386 sq mi or 247 acres) and river estuaries.

Le Trévoux (French pronunciation: [lə tʁevu]; Breton: An Treoù-Kerne) is a commune in the Finistère department of Brittany in north-western France.

== Population ==
Inhabitants of Le Trévoux are called in French Trévoltois.

Historical population

Year	Pop.	±% p.a.
1800	720	—
1806	887	+3.54%
1821	1,130	+1.63%
1831	1,122	−0.07%
1836	1,196	+1.29%
1841	1,146	−0.85%
1846	1,211	+1.11%
1851	1,230	+0.31%
1856	1,322	+1.45%
1861	1,247	−1.16%
1866	1,295	+0.76%
1872	1,173	−1.64%
1876	1,313	+2.86%
1881	1,341	+0.42%
1886	1,418	+1.12%
1891	1,507	+1.22%
1896	1,547	+0.53%
1901	1,592	+0.58%

Year	Pop.	±% p.a.
1906	1,640	+0.60%
1911	1,645	+0.06%
1921	1,561	−0.52%
1926	1,480	−1.06%
1931	1,506	+0.35%
1936	1,507	+0.01%
1946	1,501	−0.04%
1954	1,334	−1.46%
1962	1,106	−2.32%
1968	1,023	−1.29%
1975	879	−2.14%
1982	925	+0.73%
1990	983	+0.76%
1999	1,138	+1.64%
2007	1,409	+2.71%
2012	1,527	+1.62%
2017	1,606	+1.01%
2023	1,652	+0.47%

Source: EHESS and INSEE (1968-2023)

== Map ==
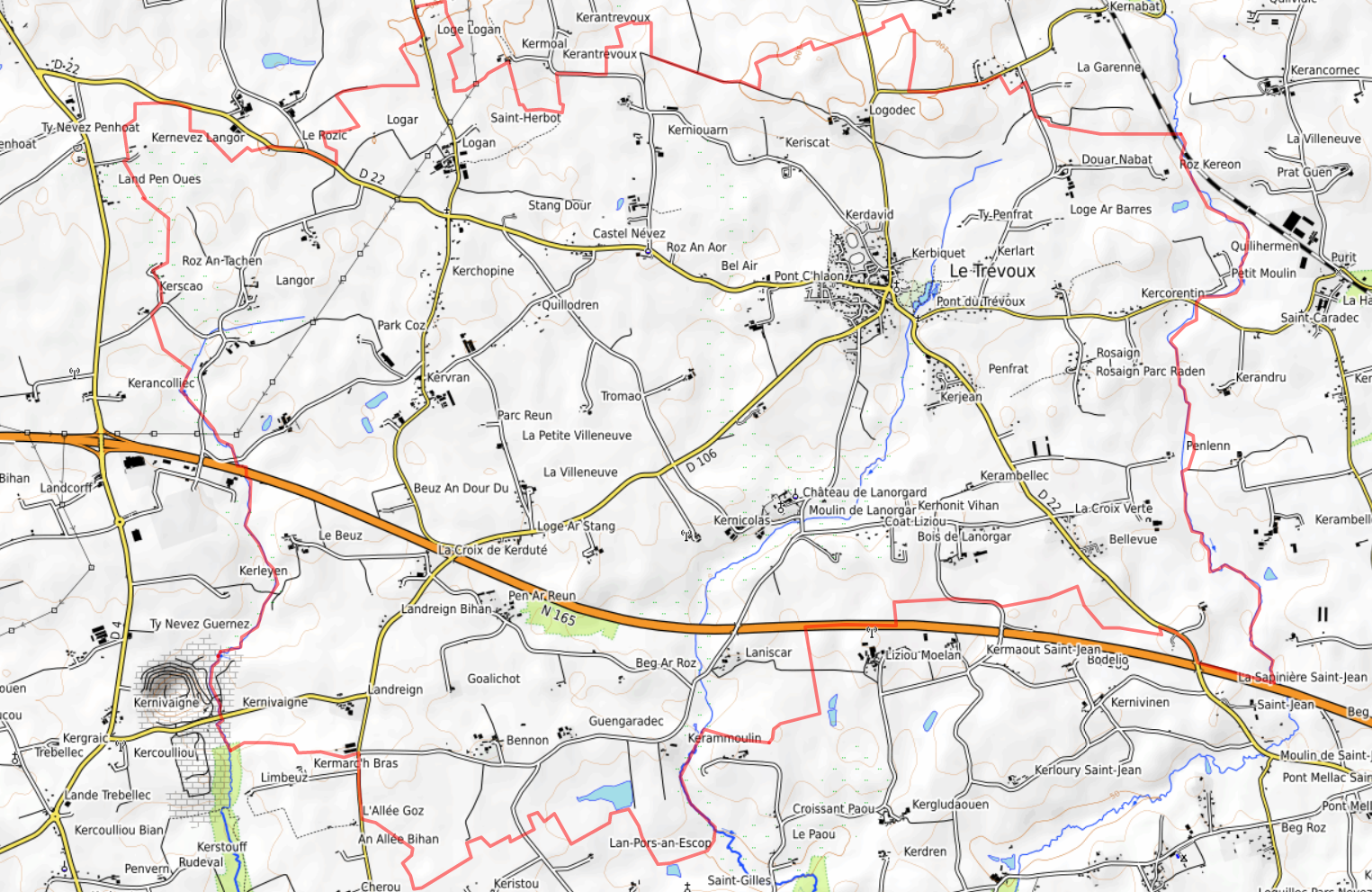
Topographic map

== See also ==
- Communes of the Finistère department
