= Trégunc =

Trégunc Tregon
- Commune
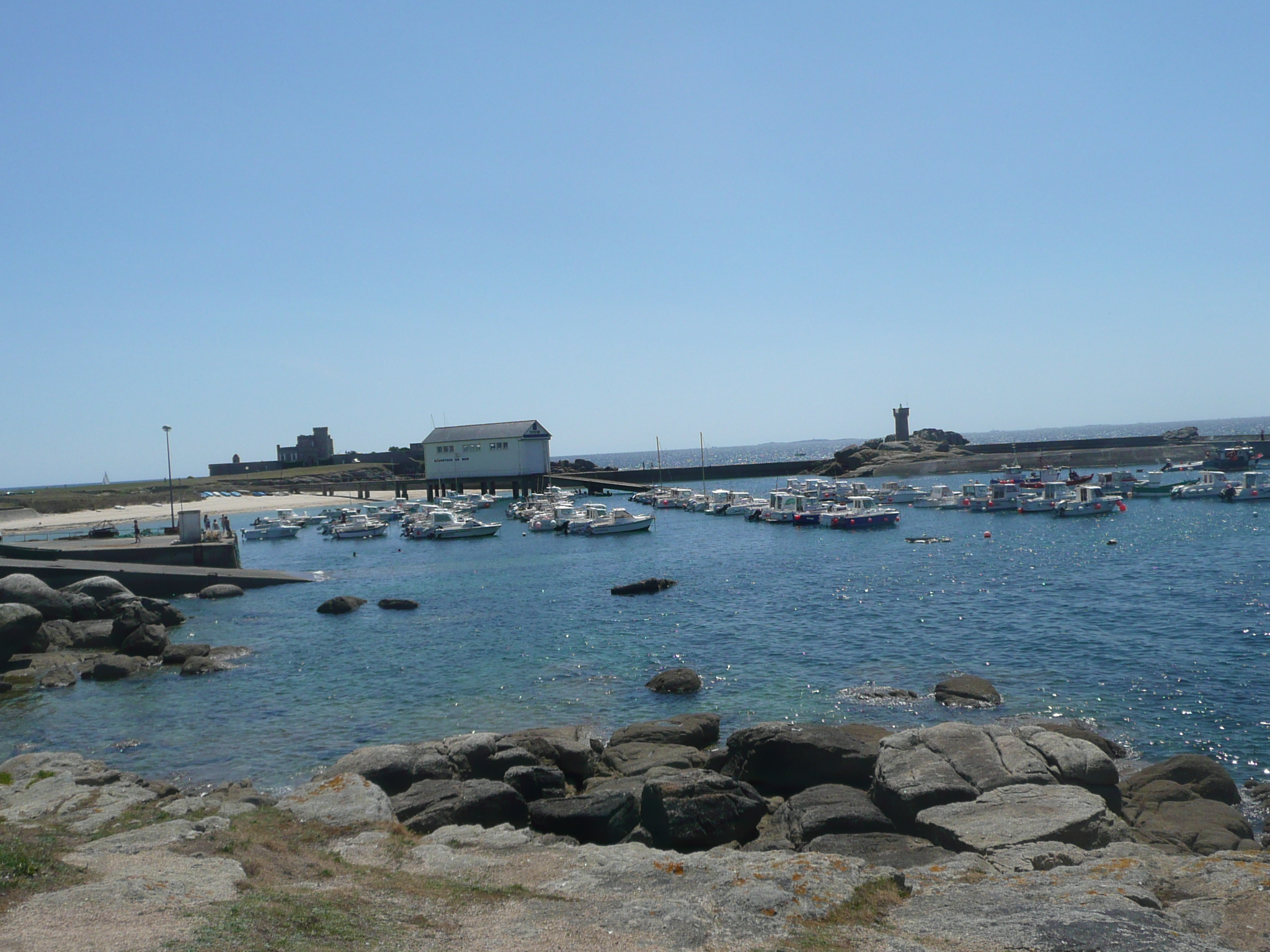
- The harbour of Trévignon
- Location of Trégunc
- Location within France Location within Brittany
- Coordinates: 47°51′23″N 3°51′02″W
- Country: France
- Region: Brittany
- Department: Finistère
- Arrondissement: Quimper
- Canton: Moëlan-sur-Mer
- Intercommunality: Concarneau Cornouaille Agglomération

Government
  - Mayor (2020–2026): Olivier Bellec
- Area^{1}: 50.61 km^{2} (19.54 sq mi)
- Highest elevation: 89 m (292 ft)
- Lowest elevation: 0 m (0 ft)
- Population (2023): 7,148
  - Density: 141.2/km^{2} (365.8/sq mi)
- Time zone: UTC+01:00 (CET)
  - Summer (DST): UTC+02:00 (CEST)
- INSEE/Postal code: 29293 /29910
- ^{1} French Land Register data, which excludes lakes, ponds, glaciers > 1 km^{2} (0.386 sq mi or 247 acres) and river estuaries.

Trégunc (French pronunciation: [tʁeɡœ̃]; Breton: Tregon) is a commune in the Finistère department of Brittany, western France.

== Population ==
Inhabitants of Trégunc are called in French Trégunois or Tréguncois.

Historical population

Year	Pop.	±% p.a.
1793	2,146	—
1800	2,522	+2.33%
1806	2,531	+0.06%
1821	2,782	+0.63%
1831	3,029	+0.85%
1836	3,086	+0.37%
1841	3,204	+0.75%
1846	3,462	+1.56%
1851	3,481	+0.11%
1856	3,540	+0.34%
1861	3,484	−0.32%
1866	3,528	+0.25%
1872	3,600	+0.34%
1876	3,697	+0.67%
1881	3,809	+0.60%
1886	3,860	+0.27%
1891	4,165	+1.53%
1896	4,470	+1.42%
1901	4,703	+1.02%

Year	Pop.	±% p.a.
1906	4,848	+0.61%
1911	4,991	+0.58%
1921	4,763	−0.47%
1926	4,878	+0.48%
1931	4,675	−0.85%
1936	4,802	+0.54%
1946	4,889	+0.18%
1954	4,795	−0.24%
1962	5,002	+0.53%
1968	4,790	−0.72%
1975	5,155	+1.05%
1982	5,909	+1.97%
1990	6,130	+0.46%
1999	6,354	+0.40%
2007	6,751	+0.76%
2012	6,980	+0.67%
2017	7,041	+0.17%
2023	7,148	+0.25%

Source: EHESS and INSEE (1968-2023)

== Cultural heritage ==
- Saint-Philibert's chapel (Trégunc): 16th-century chapel.
- Château de Kerminaouet

== Breton language ==
In 2008, 7.19% of primary-school children attended bilingual schools.

== Notable people ==
- Jeanne Boutbien, French-Senegalese swimmer, 2020 Summer Olympian

== Gallery ==
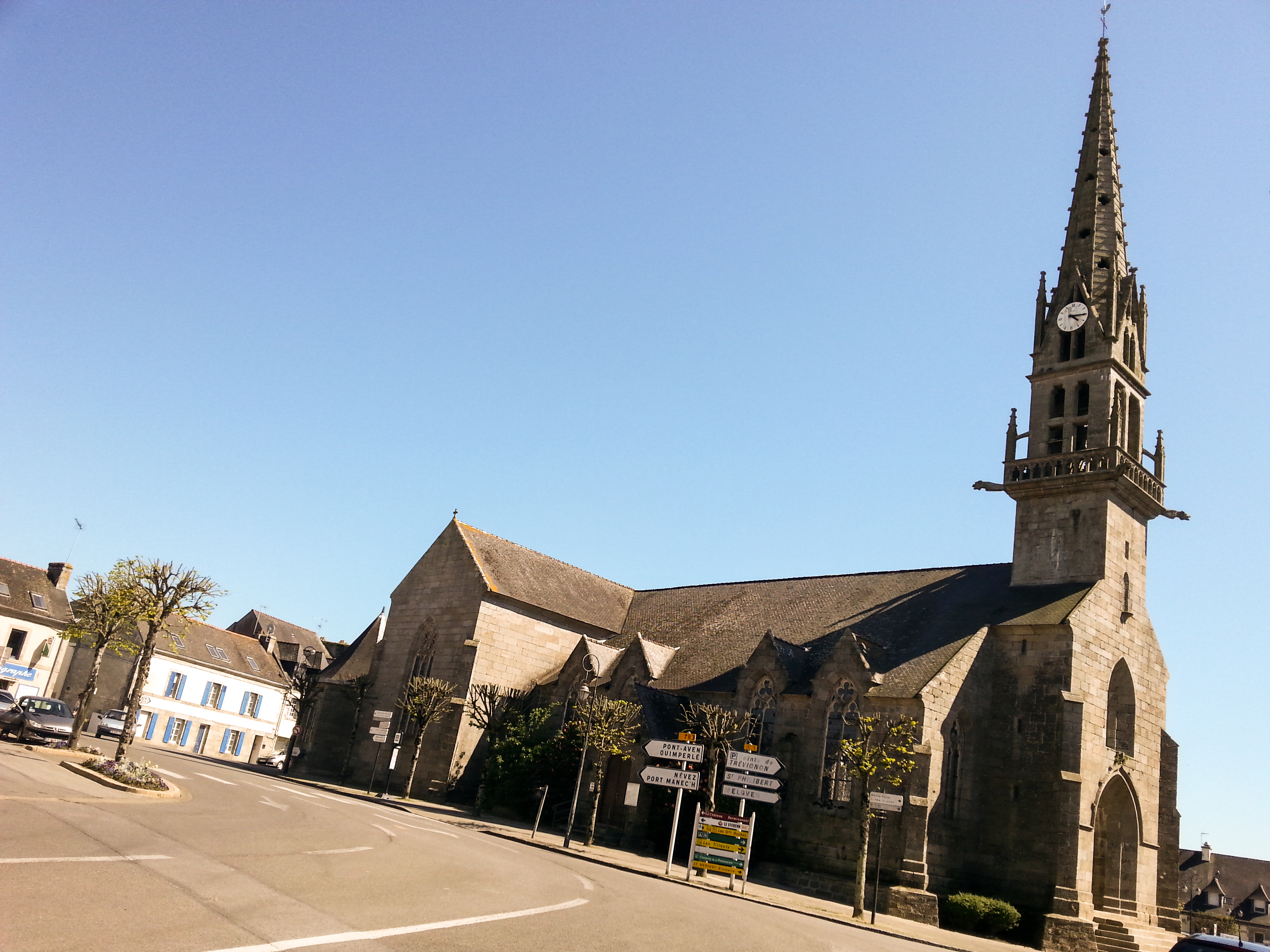

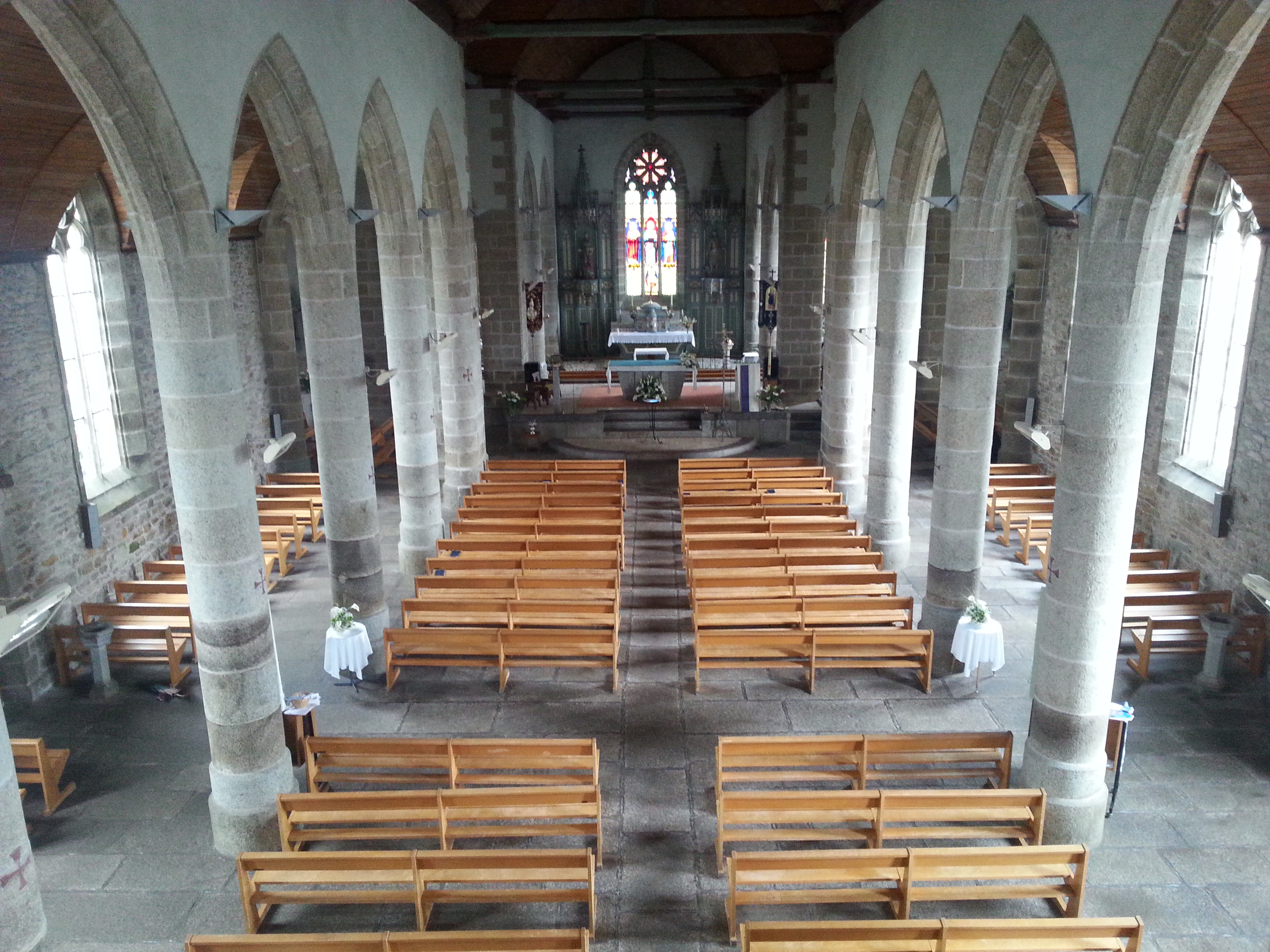

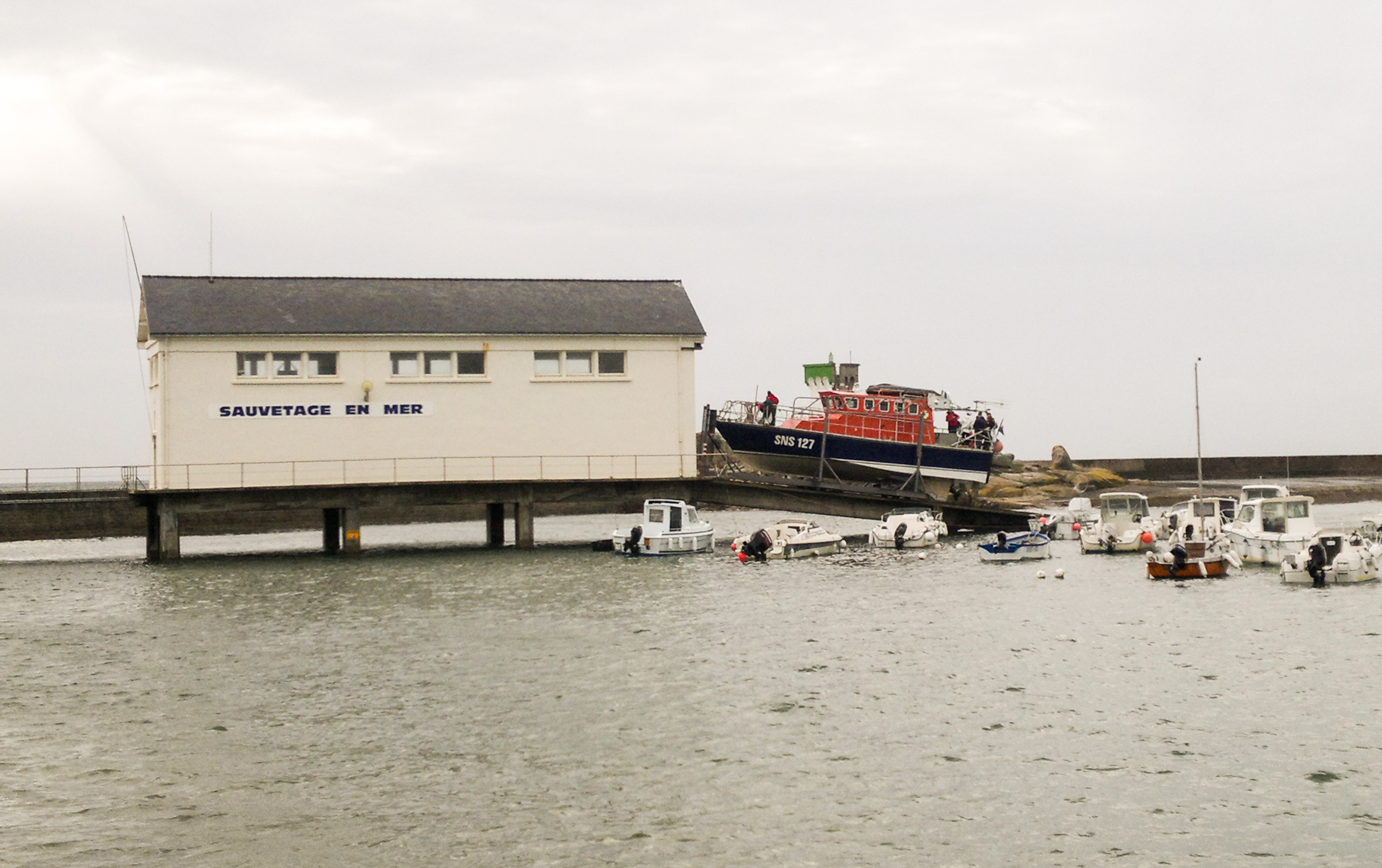

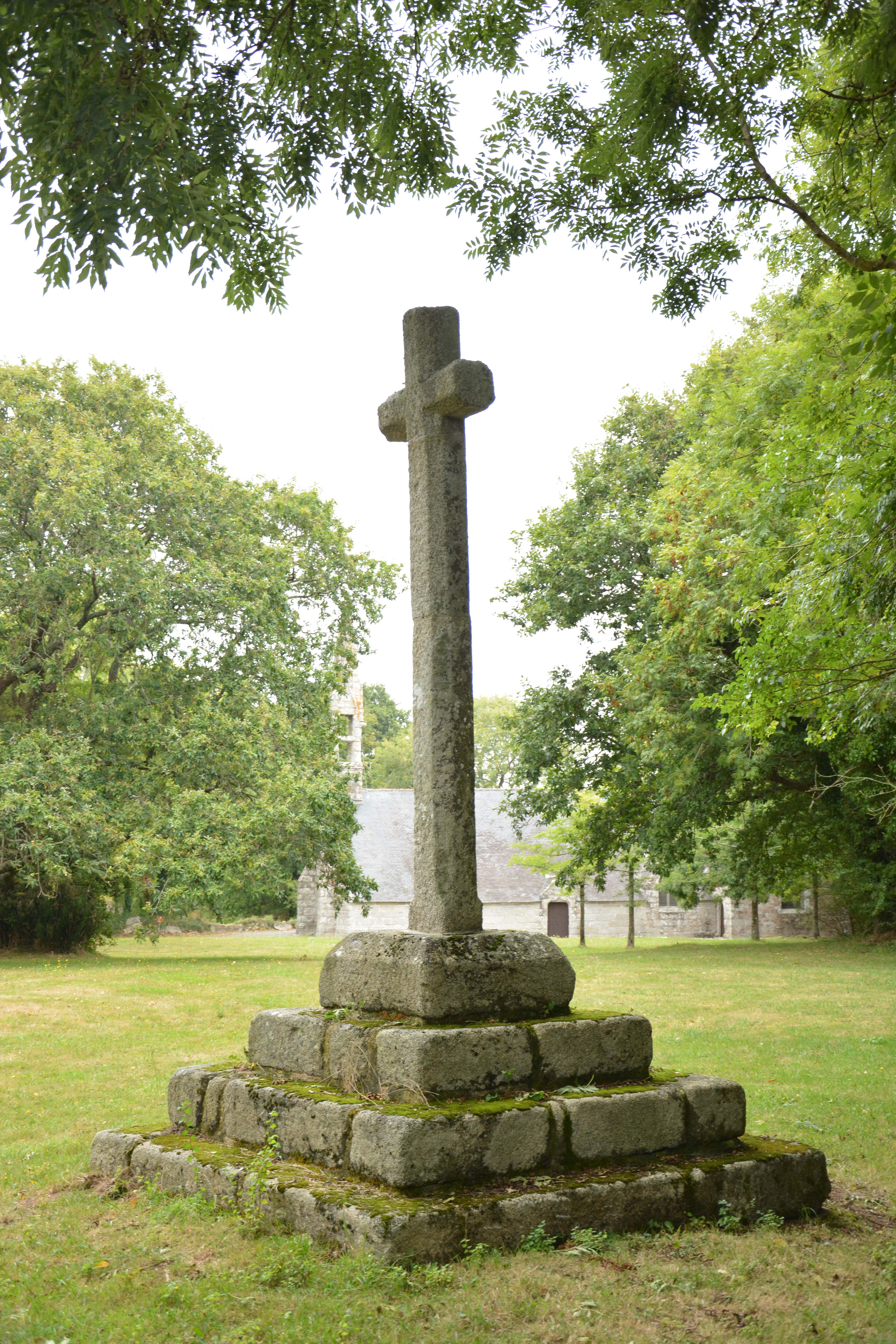

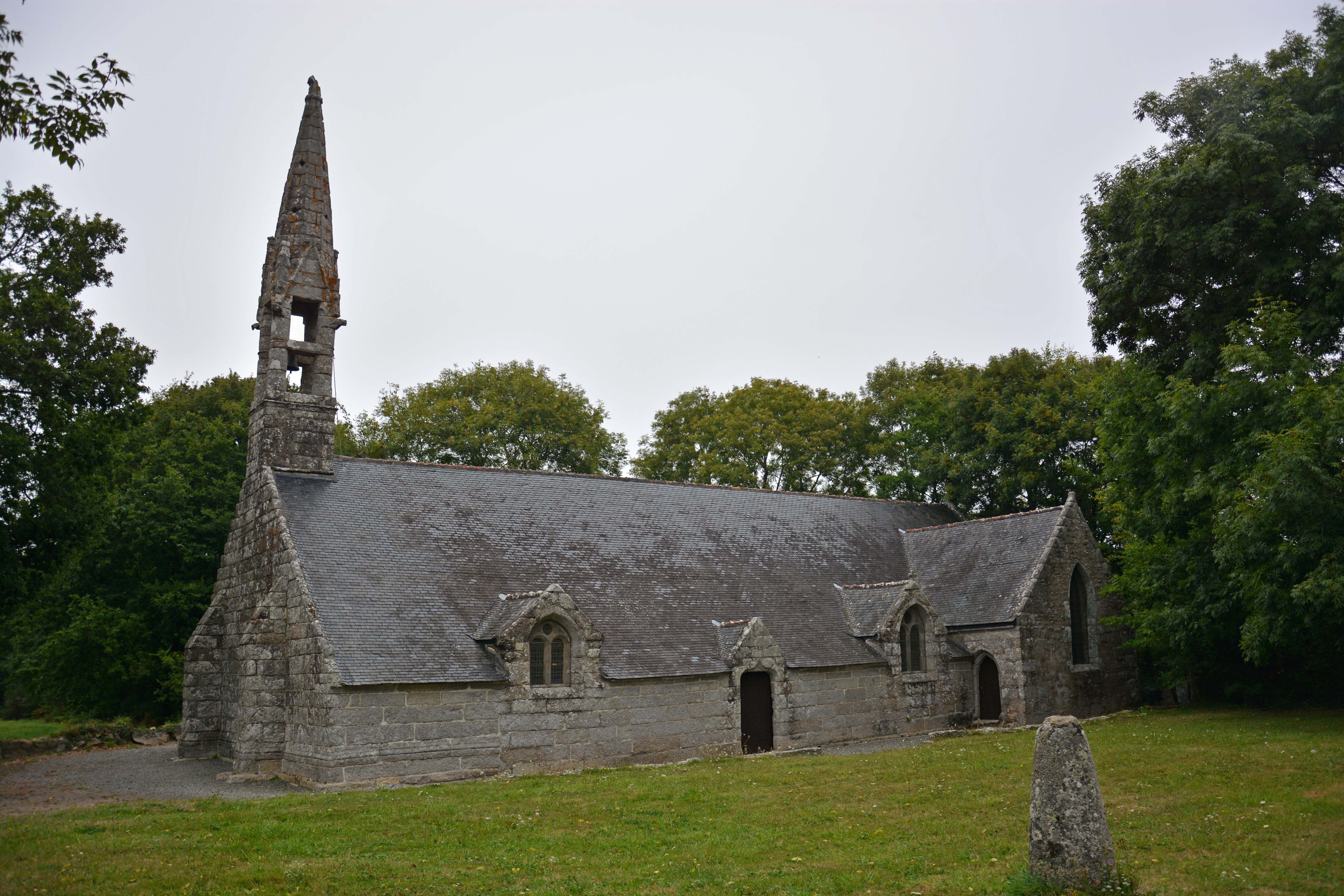

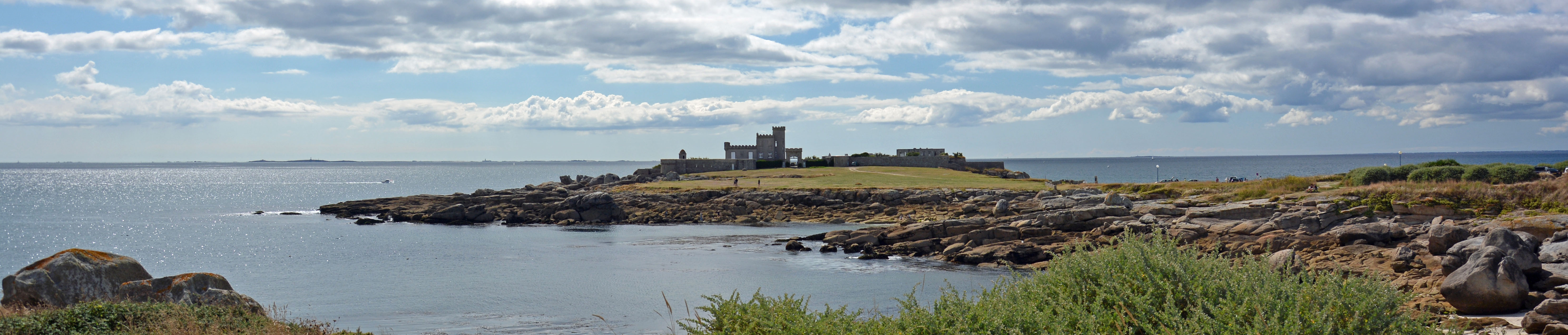

== See also ==
- Communes of the Finistère department
