= Sainte-Croix de Quimperlé Abbey =

Benedictine abbey in Quimperlé, France

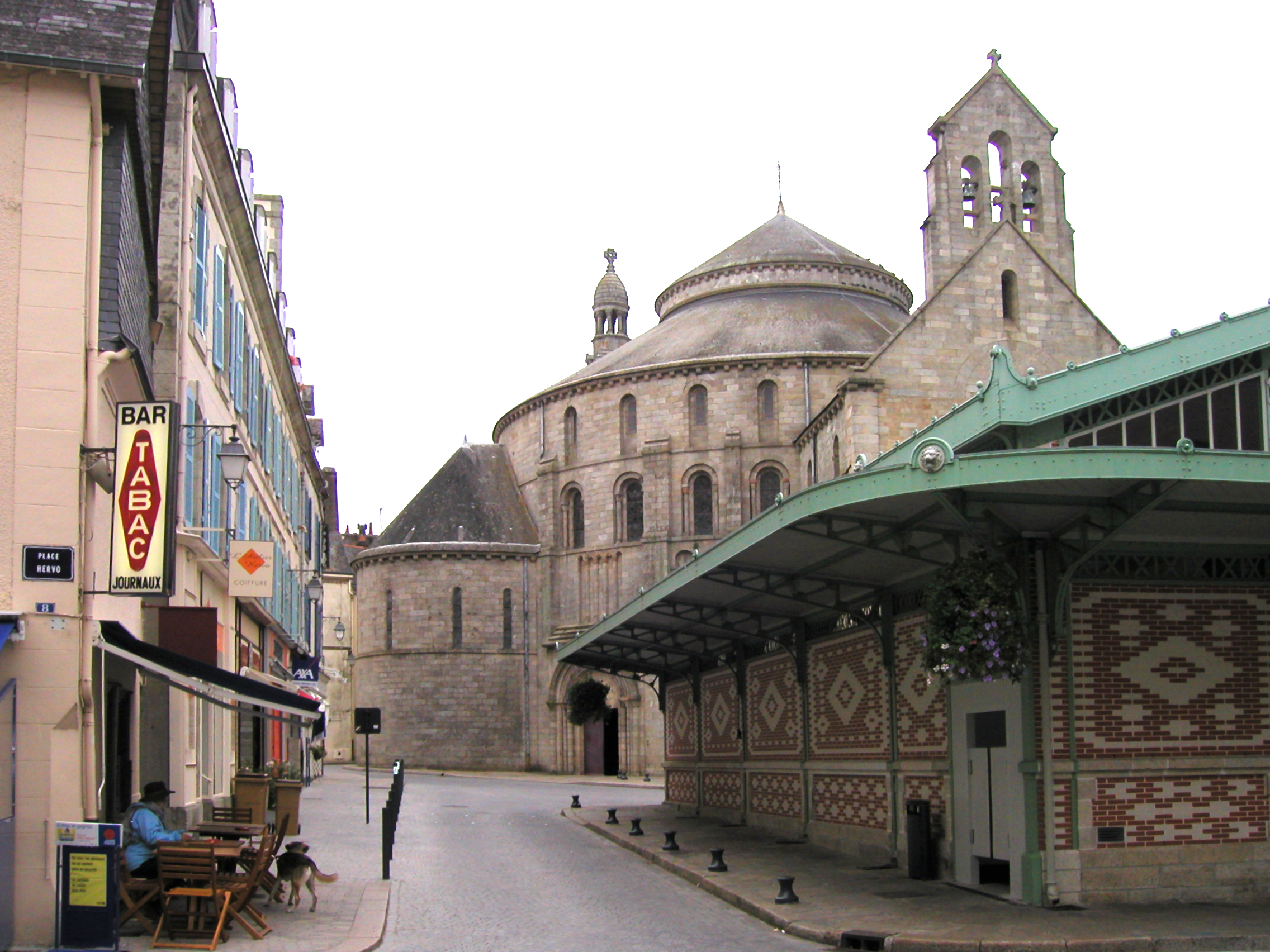
- Today's church in its urban setting

General information
- Status: Closed on 1792
- Type: Abbey
- Architectural style: Romanesque architecture, Neo-romanesque
- Location: Quimperlé commune, Finistère department, Bretagne region., France
- Coordinates: 47°52′21″N 3°32′42″W
- Year built: 1029 to 1050
- Owner: Roman Catholic Diocese of Quimper

Design and construction
- Awards: Monument historique (1840, church) Monument historique (1926, cloister)
- Designations: Benedictines (1029-1665) Congregation of Saint Maur (1665-1792)

Sainte-Croix de Quimperlé Abbey is a former Benedictine abbey located in the town of Quimperlé, in the French department of Finistère, within the Brittany region.

According to popular tradition, it was founded in 1029 by Saint Gurloës, thanks to a donation from Alain Canhiart, Count of Cornouaille; in reality, the foundation probably took place between 1040 and 1050. It was one of Brittany's most powerful abbeys, with numerous priories and other outbuildings. Placed under the commende regime in 1553, the abbey declined somewhat, until it was taken over by the Congregation of Saint Maur in 1665.

The abbey was closed during the French Revolution. It had a large library, rich in ancient and precious manuscripts; this literary treasure was then looted and scattered. Only the Sainte-Croix de Quimperlé cartulary was saved from destruction by Le Guillou, a Quimperlé doctor. The abbey church became a parish church, and the conventual buildings were transformed into public buildings, housing the district court and the gendarmerie barracks. The church was listed as a historic monument in 1840, and the cloister in 1926.

However, the bell tower built on top of the rotunda by the Mauristes weakened the latter, and restoration work was unable to prevent its collapse on March 21, 1862, at noon. In its fall, it destroyed most of the church, leaving only the monks' choir and the crypt below intact. The building was rebuilt from 1864 onwards by diocesan architect Joseph Bigot, according to plans by Émile Boeswillwald.

The abbey church, built at the end of the 11th century, is a rare example of a Romanesque church with a centered plan; the only other example in Brittany is the rotunda at Lanleff. These plans were inspired by the rotunda of the Holy Sepulchre in Jerusalem. However, the present rotunda is merely a reconstruction of the earlier building. The monks' choir and crypt bear witness to the architectural quality of the original church. The original capitals can still be seen, as can the blind arcatures in the apse.

The church boasts a wealth of furnishings, including numerous objects protected as historic monuments. Some of these, such as the pulpit and high altar, were made for the newly rebuilt church in the second half of the 19th century; others, originating elsewhere, were subsequently installed here; still others remain from the original building, such as the tomb of Saint Gurloës in the crypt, and the furniture and wall decorations in the sacristy.

== Location ==
The abbey is located in Quimperlé in the French department of Finistère. It lies at the confluence of the Isole and Ellé rivers, which form the Laïta, navigable to the sea some ten kilometers away. Thanks to the digging of moats that join the Ellé and Isole rivers, its territory is an artificial island, protected from the surrounding land. With the Laïta River serving as a port, and located on the main route between Quimper and Nantes, the religious establishment was at the heart of the development of the town of Quimperlé.

== History ==
=== Foundation ===
Legend has it that Quimperlé Abbey is the successor to a pre-existing monastery founded in the 6th century by Gonthiern, an exiled British prince, at a place called Anaurot. This monastery was destroyed by the Normans in 878. The Count of Cornouaille Alain Canhiart (1029-1058), accompanied by his brother Orscand, Bishop of Cornouaille, founded the present abbey. The Quimperlé cartulary states that the abbey was founded on September 14, 1029, the day of the Feast of the Exaltation of the Holy Cross, after an illness of the Count; however, this is probably a falsification in the context of a conflict with the Saint-Sauveur abbey in Redon, and the actual date of foundation is more likely to have been around 1045–1050.

However, it is certain that the church was restored in 1083, when the relics of the first abbot, Gurloes, a former monk of Redon who died in 1057, were raised in the crypt in a vain attempt to promote his cult: Pope Urban II was opposed to this cult, for lack of duly documented miracles. The sponsor of this work was undoubtedly Benoît, son of the founder Alain Canhiart, a former Landévennec monk who became abbot of the family foundation. By the end of the 11th century, the abbey had fourteen dependencies between Nantes and Concarneau, as well as possessions on Belle-Île-en-Mer. These possessions were the subject of a legal dispute with the abbey of Redon in the 1110s. At this time, the abbey of Sainte-Croix de Quimperlé was favored by bishop Robert.

From the end of the 11th century until the 15th century, when an altarpiece was installed in the west entrance, the buildings underwent few changes. The northern chapel was rebuilt in 1476.

=== From in commendam to Maurist reform ===
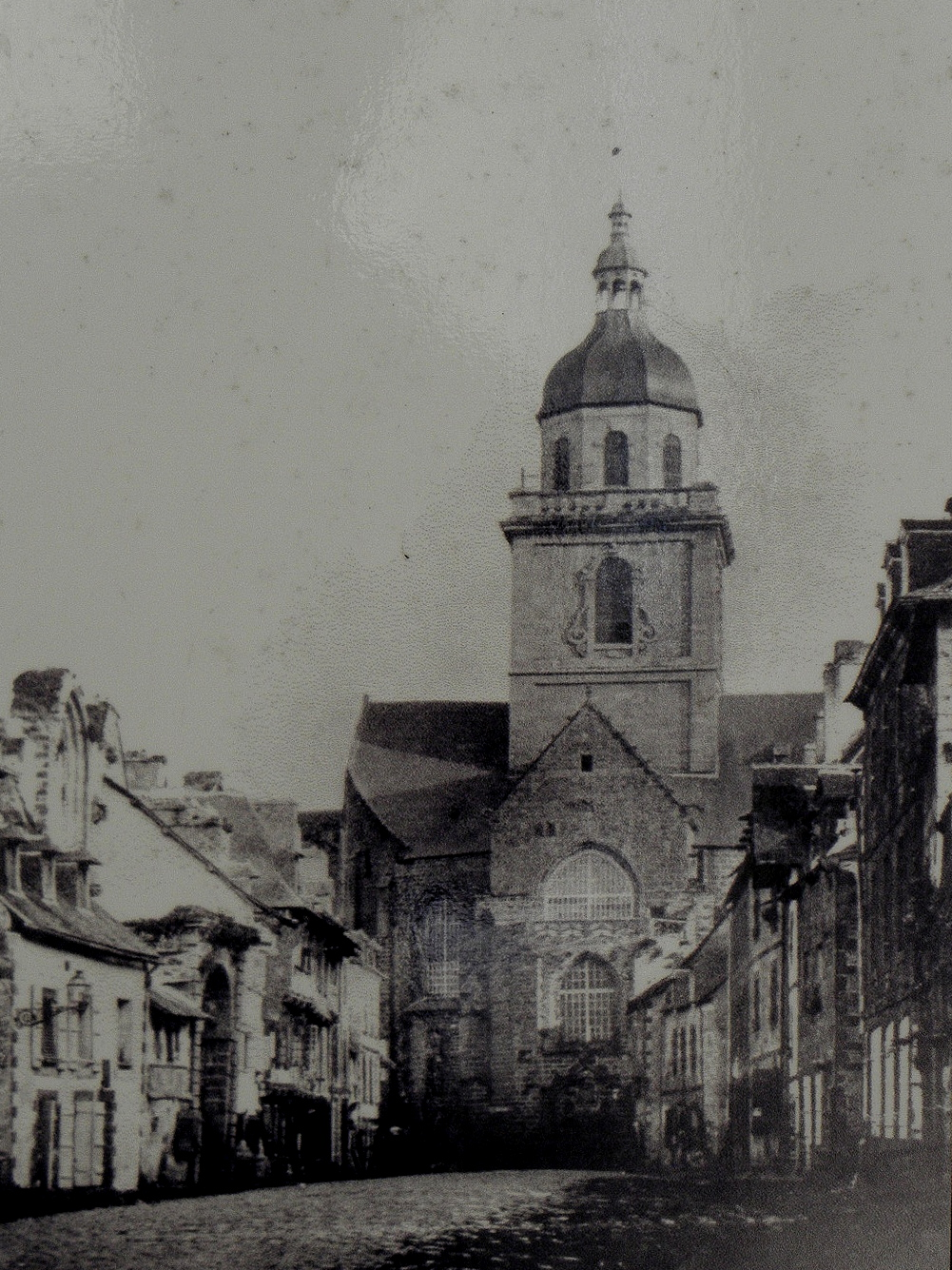
The abbey before 1862, with the bell tower built by the Mauristes.

Placed under the commende regime in 1553, the abbey went into relative decline, with less maintenance of the buildings, particularly the church. The treasure disappeared. As for the crypt housing the relics of Saint Gurloës, it became a meeting place.

From 1665, the abbey belonged to the Benedictines of the Saint-Maur congregation, who re-established regular life according to the rule of Saint Benedict. They carried out extensive renovation work on the buildings, particularly the cloister buildings, and added a 56 m-high lantern tower to the church. Stability problems soon arose, and by 1728 the transept pillars supporting the tower had to be reinforced, as their weight had weakened them. A new rectangular porch was added to the west façade in 1730–1733.

=== Buildings after the abbey's demolition ===
The abbey became a parish church in 1802 and underwent its first restoration in 1805. By 1840, it had been listed as a historic monument. In 1848, the Historical Monuments Commission was alarmed by the state of the building, and Prosper Mérimée declared that the inhabitants of neighboring houses had damaged the supports and buttresses. A restoration project was entrusted to Jean-Baptiste Lassus, inspector of civil buildings, who recommended in 1860 that the tower be removed in order to save the edifice. The project was rejected by the municipality, which owned the building, and by the clergy.

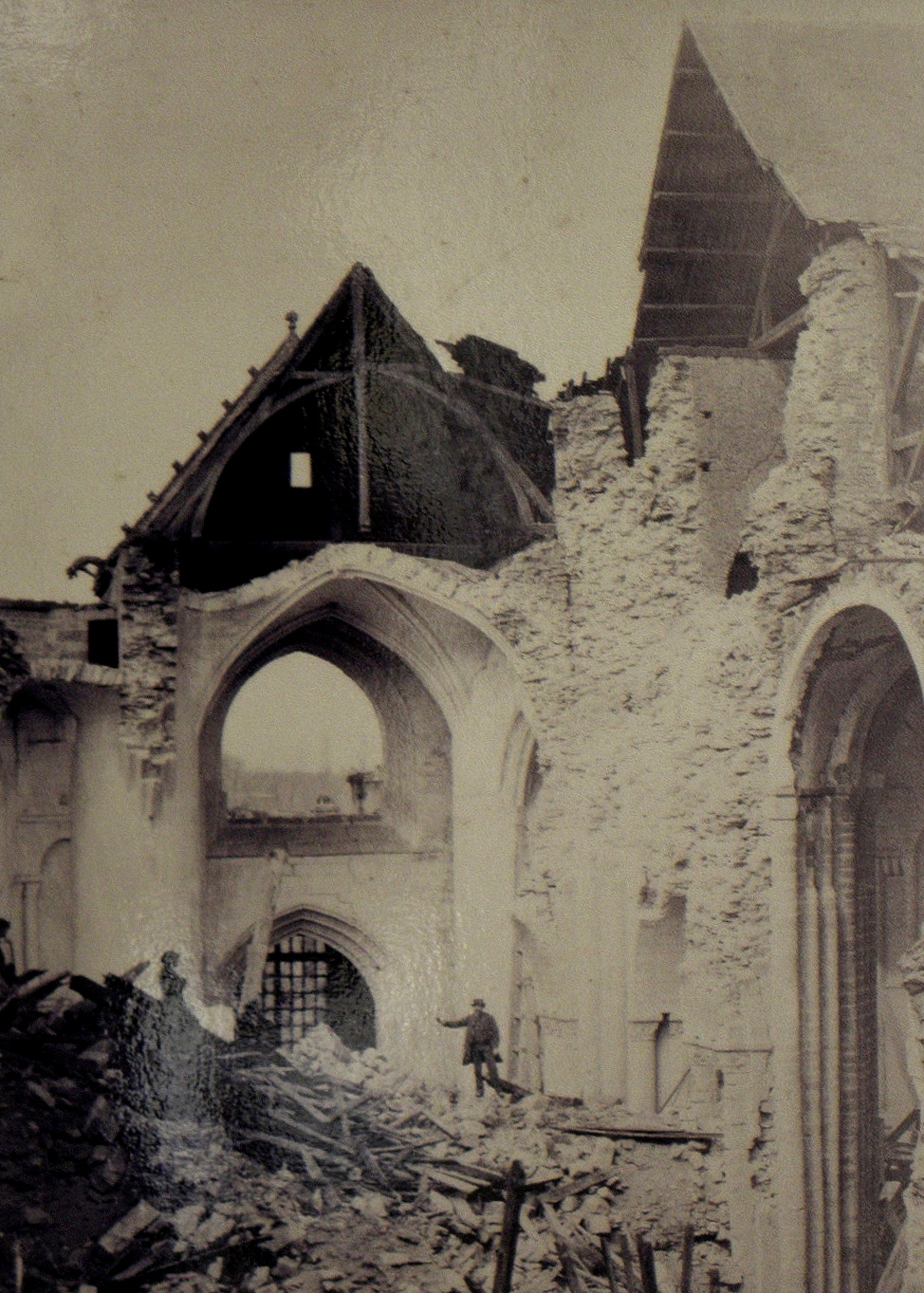
The abbey church after the bell tower collapsed in 1862.

When this failed, a reinforcement of the supports was undertaken in 1862, but the tower collapsed to the south when the doublets were bent on March 21, 1862, at 12 p.m., killing two people and destroying most of the abbey church. Only the crypt, the lower part of the chevet, and the northern portal remain intact.

After some hesitation as to the advisability of rebuilding the building, the project was entrusted to Émile Boeswillwald for the plans and Joseph Bigot for the execution. The church was rebuilt between 1864 and 1868. What remained of the vaults and the north portal, too weakened by dynamite, had to be demolished first, before construction was resumed from the foundations. Although he respected the original plan and the general lines of the elevation, the architect took considerable liberties, despite the existence of surveys and photographs, notably in the archives of historic monuments, by making "an approximate archaeological restitution". In particular, he raised the floor of the crossing to give direct access to the crypt, thus concealing the monks' choir from the entrance and considerably disrupting the upward perspective that had existed until then.

The cloister buildings were transformed from the 19th century onwards: in the first half of the century, the pavilion at the southeast corner housed the magistrates' court, before being demolished in the 1970s to build a post office. At the end of the 19th century, the abbey dwelling became the Hôtel du Lion d'or, and an upper floor was added. The cloister was listed as a historic monument on December 2, 1926.

In 1880, a comb bell tower was erected above the gable of the west façade. A separate bell tower, designed by Canon Jean-Marie Abgrall, was built to the east of the chevet in 1903.

=== Abbey life today ===
The former Sainte-Croix abbey church now belongs to the Saint-Colomban parish in the Quimperlé area. Mass is celebrated here every Sunday morning at 11 a.m.

=== The abbey's possessions ===
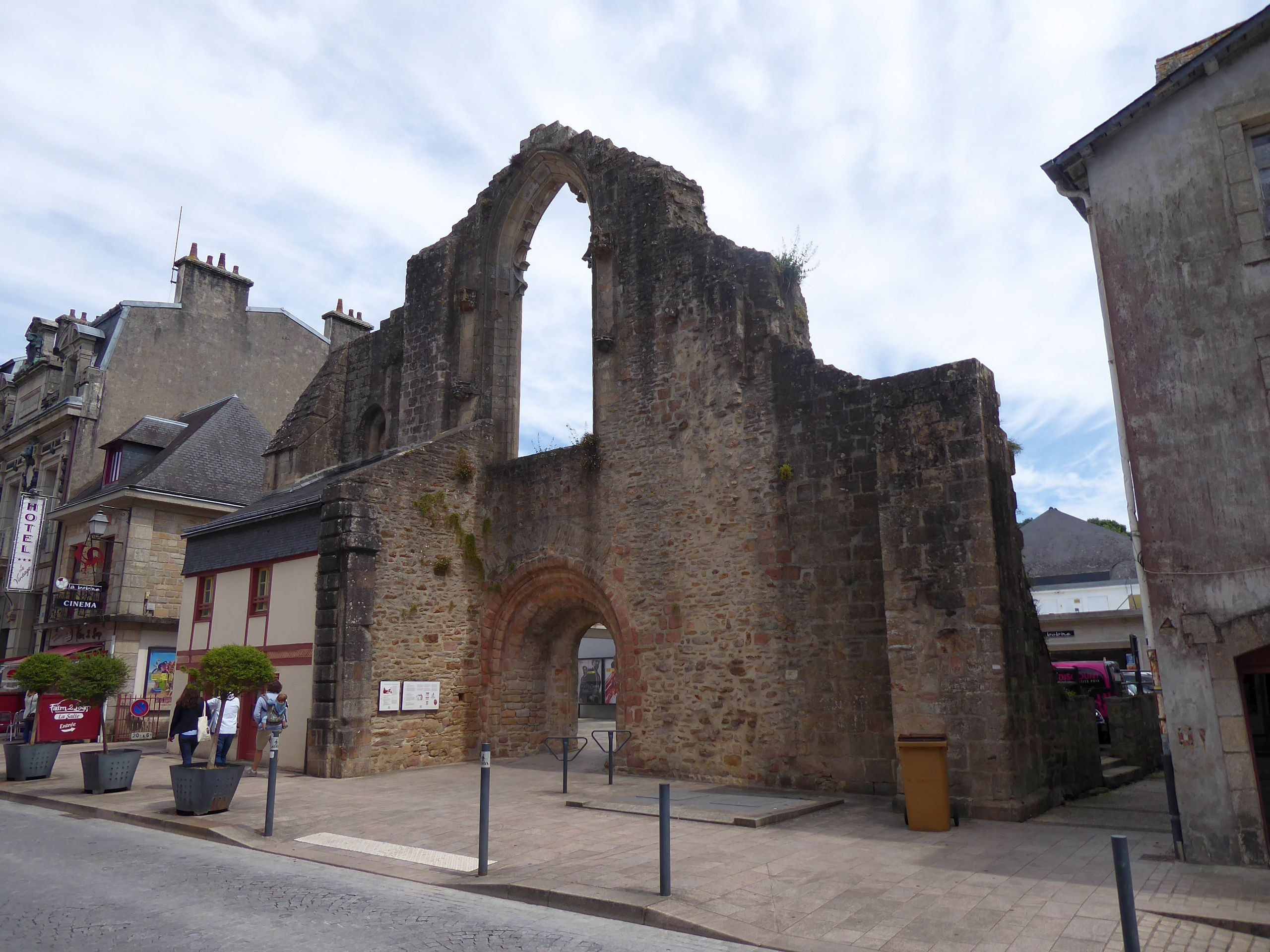
The ruins of the Saint-Colomban church in Quimperlé, a former abbey priory.

Founded by the family of the Counts of Cornouaille, which later became a ducal family, Quimperlé Abbey benefited from the generosity of its patrons and, by the 12th century, had built up a particularly rich estate. Its possessions included numerous priories: the priory of Lanchaillou de Nantes, now perhaps Saint-Félix, donated by Bishop Quiriace in 1076; the priory of Saint-Cado de Belz; the priory of Saint-Gérand du Palais, the priory of Sauzon; the priory of Saint-Ronan de Locronan, donated by Duke Pierre de Dreux; the priory of Saint-Laurent de Locamand en Fouesnant, which became the property of the Jesuits of Quimper in the 17th century; the priory of Saint-Guthiern de Doëlan; the priory of Landujen en Duault; the priory of Notre-Dame de Locmaria; the priory of Notre-Dame de Locmariaquer, which later passed into the hands of the abbey of Redon; the priory of Saint-Michel des Montagnes, on the island of Saint-Michel, in Ploemeur; the priory of Saint-Gurthiern on the island of Groix; the priories of Saint-Colomban and Sainte-Catherine in Quimperlé; the priory of Saint-Gilles de Pont-Briant in Guiscriff and the priory of Sainte-Catherine du Grillaud in Chantenay-sur-Loire;

The abbey also possessed several lordships, including that of Belle-Île-en-Mer, which was the subject of a legal dispute with the monks of Redon in the 1110s. This possession was ceded to the de Gondi family between 1570 and 1580, in exchange for lordships in Callac and Houzillé, near Vitré.

== Description ==
Abbey map

=== The church ===
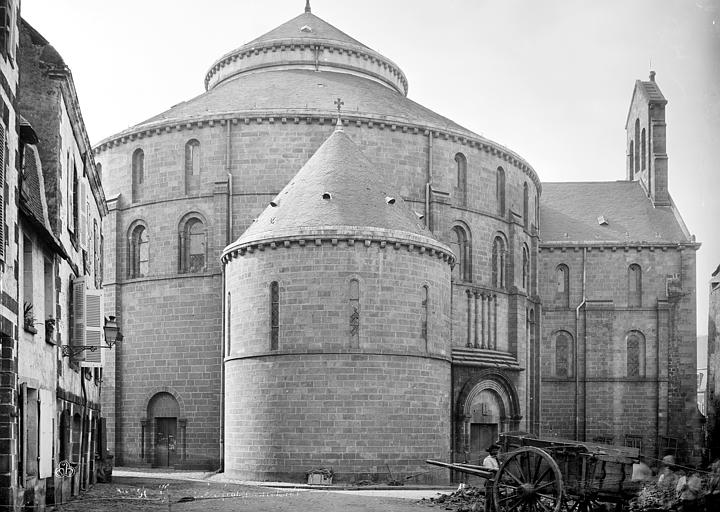
The church as seen from the north by Mieusement.

The church is built on an original plan, combining a particularly large circular rotunda with an equally large cruciform plan. Around the rotunda, an annular side aisle gives access to the west portal and three chapels to the north, south, and east. The eastern chapel is the largest, housing the monks' choir. The north–south axis reaches 41.20 m and the east–west axis 49.60 m. The dome covering the rotunda is 17.20 m high, and the collateral ring around it is 15.80 m high.

==== The crypt ====
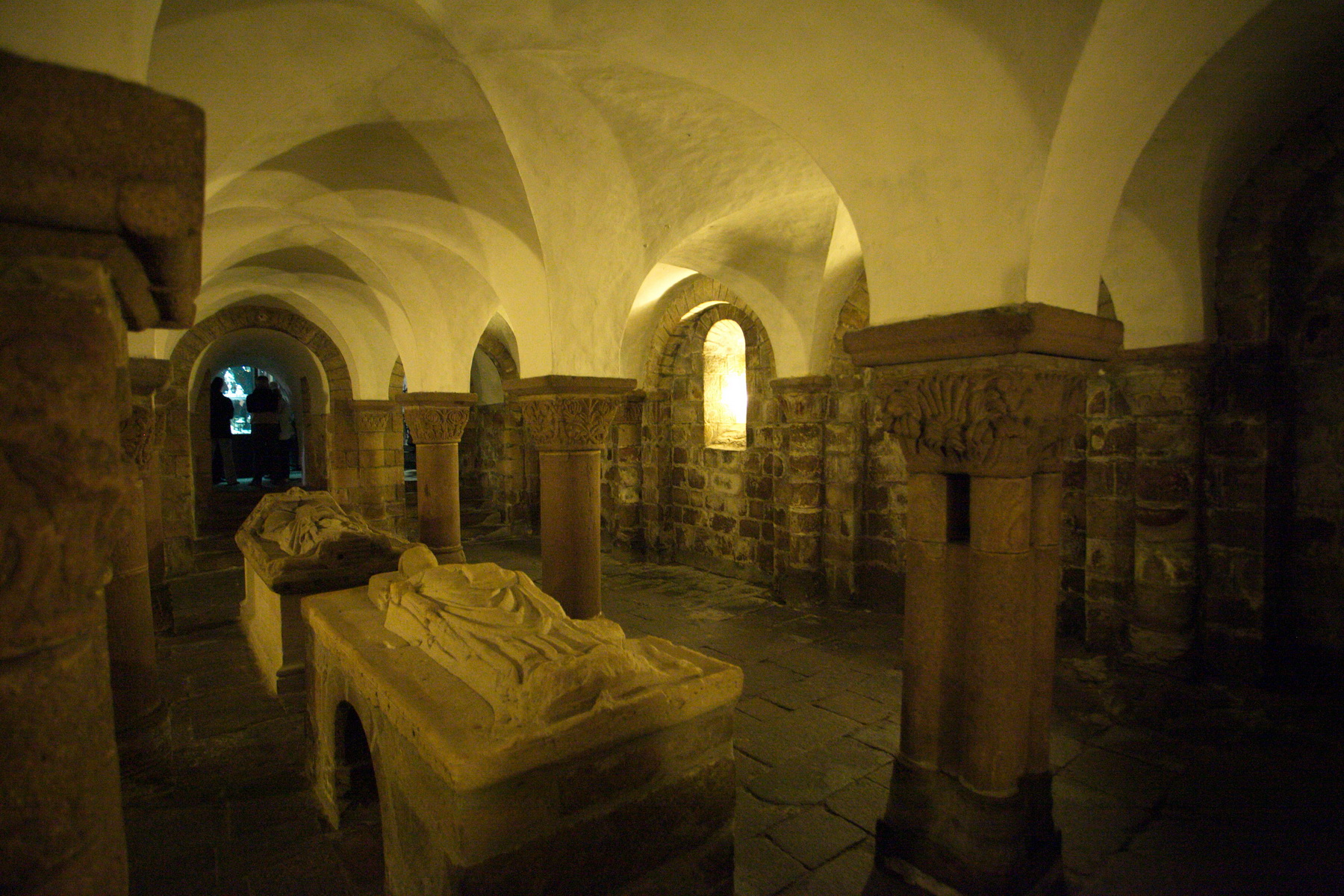
The crypt

The 11th-century crypt, located beneath the monks' choir, remained intact after the collapse of 1862. Built on a crypt-hall plan, it comprises three vessels and four bays, ending in an apse. Measuring 11.20 m long and 7.80 m wide, it is covered with groin vaults that fall on six cylindrical columns in the center, two supports composed of four engaged columns on a cylindrical core in the east, and engaged columns along the walls.

As the crypt was largely unaffected by the accident of 1862, all eighteen capitals are original, as are the column bases. The capitals of the columns on the side walls are fluted in the shape of a truncated cone, while those separating the three vessels are fluted in a cubic shape. They are carved with Corinthian-inspired plant motifs, with bunches of acanthus leaves. They respond to each other in pairs: those at the entrance, then those on the outer walls together, and those on the columns together. The complexity of their decoration is proportional to the proximity of Saint Guthiern's tomb.

The bases of the columns are also sculpted. Truncated cone-shaped, they are decorated with interlacing plant motifs, as at Landévennec or in the crypt of Nantes Cathedral.

==== The monk's choir ====
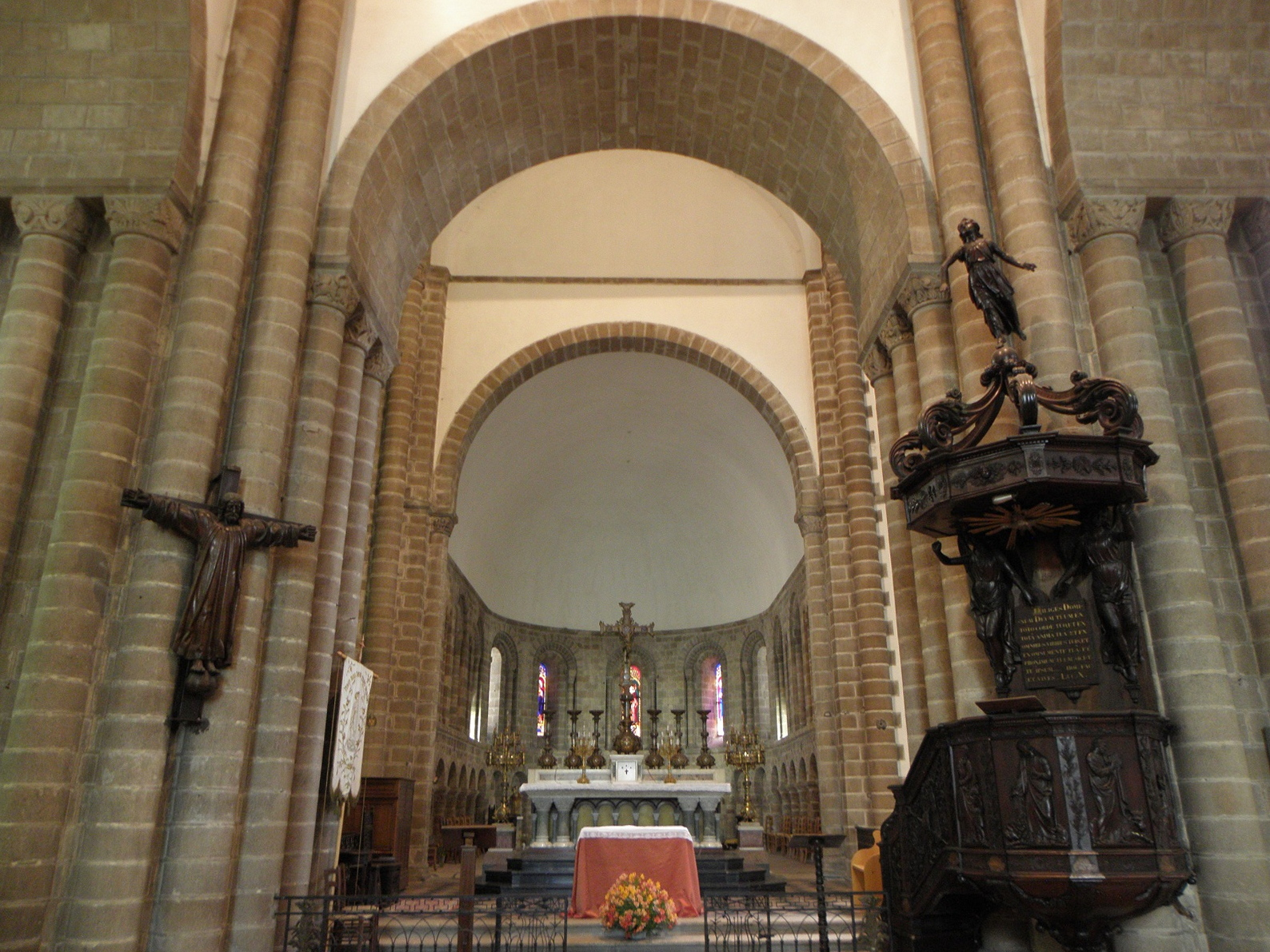
The monks' choir.

Above the crypt is the apse, also known as the monks' choir, which was largely unaffected during the collapse. The 13 m long, semi-dome apse is 10.30 m high. Eleven high, particularly deep windows illuminate it. Below the windows, eighteen blind single-roll arches fall on engaged columns reminiscent of those in the crypt.

Almost all the capitals in the apse are original, with the exception of one, which was rebuilt after the disaster of 1862. They feature two registers of vegetal decoration, often inspired by Corinthian motifs, from which the sculptor showed a certain freedom: small poly-lobed or hemmed leaves, even interlacing motifs in the lower register of some baskets. The upper register features large, angular leaves, or bouquets linked by a ring, sometimes with small animal or human heads.

==== The rotunda ====
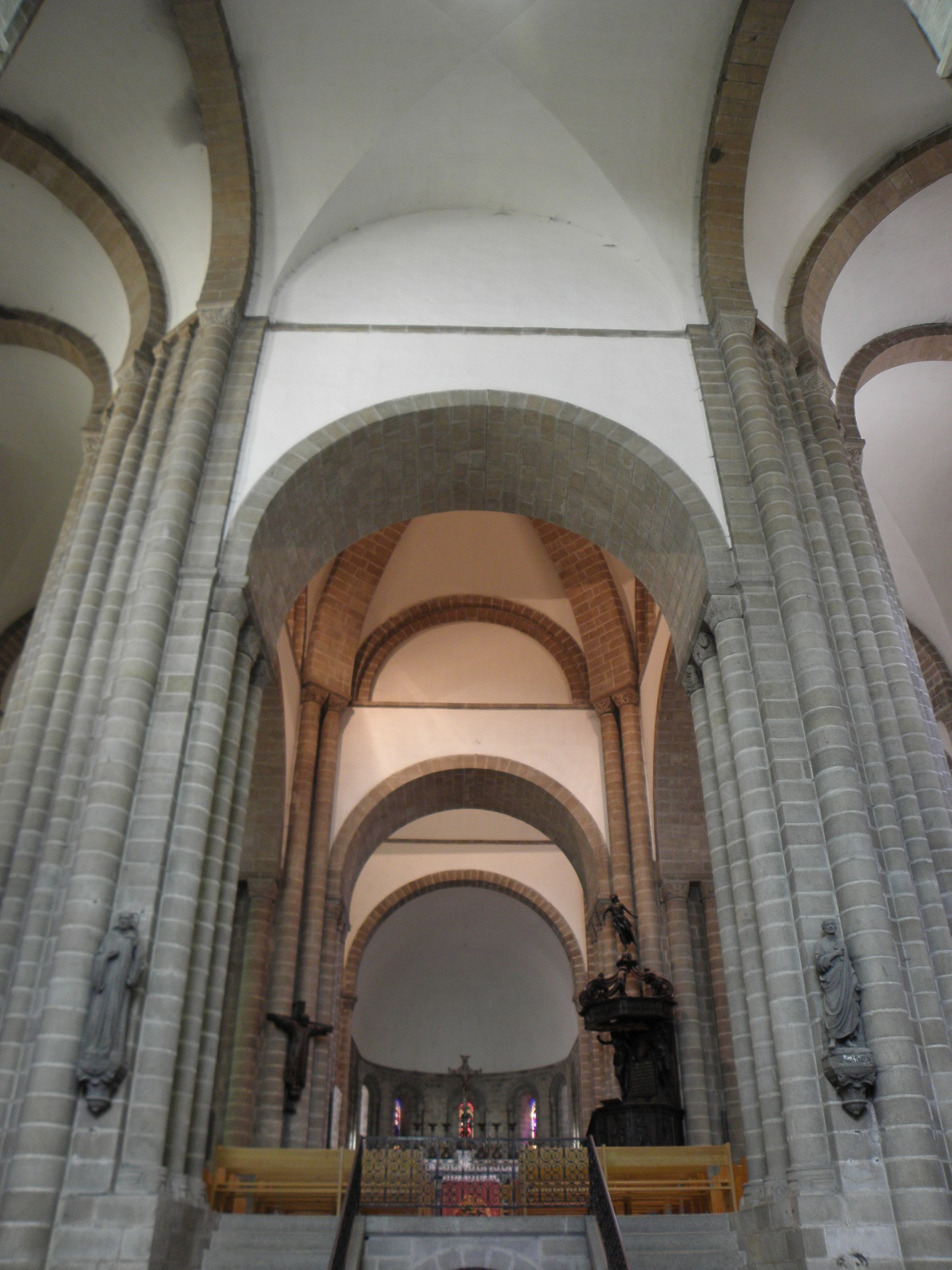
The rotunda

Sainte-Croix is the first fully-vaulted Romanesque building in Brittany. Along with the church at Lanleff in the Côtes-d'Armor, it is the only church in Brittany to have a circular plan, modeled on the Church of the Holy Sepulchre in Jerusalem. Unlike the latter, however, the original building did not feature a centered layout, but rather a longitudinal progression of spaces from east to west. The floor rose in levels along the 50 m of the main axis, leading the eye through the great arches of the crossing to the choir windows, which closed the perspective.

Joseph Bigot's reconstruction of the rotunda took up the dimensions of the Romanesque building. On the outside, a conical roof with a slight projection covers the rotunda, whose drum has three levels, the first blind, the others pierced with windows. Inside, in the center, four pillars are surrounded by fifteen engaged columns: three on the sides bear the arches that form the central vault; seven others, on the side aisle, receive the doubleaux of the barrel vault, which fall on the outside on other engaged columns. Towards the center of the rotunda, the last two engaged columns receive the wide arches of the central vault.

Some of the old capitals were reassembled during the reconstruction, on abacus that have all been replaced. Most of them feature high-quality plant motifs, sometimes with animals, or even human figures of lesser quality. Given the scale of the reconstruction, it is impossible today to determine whether there was a coherent iconographic scheme.

=== The cloister buildings ===
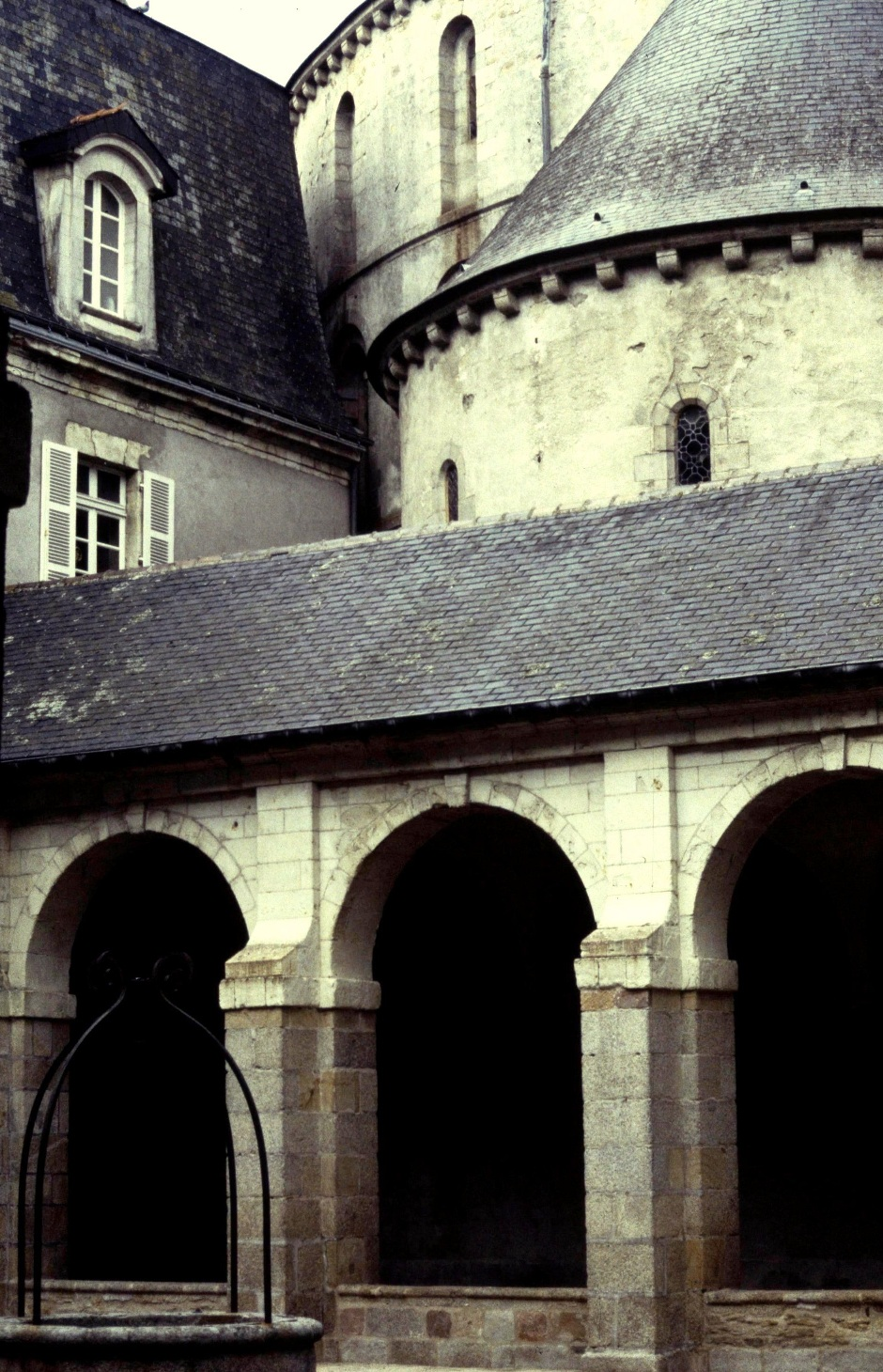
The abbey's cloister.

The cloister consists of four arcaded galleries, each five bays long. The arcades are supported by pillars, the lower part of which is made of granite and the upper part of tufa stone. The galleries are cross-vaulted. The cloister is built on the south side of the church, along which the north gallery runs. On the other three sides are the conventual buildings: three bodies flanked by pavilions at the corners. Each has a first floor, a first floor, and an attic. The west wing also has a basement. At each end of the south building, a staircase serves each level. On the east side, the staircase is built in granite, with banister after banister; on the west side, it is curved and rests on a barrel vault. Built in granite up to the second floor, it serves the attic floor, but in carpentry. The southeast corner pavilion has disappeared; it was replaced by the Post Office in the 1970s.

=== The furnishing ===
The church contains a very rich collection of furnishings: no fewer than forty-five objects are listed as historic monuments. Others, although neither listed nor classified, are also of interest.

==== The high altar ====
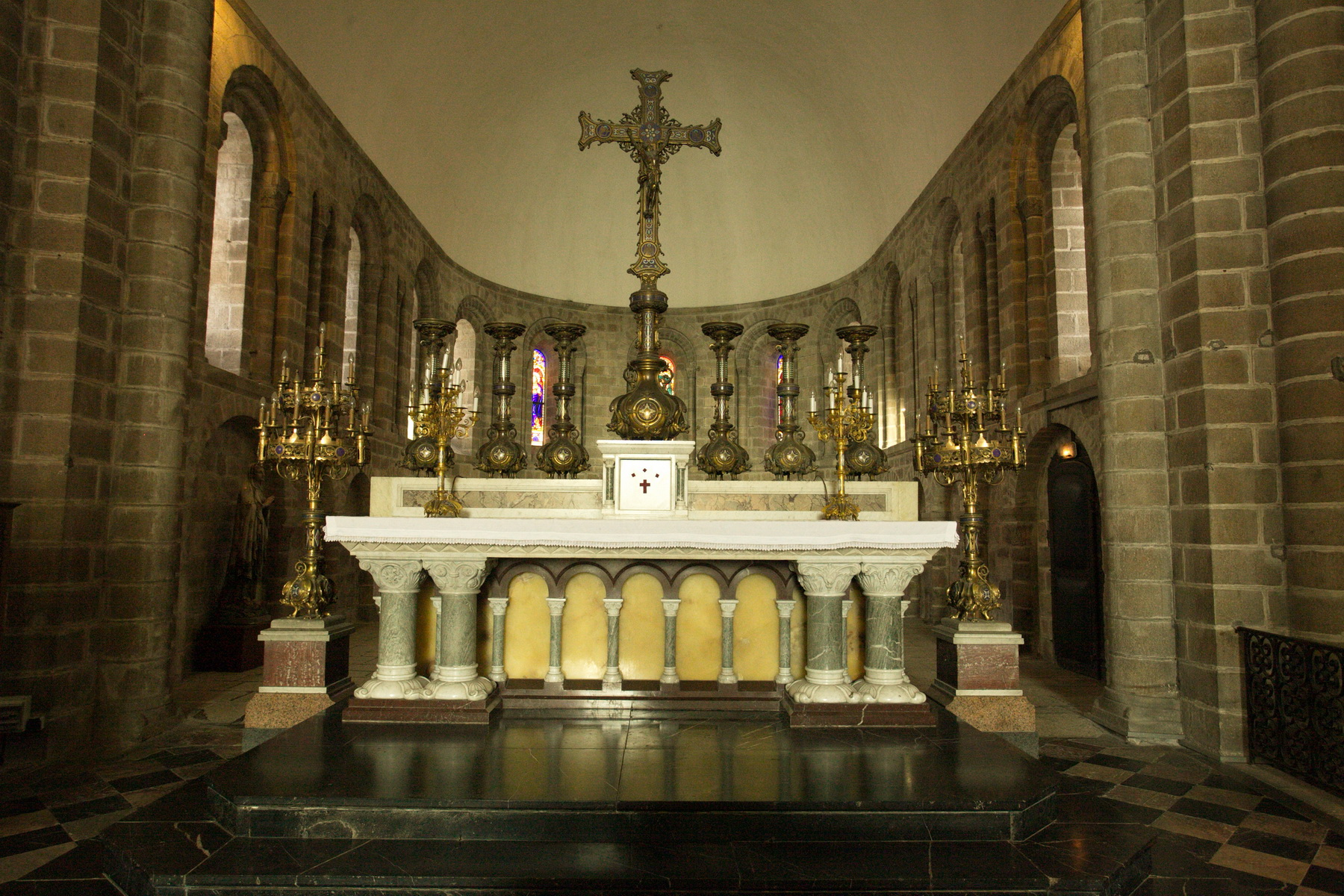
The high altar with cross and candlesticks by Poussielgue-Rusand (on the side).

After the church collapsed in 1862, much of the furniture had to be replaced, including the high altar. The new set is said to have been donated by Empress Eugénie around 1865. Neo-Romanesque in style, it is inspired by the church's decoration, particularly the capitals. Made of white, black, green, and red veined marble, it is surrounded on all sides by three steps and topped by a tabernacle. The whole is over 3 m wide and 1.5 m high. For this altar, the goldsmith Placide Poussielgue-Rusand created a cross and two candlesticks in gilded metal and cloisonné compacted oxide layer glaze, which are mounted on supports on either side of the altar. The ensemble was listed as a historic monument on June 27, 1996.

==== The large stone altarpiece ====
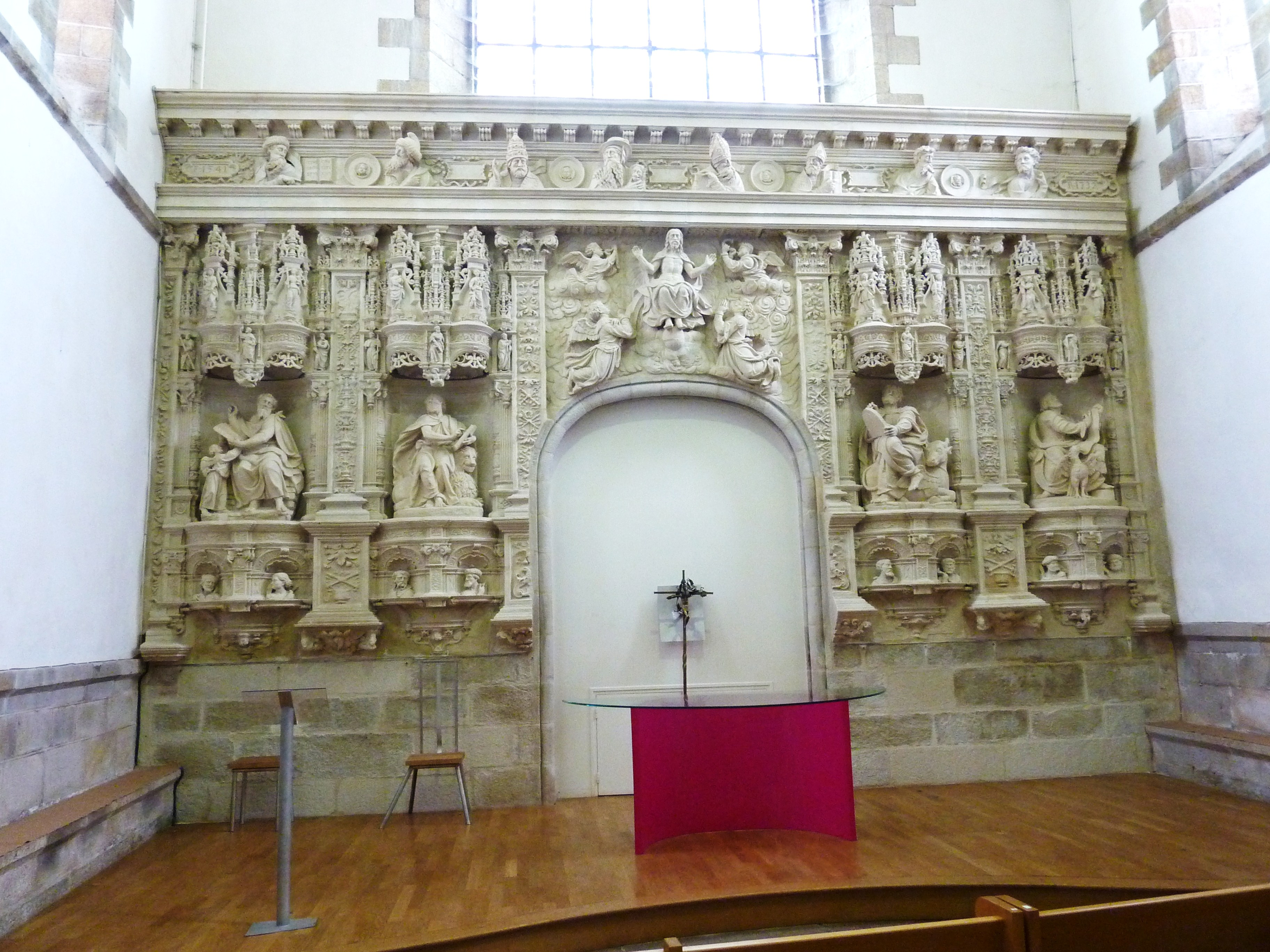
The stone altarpiece.

On the western wall of the church's west arm is a large limestone altarpiece carved in high relief. Commissioned in 1541 by Abbot Daniel de Saint-Alouarn, it originally stood opposite the north entrance, i.e. the church's main door. This was a particularly ambitious work of art, displaying the entire stylistic repertoire of the early Renaissance, as expressed in the Loire Valley, for example at Solesmes: the commission may well have been placed with Loire Valley artists. In 1732, it was dismantled and reassembled in its present location by Rennes sculptor Julien Morillon. On this occasion, the central section was removed to make way for a door in the west arm. The sculptor also restored certain parts, notably the statues of the evangelists and Christ. He thus introduced a style profoundly different from that of the Renaissance. The ensemble survived the collapse of 1862. Restoration took place in 2003. The altarpiece is a vast composition at the center of which sits the Christ of the Apocalypse, adored by four angels. Around him, several sections feature the Evangelists, the Apostles, the Virgin Mary, the Theological and Cardinal Virtues, the Prophets, and the Doctors of the Church. The whole is particularly imposing, measuring 8.5 m wide by 5.5 m high. Together with the church, it is listed as a historic monument, as it is a building by destination.

==== The Burial of Jesus group sculpture ====
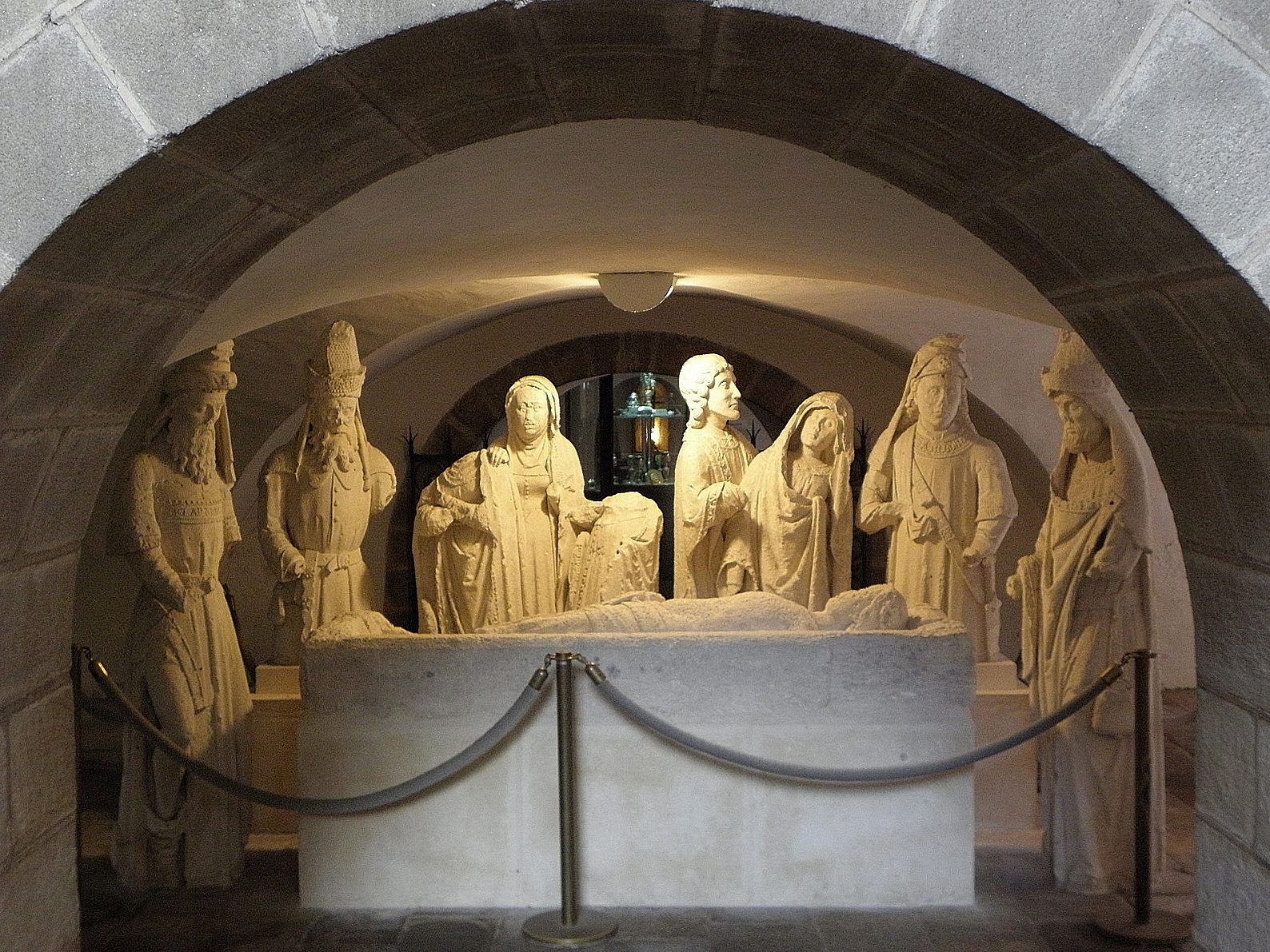
Burial of Jesus

In the crypt, beneath the transept crossing, stands a sculpted group of ten stone statues depicting the Burial of Jesus. Dating from the late 15th or 16th century, it comes from the chapel of the Dominican convent in Quimperlé, where it was still standing at the time of the French Revolution. It may have been donated either by prior Guillaume de Botderu, or by the de Quimerc'h family, who belonged to the ducal court. Around the time of the Revolution, it was transferred to the Sainte-Croix church, where it escaped the 1862 collapse. Moved to the garden of the presbytery for renovation work, it remained there until 1956, when its condition deteriorated. After restoration by Maimponte in 1962–1967, it was moved to its present location. In 1967, during this restoration, a thief stole the heads of St. John and two of the Holy Women, which had been unsealed at the time. The ensemble has been listed as a historic monument since November 2, 1956.

==== The crypt tombs ====
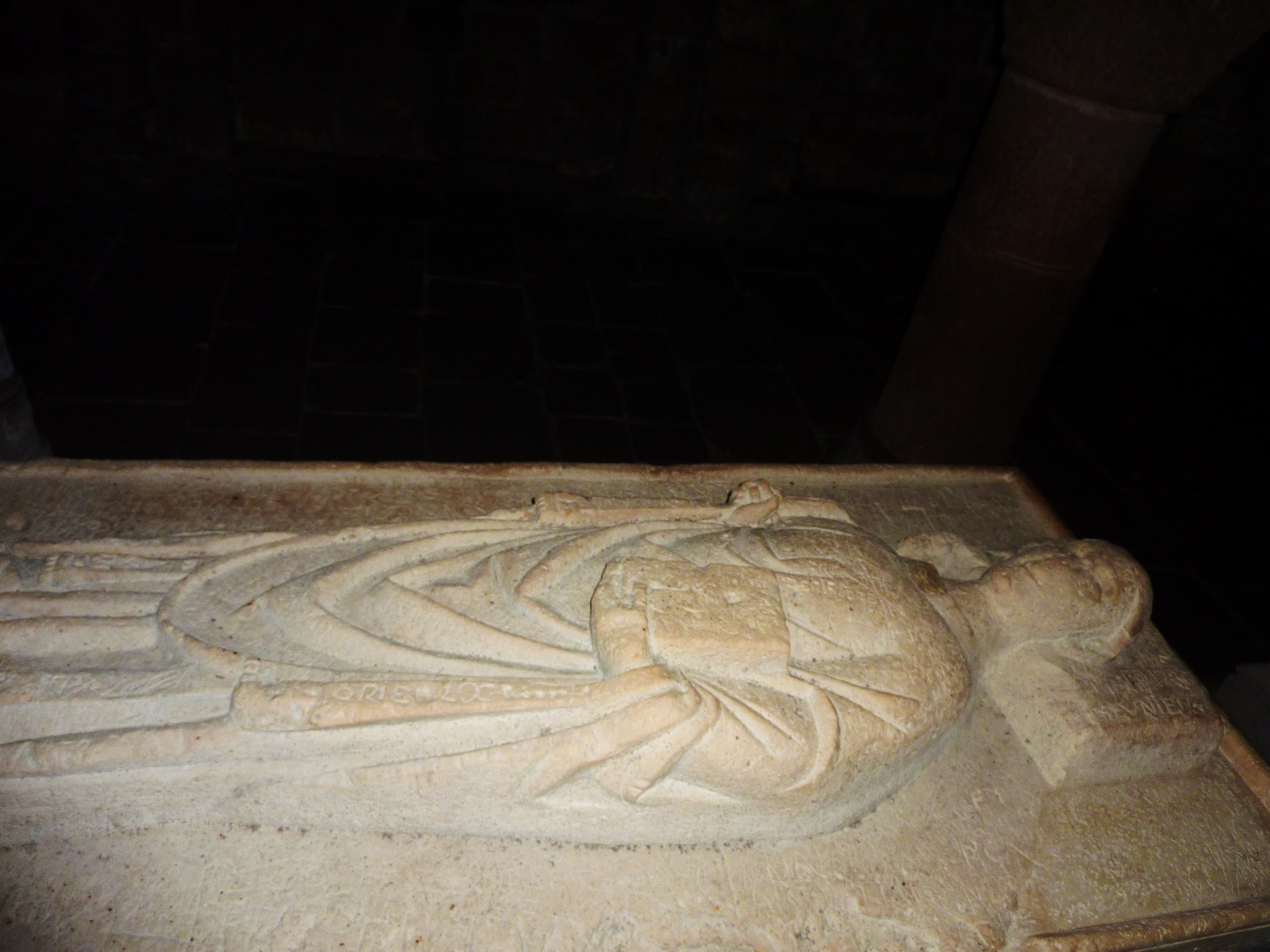
The tomb of St. Gurloës.

In the crypt beneath the monks' choir lie two tombs: that of Saint Gurloës and that of Abbot Henry de Lespervez.

The tomb of the first abbot, Gurloës, is located in the center of the crypt. It features a granite base surmounted by a recumbent statue carved in limestone, possibly from the Loire Valley. The recumbent holds a crosier in his right hand, a book in his left, and a dragon at his feet. This tomb is not the one that was built in the hope of promoting the saint's cult at the end of the 11th century: it is clearly a new tomb built at the end of the 14th or beginning of the 15th century. A conduit runs through the base: it was used for the insane and for people suffering from headaches or gout, so that the saint could cure them of their illnesses. Numerous graffiti have defaced the tomb, testifying to the veneration in which Gurloës was held. The tomb, a building by destination, was listed as a historic monument along with the church on the 1840 list.

The second tomb is that of Henry de Lespervez, abbot of Quimperlé from 1409 to 1434. The recumbent tomb depicts the abbot under a canopy, with two dogs at his feet, bearing his coat of arms (Sand color, three golden twin stripes). The edge of the slab is carved with the Virgin and Child. This tomb originally stood in the Notre-Dame church in Quimperlé, which he had commissioned. The sculpture is of the highest quality. The tomb was already in the church in 1840 and, as a building by destination, is, like its predecessor, listed as a historic monument in the 1840 list.

==== The statues ====
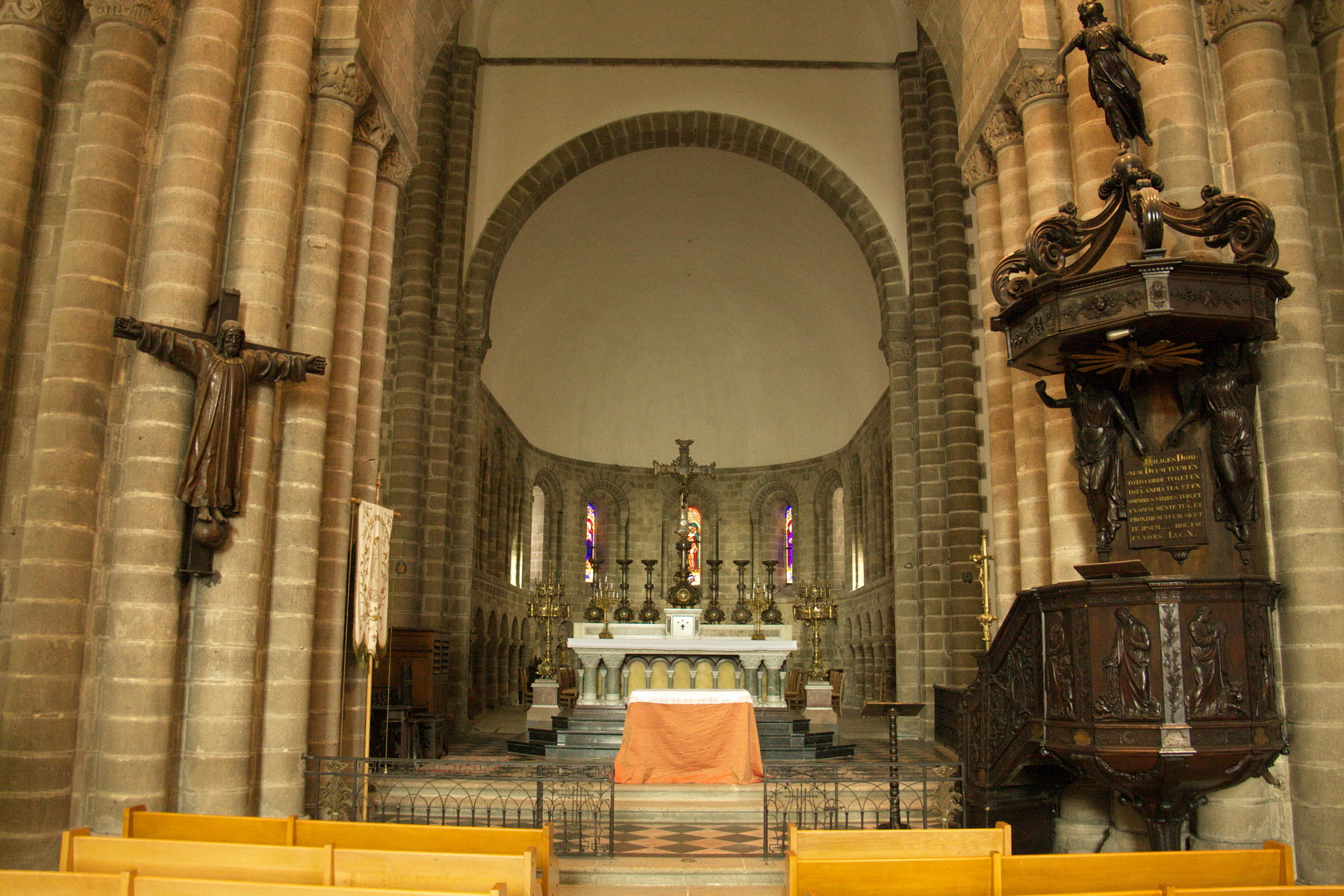
The clothed Christ on the cross (left) and the pulpit (right).

The former abbey church contains numerous statues protected as historic monuments. Others are not protected or have uncertain status.

In the western arm, through which the entrance is made, a statue of the Virgin and Child, known as Notre-Dame de la Délivrance, dates from the 17th century. It was listed as a historic monument on July 15, 1993.

Hanging from the north pillar of today's choir is a large statue of Christ on the cross, wearing a tunic and with his feet resting on a globe. It is probably a copy made after the 1862 disaster by a sculptor named Le Brun of a statue that has been in the church since the 17th century. It has been listed as a historic monument since December 4, 1912.

In the northern arm is a statue of Saint Helena in polychrome and gilded wood, probably made after the building collapsed and was rebuilt. Neoclassical in inspiration, it has suffered a few setbacks: its forearms are broken and attached. It was listed as a historic monument on July 15, 1993. Another polychrome wooden statue of the Virgin Mary is called Notre-Dame de Vérité. Carved in the second half of the 17th century, it has also been listed as a historical monument since July 15, 1993. A 16th-century statue of the Suffering Christ is also preserved in this part of the church, and was listed as a historic monument on July 15, 1993.

In the ambulatory, between the south arm and the choir, stands a polychrome painted oak statue of Saint James as a pilgrim, wearing a hat and carrying a purse stamped with the shell. Dating from the 16th century, the statue has suffered over time, notably losing its staff. It was listed as a historic monument on July 15, 1993.

In the southern arm, along the west wall, a painted and polychrome wooden statue of Saint Marguerite was donated by the bishopric of Quimper in 1998. The saint is standing on a dragon. The object dates from the 17th century and was restored after the diocese's donation. Its protection status is uncertain. Another statue of the Virgin, known as Notre-Dame de Bonne Nouvelle, dates from the 17th century. As it is not carrying a child, it may have belonged to a group of the Holy Family, or it may be a statue of a saint who became famous later on. It was listed as a historic monument on July 15, 1993. A third polychrome wooden statue, the oldest, represents the Virgin and Child. Carved in the late 14th or early 15th century, it, like the previous one, was listed as a historic monument on July 15, 1993. A fourth, again depicting the Virgin and Child, and known as Notre-Dame des Fleurs, may date from the first half of the 16th century. It has also been listed as a historic monument since July 15, 1993.

In the sacristy, we find a wooden statue of a saint identified as Saint Dominic, possibly dating from the 16th century. It has been listed as a historic monument since July 15, 1993. Also on display is a statue of Pope St. Cornelius, or Cornély, probably made in the first half of the 19th century. Wearing a tiara, he holds a cross in his left hand and has a bull's head at his feet. It has been listed as a historic monument since the same date as Saint Dominique. A polychrome wooden statue of Saint Roch accompanied by his dog, dressed as a pilgrim and showing his wound, is also preserved in this room. Like the previous one, it was produced in the first half of the 19th century, and was listed as a historic monument on the same date. The same protection decree also listed a polychrome wooden statue from the 17th century, originally depicting the Trinity, with God enthroned and the dove of the Holy Spirit clasping his cope. The Christ on the Cross that was supposed to complete the group is missing. This carved group may have originally been found in the chapel of Lothéa, also in Quimperlé. This room also contains a statue of the Virgin and Child, likewise listed as a historic monument on July 15, 1993. It dates from the 17th century.

==== The Adoration of the Magi painting ====
In the western arm, a painting depicting the Adoration of the Magi hangs on the north wall, along with scenes from the Nativity and the Flight into Egypt. Signed by the otherwise unknown painter J. Bizien, it bears the date 1635 and the name of its patron, Jean Auffret, syndic of the town of Quimperlé in 1629. The style of the painting is reminiscent of seventeenth-century Flemish painting. It originally stood in the Notre-Dame church in Quimperlé, from where it was brought in 1963. It has been listed as a historic monument since December 4, 1914.

==== The pulpit ====
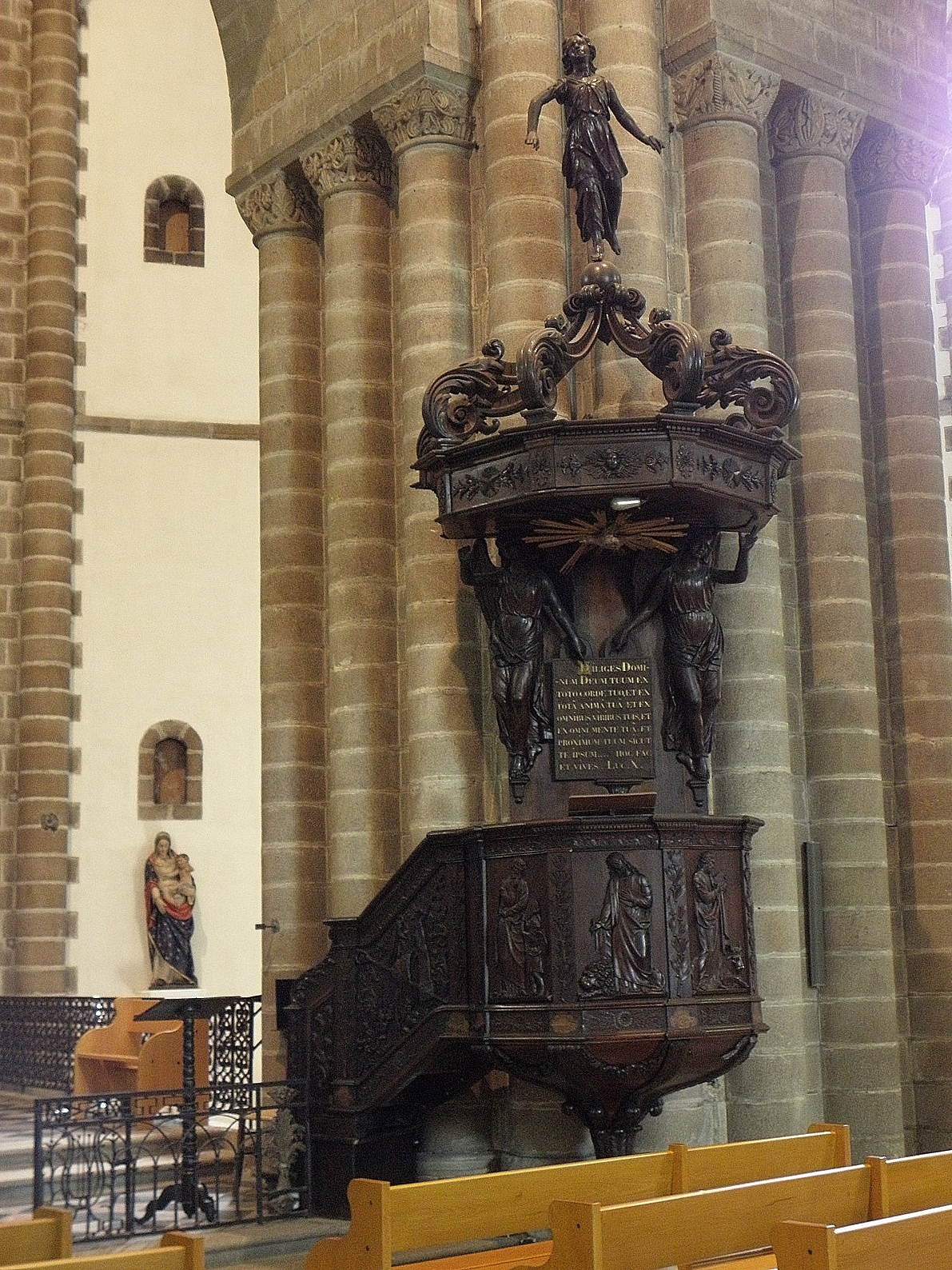
The pulpit

The church's pulpit was built in the second half of the 19th century, following the reconstruction of the collapsed church. Made of oak and chestnut, it features an octagonal vat, a staircase with a banister, and an abat-voix. Four of the vat's side panels are carved with high-reliefs depicting the four evangelists, Matthew, Mark, Luke, and John. The canopy is supported by caryatid angels and surmounted by the Angel of Renown; the dove of the Holy Spirit is depicted on the inside. The banister of the access staircase is also sculpted, this time in the mass. A Latin inscription is taken from the Gospel of Saint Luke. The whole is over 6 m high and 2.60 m wide. The pulpit was listed as a historic monument by decree on July 15, 1993.

==== The baptismal font ====
Between the staircases leading up to the choir, near the burial sculpted group, are the baptismal fonts: a square base of black marble veined with white supports an oval basin in the same material. The basin is closed by a bronze cover. The whole is 1.10 m high, 90 cm wide, and 64 cm deep. Installed in the church after reconstruction in 1864, it is not listed as a historic monument.

==== The stoup ====
In the western arm, which serves as the entrance to the church, stands a white-black veined marble stoup. The basin is in the shape of a large mollusc shell: 1.57 m wide and 82 cm deep. It rests on a tripartite base; just beside it are the remains of a small oval stoup on the floor. Both objects could date from the late 18th or early 19th century. Neither of these objects is listed as a historical monument.

==== The sacristy ====
In 1704, following restoration work undertaken by the Mauristes at the abbey, Abbot Guillaume Charrier commissioned sculptor and carpenter Pierre Le Dieu to create a set of oak and chestnut paneling and sacristy furniture for the newly rebuilt sacristy. The ensemble consists of a paneling frame, several low sideboards, a chasuble, and two corner cupboards covering the room's north, south, and west walls. The decor is composed of sober panels with strongly projecting frames, pilasters with Corinthian capitals, and a plant frieze topped by a dentil cornice running along the top of the paneling. The breadth of this furniture and the quality of the craftsmanship make it one of the finest sacristy furnishings in Cornouaille. In the 19th century, stalls, a prie-Dieu, a confessional, and two other chasubles in the center of the room were added to this ensemble. The sacristy's décor is included in the 1840 list as a historic monument.

== See also ==
=== Bibliography ===
- ^{(fr)} Anne Autissier, La sculpture romane en Bretagne, xie – xiie siècle, Rennes, Presses universitaires de Rennes, 2005 (ISBN 978-2-7535-0066-2).
- ^{(fr)} Anne Autissier, "Quimperlé. Eglise Sainte-Croix", Congrès archéologique de France "Finistère 2007", 2009, p. 319-324.
- ^{(fr)} Xavier Barral i Altet, Art roman en Bretagne, Paris, Ed. Jean-Paul Gisserot, 2005 (ISBN 978-2-87747-711-6), p. 10-11.
- ^{(fr)} Dom Jean-Martial Besse, Abbayes et prieurés de l'ancienne France, vol. VIII : Province ecclésiastique de Tours, Paris, Picard, 1920.
- ^{(fr)} Marc Déceneux, La Bretagne romane, Rennes, Ed. Ouest-France, 1998 (ISBN 2-7373-2262-6).
- ^{(fr)} André Mussat, Arts et cultures de Bretagne ; un millénaire, Paris, Berger-Levrault, 1979 (ISBN 978-2-7373-1932-7).
- ^{(fr)} Joëlle Quaghebeur, La Cornouaille du IXe au XIIe siècle : mémoire, pouvoir, noblesse, Rennes, Presses universitaires de Rennes, 2002 (ISBN 2-86847-743-7).
- ^{(fr)} Louise-Marie Tillet, Bretagne romane, La Pierre-Qui-Vire, Zodiaque, coll. "La Nuit des Temps", 1982.

=== Related articles ===
- fr:Cartulaire de Quimperlé
- fr:Liste des églises du Finistère
- fr:Liste des édifices romans en Bretagne
- fr:Liste des monuments historiques du Finistère
- Chapelle de Lothéa
