= Quimperlé =

Quimperlé Kemperle
- Commune
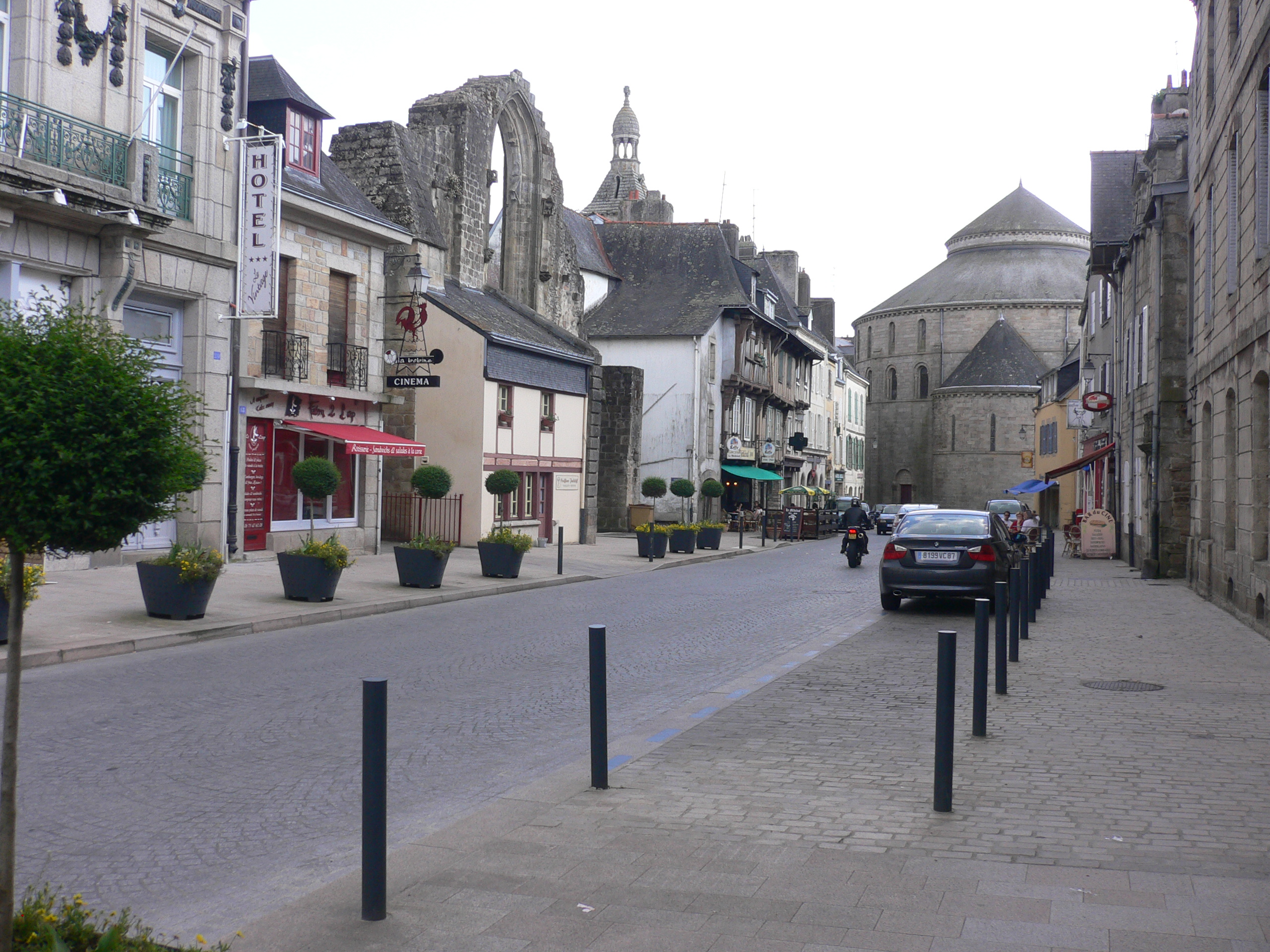
- Brémond d'Ars street

- Coat of arms
- Location of Quimperlé
- Location within France Location within Brittany
- Coordinates: 47°52′25″N 3°32′55″W
- Country: France
- Region: Brittany
- Department: Finistère
- Arrondissement: Quimper
- Canton: Quimperlé
- Intercommunality: CA Quimperlé Communauté

Government
  - Mayor (2020–2026): Michaël Quernez
- Area^{1}: 31.73 km^{2} (12.25 sq mi)
- Highest elevation: 83 m (272 ft)
- Lowest elevation: 2 m (6.6 ft)
- Population (2023): 12,469
  - Density: 393.0/km^{2} (1,018/sq mi)
- Time zone: UTC+01:00 (CET)
  - Summer (DST): UTC+02:00 (CEST)
- INSEE/Postal code: 29233 /29300
- ^{1} French Land Register data, which excludes lakes, ponds, glaciers > 1 km^{2} (0.386 sq mi or 247 acres) and river estuaries.

Quimperlé (French pronunciation: [kɛ̃pɛʁle]; Breton: Kemperle) is a commune in the Finistère department, region of Brittany, northwestern France.

== Geography ==
Quimperlé is in the southeast of Finistère, 20 km to the west of Lorient and 44 km to the east of Quimper. Historically, it belongs to Cornouaille. The town is situated at the confluence of the Isole and Ellé rivers that combine to form the Laïta river, hence its name: confluent (kemper-) of the Ellé (-le). A fourth smaller river, the Dourdu (black water in Breton), joins the Laïta downstream. Quimperlé station has rail connections to Quimper, Lorient, Vannes and Rennes.

The city is traditionally divided in two parts, the High Town and the Lower Town. The Lower Town, in the valley, is the historical centre, and developed around the Saint-Colomban church (of which only the front wall remains) and the abbey of Sainte Croix (Holy Cross). It covers the land between the Ellé and Isole rivers as well as the banks of the Laïta, an area that is sometimes flooded.

The more modern High Town, in the plain above the valley, centres around the Saint-Michel church and its market square. Seen from the Lower Town, its "mountain" topped with the Saint-Michel church has earned Quimperlé the nickname of "Mount Saint Michel on land"

The town also developed, less importantly, on the East side of the valley, facing the Saint Michel mountain. This area is called Bourgneuf, a common name for recent neighbourhoods.

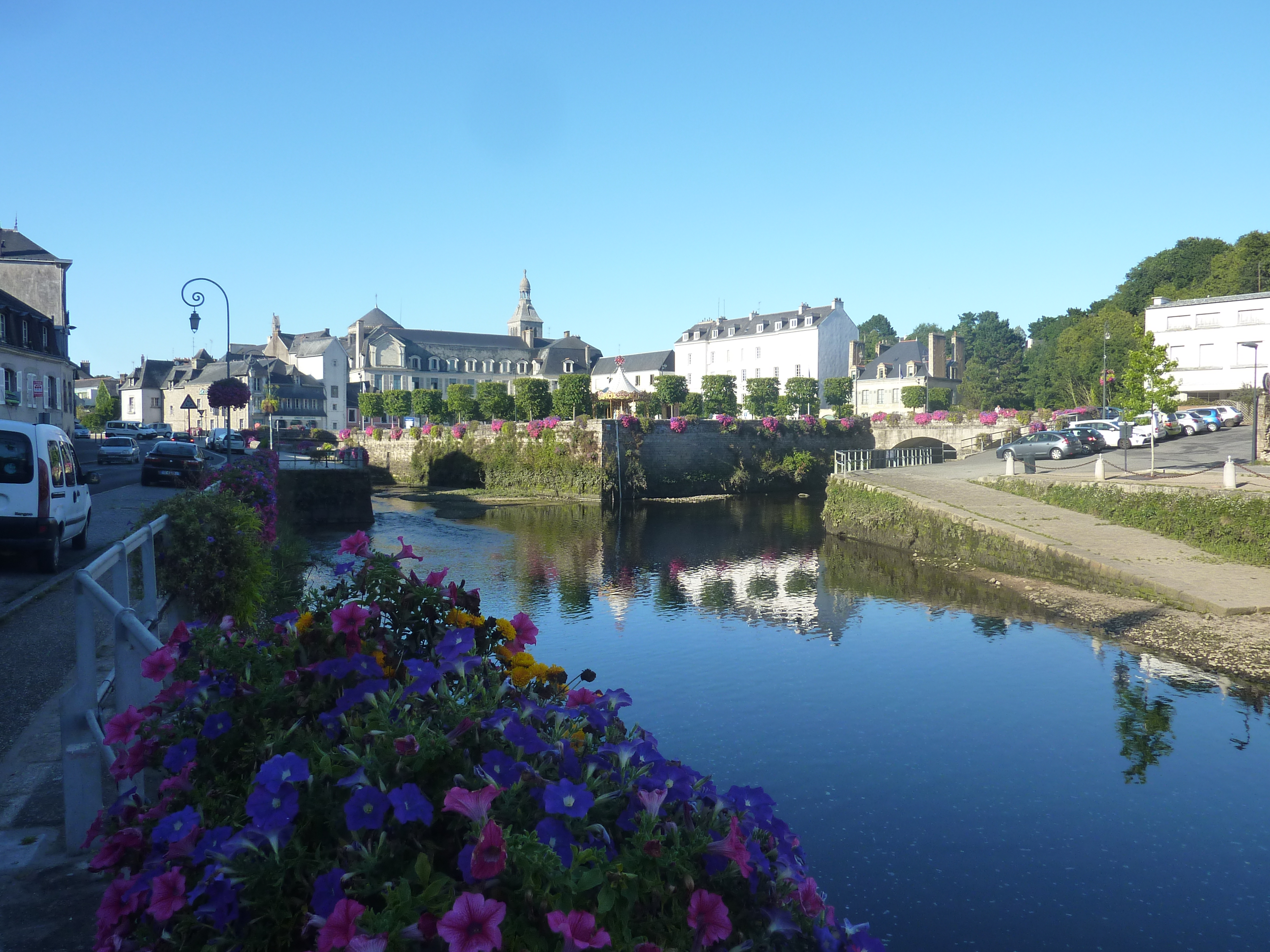
Confluence of the Isole and Ellé rivers in Quimperlé.

== Map ==
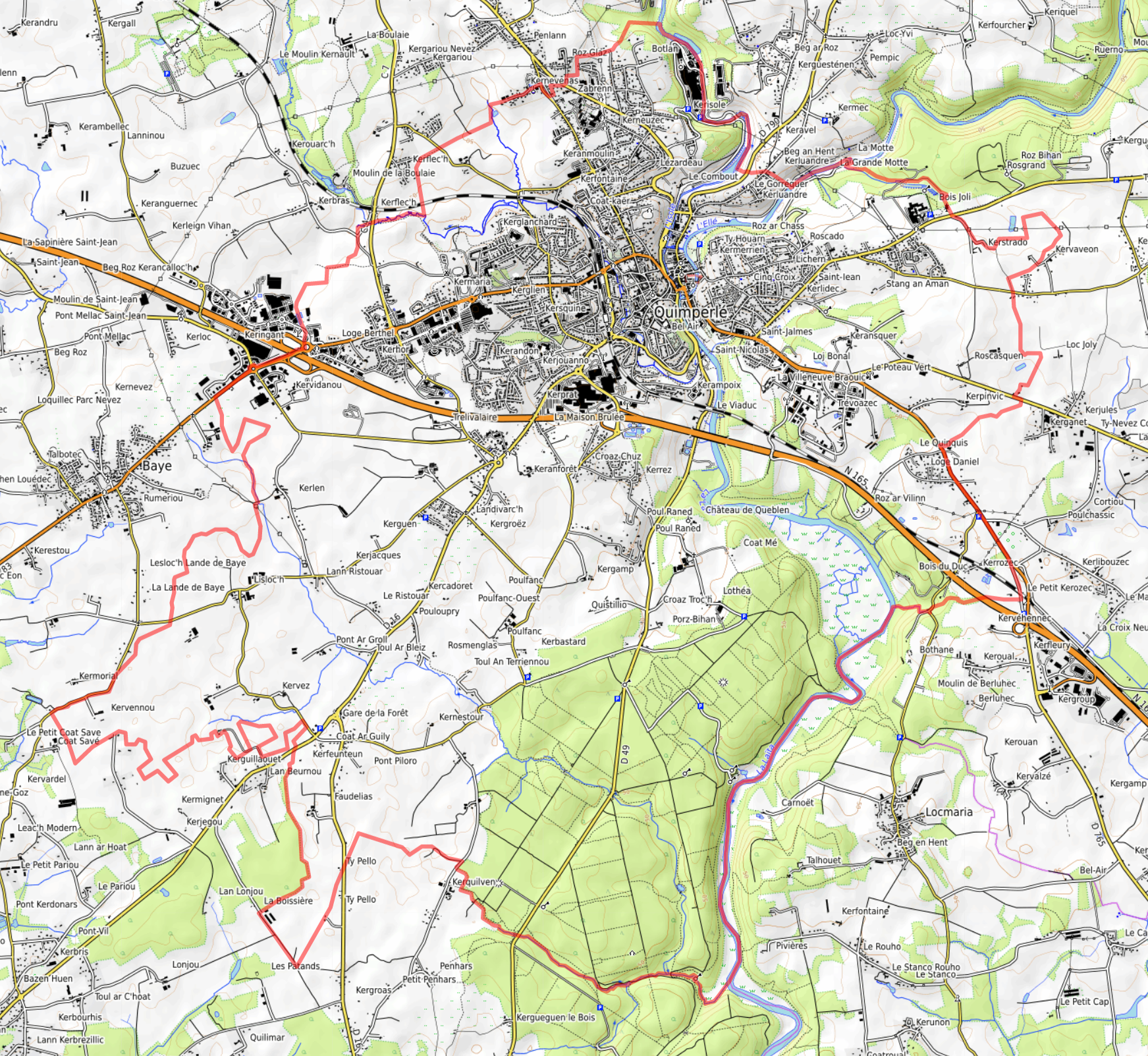
Topographic map

== Population ==
Inhabitants of Quimperlé are called in French Quimperlois.

Historical population

Year	Pop.	±% p.a.
1793	4,549	—
1800	5,617	+3.06%
1806	4,263	−4.49%
1821	4,724	+0.69%
1831	5,275	+1.11%
1836	5,541	+0.99%
1841	5,261	−1.03%
1846	5,791	+1.94%
1851	6,114	+1.09%
1856	6,375	+0.84%
1861	6,240	−0.43%
1866	6,863	+1.92%
1872	6,253	−1.54%
1876	6,533	+1.10%
1881	6,821	+0.87%
1886	7,156	+0.96%
1891	8,049	+2.38%
1896	8,306	+0.63%
1901	9,036	+1.70%

Year	Pop.	±% p.a.
1906	9,176	+0.31%
1911	9,188	+0.03%
1921	8,995	−0.21%
1926	8,969	−0.06%
1931	9,062	+0.21%
1936	9,335	+0.60%
1946	10,679	+1.35%
1954	10,030	−0.78%
1962	10,272	+0.30%
1968	10,698	+0.68%
1975	10,907	+0.28%
1982	11,067	+0.21%
1990	10,748	−0.36%
1999	10,850	+0.11%
2007	10,877	+0.03%
2012	12,052	+2.07%
2017	12,057	+0.01%
2023	12,469	+0.56%

Source: EHESS and INSEE (1968-2023)

== History ==
It seems that the area was first inhabited by Neanderthals, since remains of Mousterian-style stone tools have been found in the forest between Quimperlé and Clohars-Carnoët. A few dolmens were erected in Quimperlé itself, although there is no trace of an actual settlement in the prehistoric times.

A first settlement was built in the Middle Ages, called Villa Anaurot, after a 5th-century British prince, but it is thought to have been destroyed by the Normans in 868.

A new town called Quimperlé grew around the abbey of Sainte Croix, which was founded in the 12th century. The Romanesque basilica from the abbey can still be seen. The church of St Michel was built in the 14th and 15th centuries and its impressive tower dominates the town from its hilltop position.

== Breton language ==
- The municipality launched a linguistic plan concerning the Breton language through Ya d'ar brezhoneg on 18 December 2008.
- In 2008, 3.17% of primary-school children attended bilingual schools.

== Gallery ==
=== Old houses ===
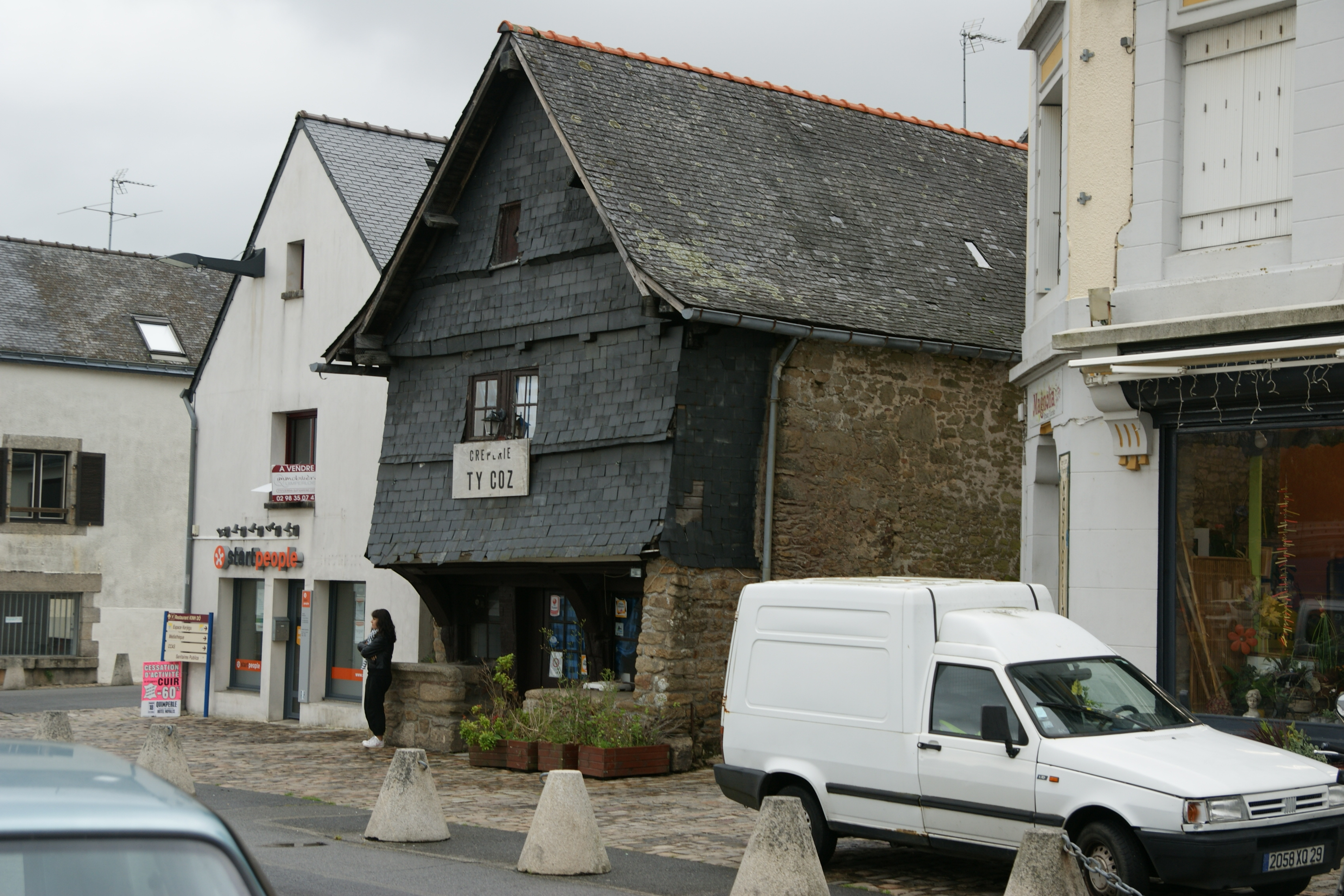
Old house called Ty Coz in place Saint Michel

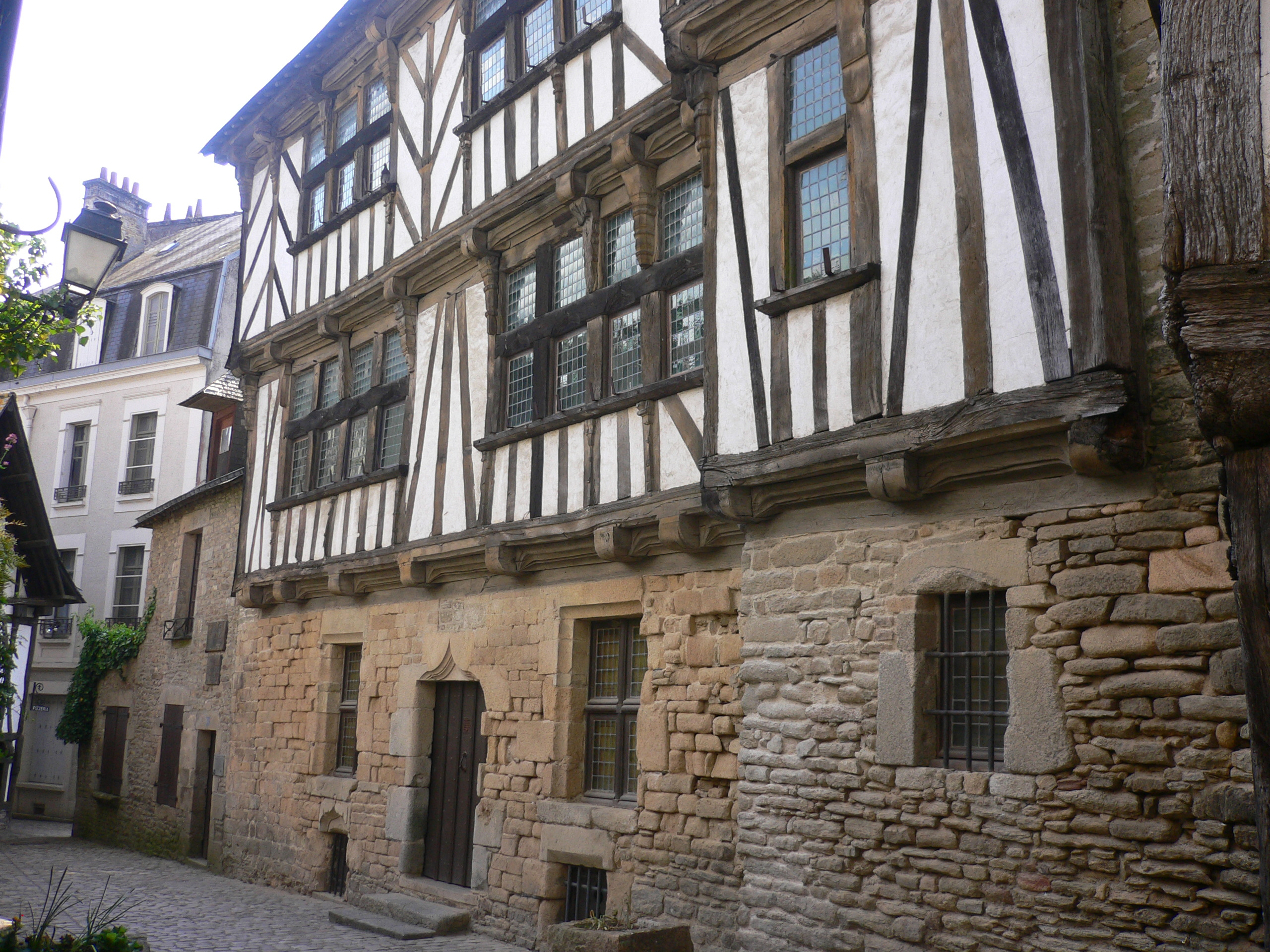
Timbered house called Maison des archers

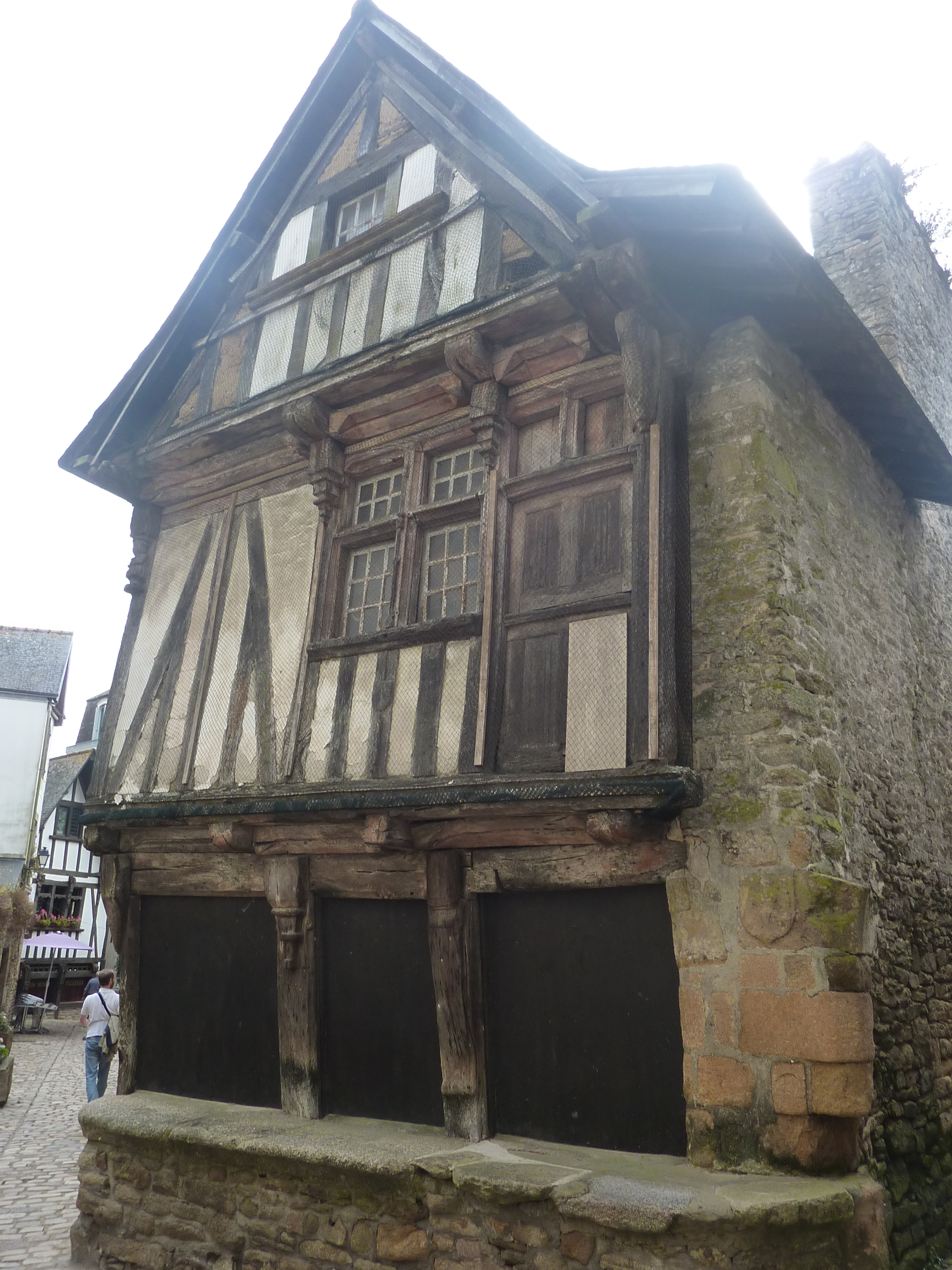
Timbered house in Street Dom Maurice

== See also ==
- Communes of the Finistère department
- Entry on sculptor Jean Joncourt who lived in Quimperlé
- List of works of the two Folgoët ateliers
- Henri Alphonse Barnoin
- Chapelle de Lothéa
