= Isole =

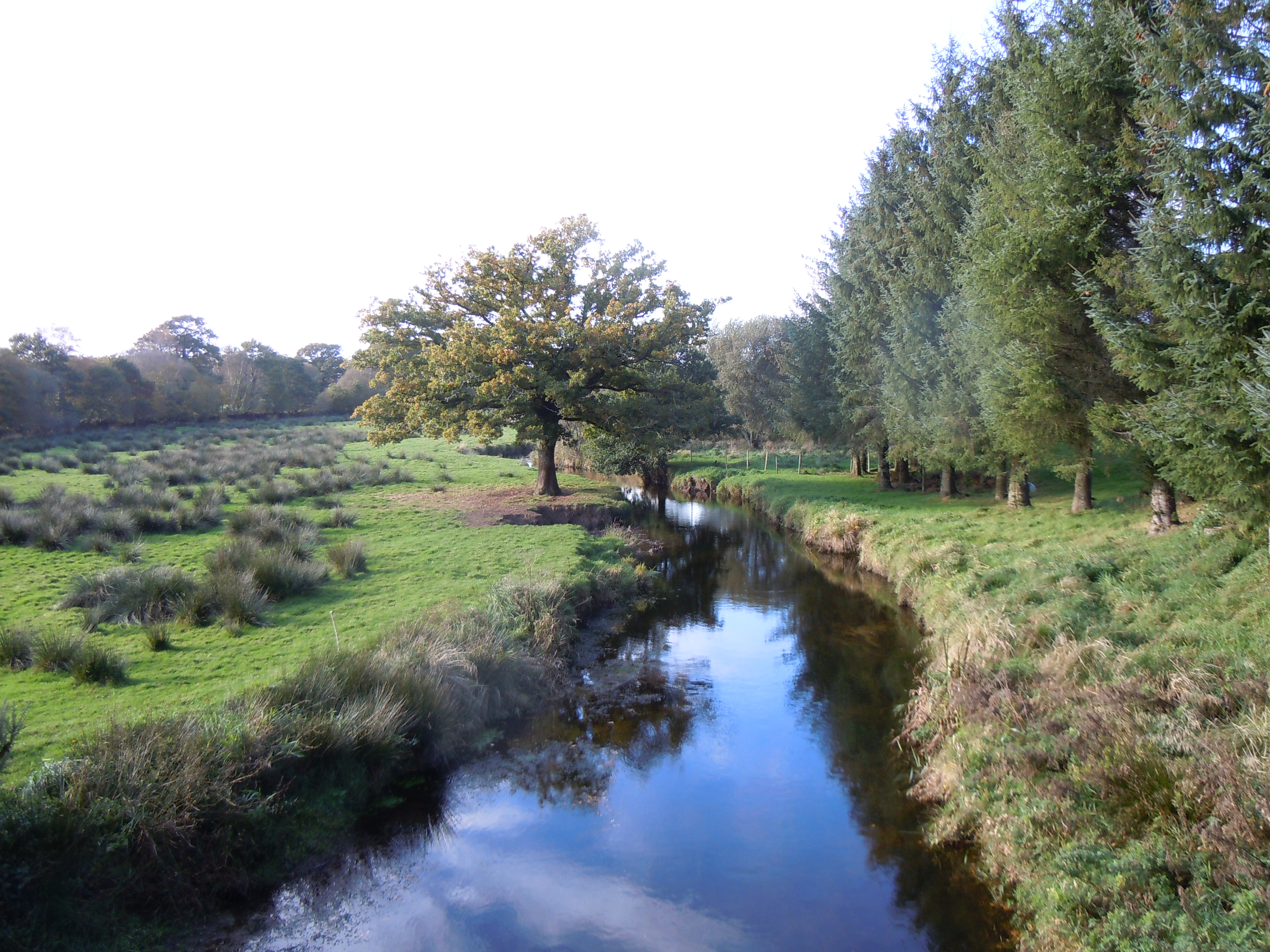
- Isole (at Scaër)

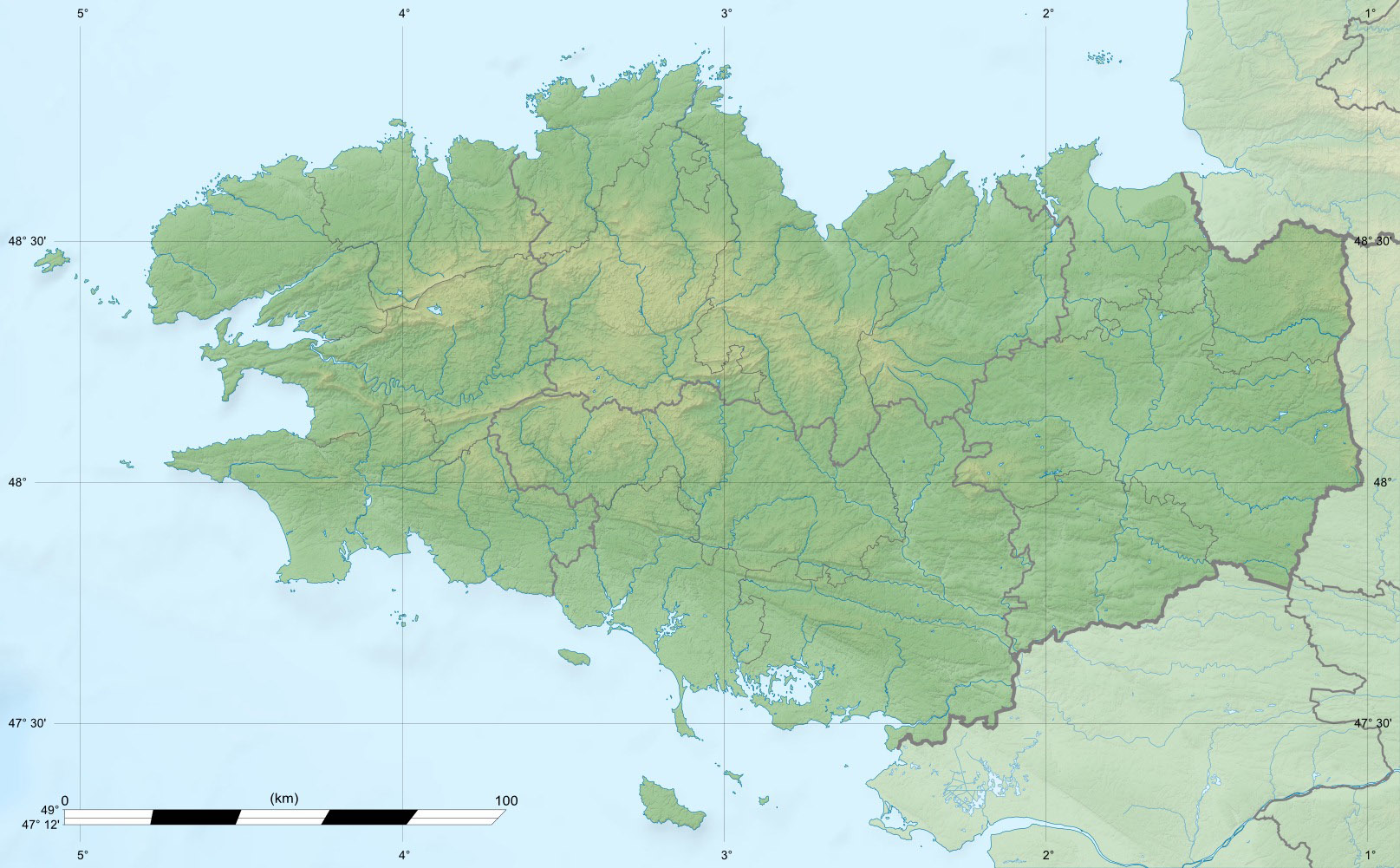
- Location within France Location within Brittany

Location
- Country: France

Physical characteristics
- Source
  - location: Brittany
- Mouth
  - location: Laïta
  - coordinates: 47°52′15″N 3°32′43″W
- Length: 48 km (30 mi)

Basin features
- Progression: Laïta→ Atlantic Ocean

Isole (Breton: Izol) is a river which flows through the department of Finistère in the region of Brittany in France. It is 48.2 km (30.0 mi) long and its basin area is 227 km^{2} (88 sq mi). Its source is near Roudouallec. Another town on the Isole is Scaër. At the town of Quimperlé it is joined by the Ellé to form the Laïta, which flows into the Atlantic Ocean at Le Pouldu.
