= Ellé =

River in France

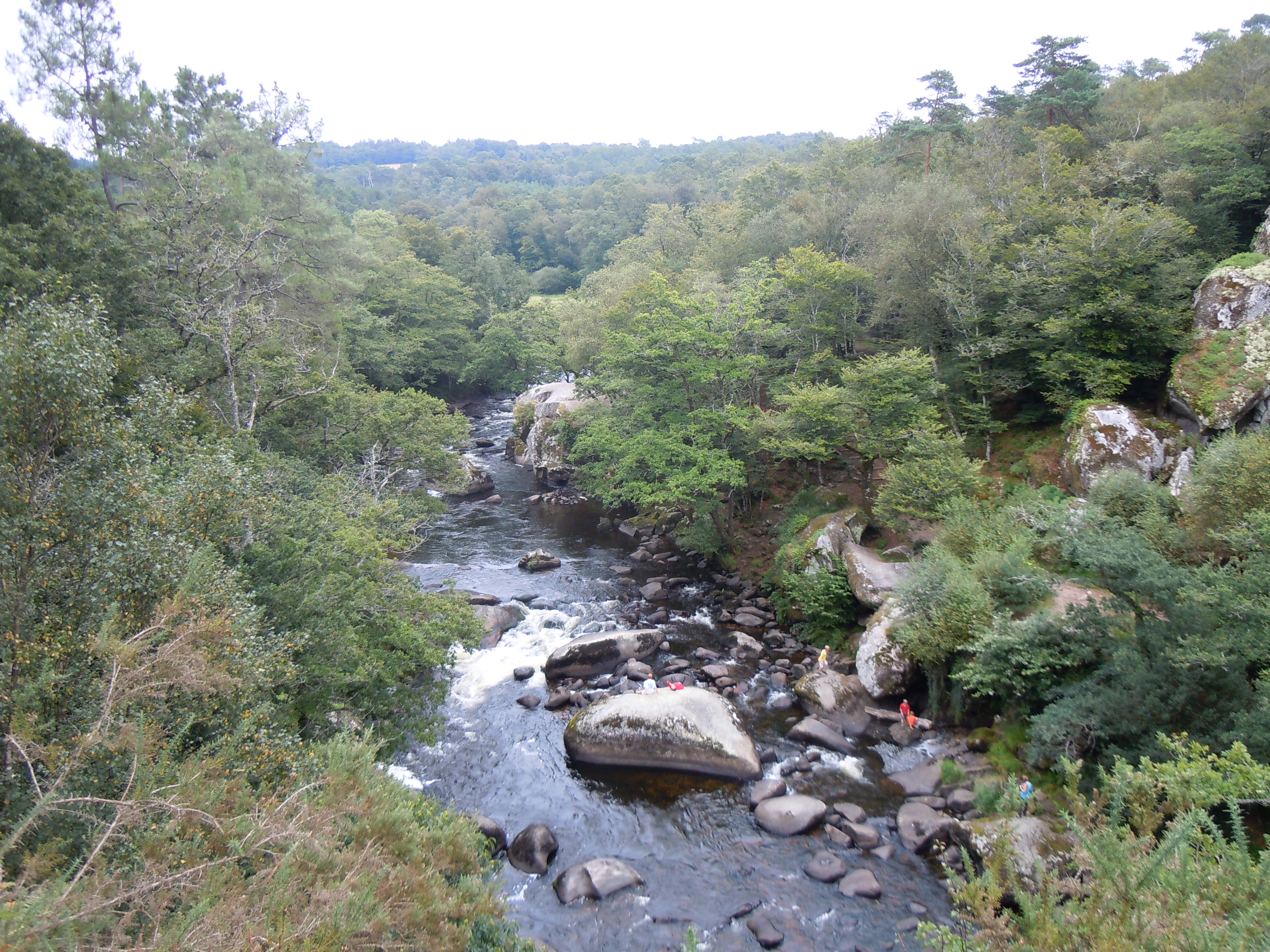

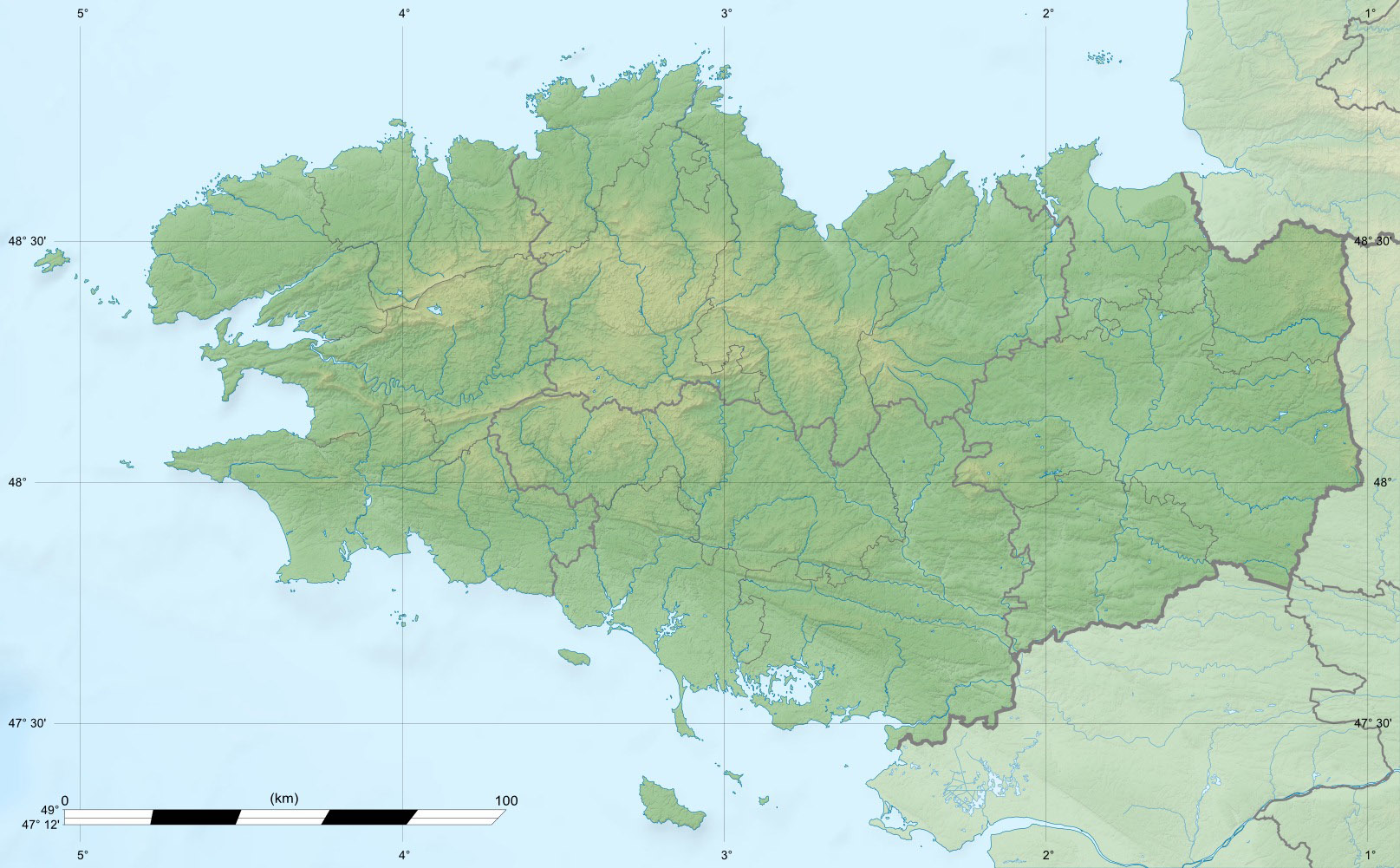
- Location within France Location within Brittany

Location
- Country: France

Physical characteristics
- Source
  - location: Brittany
- Mouth
  - location: Laïta
  - coordinates: 47°52′15″N 3°32′43″W
- Length: 59 km (37 mi)

Basin features
- Progression: Laïta→ Atlantic Ocean

The Ellé (French pronunciation: [ɛle]; Breton: Ele) is a river in the region of Brittany, western France. Its source is south of the town Rostrenen, in the south-west of the department Côtes-d'Armor. The Ellé flows southwest through the following départements and towns:

- Côtes-d'Armor
- Morbihan: Le Faouët
- Finistère: Quimperlé

At the town of Quimperlé it is joined by the Isole to form the Laïta that flows into the Atlantic Ocean at Le Pouldu. Combined with the Laïta, the river is 76 km (47 mi) long.
