= Clohars-Carnoët =

Clohars-Carnoët Kloar-Karnoed
- Commune
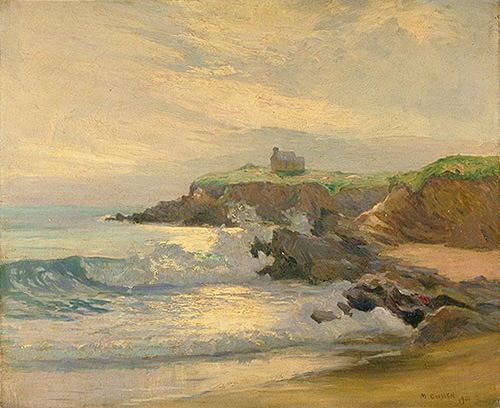
- Le Pouldu, Clohars-Carnoët

- Coat of arms
- Location of Clohars-Carnoët
- Location within France Location within Brittany
- Coordinates: 47°47′48″N 3°35′01″W
- Country: France
- Region: Brittany
- Department: Finistère
- Arrondissement: Quimper
- Canton: Quimperlé
- Intercommunality: CA Quimperlé Communauté

Government
  - Mayor (2020–2026): Jacques Juloux
- Area^{1}: 34.83 km^{2} (13.45 sq mi)
- Highest elevation: 71 m (233 ft)
- Lowest elevation: 0 m (0 ft)
- Population (2023): 4,708
  - Density: 135.2/km^{2} (350.1/sq mi)
- Time zone: UTC+01:00 (CET)
  - Summer (DST): UTC+02:00 (CEST)
- INSEE/Postal code: 29031 /29360
- ^{1} French Land Register data, which excludes lakes, ponds, glaciers > 1 km^{2} (0.386 sq mi or 247 acres) and river estuaries.

Clohars-Carnoët (French pronunciation: [klɔaʁ kaʁnwεt]; Breton: Kloar-Karnoed) is a commune in the Finistère department of Brittany in north-western France. The beach resort of Le Pouldu, with the beaches of Bellangenet and Kerrou, is located in the town.

== Geography ==
The commune has two small harbours: Le Pouldu and Doëlan. The Carnoët forest extends partly over the north of the commune. Historically, the village belongs to Cornouaille. The mouth of the river Ellé, called Laïta, forms a natural boundary to the east.

== Population ==
Inhabitants of Clohars-Carnoët are called in French Cloharsiens.

Historical population

Year	Pop.	±% p.a.
1793	2,469	—
1800	2,532	+0.36%
1806	2,353	−1.21%
1821	2,725	+0.98%
1831	2,795	+0.25%
1836	2,830	+0.25%
1841	2,850	+0.14%
1846	3,146	+2.00%
1851	3,332	+1.16%
1856	3,072	−1.61%
1861	3,125	+0.34%
1866	3,466	+2.09%
1872	3,389	−0.37%
1876	3,480	+0.66%
1881	3,572	+0.52%
1886	3,623	+0.28%
1891	3,717	+0.51%
1896	3,771	+0.29%
1901	4,010	+1.24%

Year	Pop.	±% p.a.
1906	4,355	+1.66%
1911	4,539	+0.83%
1921	4,474	−0.14%
1926	4,328	−0.66%
1931	4,287	−0.19%
1936	4,284	−0.01%
1946	4,226	−0.14%
1954	3,931	−0.90%
1962	3,919	−0.04%
1968	3,539	−1.69%
1975	3,284	−1.06%
1982	3,406	+0.52%
1990	3,678	+0.97%
1999	3,867	+0.56%
2007	3,971	+0.33%
2012	4,106	+0.67%
2017	4,333	+1.08%
2023	4,708	+1.39%

Source: EHESS and INSEE (1968–2023)

== Map ==
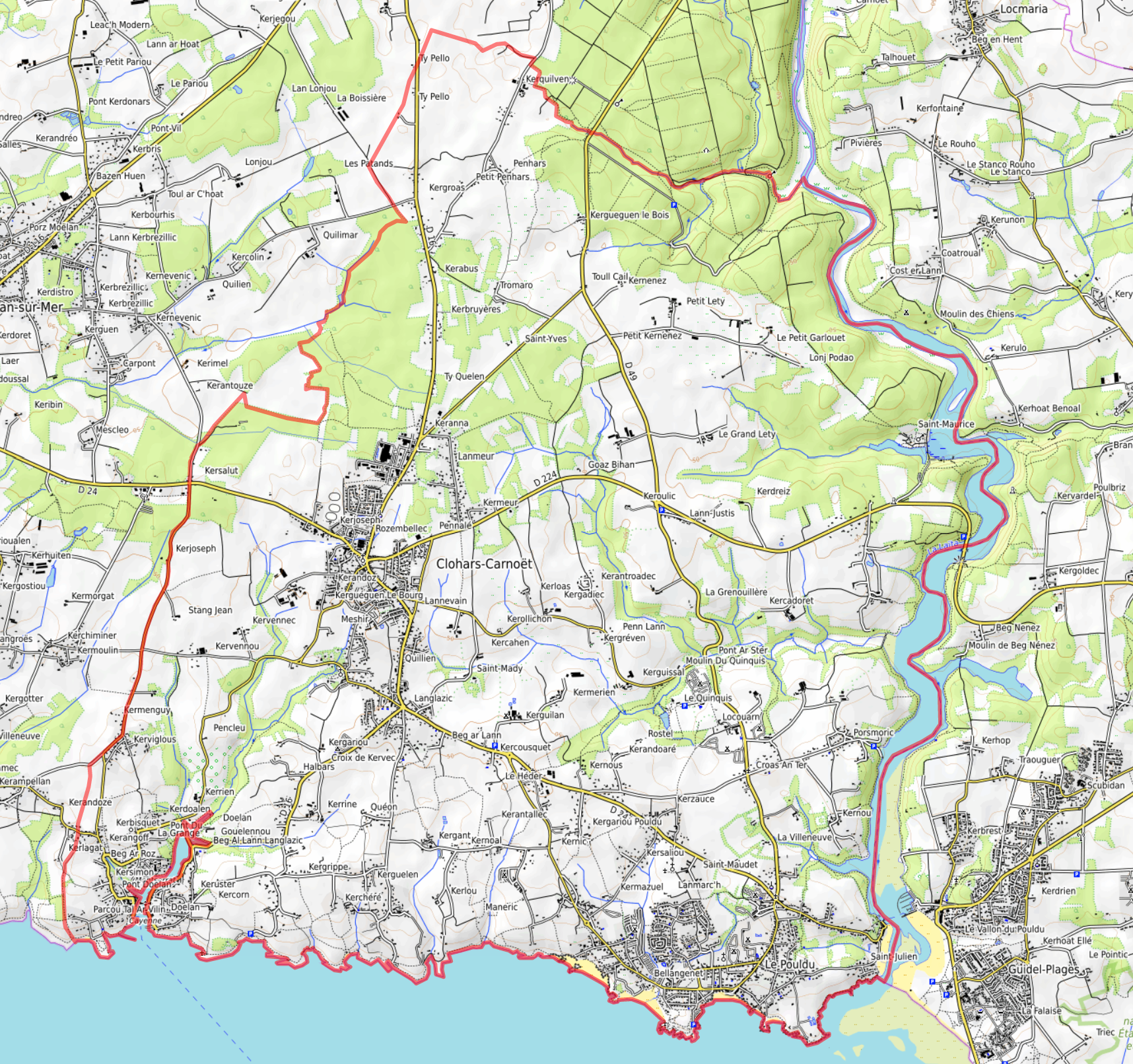
Topographic map

== Tourism ==
The beaches of Bellangenet and Kerrou, in the seaside resort of Le Pouldu, are popular destinations in Summer.

== See also ==
- Communes of the Finistère department
- Entry on sculptor of war memorial Jean Joncourt
- Yann Larhantec Sculptor at calvaries in Clohars-Carnoët
- It is the sister town of Dunmore East
