= Laïta =

River in France

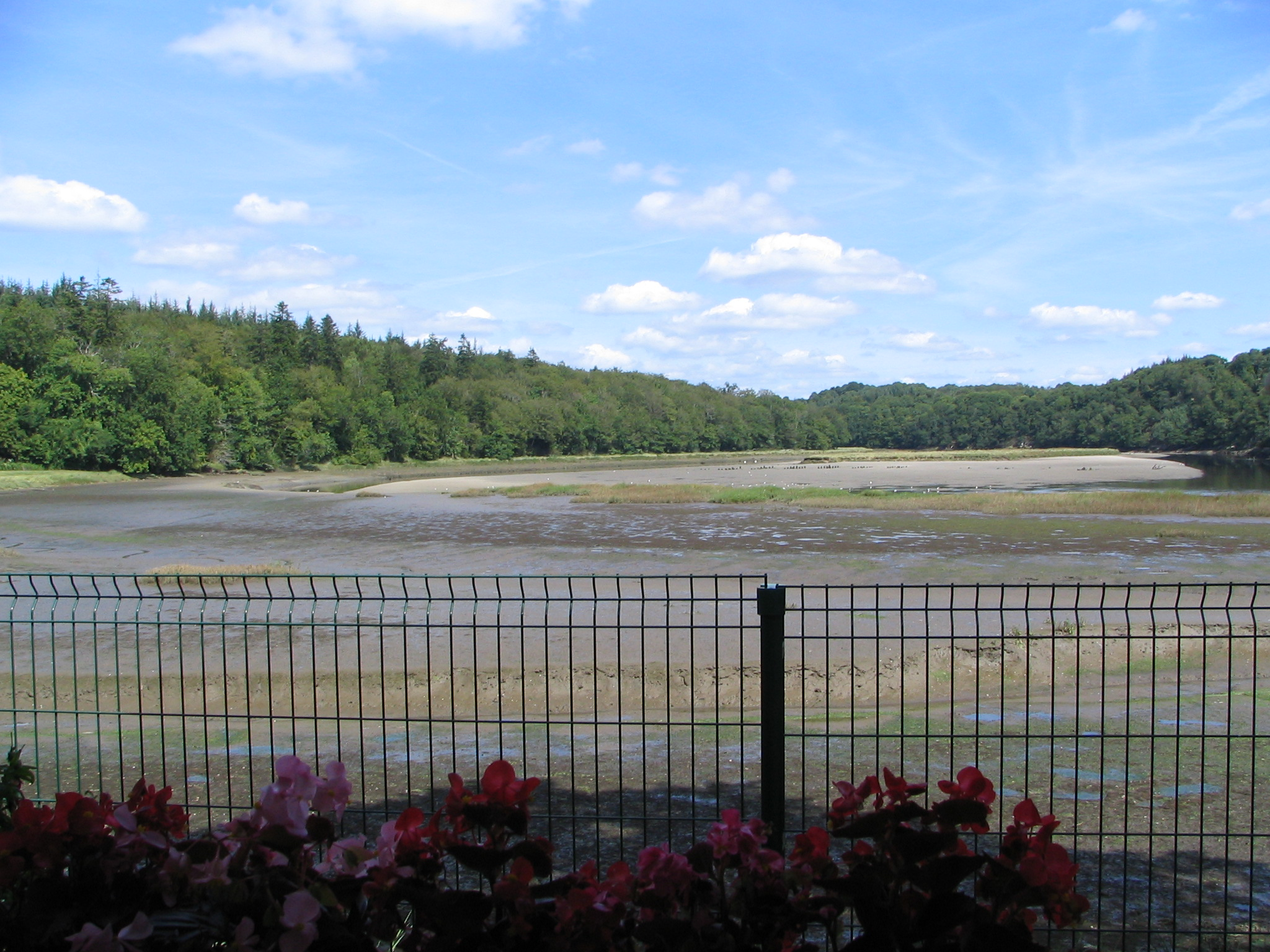

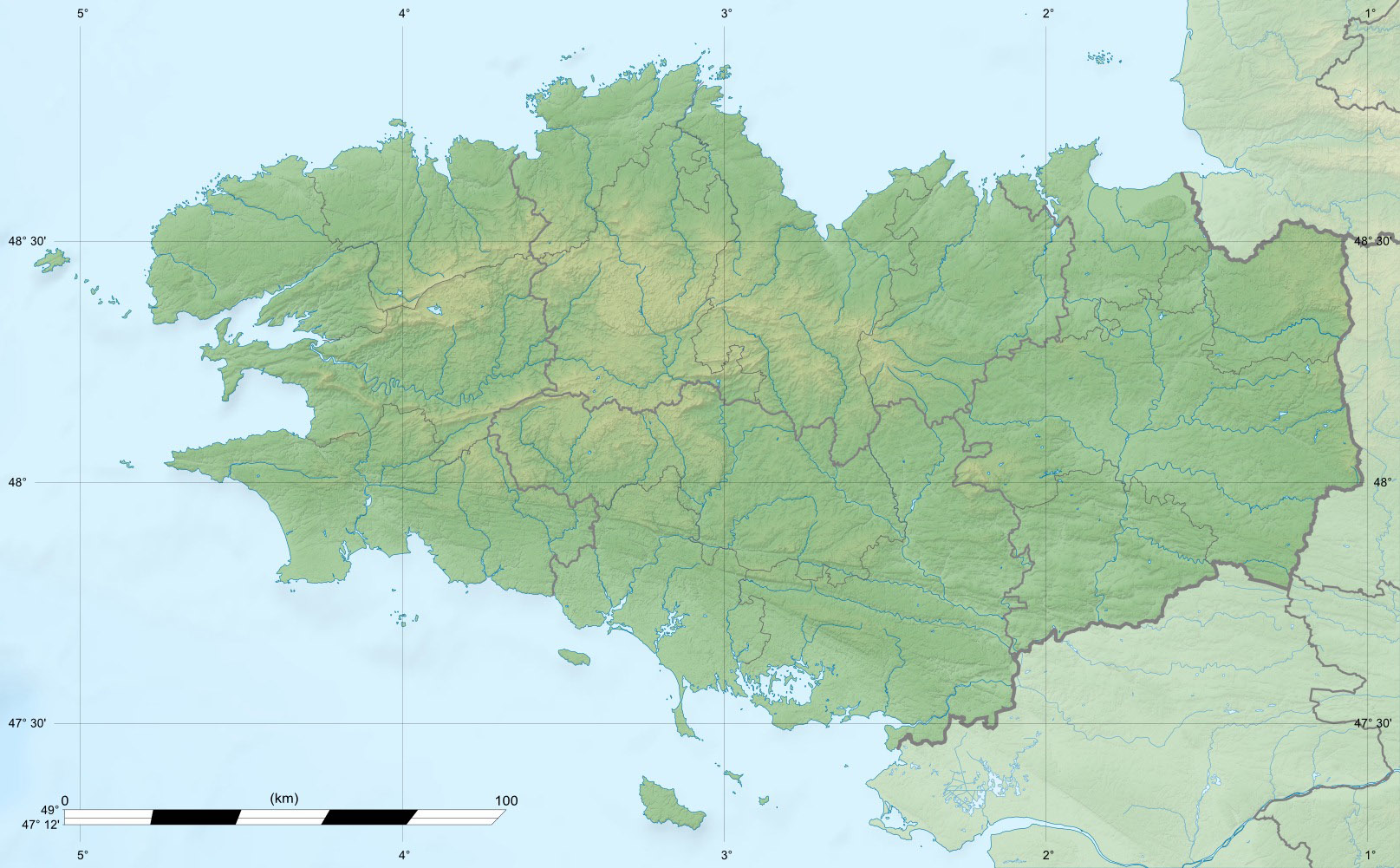

Location
- Country: France

Physical characteristics
- Source
  - location: Brittany
- Mouth
  - location: Atlantic Ocean
  - coordinates: 47°45′49″N 3°32′12″W
- Length: 17 km (11 mi)

The Laïta (Breton: Laeta) is a river in Brittany in northwestern France. It was the traditional border between the medieval realms or counties of Cornouaille and Gwened and now forms part of the border between the departments of Finistère and Morbihan. Properly speaking, it is formed at the confluence of the Ellé and Isole at Quimperlé, whence it flows into the Atlantic Ocean near Guidel. Informally, the Ellé is sometimes considered its upper course.
