= Georges Le Rider =

French librarian and professor (1928–2014)

- Born: Georges Charles Le Rider; 27 January 1928; Saint-Hernin (Finistère)
- Died: 3 July 2014 (aged 86); Givors (Rhône)
- Occupations: Historian; Librarian; Administrator

Academic work
- Discipline: History
- Institutions: Bibliothèque nationale de France
- Doctoral students: Soheir Bakhoum

Georges Charles Le Rider (27 January 1928 – 3 July 2014) was a French historian, librarian and administrator, a specialist in Greek numismatics, who headed the Bibliothèque nationale de France in Paris. He had a filial relationship with Henri Arnold Seyrig who became and remained his mentor.

== Career ==
After he was admitted to the École normale supérieure in 1948, Le Rider obtained his agrégation de lettres classiques in 1952. A member of the École française d'Athènes from 1952 to 1955, he joined the French Institute of Archeology of the Near East, where he stayed until 1958. While he was living in Athens, his son Jacques Le Rider was born; Jacques was to become a renowned Germanist. On his return from Beirut, Georges entered the Bibliothèque nationale de France as curator of the Cabinet des Médailles, a department he then headed from 1961. In 1975 he left the Cabinet des Médailles to become the deputy head of the Bibliothèque nationale, a position he held until his appointment in 1981 at the head of the Institut français d'études anatoliennes in Istanbul.

Concurrent with his work with these several institutions, he pursued a teaching career, first at the École pratique des hautes études, then at the University of Lille and at the university Paris-IV, before being elected professor of economic and monetary history of the Hellenistic East at the College de France in 1993. He retired in 1998.

He was elected a member of the Académie des Inscriptions et Belles-Lettres in 1989. In 1996, he was elected to the American Philosophical Society.

Le Rider was made a knight of the Ordre national de la Légion d'honneur in 1977 and promoted to the level of officier (officer) on 30 January 2008. He was also an officer of the Ordre national du Mérite and commandeur (Commander) of the Ordre des Palmes Académiques.

== Works ==
- 1965: Suse sous les Séleucides et les Parthes, les trouvailles monétaires et l’histoire de la ville, (thesis)
- 1966: Monnaies crétoises du Ve au Ier siècle av. J.-C., (complementary thesis)
- 1975: Code pour l’analyse des monnaies
- 1977: Le monnayage d’argent et d’or de Philippe II frappé en Macédoine de 359 à 294
- 1983: Catalogue de la collection Delepierre entrée au Cabinet des médailles en 1966, (in collaboration with H. Nicolet)
- 1988: Le Trésor de Meydancikkale (Cilicie-Trachée 1980), (in collaboration with A. Davesne)
- 1996: Monnayages et finances de Philippe II, un état de la question,
- 1997: Prix du blé et numéraire dans l’Égypte lagide de 305 à 173, (in collaboration with H. Cadell)
- 1998: Séleucie du Tigre, les monnaies séleucides et parthes
- 1999: Antioche de Syrie sous les Séleucides : corpus des monnaies d’or et d’argent. I, De Séleucos à Antiochos V, c. 300-161
- 2001: La naissance de la monnaie : pratiques monétaires de l'Orient ancien, Paris, PUF, series "Histoires".
- 2003: Alexandre Le Grand : monnaie, finances et politique
- 2006: Les Séleucides et les Ptolémées : l'héritage monétaire et financier d'Alexandre le Grand, (in collaboration with François de Callataÿ).

Preceded by Étienne Dennery	Administrateur général de la Bibliothèque nationale 1975–1981	Succeeded by Alain Gourdon
