= Soheir Bakhoum =

Egyptian-French numismatist

- Born: Alexandria, Egypt
- Died: June 19, 2003 (aged 56); Paris
- Occupation: Numismatist

Academic background
- Education: University of Alexandria; Paris-Sorbonne University
- Thesis: The Isiac Themes in Alexandria under the Antonines: Numismati and Historical Research (1986)
- Doctoral advisor: Georges Le Rider

Academic work
- Discipline: Classical archaeology
- Institutions: Greco-Roman Museum, Alexandria; French National Centre for Scientific Research
- Notable works: Sylloge Nummorum Graecorum France 4

Soheir Bakhoum, also Suhayr Salīm Bāẖūm (1 April 1947 – 19 June 2003) was an Egyptian-French numismatist, who specialised in Roman Alexandria. A festschrift dedicated to Bakhoum was published in 2008 and entitled Aegyptiaca serta in Soheir Bakhoum memoriam: mélanges de numismatique, d'iconographie et d'histoire.

== Biography ==
Born in Alexandria in 1947, Bakhoum was awarded her first PhD from Alexandria University in 1973, followed by a PhD in 1986 from Paris-Sorbonne University. A former curator of the Greco-Roman Museum in Alexandria, where she worked from 1970 to 1974, Bakhoum joined the French National Centre for Scientific Research in 1989. Her 1999 work on the Antonine period in Alexandria, was described by Francois Planet as "ce livre est simple et accessible. L'auteur a procédé avec méthode et employé les meilleurs outils pour nous offrir l'accès à ce dossier complexe [...this book is simple and accessible. The author has proceeded methodically and used the best tools to give us access to this complex area]". As editor of the Sylloge Nummorum Graecorum, volume 4 on the coinage of Alexandria from the reigns of Augustus to Trajan, her work was described by William E. Metcalf as bringing "the coinage of imperial Egypt to a level of accessibility consistent with its importance", although a review by Erik Christiansen was less favourable, citing mistakes in identification. Georges Le Rider described the volume as "bien fait [well done]" with explicit descriptions, and he hoped this volume would be followed by others fully describing the collection.

Bakhoum died in Paris in 2003, after a long illness.

== Legacy ==
A festschrift dedicated to Bakhoum was published in 2008 and entitled Aegyptiaca serta in Soheir Bakhoum memoriam: mélanges de numismatique, d'iconographie et d'histoire. Reviewed by Paul Edmund Stanwick, he described how the book "is a fitting recognition ... in that it both acknowledges and extends her work". Arnaud Suspène agreed with Stanwick, describing the work as paying tribute to an endearing colleague.

== Selected works ==
- Soheir Bakhoum, 'Dieux égyptiens à Alexandrie sous les Antonins. Recherches numismatiques et historiques.', Revue numismatique, Series 6 - Volume 157 (2001)
- Soheir Bakhoum, Sylloge Nummorum Graecorum France 4. Department des Monnaies, Medailles et Antiques. Alexandrie I. Auguste - Trajan. (1998)
