= Plourac'h =

Plourac'h Plourac'h
- Commune
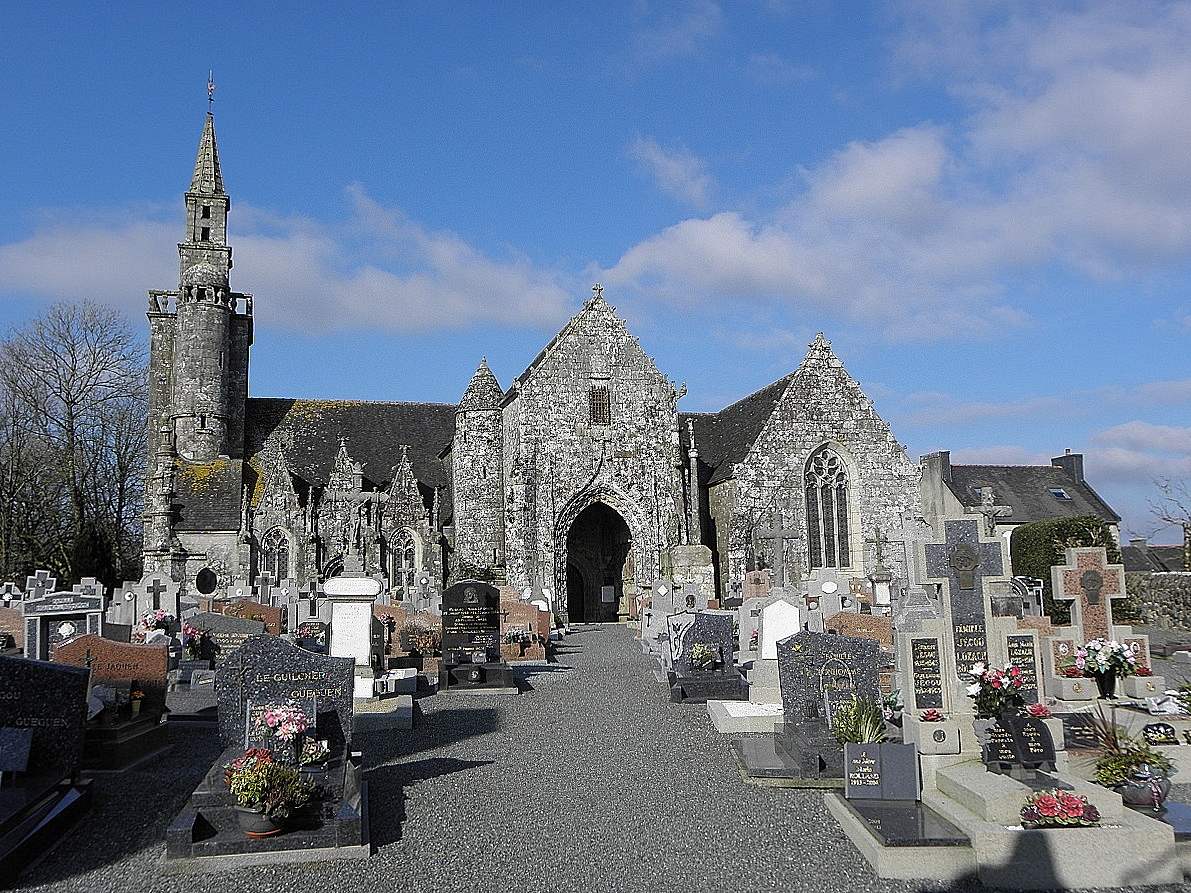
- The church of Notre-Dame, in Plourac'h

- Coat of arms
- Location of Plourac'h
- Location within France Location within Brittany
- Coordinates: 48°25′01″N 3°32′45″W
- Country: France
- Region: Brittany
- Department: Côtes-d'Armor
- Arrondissement: Guingamp
- Canton: Callac
- Intercommunality: Guingamp-Paimpol Agglomération

Government
  - Mayor (2020–2026): Yannick Larvor
- Area^{1}: 32.15 km^{2} (12.41 sq mi)
- Highest elevation: 284 m (932 ft)
- Lowest elevation: 125 m (410 ft)
- Population (2023): 351
  - Density: 10.9/km^{2} (28.3/sq mi)
- Time zone: UTC+01:00 (CET)
  - Summer (DST): UTC+02:00 (CEST)
- INSEE/Postal code: 22231 /22160
- ^{1} French Land Register data, which excludes lakes, ponds, glaciers > 1 km^{2} (0.386 sq mi or 247 acres) and river estuaries.

Plourac'h (Breton: Plourac'h) is a commune in the Côtes-d'Armor department of Brittany in northwestern France.

== Population ==
Historical population
Year	Pop.	±% p.a.
1968	742	—
1975	592	−3.17%
1982	513	−2.03%
1990	437	−1.98%
1999	370	−1.83%
2007	354	−0.55%
2012	342	−0.69%
2017	319	−1.38%
2023	351	+1.61%
Source: INSEE

Inhabitants of Plourac'h are called plouracois in French.

== See also ==
- Communes of the Côtes-d'Armor department
- List of works of the two Folgoët ateliers
- Listing of the works of the Maître de Laz
