= Briec =

Briec Brieg
- Commune
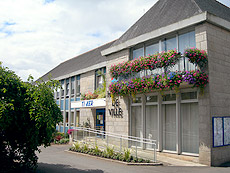
- Town hall

- Coat of arms
- Location of Briec
- Location within France Location within Brittany
- Coordinates: 48°06′10″N 3°59′50″W
- Country: France
- Region: Brittany
- Department: Finistère
- Arrondissement: Quimper
- Canton: Briec
- Intercommunality: Quimper Bretagne Occidentale

Government
  - Mayor (2020–2026): Thomas Férec
- Area^{1}: 67.87 km^{2} (26.20 sq mi)
- Highest elevation: 225 m (738 ft)
- Lowest elevation: 44 m (144 ft)
- Population (2023): 5,816
  - Density: 85.69/km^{2} (221.9/sq mi)
- Time zone: UTC+01:00 (CET)
  - Summer (DST): UTC+02:00 (CEST)
- INSEE/Postal code: 29020 /29510
- Website: Official website
- ^{1} French Land Register data, which excludes lakes, ponds, glaciers > 1 km^{2} (0.386 sq mi or 247 acres) and river estuaries.

Briec (French pronunciation: [bʁijɛk], formerly Briec-de-l'Odet; Breton: Brieg) is a commune in the Finistère department in the region of Brittany in north-western France.

== Sights ==
- Calvary at Saint-Vennec, (1556)
- Chapelle de la Madeleine, 16th century
- Chapelle de Sainte-Cécile 16th century
- Chapelle Notre-Dame d'Illijour 19th century
- Chapelle Saint-Corentin 16th century
- Chapelle Saint-Égarec 16th century
- Chapelle Saint-Sébastien 16th century
- Chapelle Saint-Venec 16th century
- Saint-Pierre parish church, 15th century

== List of mayors ==
- Jean-Hubert Pétillon 2014
- Jean-Paul Le Pann 2001/2014
- Joseph Bernard 1989/2001
- François Rolland 1981/1989
- Pierre Stephan 1959/1981
- Yves Le Page 1945/1959
- Jean Pennarun 1941/1945
- Hervé Merour 1929/1941
- Pierre Kerbourc'h 1925/1929
- Jean Pennarun 1919/1925
- Michel Croissant 1908/1919
- Jean Pennarun 1906/1908
- Michel Croissant 1904/1906
- Hervé Le Gac 1882/1904
- Pierre Dandurand 1878/1882
- Jean Bozec 1857/1878
- Jean Rolland 1855/1857
- Jean Kerbourch 1848/1855
- Hervé Le Berre 1827/1848
- François CreachcadicC 1806/1827
- Yves Le Gougay 1803/1806
- Jean Le Louet 1801/1803
- Le Hénaff 1796/1801
- Le Gougay 1794/1796
- François Ducap 1793/1794
- Yves Le Grand 01-1793/07-1793
- Henry Hémon 01-1792/01-1793
- Jean Pennanech 11-1791/12-1791

== International relations ==
Briec is twinned with:

- Ruthin, Wales, United Kingdom.

== Population ==
Inhabitants of Briec are called in French Briecois.

Historical population

Year	Pop.	±% p.a.
1793	4,106	—
1800	4,521	+1.38%
1806	3,495	−4.20%
1821	4,191	+1.22%
1831	4,481	+0.67%
1836	4,592	+0.49%
1841	5,149	+2.32%
1846	5,310	+0.62%
1851	5,493	+0.68%
1856	5,437	−0.20%
1861	5,493	+0.21%
1866	5,726	+0.83%
1872	5,592	−0.39%
1876	5,906	+1.38%
1881	5,875	−0.11%
1886	6,175	+1.00%
1891	6,413	+0.76%
1896	4,765	−5.77%
1901	4,067	−3.12%

Year	Pop.	±% p.a.
1906	4,403	+1.60%
1911	4,436	+0.15%
1921	4,367	−0.16%
1926	4,199	−0.78%
1931	3,935	−1.29%
1936	4,072	+0.69%
1946	3,848	−0.56%
1954	3,647	−0.67%
1962	3,425	−0.78%
1968	3,436	+0.05%
1975	3,744	+1.23%
1982	4,587	+2.94%
1990	4,546	−0.11%
1999	4,603	+0.14%
2007	5,174	+1.47%
2012	5,497	+1.22%
2017	5,630	+0.48%
2023	5,816	+0.54%

Source: EHESS and INSEE (1968-2023)

== Breton language ==
In 2008, 7.77% of primary-school children attended bilingual schools.

== See also ==
- Communes of the Finistère department
- The Briec monument aux morts has sculpture by Pierre Charles Lenoir
- Listing of the works of the Maître de Laz
