= Saint Hernin Parish close =

Coordinates: 48.2180°N 3.6346°W

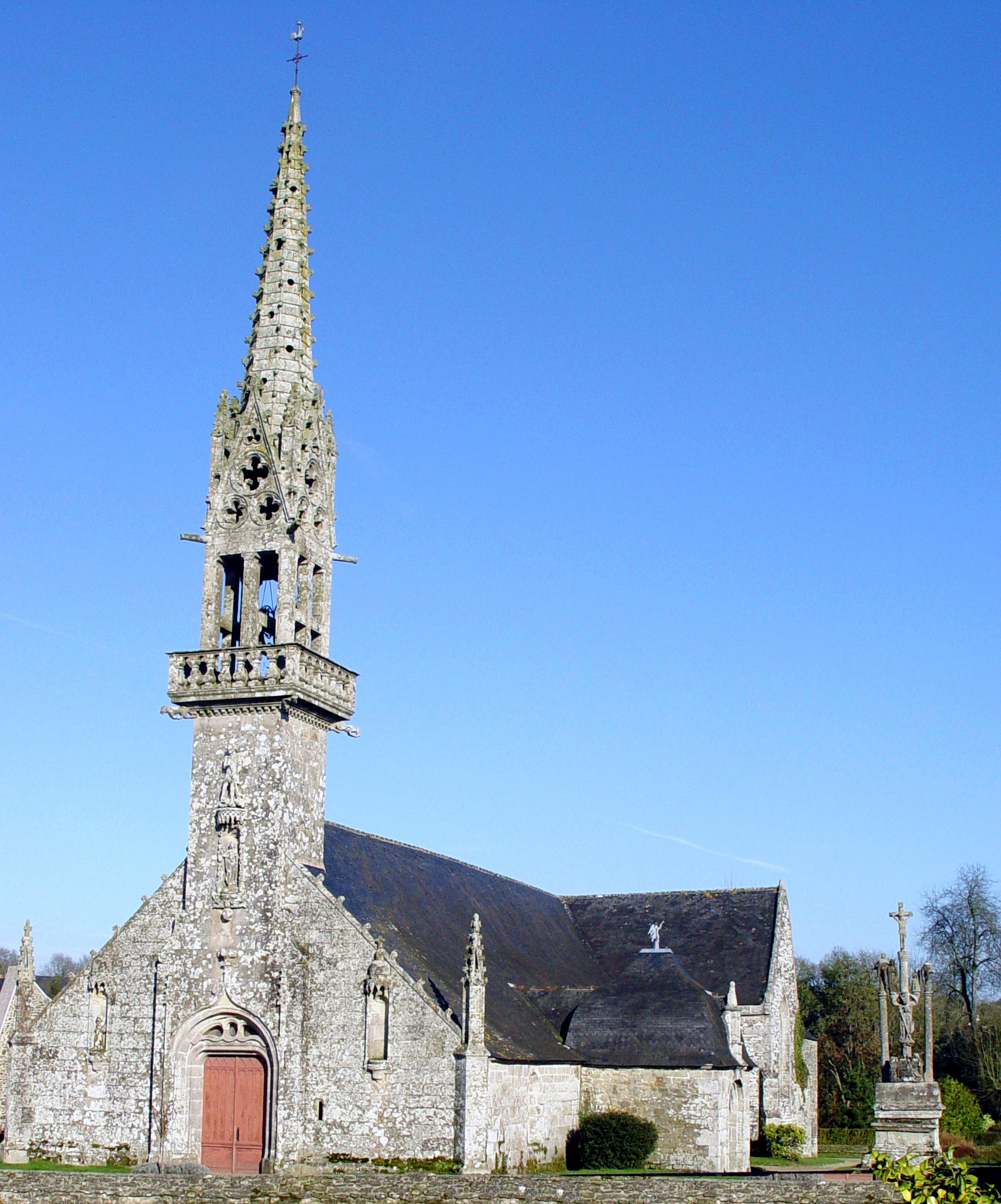
The church at Saint Hernin

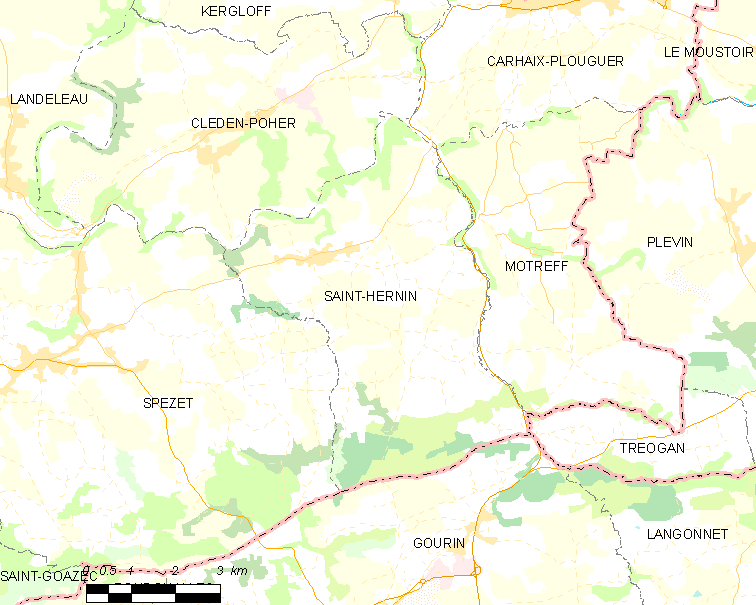
Map showing the location of Saint-Hernin

The Saint Hernin Parish close (Enclos paroissial) is located at Saint-Hernin in the Châteaulin arrondissement within Brittany in north-western France. The parish church was completed in 1682 and the enclos paroissial comprises the church, an ossuary and calvary. The south porch dates to 1632. Statuary in the church includes Saint Hernin, to whom the church is dedicated, Saint Corentin, Saint Michael, Saint Guénolé, Saint Catherine, John the Baptist, a pietà and Saint Peter. It is a listed historical monument since 1972.

== The calvary ==
The enclos paroissial calvary is 6 metres high and was erected in around 1530. It is thought to have been executed by the workshop who carved the calvary at Brasparts. The base incorporates an altar suggesting that the calvary was at one time used for open air services. The pedestal placed on this base is rectangular and from it emerge the crucifixion cross and two tau shaped gibbets, and at the base of these there is a 'Vierge de Pitié" or pietà carved from kersanton stone featuring the Virgin Mary supporting Jesus' body assisted by Mary Magdalene and John the Evangelist. On the central shaft bearing the crucifixion cross there is a relief carving of Saint Michael slaying the dragon and at the top of the shaft is an arrangement including depictions of three marmousets (small grotesque carvings) who support statues of the Virgin Mary (on the right) and John the Evangelist (on the left). Both these statues are in ronde bosse. The figure of Jesus is carved from granite and is in high relief whereas the good and bad robbers on the two side gibbets, their bodies contorted, were carved from kersanton stone.

== The ossuary ==
The ossuary dates to 1697 and was restored in 1965. It became the Saint Anne chapel once the use of ossuaries ceased. Decoration includes Saint Anne reading to the Virgin Mary.

== The calvary at Kerbreudeur ==
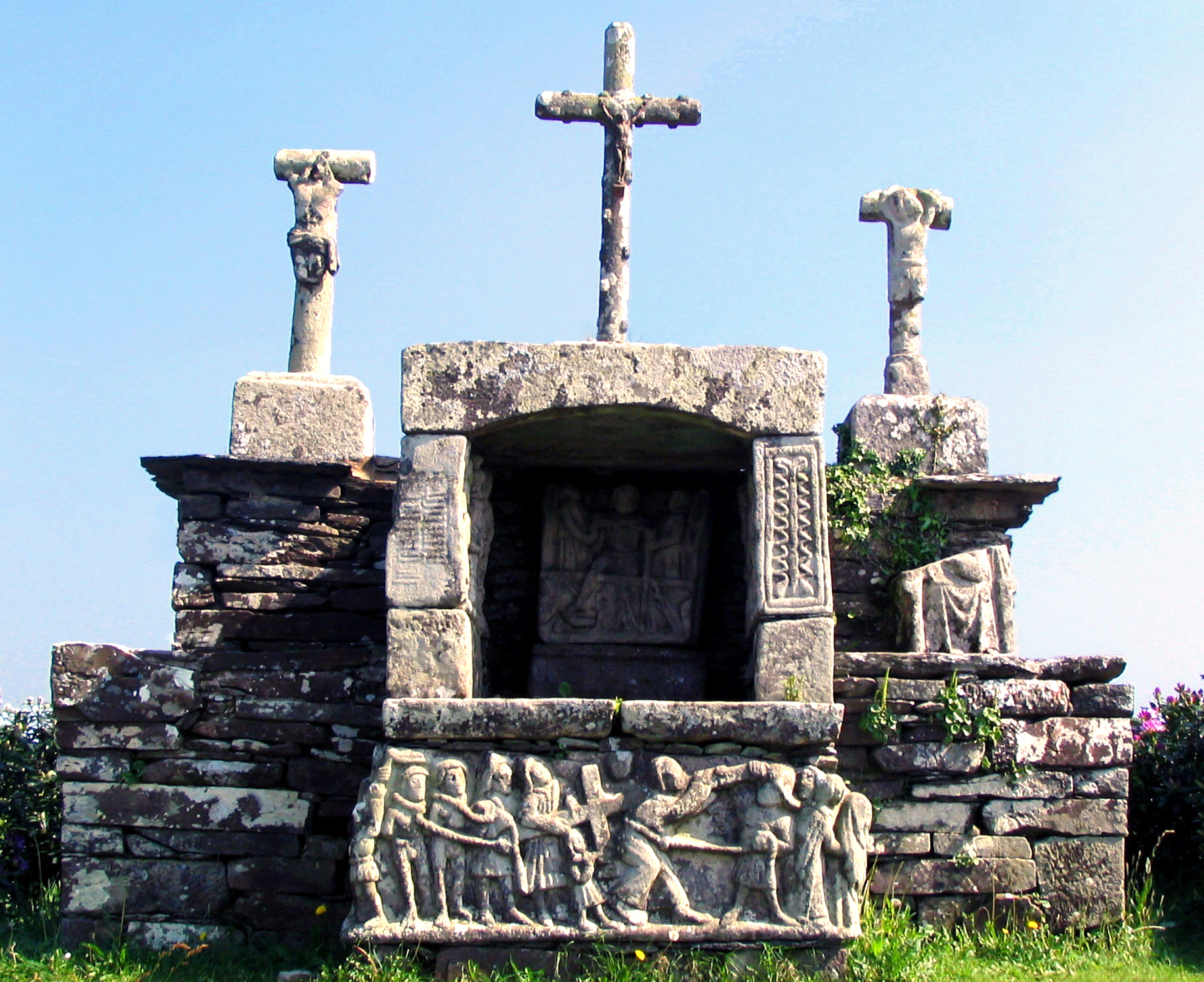
The Kerbreudeur calvary

Nearby Saint-Hernin is the remarkable Kerbreudeur calvary, built in around 1450 and reckoned to be the oldest calvary in western Brittany. It is carved from granite from Scaër. The Kerbredeur Calvary has been attributed to the "Atelier de Scaër", who were also responsible for the Tronoen calvary at Saint-Jean Trolimon. The calvary comprises a rectangular base formed into a large niche within which are several bas-relief panels. Outside of this niche is a relief showing Saint Michael slaying a dragon and Saint Catherine of Alexandria with her wheel and carrying a sword. She wears a crown. Also outside the niche is a relief depicting the nativity and the Adoration of the Magi and another depicts the mouth of hell. The bas-reliefs inside the niche include depictions of Jesus' baptism and his resurrection as well as a scene showing Adam and Eve being thrown out of the Garden of Eden. Also outside the niche there is a relief showing the procession where Jesus and the two robbers carry their crosses to Golgotha. The procession is led by the Virgin Mary and John the Evangelist. Jesus is helped by Simon of Cyrene. There is also a depiction of the flagellation. Above the roof of the niche are the crucifixion cross and the gibbets of the good and bad robber on cube-shaped pedestals. On the face of the base facing northwest there is a sculpture depicting God on a throne, surrounded by angels The following are photographs of the bas-reliefs.

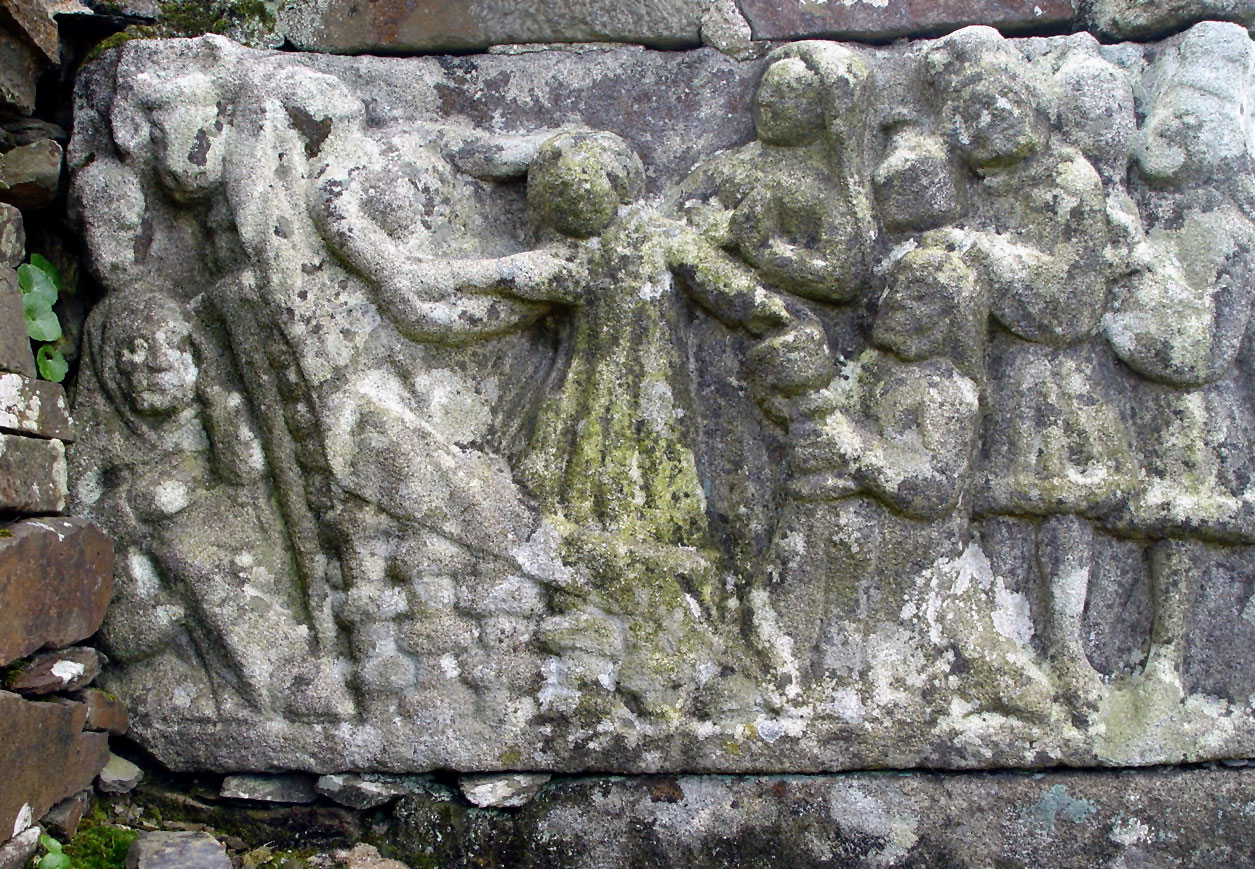
Adoration of the Magi: Mary lies on a bed with Jesus at her side. One of the Magi hands Jesus a chalice.

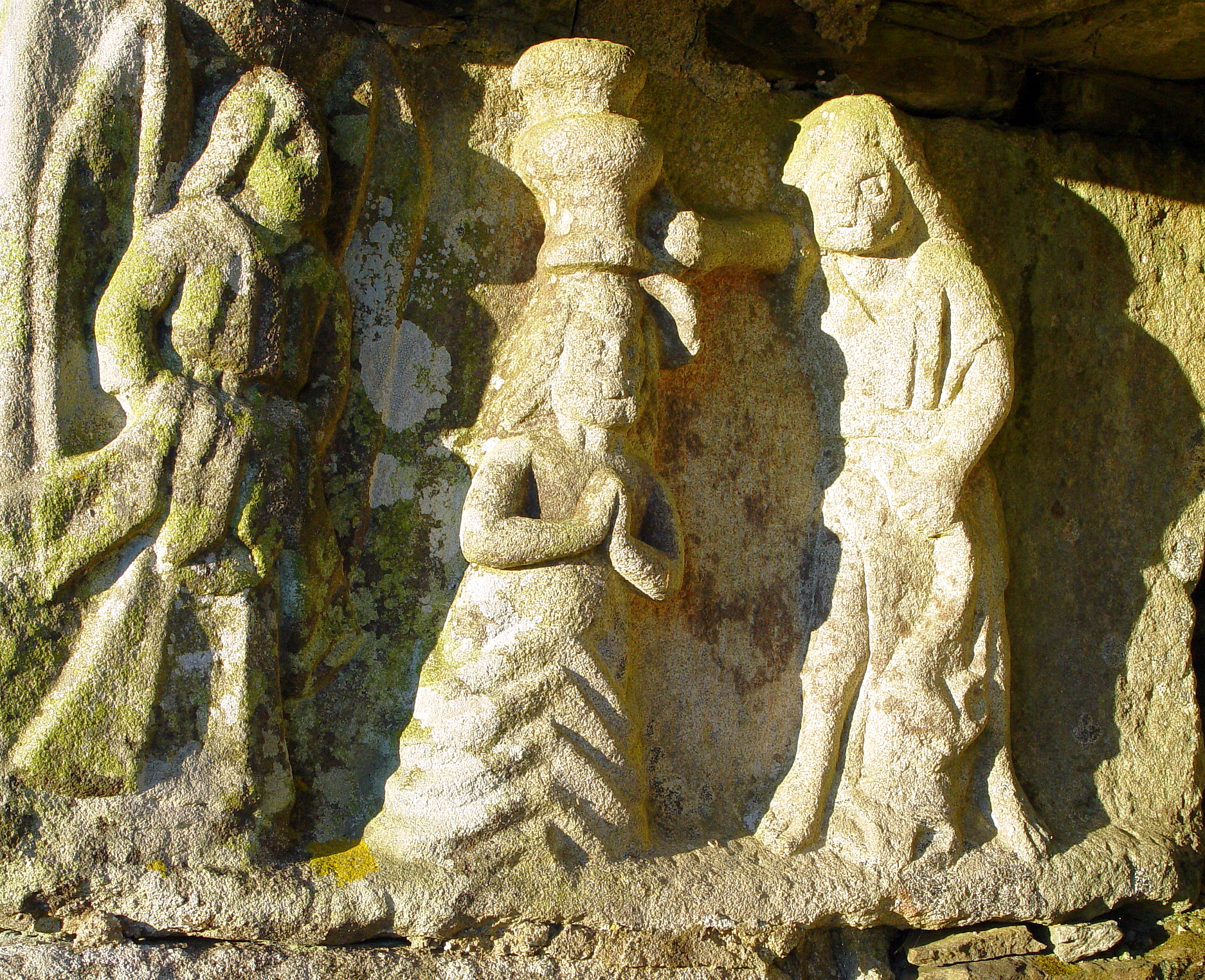
Baptism of Jesus by John who pours water while angel holds Jesus' cloak.

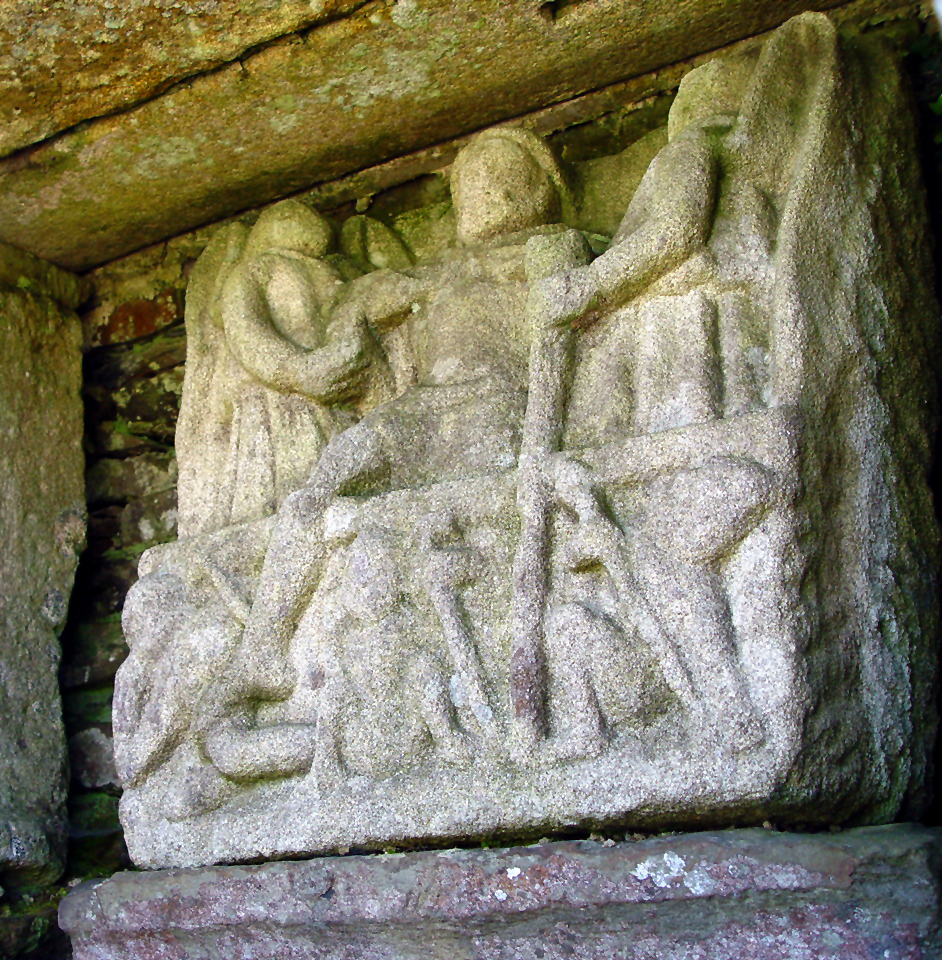
The resurrection. Jesus emerges from his tomb assisted by two angels.

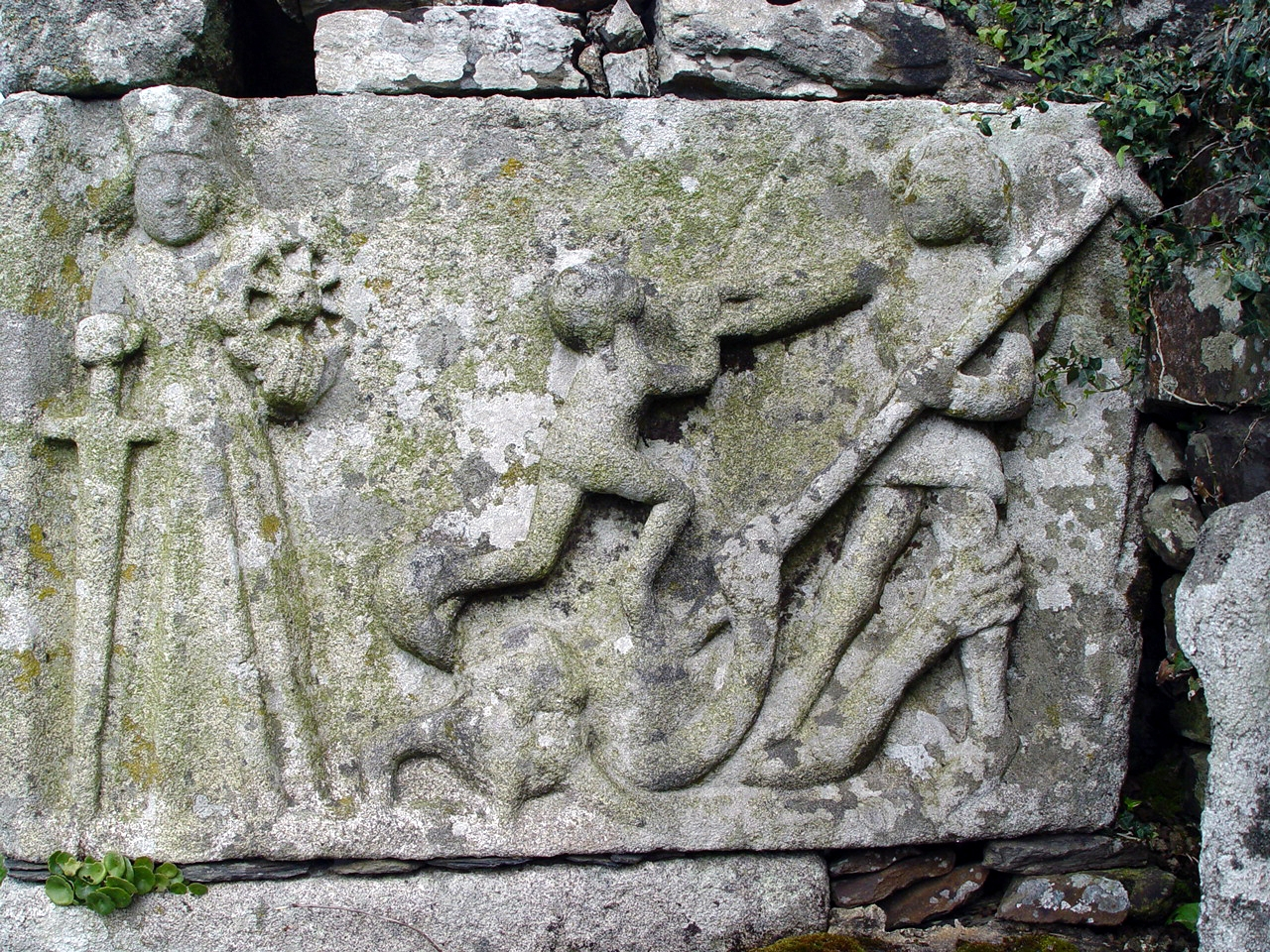
Saint Michael slays the dragon-devil, with 4 hands and horns. On left, Catherine of Alexandria with sword, crown, and wheel of martyrdom.

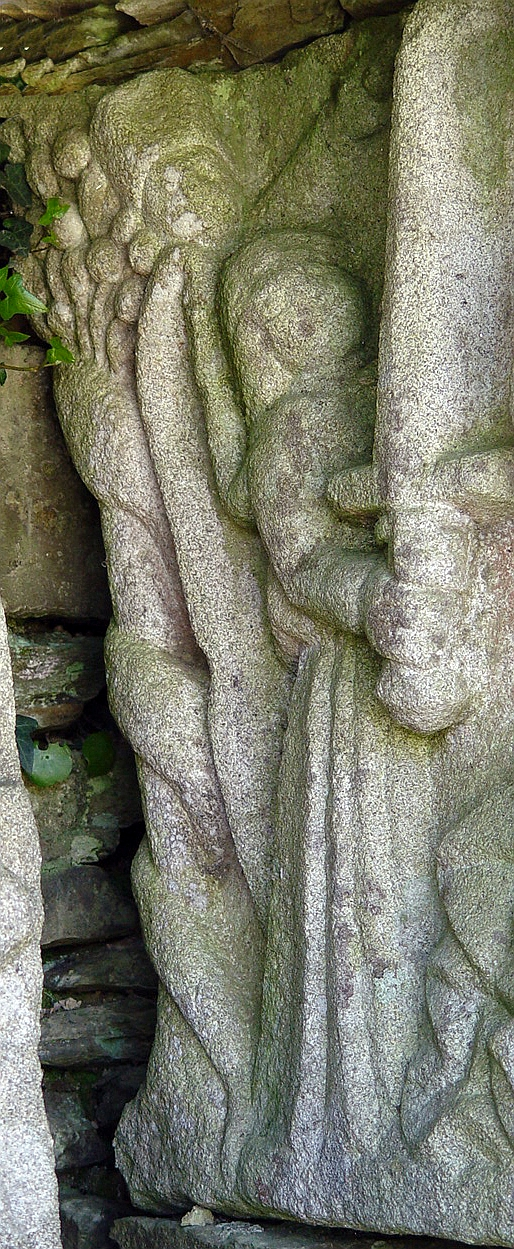
Another part of the Kerbredeur calvary

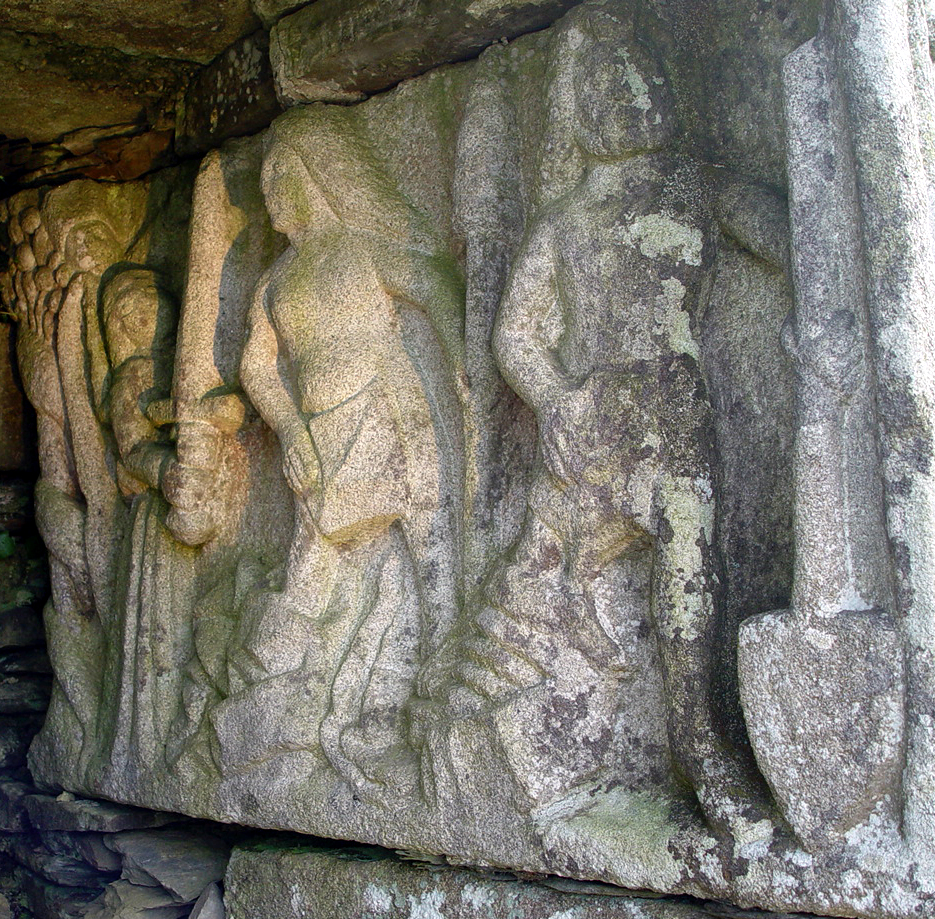
Sword-carrying angel escorts from Eden Adam, in animal skin, and Eve, with distaff; apple tree with serpent represents "original sin".

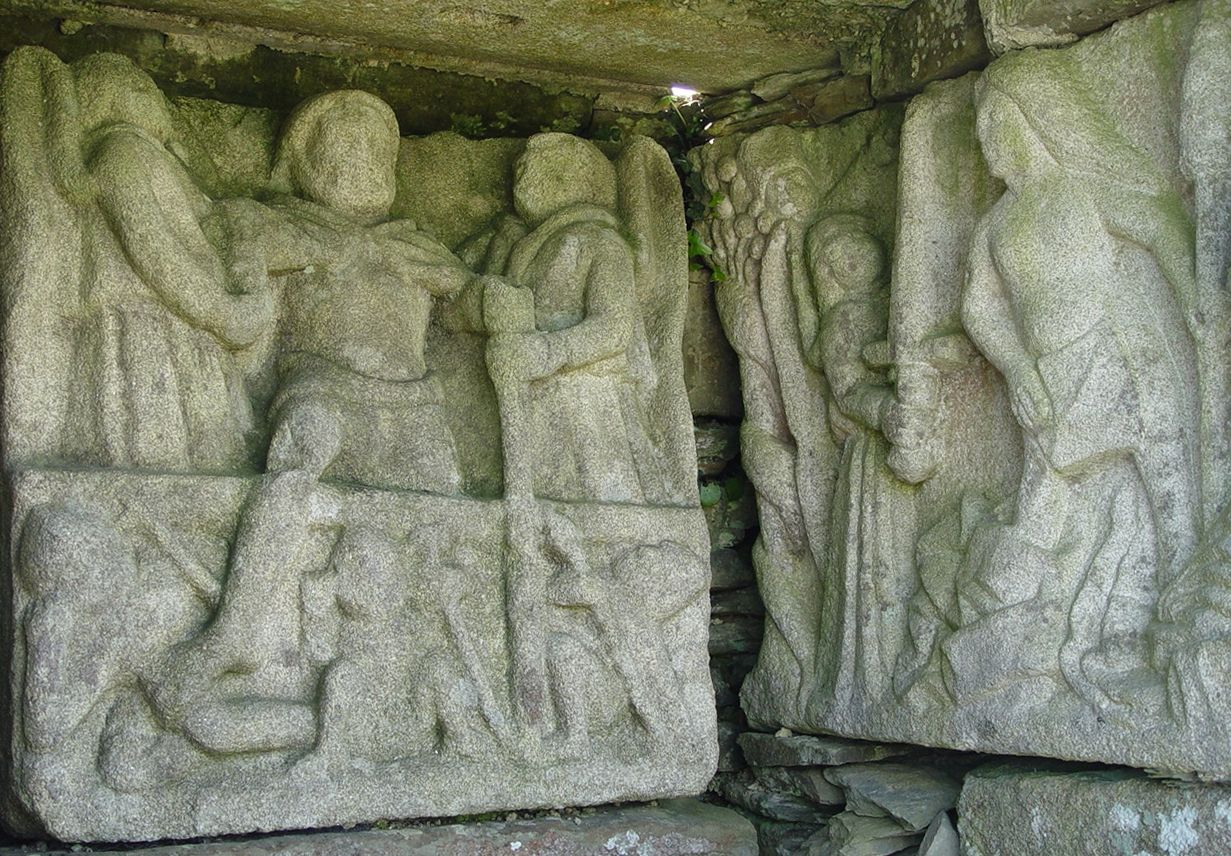
Another view of the resurrection on the left and the expulsion from Eden on the right

== Gallery of images ==
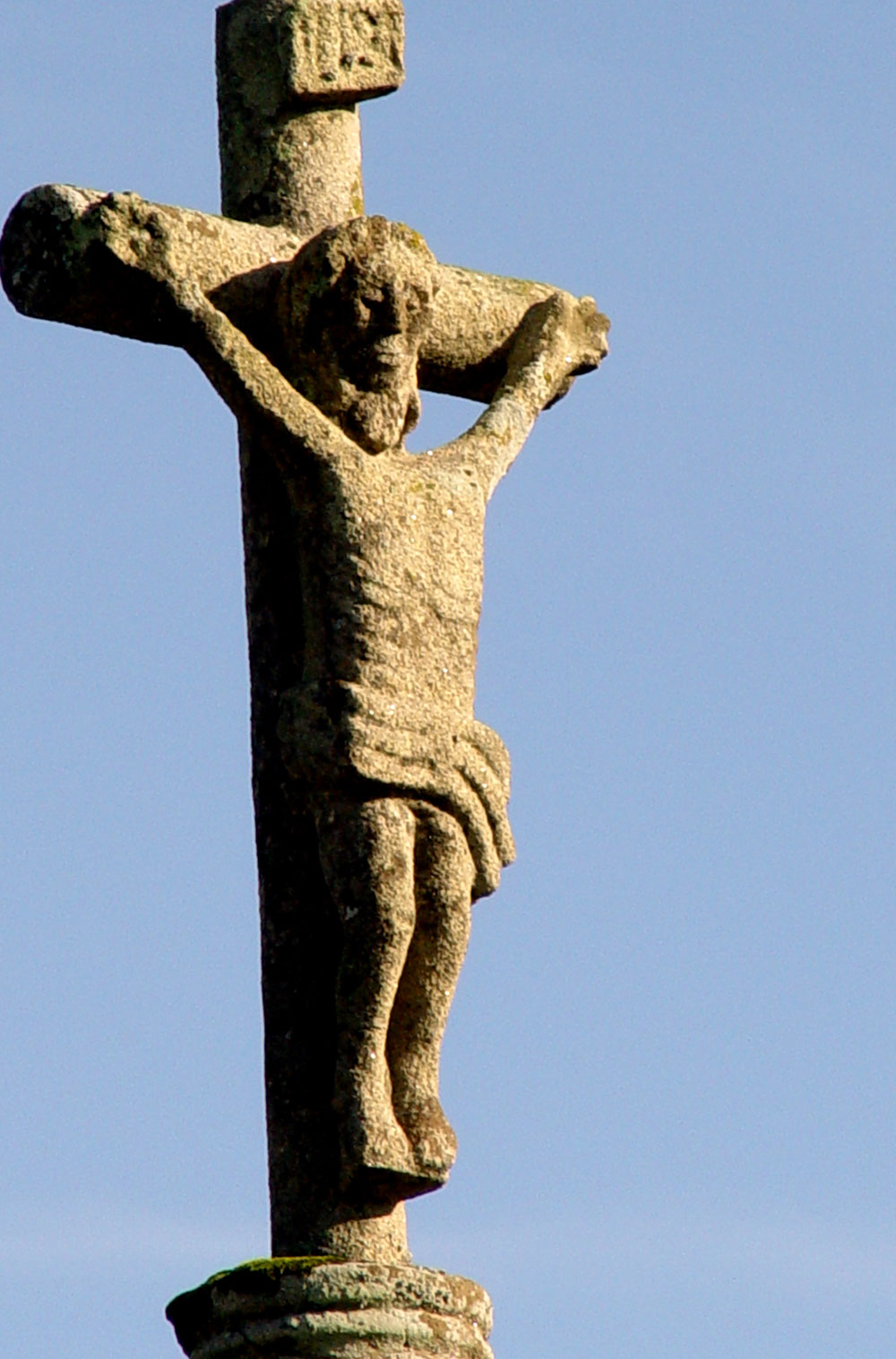
Part of calvary

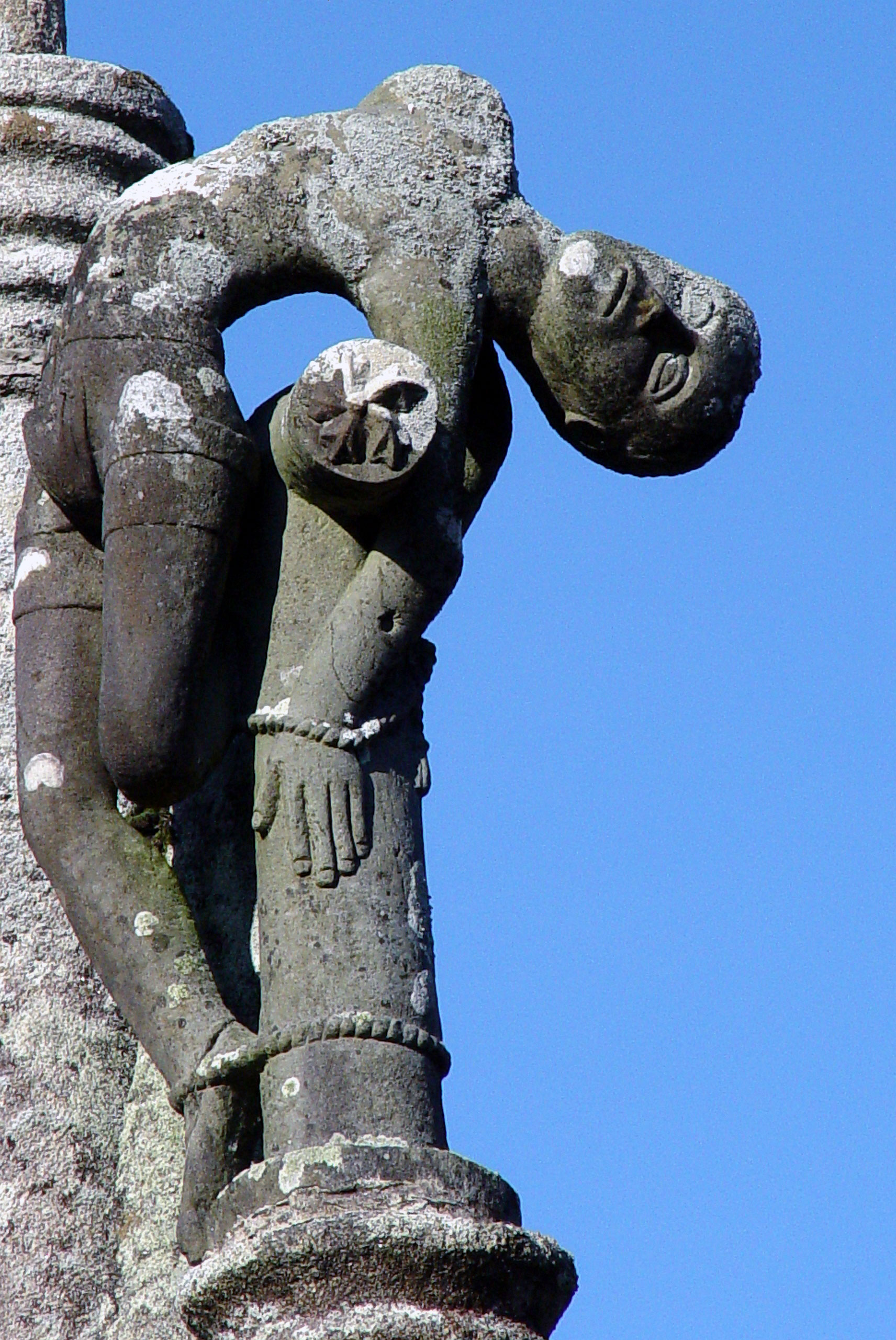
Part of calvary

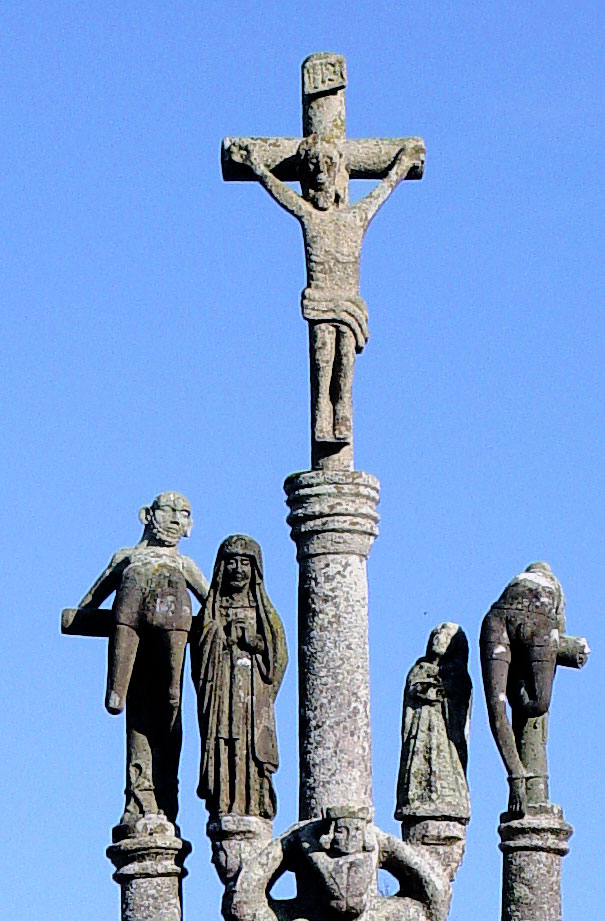
Part of calvary

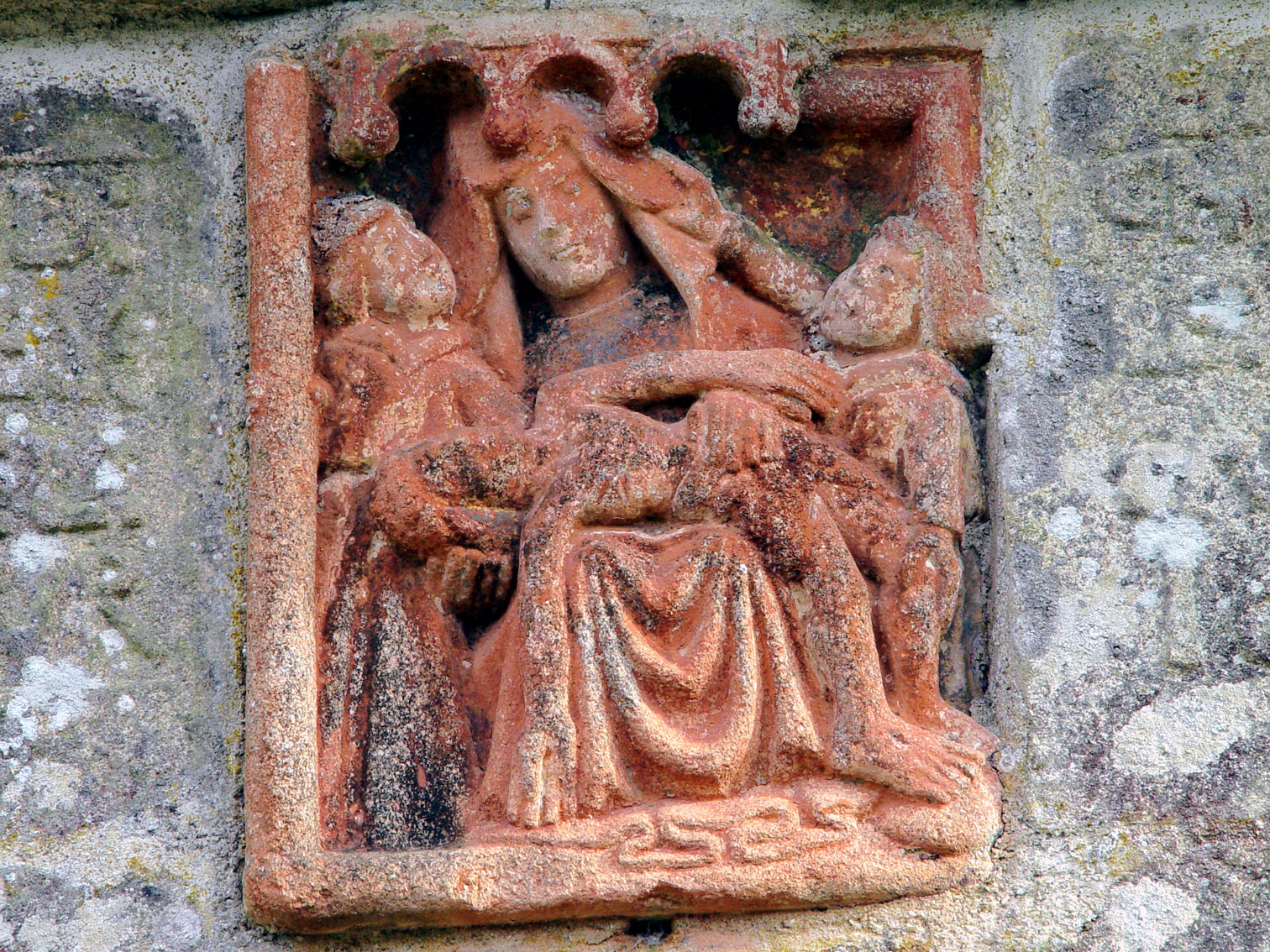
The pietà decorating the ossuary
