= Calvary at Saint-Vennec =

Coordinates: 48.1144°N 4.0694°W

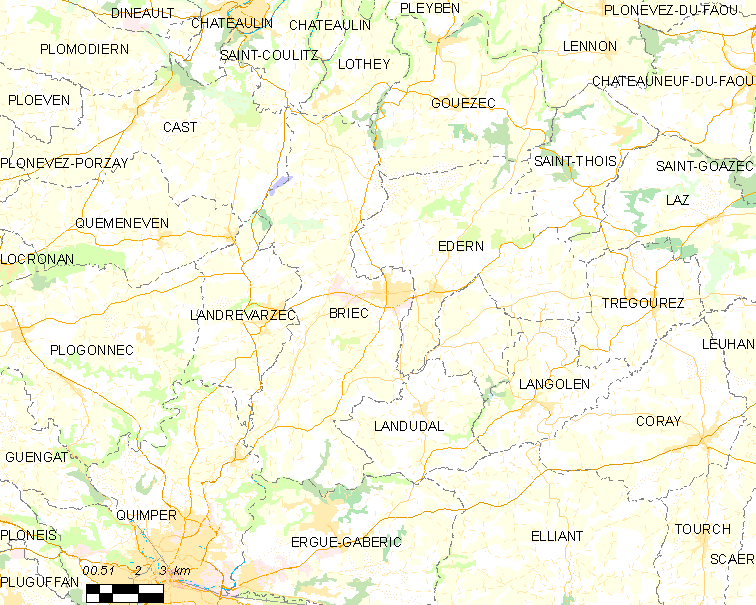
Map showing the location of Briec

The Calvary at Saint-Vennec near Briec in the arrondissement of Quimper in Brittany.

== Background and description ==
As was the case with the Calvary at Landrévarzec, this calvary is also triangular in shape and concentrates in the main on depictions of the apostles and also has a "Notre-Dame de Pitié" at the base of the cross. On ledges on the shaft of the central cross are statues of the Virgin Mary, Mary Magdalene and John the Evangelist. At the summit of the central cross, Jesus is shown on the cross with angels collecting his blood into chalices. Around the pedestal platform are statues of the apostles although some there originally have gone and some have no heads. St Peter can be recognised by the very large key which he holds. The calvary dates to 1556.

== Gallery ==
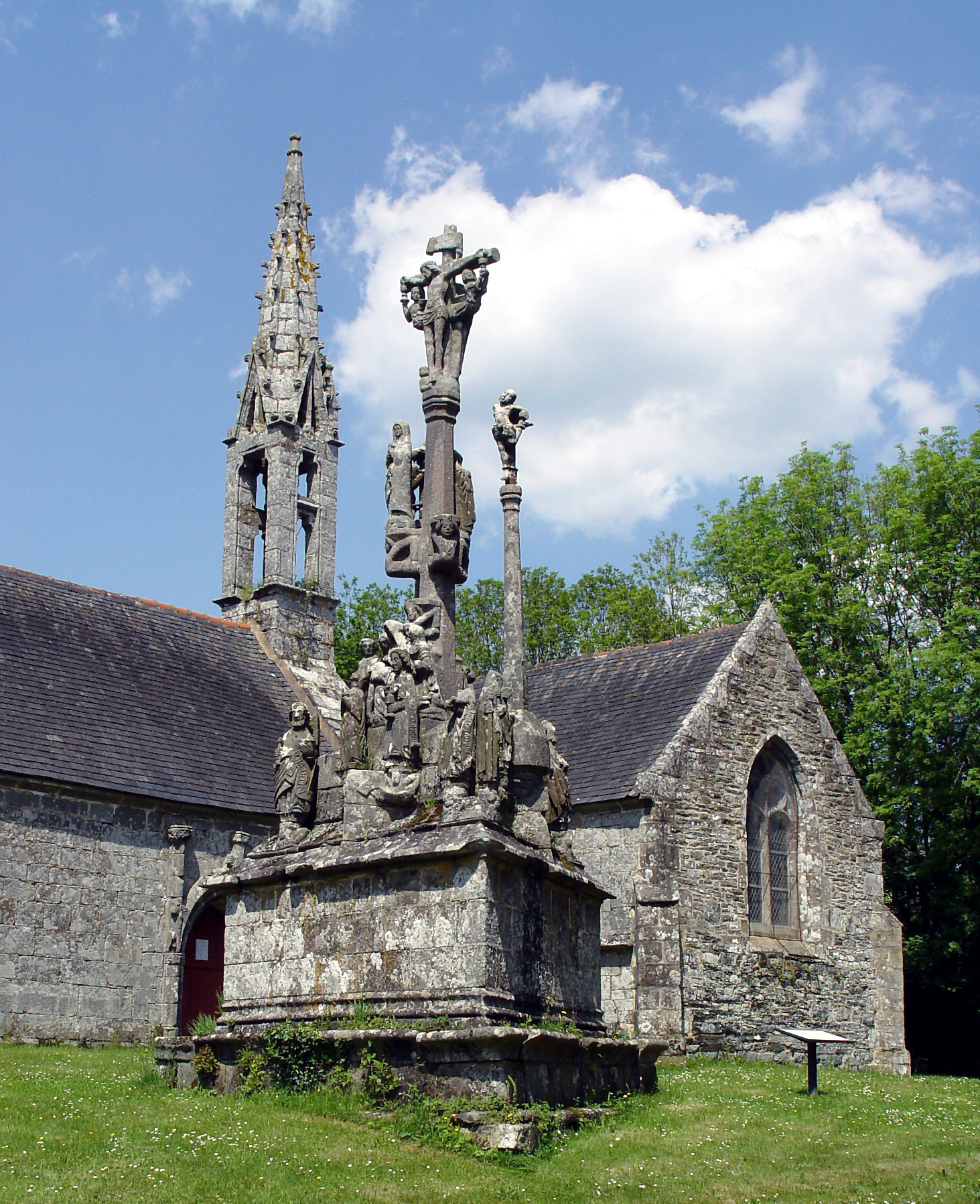
The calvary

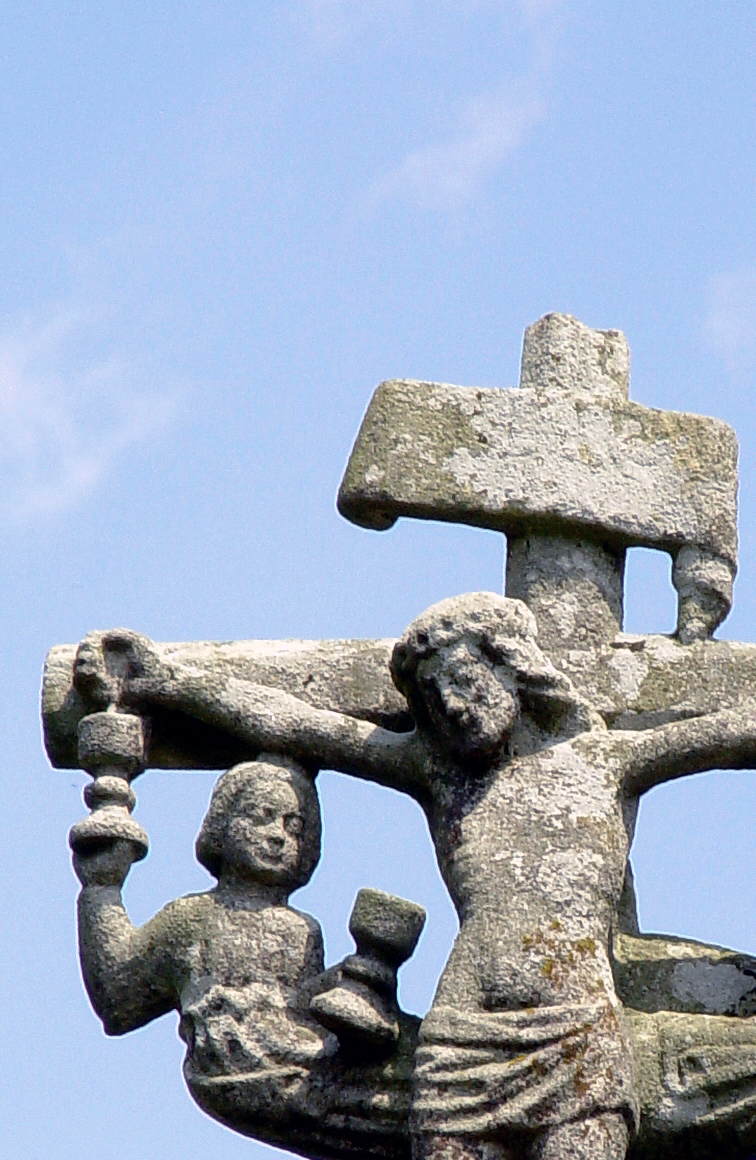
An angel collects Jesus' blood in a chalice

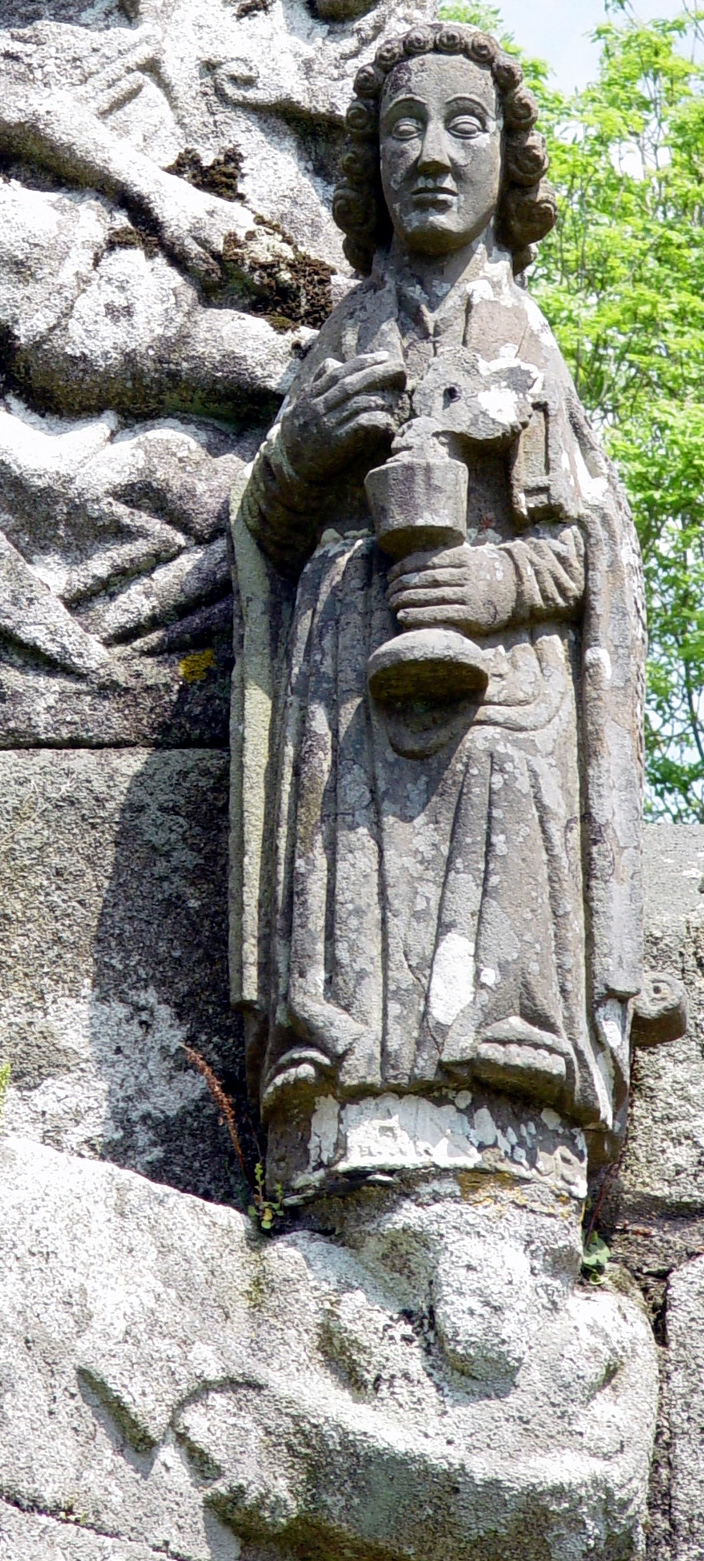
John the Evangelist.

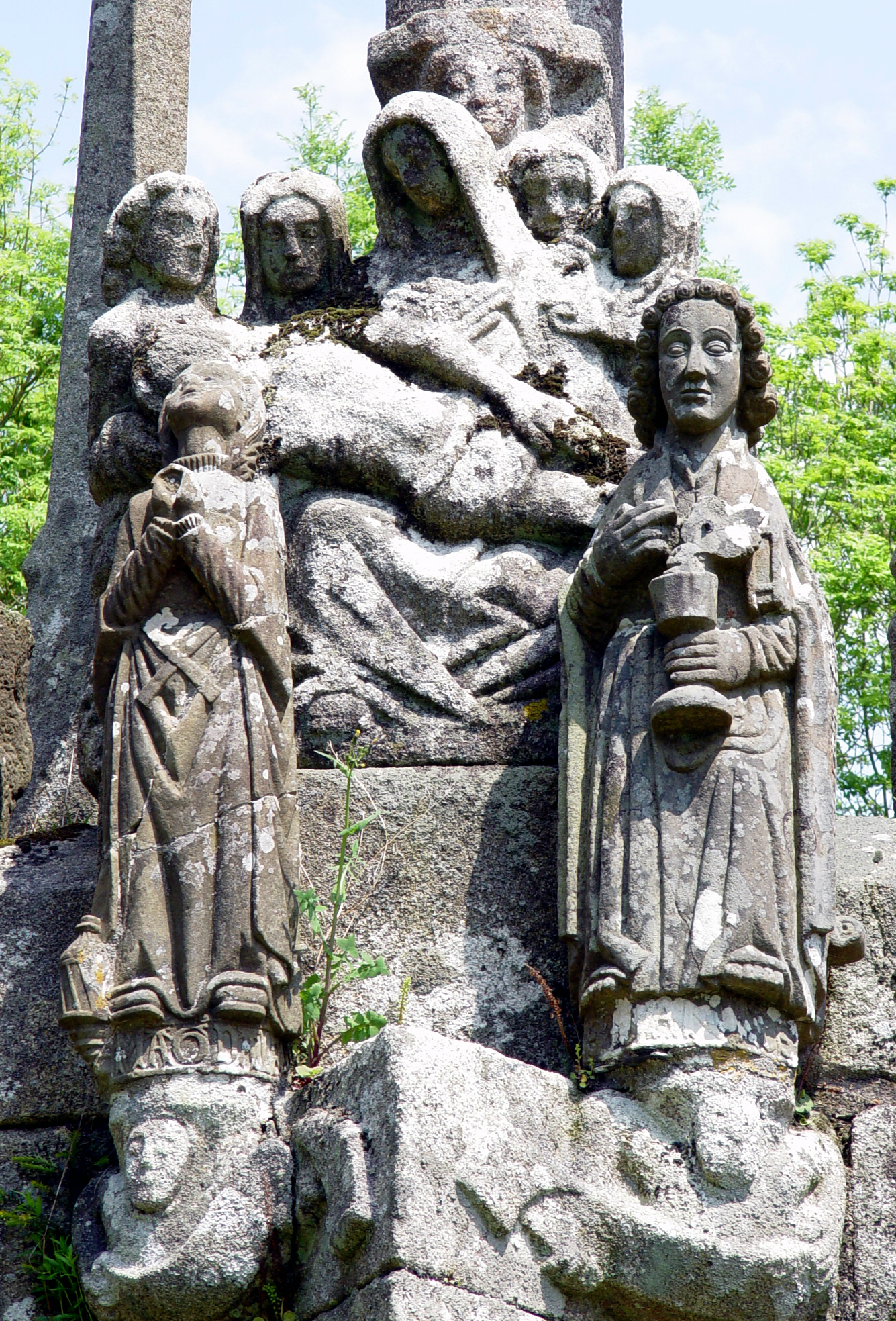
The Pieta

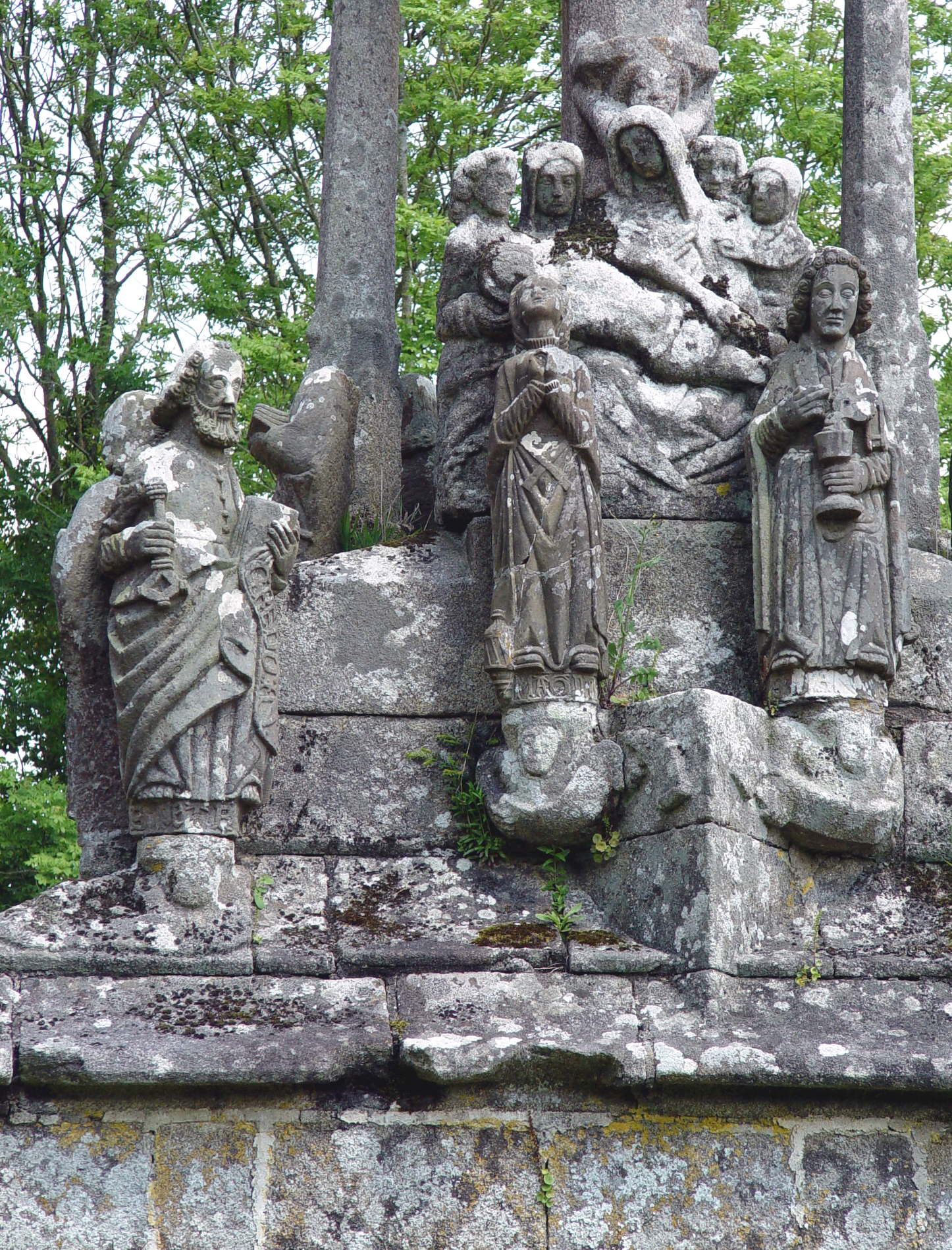
Here we see St Peter with key, Mary Magdalene and John the Evangelist with the Pieta in the background

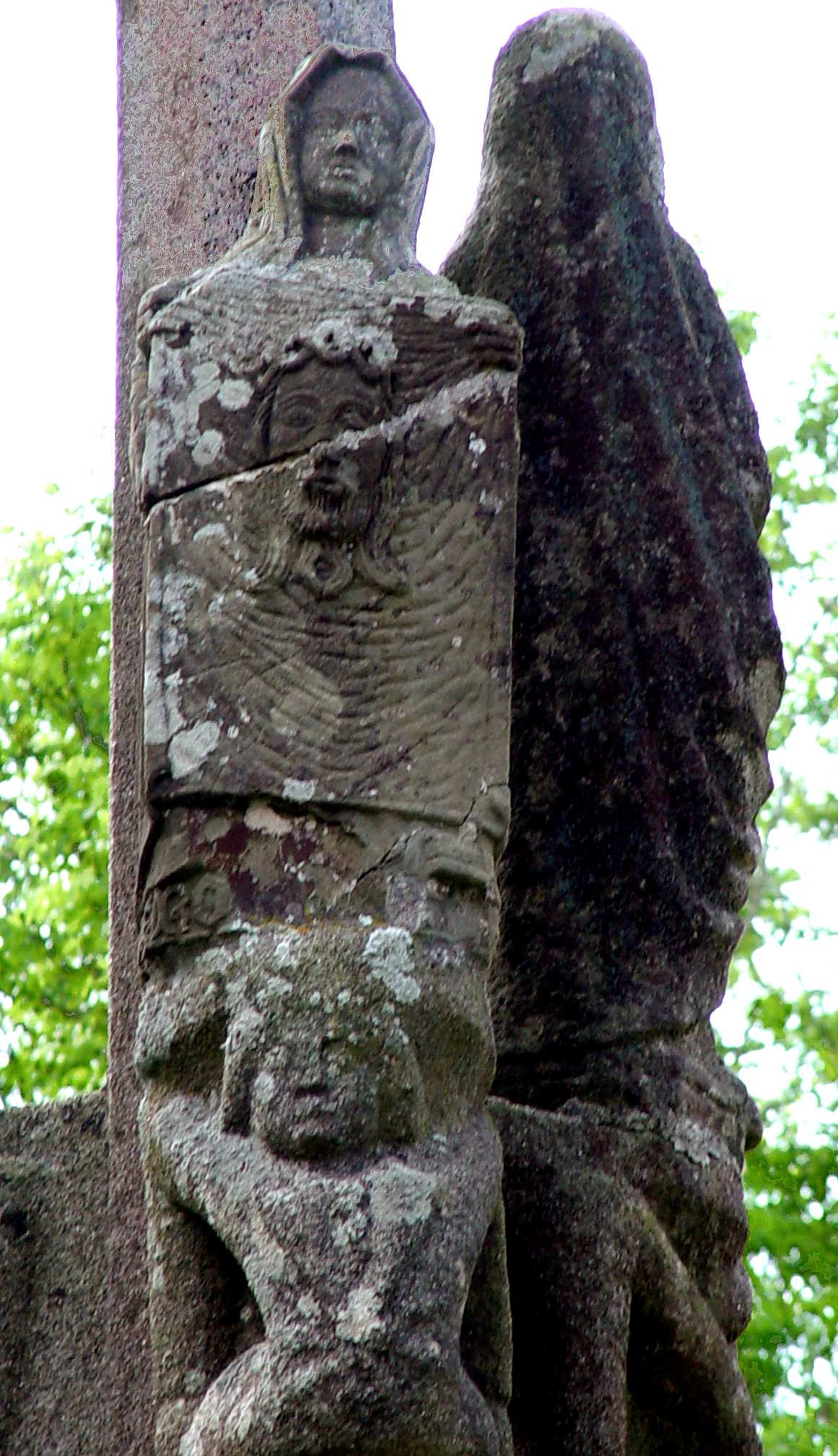
St Veronica with veil.

== See also ==
- Calvary at Landrévarzec
