= Calvary at Landrévarzec =

Group statue in Quimper, Brittany, France

Coordinates: 48.0792°N 4.0657°W

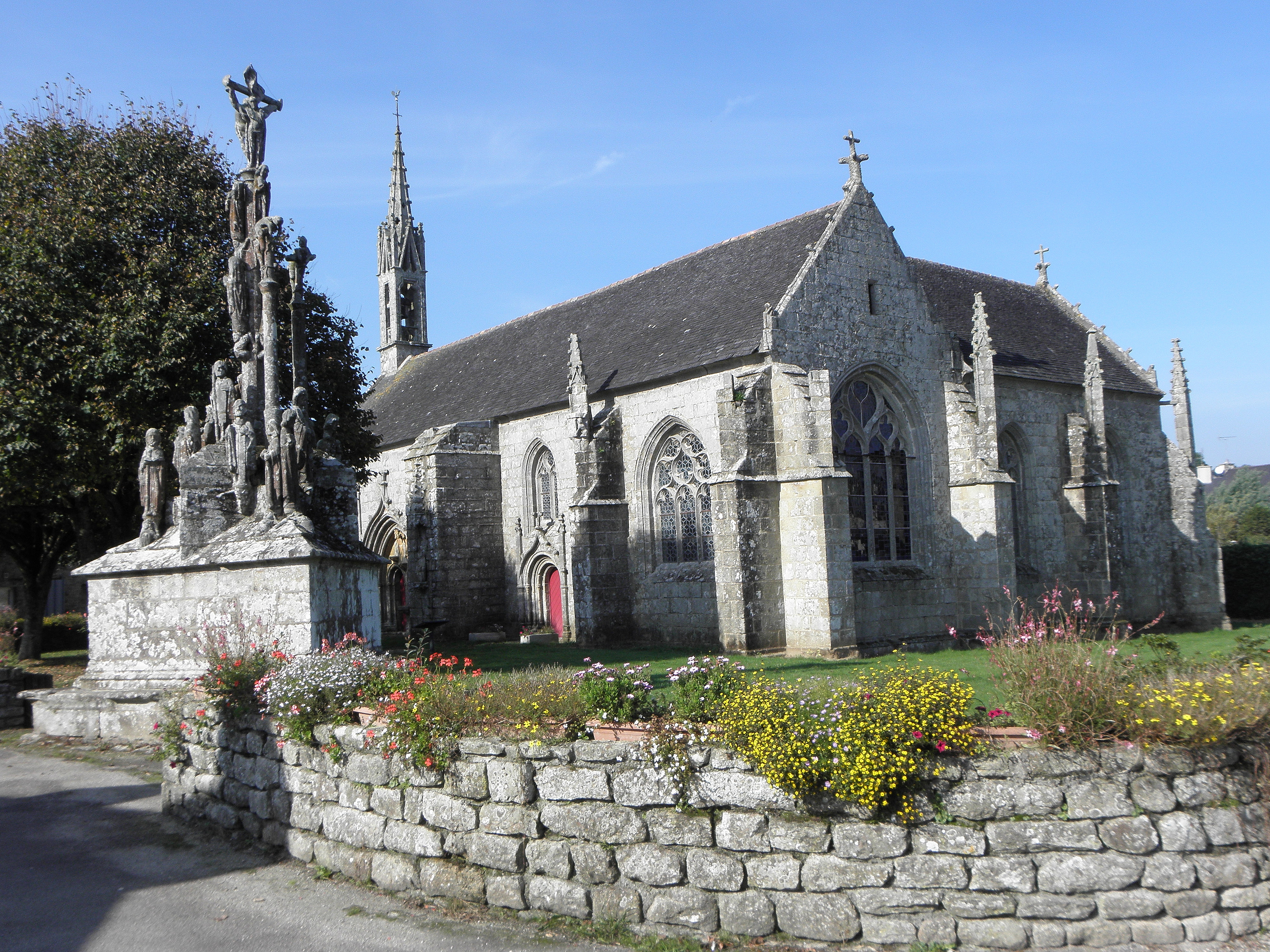
The calvary at Quilinen

The Calvary at Landrévarzec is a monument in the form of a group statue in Quimper, Brittany, NW France. It is located in the commune of Landrévarzec in the arrondissement of Quimper, and stands next to the Chapelle Notre-Dame de Quilinen.

The Quilinen Calvary was erected in 1547. The calvary stands next to the chapel and there is also a fountain nearby. The Notre-Dame-de-Quilinen Chapel dates to the end of the 15th century and the calvary to the 16th century and has been a "Monument Historique" since 1925.

== Background and description ==
Built in the 16th century, it includes three crosses. On the shaft of the central cross are two small ledges on which there are statues depicting St John the Evangelist and two female saints; at the base of the cross is a pietà or "Notre-Dame de Pitié" depicting the Virgin Mary with her dead son across her lap, accompanied by one of the female saints and John the Evangelist. At the back of the cross is a depiction of the Virgin Mary holding the baby Jesus in her arms; and a little higher up the shaft is a depiction of Mary Magdalene with her pot of ointment. At the summit of the cross on the reverse side of the depiction of the crucifixion there is a depiction of the resurrected Christ. The two smaller crosses bear the contorted bodies of the two robbers executed alongside Jesus. The calvary is triangular in shape and around the pedestal's platform are depictions of each of the apostles and their attributes. St Peter holds a key, Andrew the Apostle a cross, James the Less a fuller's club and a closed book, John the Evangelist a chalice, Bartholomew the Apostle a knife, James the Elder a club and an open book. St Philip holds a cross and a closed book, Matthew the Evangelist a bill-hook and a book in a bag. Thomas the Apostle holds an open book and a set-square, Simon the Zealot a saw and an open book, Matthew the Evangelist holds a halberd and a closed book. One statue is missing and Judas Iscariot carries a stick and a cleaver. Also included is a statue of St Yves.

- On the shaft ledges the depiction of John the Evangelist shows him with arms crossed.
- The resurrected Christ on the reverse of the depiction of Christ on the cross points to the wound in his side. He raises his right hand to give a blessing.
- In the pietà the Virgin Mary supports the dead Jesus on her knees and is helped by John the Evangelist and Mary Magdalene.

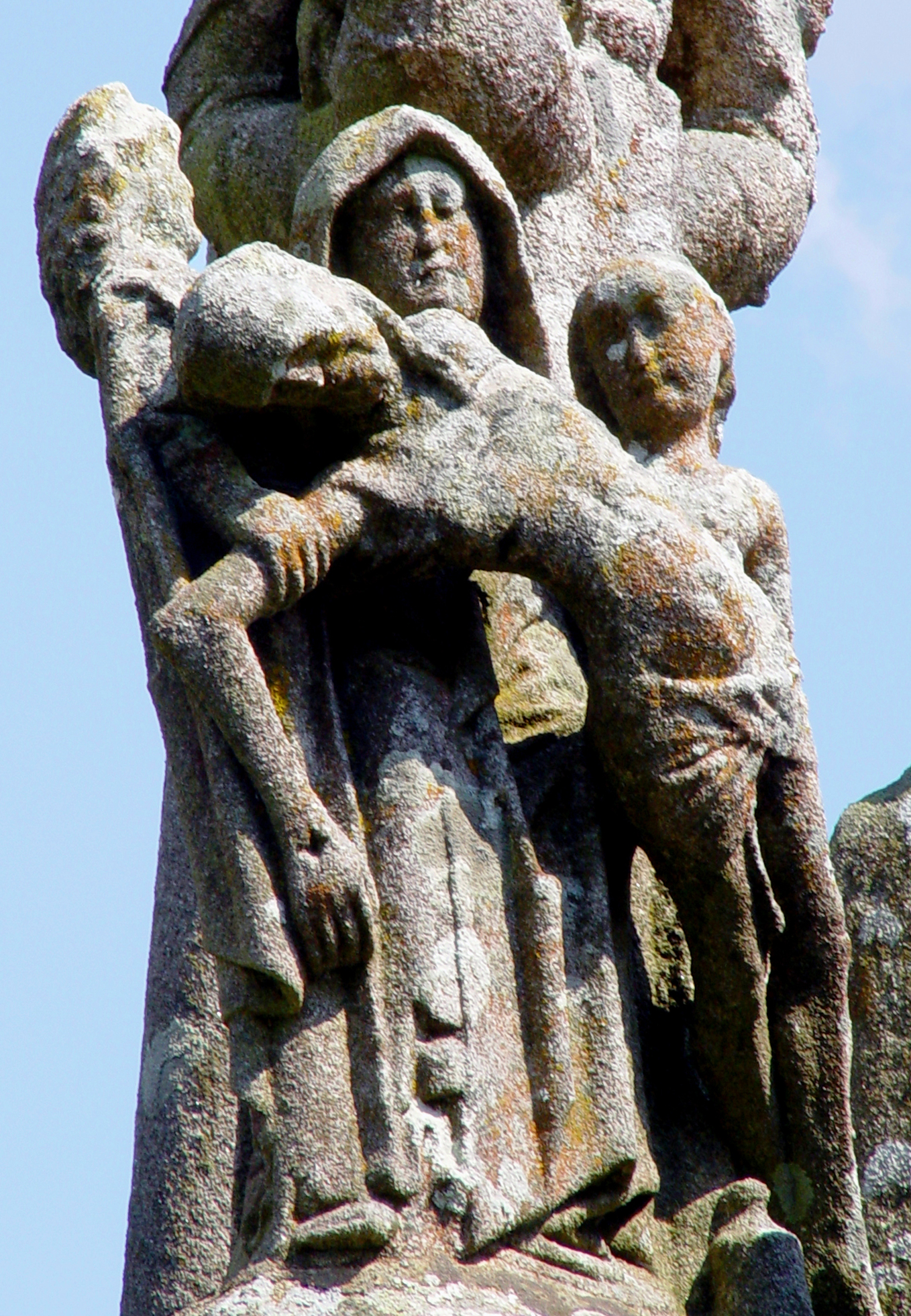
The pietà at Quilinen. As can be seen, the monument is badly worn.

== Gallery ==
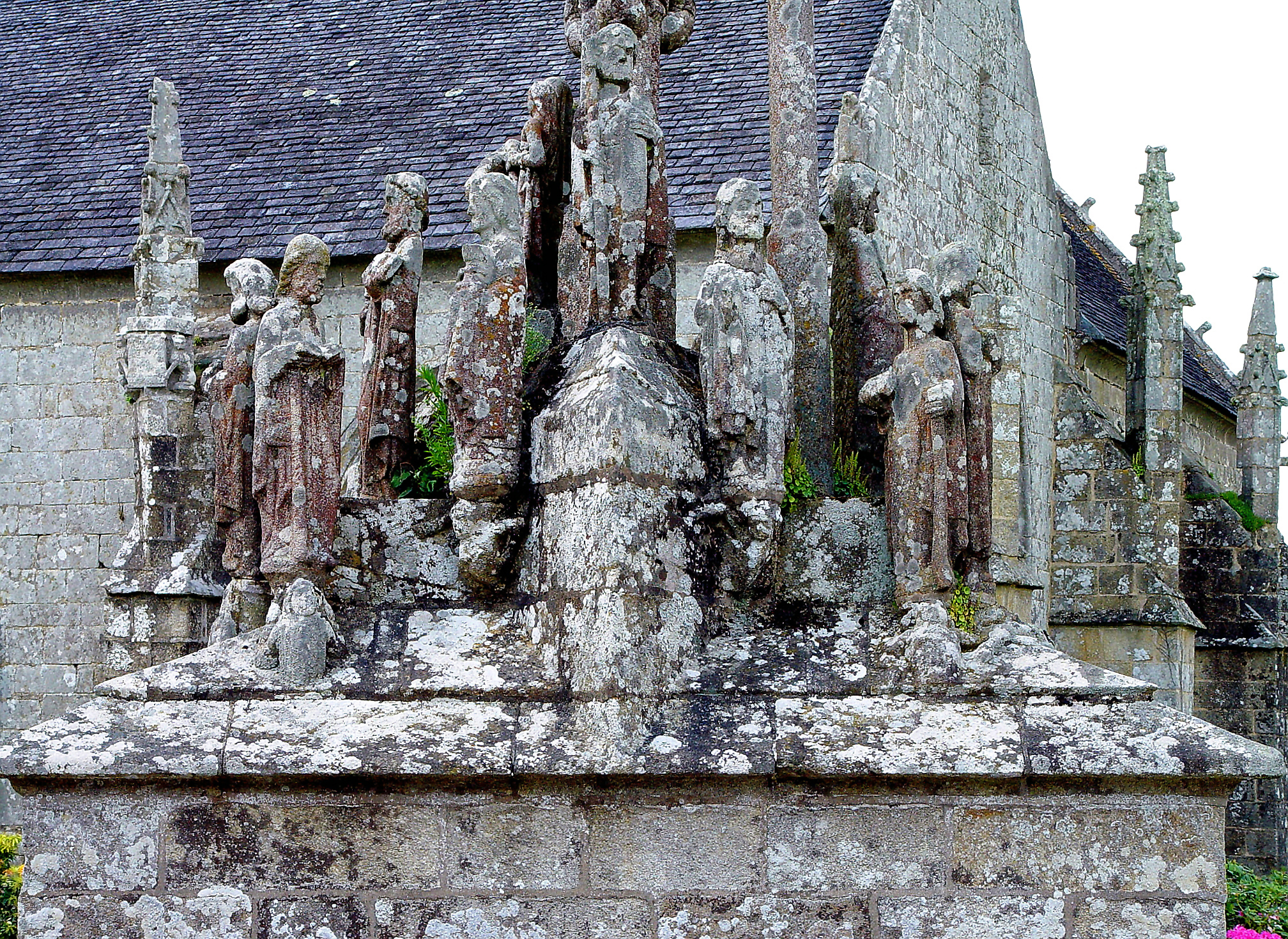
The south face of the Quilinen calvary. Various apostles stand around the pedestal's platform.

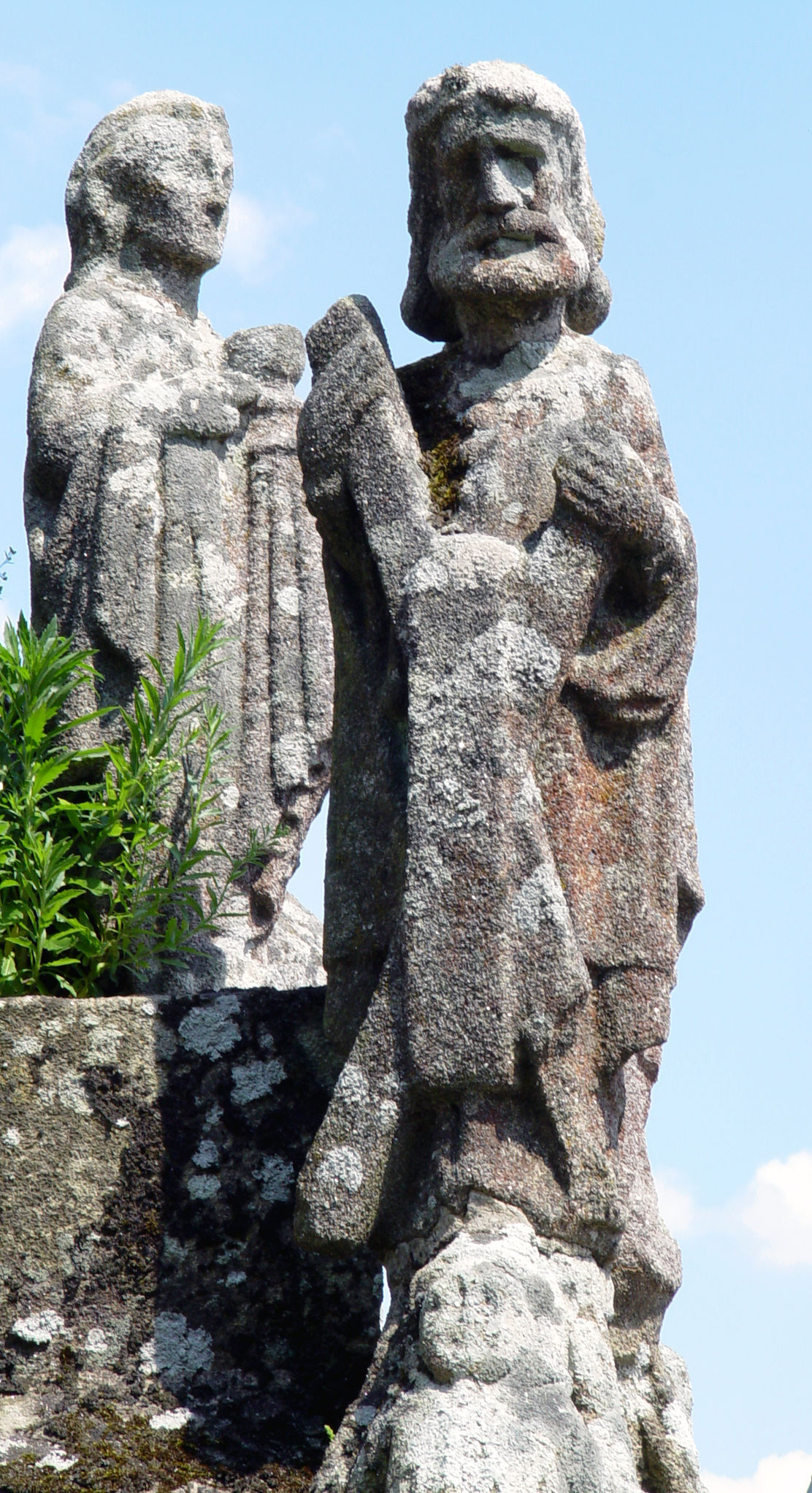
St Andrew

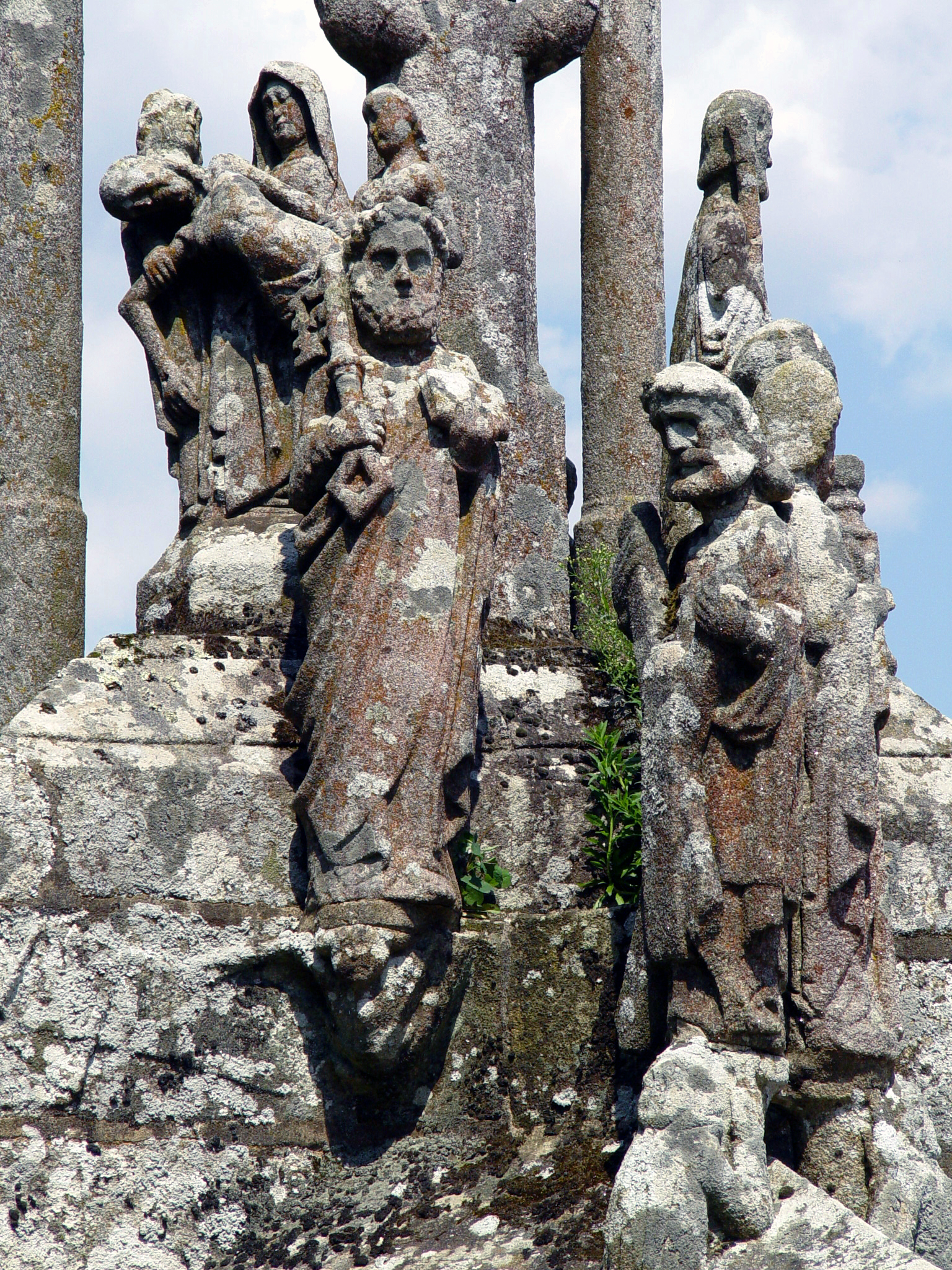
St Peter and St Andrew

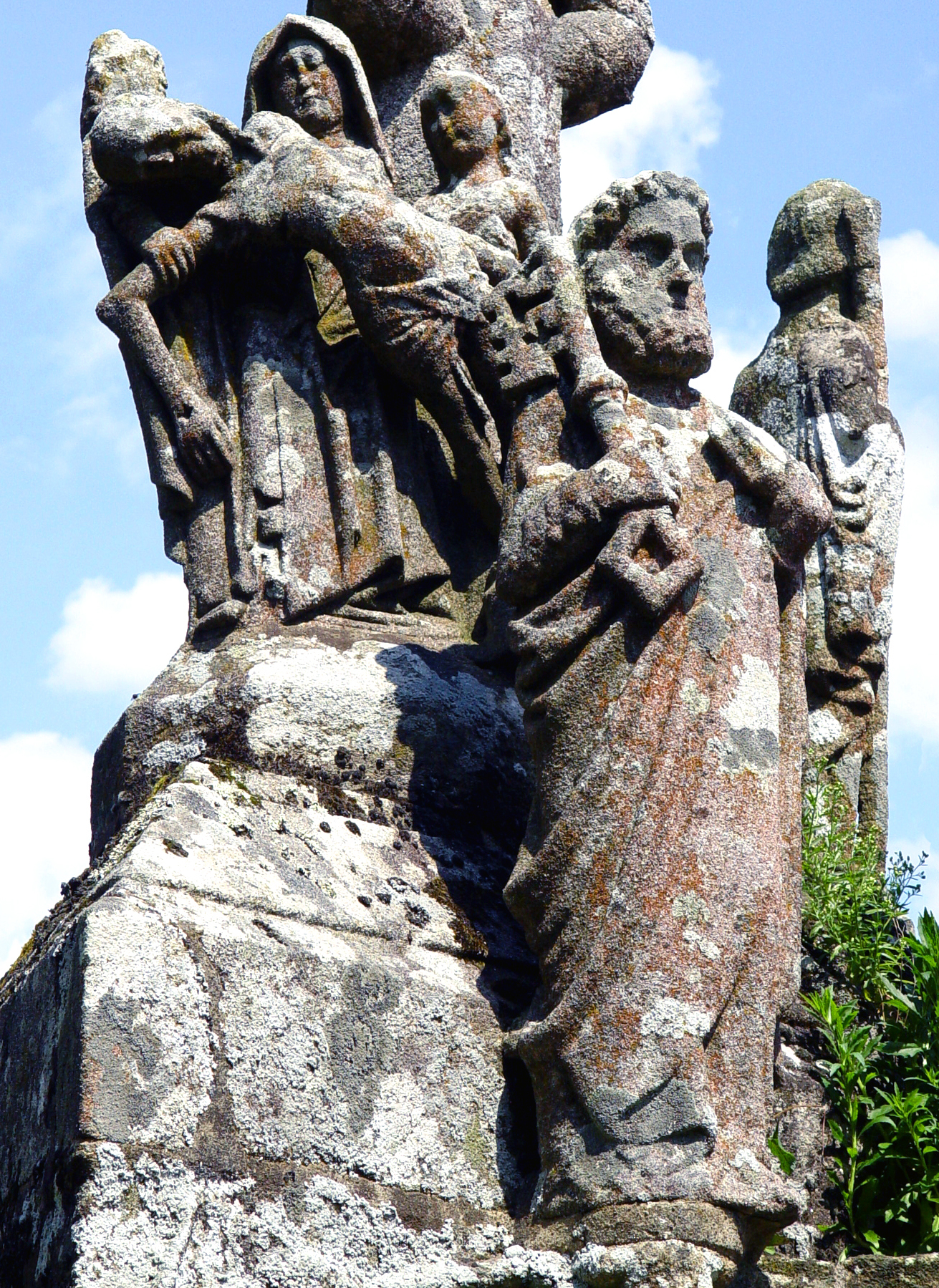
The Pietà

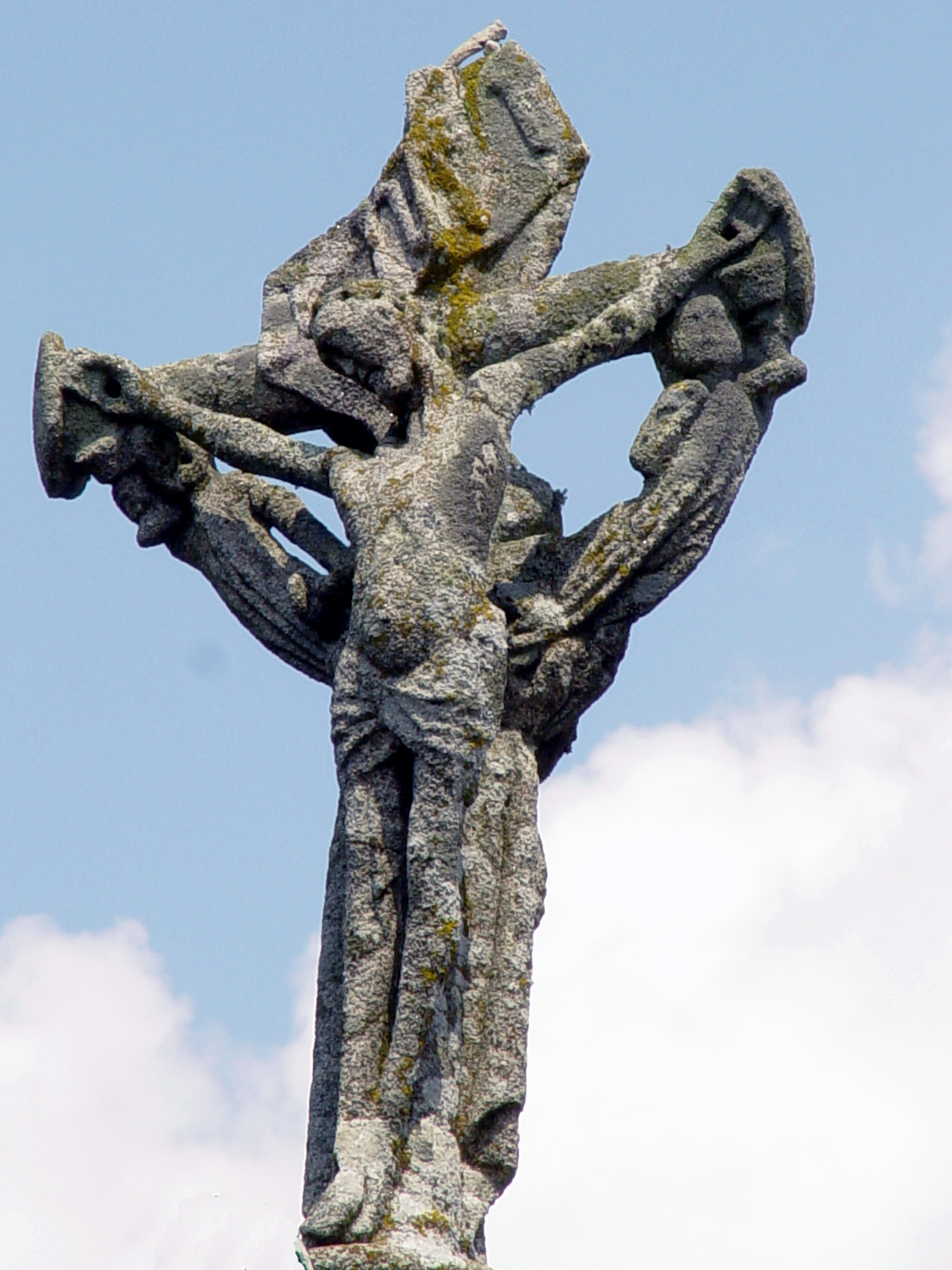
Jesus on the cross

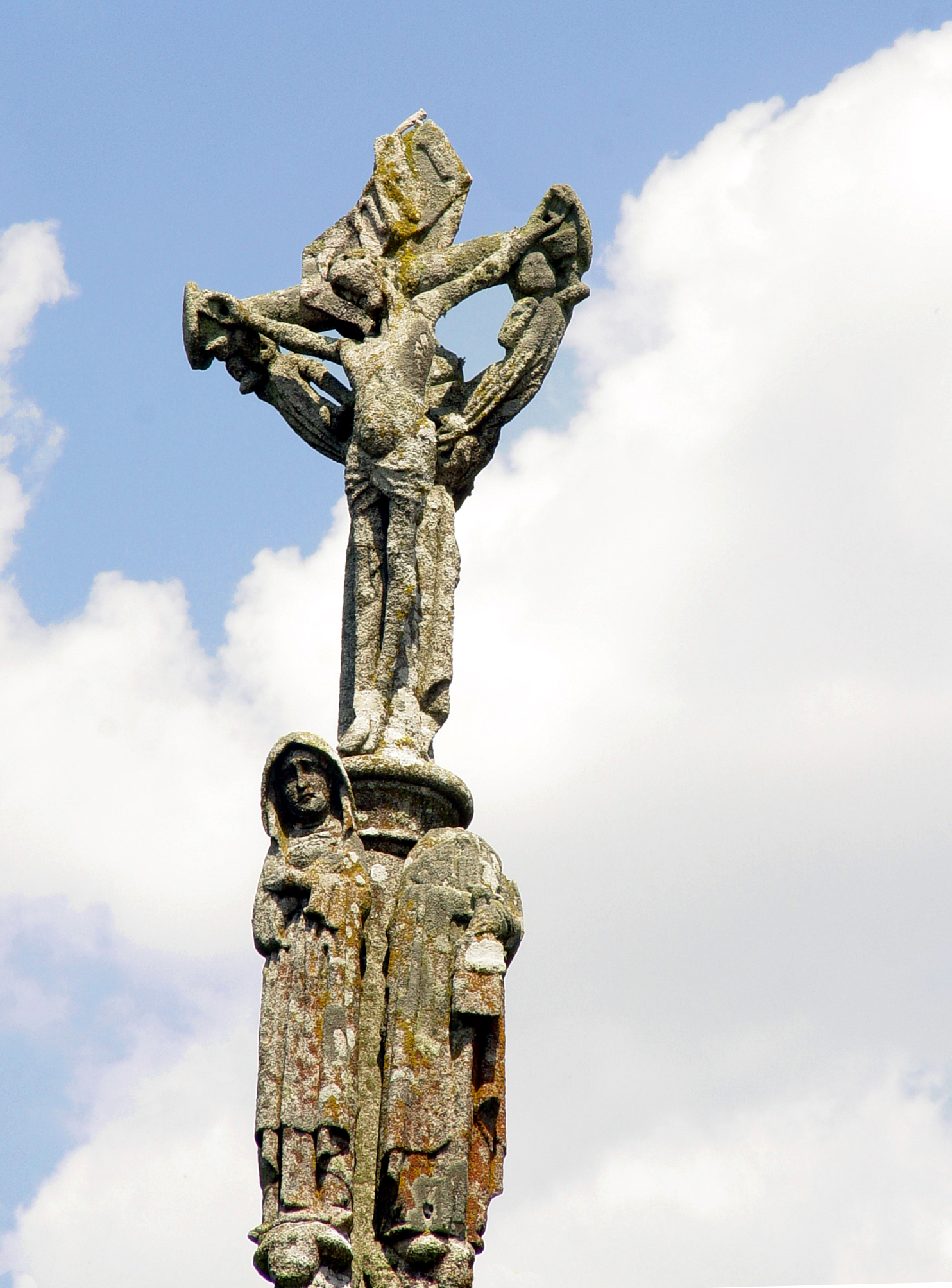
View of cross

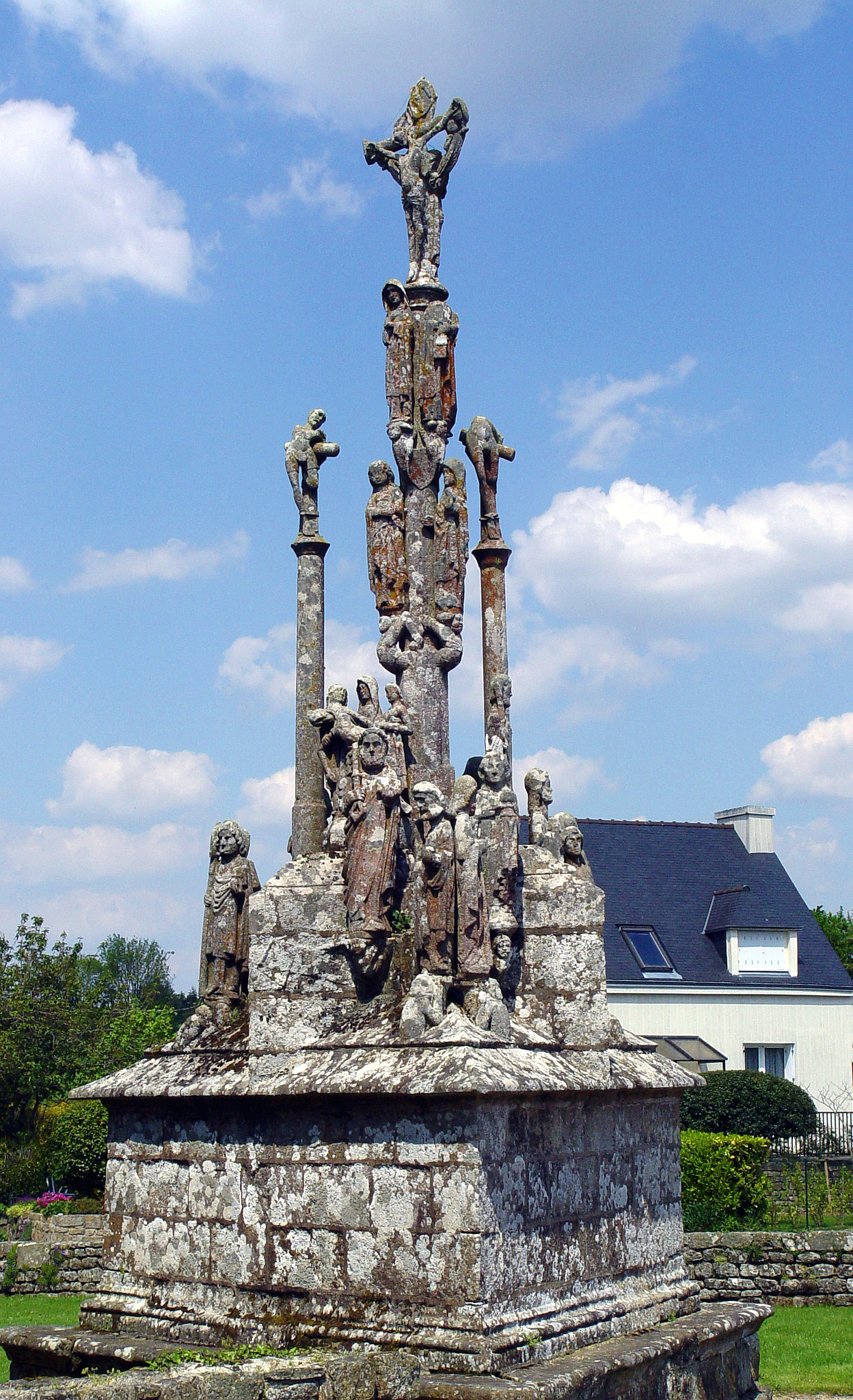
View of calvary from the west.

== See also ==
- Calvary at Saint-Vennec
