= Laz, Finistère =

Laz Laz
- Commune
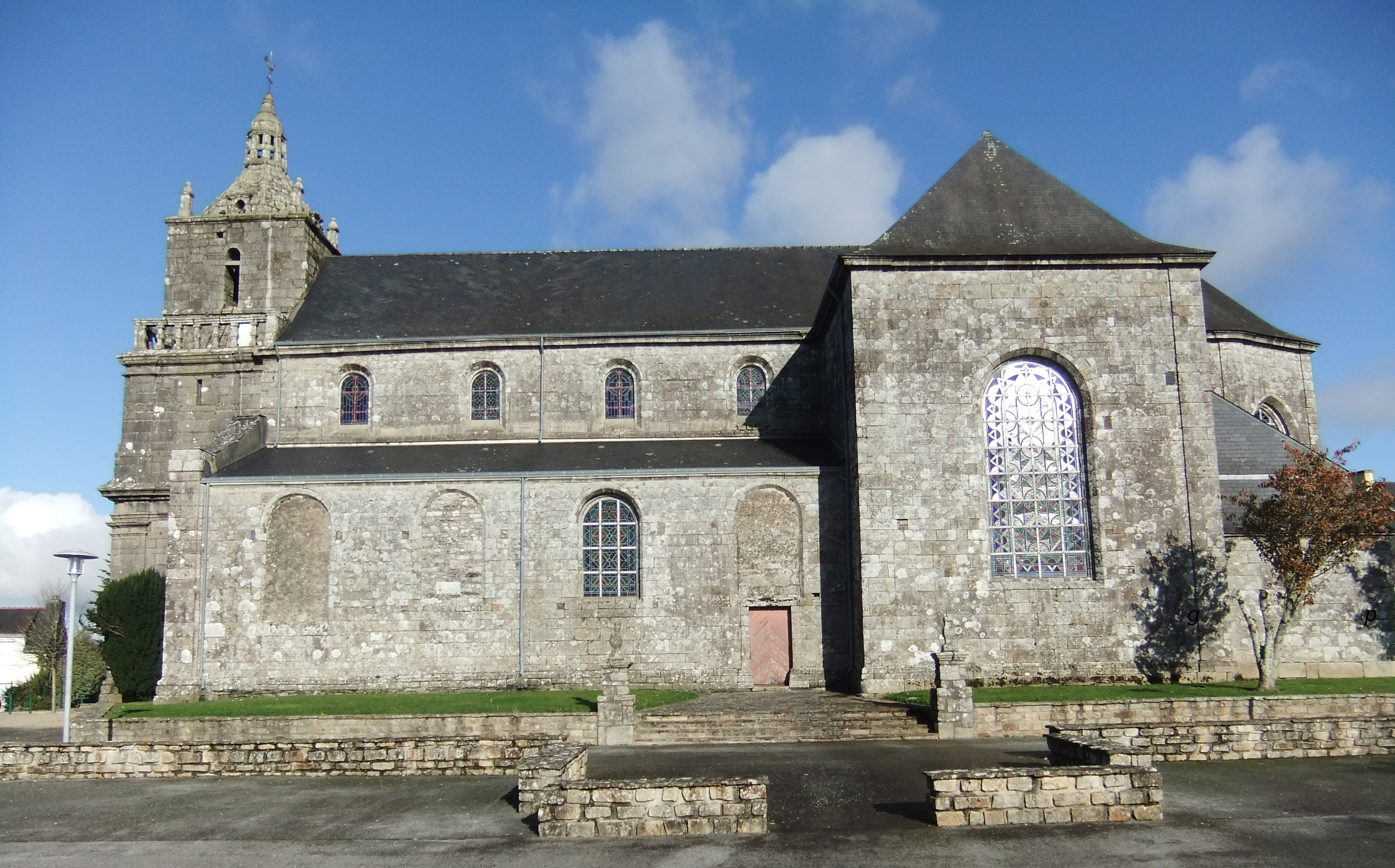
- The church of Saint-Germain and Saint-Louis, in Laz

- Coat of arms
- Location of Laz
- Location within France Location within Brittany
- Coordinates: 48°08′18″N 3°50′02″W
- Country: France
- Region: Brittany
- Department: Finistère
- Arrondissement: Châteaulin
- Canton: Briec
- Intercommunality: Haute Cornouaille

Government
  - Mayor (2020–2026): Annick Barré
- Area^{1}: 34.44 km^{2} (13.30 sq mi)
- Highest elevation: 295 m (968 ft)
- Lowest elevation: 31 m (102 ft)
- Population (2023): 685
  - Density: 19.9/km^{2} (51.5/sq mi)
- Time zone: UTC+01:00 (CET)
  - Summer (DST): UTC+02:00 (CEST)
- INSEE/Postal code: 29122 /29520
- ^{1} French Land Register data, which excludes lakes, ponds, glaciers > 1 km^{2} (0.386 sq mi or 247 acres) and river estuaries.

Laz (French pronunciation: [laz]) is a commune in the Finistère department of Brittany in north-western France.

== Geography ==
The commune is situated at the heart of a hilly and forest-covered region called the Montagnes Noires (black mountains) which extends for approximately 30 kilometres between the communes of Gourin to the east and Gouezec in the west.

The population of the commune is quite scattered, forming small settlements that could be considered as hamlets. Laz offers outlooks over the valley of the Odet to the south and the canalized Aulne river and its locks to the north.

== Map ==
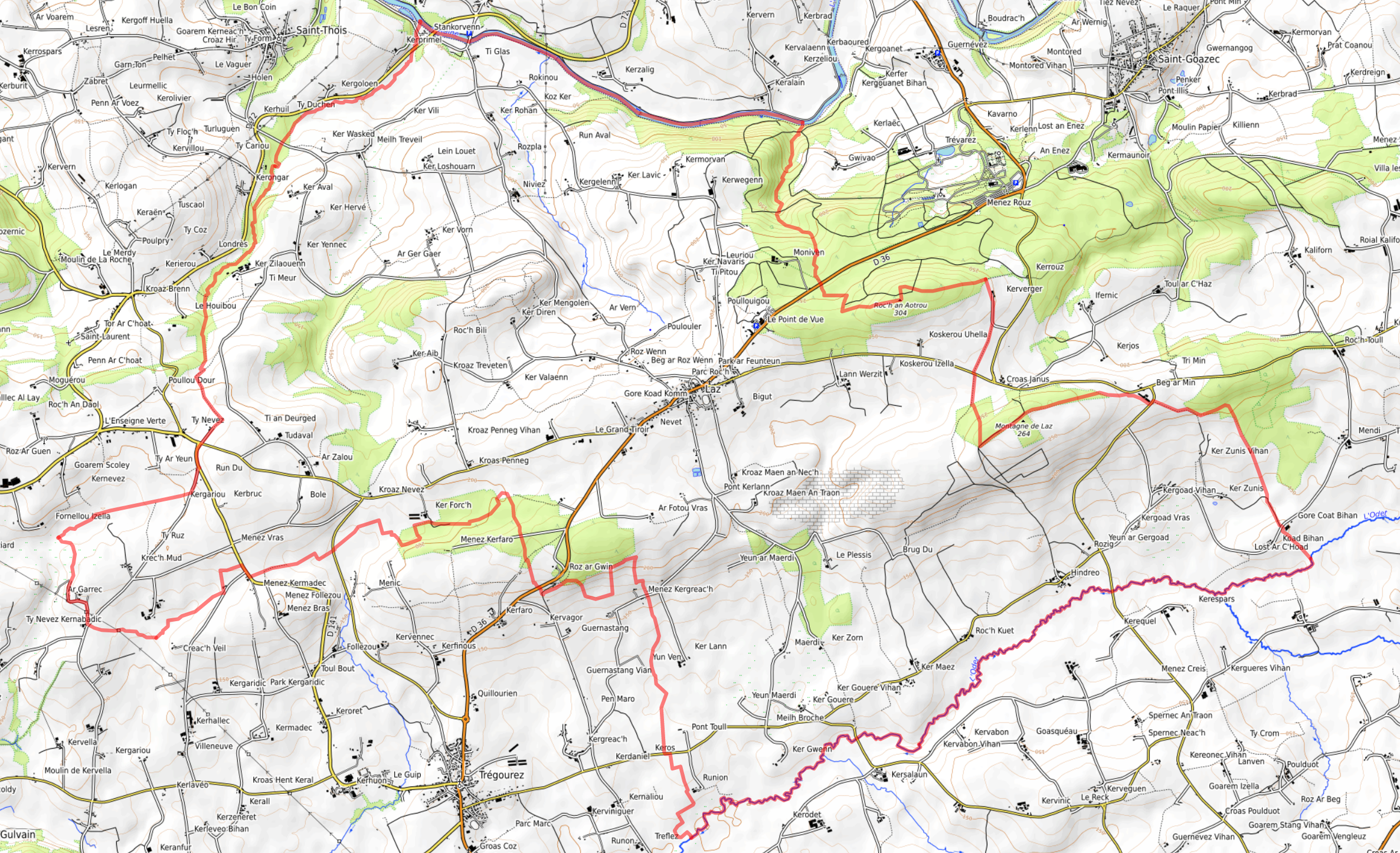
Topographic map

== Economy ==
Agricultural development was held back by the French Revolution and the subsequent royalist revolt, combined with poor soil conditions. The commune started to grow in the middle of the 19th century, when the use of fertiliser and other new techniques allowed the land to be brought into full agricultural use.

== Population ==
Inhabitants of Laz are called in French Laziens.

Historical population

Year	Pop.	±% p.a.
1793	1,280	—
1800	1,383	+1.11%
1806	1,133	−3.27%
1821	1,291	+0.87%
1831	1,358	+0.51%
1836	1,429	+1.02%
1841	1,404	−0.35%
1846	1,555	+2.06%
1851	1,433	−1.62%
1856	1,242	−2.82%
1861	1,251	+0.14%
1866	1,250	−0.02%
1872	1,201	−0.66%
1876	1,209	+0.17%
1881	1,238	+0.48%
1886	1,245	+0.11%
1891	1,203	−0.68%
1896	1,313	+1.77%
1901	1,389	+1.13%

Year	Pop.	±% p.a.
1906	1,412	+0.33%
1911	1,464	+0.73%
1921	1,383	−0.57%
1926	1,384	+0.01%
1931	1,370	−0.20%
1936	1,290	−1.20%
1946	1,211	−0.63%
1954	1,115	−1.03%
1962	1,025	−1.05%
1968	996	−0.48%
1975	863	−2.03%
1982	786	−1.33%
1990	706	−1.33%
1999	694	−0.19%
2007	767	+1.26%
2012	685	−2.24%
2017	661	−0.71%
2023	685	+0.60%

Source: EHESS and INSEE (1968-2023)

== See also ==
- Communes of the Finistère department
- Listing of the works of the atelier of the Maître de Tronoën
- Listing of the works of the Maître de Laz
