= List of works of the Maître de Laz =

This is a listing/"catalogue raisonnė" of the works of the Maître de Laz. His work, dating to around 1527, can be seen in various parts of Brittany. He is unusual amongst sculptors in this region working in the 15th and 16th century in that he often worked using "grés feldspathique" as opposed to granite or kersanton stone. He executed pietàs in Laz, Finistère, Briec-de-l'Odet, Saint-Hernin and Plourac'h and in Plourac'h, he executed statuary for the parish church. Grés feldspathique had been used earlier in Laz in 1350 with a statue of a dying cavalier placed by the chevet of the Église Saint-Germain-et-Saint-Louis. It was also used by the Maître de Tronoën (Listing of the works of the atelier of the Maître de Tronoën) for the bas-relief in the entry to the old presbytery at Laz.

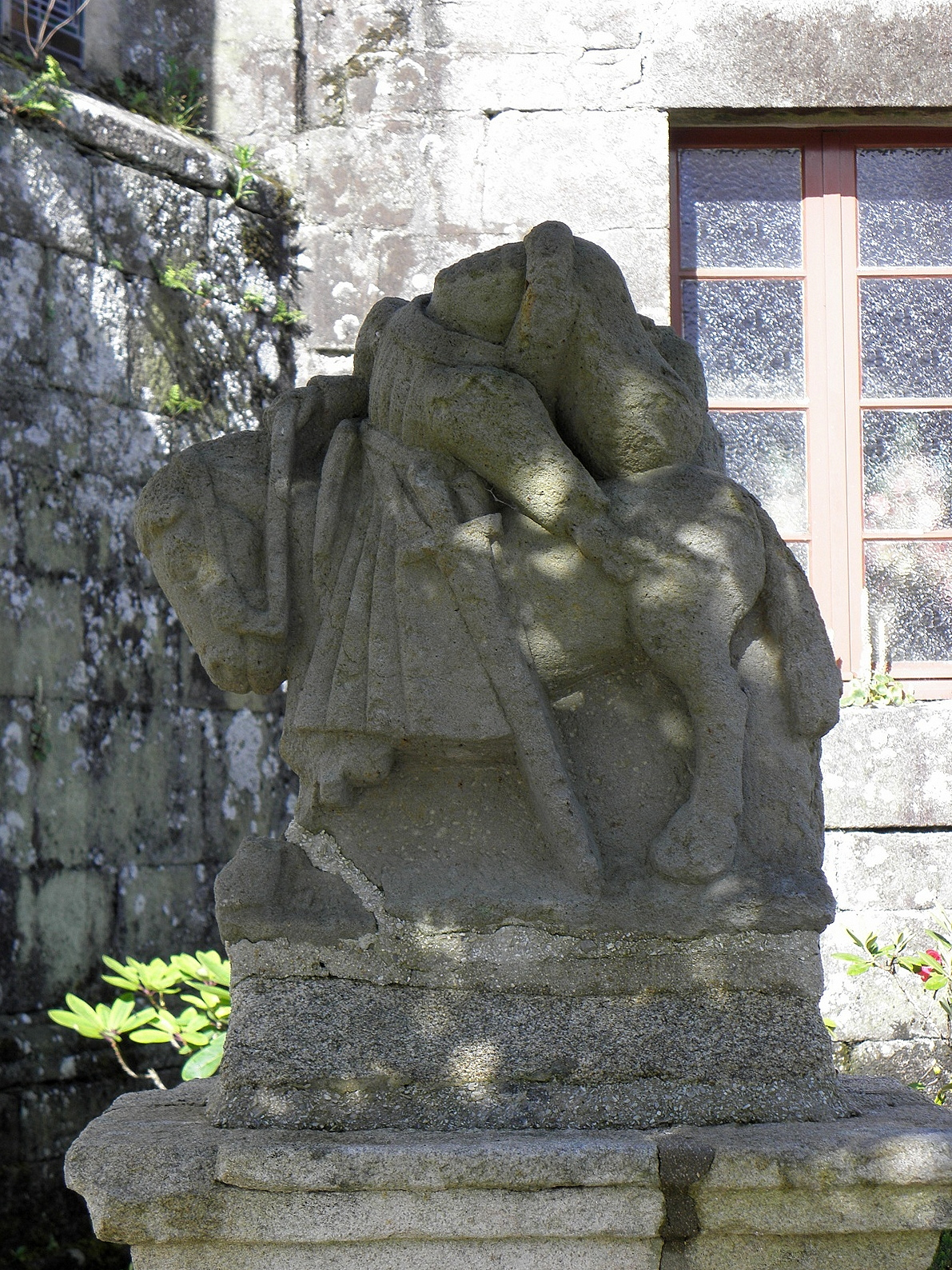
The dying cavalier. A sculpture dating to 1350

== Calvaries ==
Type of sculpture	Location	Description|Notes
Calvary	Laz	The calvary comprises three shafts being the central cross and two gibbets and a pietà by the Maître de Laz stands on the pedestal and dates to 1527. The calvary has been restored on several occasions. The statue of the bishop reversed with Saint Michael is a 15th-century creation and the crucifix and the "Christ lié" date to 1563. The sculptures of the Virgin Mary and John the Evangelist as well as that of the good robber are from the 14th century. The good robber's representation is a 16th-century work. In 1970 the calvary was moved to the church cemetery and the pietà was placed on a pedestal meant to represent an altar. The Laz pietà is of large dimensions. John the Evangelist, the Virgin Mary and Mary Magdalene are seated and Christ's body lies on their laps. He appears to be lying in fact on a catafalque made from three cushions. The Virgin Mary has her hands clasped in prayer and Mary Magdalene holds a pot of ointment from which she has just removed the lid. Some art historians believe Yves Fichaut to have been the Maître de Laz. The Laz pietà. The Maître de Laz's use of grés feldspathique enables him to carve with a high degree of detail. Note the pleats in the sleeves of the three participants and the carving of Christ's ribs Map showing location of Laz
Calvary	Saint-Hernin	Here the pietà follows that at Laz but John the Evangelist has lost his head and the Virgin Mary has lost part of her head. The Saint-Hernin pietà Map showing location Saint-Hernin
Calvary	Briec-de-l'Odet	Here the pietà has only the Virgin Mary and Jesus.
Calvary	Plourac'h	The pietà is kept inside the church and is polychromed.
Church statues	Plourac'h	The Maître de Laz executed statues for the interior of the Plourac'h Église Saint Jean Baptiste. These depict Saint Marguerite kneeling over the dragon she has slain, Patern, depicted as the first bishop of Vannes and Adrien in armour. They are polychromed. Map showing location Plourac'h
