= Saint-Hernin =

Saint-Hernin Sant-Hern
- Commune
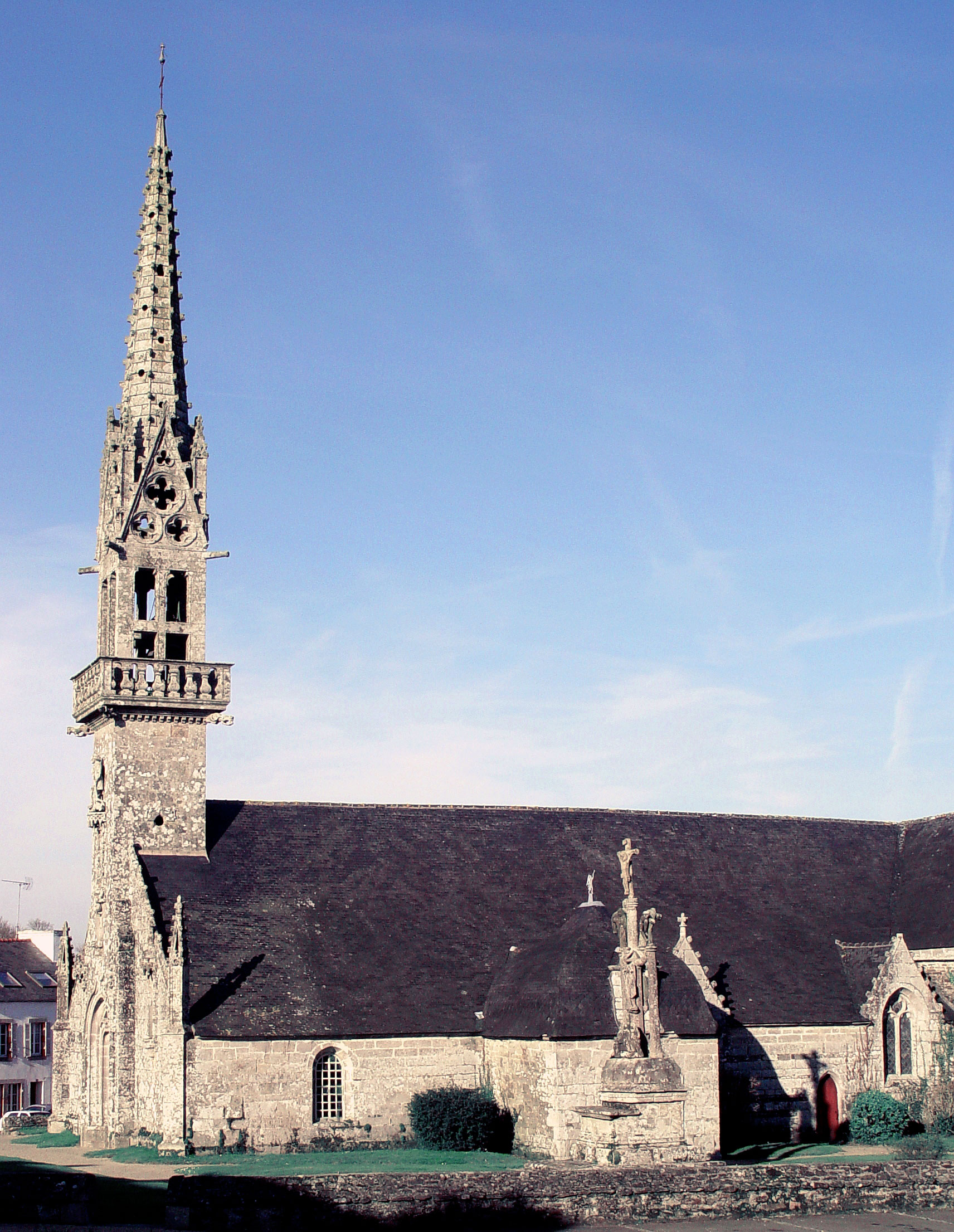
- The church in Saint-Hernin
- Location of Saint-Hernin
- Location within France Location within Brittany
- Coordinates: 48°13′06″N 3°37′59″W
- Country: France
- Region: Brittany
- Department: Finistère
- Arrondissement: Châteaulin
- Canton: Carhaix-Plouguer
- Intercommunality: Poher

Government
  - Mayor (2020–2026): Marie-Christine Jaouen
- Area^{1}: 29.29 km^{2} (11.31 sq mi)
- Highest elevation: 308 m (1,010 ft)
- Lowest elevation: 59 m (194 ft)
- Population (2023): 753
  - Density: 25.7/km^{2} (66.6/sq mi)
- Time zone: UTC+01:00 (CET)
  - Summer (DST): UTC+02:00 (CEST)
- INSEE/Postal code: 29250 /29270
- ^{1} French Land Register data, which excludes lakes, ponds, glaciers > 1 km^{2} (0.386 sq mi or 247 acres) and river estuaries.

Saint-Hernin (French pronunciation: [sɛ̃.t‿ɛʁnɛ̃]; Breton: Sant-Hern) is a commune in the Finistère department of Brittany in north-western France. The historian and librarian Georges Le Rider (1928-2014) was born in Saint-Hernin.

== Population ==
Inhabitants of Saint-Hernin are called in French Saint-Herninois.

Historical population

Year	Pop.	±% p.a.
1793	1,211	—
1800	1,797	+5.80%
1806	1,152	−7.14%
1821	1,150	−0.01%
1831	1,250	+0.84%
1836	1,347	+1.51%
1841	1,314	−0.49%
1846	1,356	+0.63%
1851	1,374	+0.26%
1856	1,350	−0.35%
1861	1,326	−0.36%
1866	1,456	+1.89%
1872	1,348	−1.28%
1876	1,351	+0.06%
1881	1,312	−0.58%
1886	1,433	+1.78%
1891	1,576	+1.92%
1896	1,653	+0.96%
1901	1,763	+1.30%

Year	Pop.	±% p.a.
1906	1,830	+0.75%
1911	1,860	+0.33%
1921	1,908	+0.26%
1926	1,905	−0.03%
1931	1,902	−0.03%
1936	1,706	−2.15%
1946	1,603	−0.62%
1954	1,308	−2.51%
1962	1,134	−1.77%
1968	956	−2.81%
1975	826	−2.07%
1982	765	−1.09%
1990	776	+0.18%
1999	752	−0.35%
2007	760	+0.13%
2012	750	−0.26%
2017	759	+0.24%
2023	753	−0.13%

Source: EHESS and INSEE (1968-2023)

== Geography ==
Saint-Hernin lies on the northern slope of the Montagnes Noires (french, Black Mountains). The canal de Nantes à Brest, which is the canalized river Hyères, forms the commune's northern border.

== Map ==
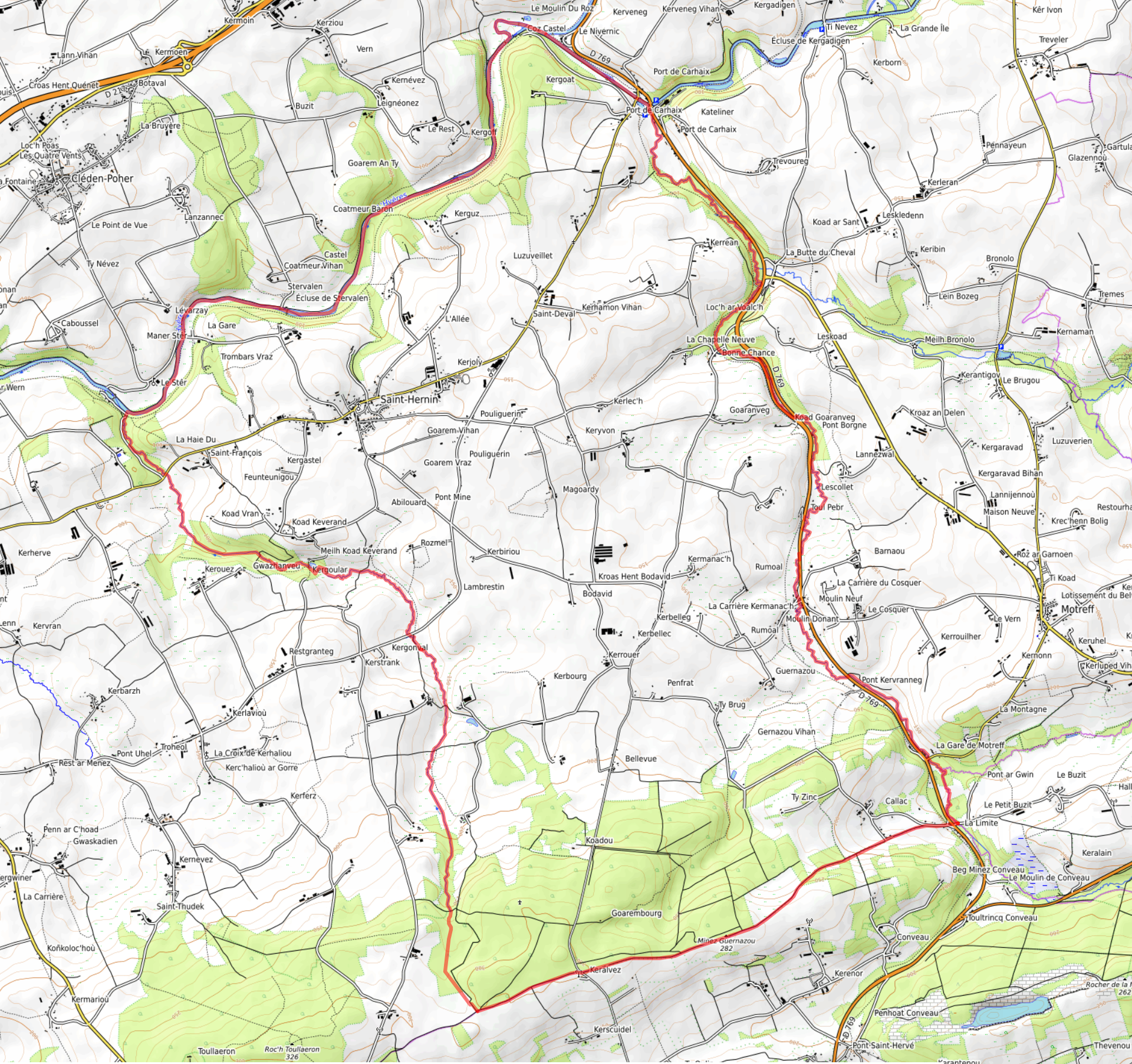
Topographic map

== See also ==
- Communes of the Finistère department
- Saint Hernin Parish close
- Listing of the works of the atelier of the Maître de Tronoën
- Listing of the works of the Maître de Laz
