= Cornish and Breton twin towns =

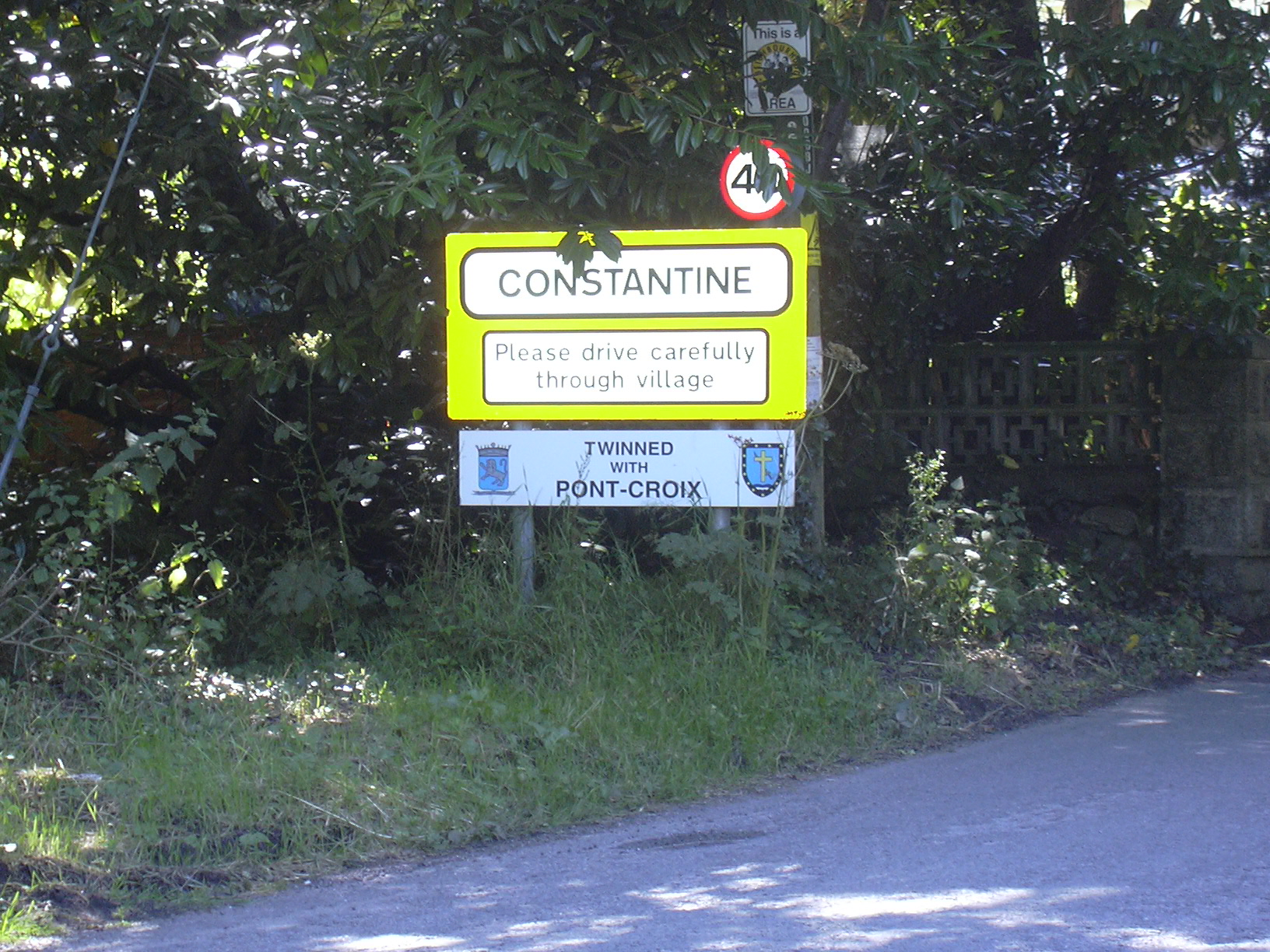
A twinning sign indicating the relationship between Pont-Croix and Constantine

The following table lists the names of Breton communities which have concluded town twinning agreements with communities in Cornwall:

Cornwall		Brittany	
Falmouth	Aberfal	Douarnenez	Douarnenez
Bodmin	Bosvena	Le Relecq-Kerhuon	Ar Releg-Kerhuon
St Buryan	Eglosveryan	Calan	Kalann
Saltash	Essa	Plougastel-Daoulas	Plougastell-Daoulaz
Millbrook	Govermelin	Plouider	Plouider
Hayle	Heyl	Pordic	Porzhig
Helston	Hellys	Pleumeur-Bodou	Pleuveur-Bodoù
Calstock	Kalstok	Saint-Thuriau	Sant-Turiav
Camborne	Kammbronn	Sainte-Anne-d'Auray	Santez-Anna-Wened
Callington	Kelliwik	Guipavas	Gwipavaz
St Germans	Lannaled	Plouguerneau	Plougerne
Feock	Lannfyek	Hôpital-Camfrout	An Ospital
Crantock	Lanngorrow	Carantec	Karanteg
Constantine	Lanngostentin	Pont-Croix	Pontekroaz
Launceston	Lannstevan	Plestin-les-Grèves	Plistin
St Erth	Lannudhno	Ploulec'h	Ploulec'h
St Just in Penwith	Lannust	Huelgoat	An Uhelgoad
Mabe	Lannvab	Primelin	Prevel
Looe	Logh	Quiberon	Kiberen
Lostwithiel	Lostwydhyel	Pleyber-Christ	Pleiber-Krist
The Lizard	Lysardh	Landévennec	Landevenneg
Liskeard	Lyskerrys	Quimperlé	Kemperle
Penryn	Pennrynn	Audierne	Gwaien
Penzance	Pennsans	Concarneau	Konk-Kerne
Torpoint	Penntorr	Bénodet	Benoded
Wadebridge	Ponswad	Langueux	Langaeg
St. Ives	Porth Ia	Camaret	Kameled
Bude	Porthbud	Ergué-Gabéric	An Erge-Vras
Cawsand	Porthbugh	Porspoder	Porspoder
Porthleven	Porthleven	Guissény	Gwiseni
Redruth	Resrudh	Plumergat	Pluvergad
Redruth	Resrudh	Meriasek	Meriadeg
St Neot	St Neot	Malguénac	Malgeneg
Stithians	Stedhyan	Ploërdut	Pleurdud
Storuay or Newquay	Tewynblustri	Dinard	Dinarzh
Truro	Truru	Morlaix	Montroulez

== See also ==
- Irish and Breton twin towns
- List of Welsh towns twinned with a Breton town
