= Irish and Breton twin towns =

The following table lists the names of Breton communities which have concluded town twinning agreements with communities in Ireland:

Ireland		Brittany	
Headford	Áth Cinn	Le Faouët	Ar Faoued
Athlone	Baile Átha Luain	Châteaubriant	Kastell-Briant
Ballyheigue	Baile Uí Thaidhg	Gosné	Goneg
Ballinamore	Béal an Átha Móir	Plouézec	Ploueg-ar-Mor
Ballinhassig	Béal Átha an Cheasaigh	Pleudaniel	Planiel
Ballyhaunis	Béal Átha hAmhnais	Guilers	Gwiler-Leon
Belturbet	Béal Tairbirt	Cavan	Kawan
Bantry	Beanntraí	Pont-l'Abbé	Pont an Abad
Crosshaven	Bun an Tabhairne	Pleumeur-Bodou	Pleuveur-Bodoù
Castlebar	Caisleán an Bharraigh	Auray	An Alre
Castlecomer	Caisleán an Chumair	Penvénan	Perwenan
Castlegregory	Caisleán Ghriaire	Saint-Colomban	Sant-Koulman
Carrick on Suir	Carraig na Siúire	Tregunc	Tregon
Westport	Cathair na Mart	Plougastel-Daoulas	Plougastell-Daoulaz
Cahersiveen	Cathair Saidhbhín	Pluvigner	Pleuwigner
Kanturk	Ceann Toirc	Rostrenen	Rostrenenn
Kilkee	Cill Chaoi	Plouhinec	Pleheneg
Kilgarvan	Cill Garbháin	Tréglamus	Treglañviz
Kilmacow	Cill Mhic Bhúith	Saint-Thurien	Sant-Turian
Killorglin	Cill Orglan	Plouha	Plouha
Kilrush	Cill Rois	Plouzané	Plouzane
Kinvara	Cinn Mhara	Locoal-Mendon	Lokoal-Mendon
Clifden	An Clochán	Sarzeau	Sarzav
Clonakilty	Cloich na Coillte	Châteaulin	Kastellin
Cobh	An Cóbh	Ploërmel	Ploermael
Carrick on Shannon	Cora Droma Rúisc	Cesson-Sévigné	Saozon-Sevigneg
Corofin	Cora Finne	Tonquédec	Tonkedeg
Mountbellew-Moylough	An Creagán-Maigh Locha	Elliant	Eliant
Drumshambo	Droim Seanbhó	Locquirec	Lokireg
Dundalk	Dún Dealgan	Rezé	Reudied
Dún Laoghaire	Dún Laoghaire	Brest	Brest
Dunmore, County Galway	Dún Mór (Gaillimh)	Querrien	Kerien
Dunmore East (Waterford)	An Dún Mór Thoir	Clohars-Carnoët	Kloar-Karnoed
Galway	Gaillimh	Lorient	An Oriant
Cork	Corcaigh	Rennes	Roazhon
Lahinch	An Leacht	Arzon	Arzhon-Rewiz
Wexford	Loch Garman	Couëron	Koeron
Macroom	Maigh Chromtha	Bubry	Bubri
Limerick	Luimneach	Quimper	Kemper
Fermoy	Mainistir Fhear Maí	Ploemeur	Plañvour
Mallow	Mala	Tréguier	Landreger
Waterford	Port Láirge	Saint-Herblain	Sant-Ervlan
Charleville, County Cork	Rath Luirc	Plouaret	Plouared
Ringaskiddy	Rinn an Scidígh	Hengoat	Hengoad
Skibbereen	An Sciobairín	Penmarch	Penmarc'h
Shannon	Sionainn	Guingamp	Gwengamp
Sligo	Sligeach	Crozon	Kraozon
An Spidéal	An Spidéal	Plougrescant	Plougouskant
Millstreet	Sráid an Mhuilinn	Pommerit-le-Vicomte	Pañvrid-ar-Beskont
Roundwood	An Tochar	Spézet	Speied
Monivea	Mhuine an Mheá	Tréméven, Finistère	Tremeven-Kemperle

== See also ==
- List of Welsh towns twinned with a Breton town
