= Sisters of the Perpetual Adoration =

The Sisters of the Perpetual Adoration are a Roman Catholic religious congregation founded at Quimper, Brittany, by Father François-Marie Langrez (1787–1862).

In early youth Langrez was an apprentice rope-maker, but he began his classical studies at sixteen, and was ordained on 19 December 1812. In December 1821, he conceived the first idea of the work he subsequently founded. Two poor homeless little girls crossed his path. He entrusted them to Marguerite Le Maître, a domestic servant. Other orphans were found and sheltered. In 1826, Marguerite's home contained an oratory and was provided with a dormitory holding thirty beds. Three years later she received her first two co-labourers, and on 21 November 1829, the first chapel of the institute was opened. In 1832, Mlle Olympe de Moelien, in whose family Marguerite Le Maitre had been a servant when she began her charitable work, entered the little society, and was made superioress on 10 March 1833. On 20 January 1835, Mère Olympe and her companions first put on the religious habit. In September 1835 a tentative rule of life was drawn up by Father Langrez. In March 1836, the first sisters made their vows. On 27 March 1837, Sister Marguerite Le Maître died. Adoration of the Blessed Sacrament which was begun in March 1836, did not become perpetual, day and night, till 1843, eight days after the death of Mère Olympe, who left after her a great reputation for sanctity.

At that time the community numbered 11 choir sisters, 4 postulants, and had charge of 70 children.

In 1845 their rule was approved by Mgr Graveran, Bishop of Quimper. A little later they were recognized by the Government under the title of Sisters of the Perpetual Adoration. On 10 May 1851, a house was founded at Recouvrance, transferred on 28 October 1856 to Coat-ar-Guéven, near Brest, France.

Membership of the congregation is now reduced to 16, all above pension age, living in four communities within the French region of Finistère, with two houses in Brest, one in Quimper, and the motherhouse in Guipavas. The social and medical institutions that were founded by them are now in the care of foundations with lay participation.
