= List of Welsh towns twinned with a Breton town =

The following table lists the names of Welsh communities which have concluded town twinning agreements with communities in Brittany:

Wales		Brittany	
Aberystwyth		Saint-Brieuc	Sant-Brieg
Brecon	Aberhonddu	Gouesnou	Gouenoù
Caernarfon		Landerneau	Landerne
Cardiff	Caerdydd	Nantes	Naoned
Carmarthen	Caerfyrddin	Lesneven	
Cowbridge	Y Bontfaen	Clisson	Klison
Crickhowell	Crucywel	Scaër	Skaer
Crymych		Plomelin	Ploveilh
Cwmaman		Pouldergat	Pouldregad
Dolgellau		Guérande	Gwenrann
Fishguard	Abergwaun	Loctudy	Loktudi
Gorseinon		Ploërmel	Ploermael
Govilon	Gofilon	Missillac	Merzhelieg
Gowerton	Tre-gŵyr	La Gacilly	Gazilieg
Holywell	Treffynnon	Saint-Grégoire	Sant Gregor
Kidwelly	Cydweli	Saint-Jacut-de-la-Mer	Sant-Yagu-an-Enez
Llanbradach		Ploubezre	Ploubêr
Llandeilo		Le Conquet	Konk-Leon
Llandovery	Llanymddyfri	Pluguffan	Pluguen
Llandybie	Llandybïe	Plonéour-Lanvern	Ploneour-Lanwern
Llandysul		Plogonnec	Plogoneg
Llanidloes		Derval	Derwal
Llantwit Major	Llanilltud Fawr	Le Pouliguen	Ar Poulgwenn
Machen		Sautron	Saotron
Newcastle Emlyn	Castell Newydd Emlyn	Plonévez-Porzay	Plonevez-Porzhe
Newport, Pembrokeshire	Trefdraeth	Plouguin	Plougin
Penarth		Saint-Pol-de-Léon	Kastell-Paol
Pencoed	Pen-coed	Plouzané	Plouzane
Pontardawe		Locminé	Logunec'h
Porthcawl		Saint-Sébastien-sur-Loire	Sant-Sebastian-an-Enk
Presteigne and Norton	Llanandras a Norton	Ligné	Legneg
Radyr and Morganstown	Radyr a Morganstown	Saint-Philbert-de-Grand-Lieu	Sant-Filberzh-Deaz
Ruthin	Rhuthun	Briec	Brieg
St Asaph	Llanelwy	Bégard	Bear
St Clears	Sanclêr	Peillac	Paolieg
St Dogmaels	Llandudoch	Trédarzec	Tredarzeg
Tredegar		Orvault	Orvez
Tregaron		Plouvien	
Whitland	Hendy-gwyn ar Daf	Pipriac	Presperieg

== See also ==
- Irish and Breton twin towns
