= Brest Métropole =

Coordinates: 48.3900°N 4.4869°W

- Métropole
- Location of Brest Métropole in Finistère
- Interactive map of Brest Métropole
- Country: France
- Region: Brittany
- Department: Finistère
- No. of communes: {{{nbcomm}}}
- Established: January 1, 2015

Government
  - President (2020–2026): François Cuillandre (PS)
- Area: 218.37 km^{2} (84.31 sq mi)
- Population (2019): 215,367
  - Density: 986.25/km^{2} (2,554.4/sq mi)
- Website: www.brest.fr

Brest Métropole (French pronunciation: [bʁɛst metʁɔpɔl]) is the métropole, an intercommunal structure, centred on the city of Brest. It is located in the Finistère department, in the Brittany region, western France. It was created in January 2015, replacing the previous Communauté urbaine de Brest. Its population was 215,367 in 2019, of which 142,555 in Brest proper.

== History ==
The Urban Community was founded in 1973. On January 1, 2015, the Métropole replaced the Urban Community in accordance with a law of January 2014.

== Member communes ==
The Brest Métropole consists of the following 8 communes:

- Bohars
- Brest
- Gouesnou
- Guilers
- Guipavas
- Plougastel-Daoulas
- Plouzané
- Le Relecq-Kerhuon

== Administration ==
The Metropolitan Council consists of 70 members, one of them being the president, currently François Cuillandre, the mayor of Brest.
