= Canton of Guipavas =

Coordinates: 48.44°N 4.40°W

The canton of Guipavas is an administrative division of the Finistère department, northwestern France. Its borders were modified at the French canton reorganisation which came into effect in March 2015. Its seat is in Guipavas.

It consists of the following communes:

1. Guipavas
2. Plougastel-Daoulas
3. Le Relecq-Kerhuon
