= Bohars =

Bohars Boc'harzh
- Commune
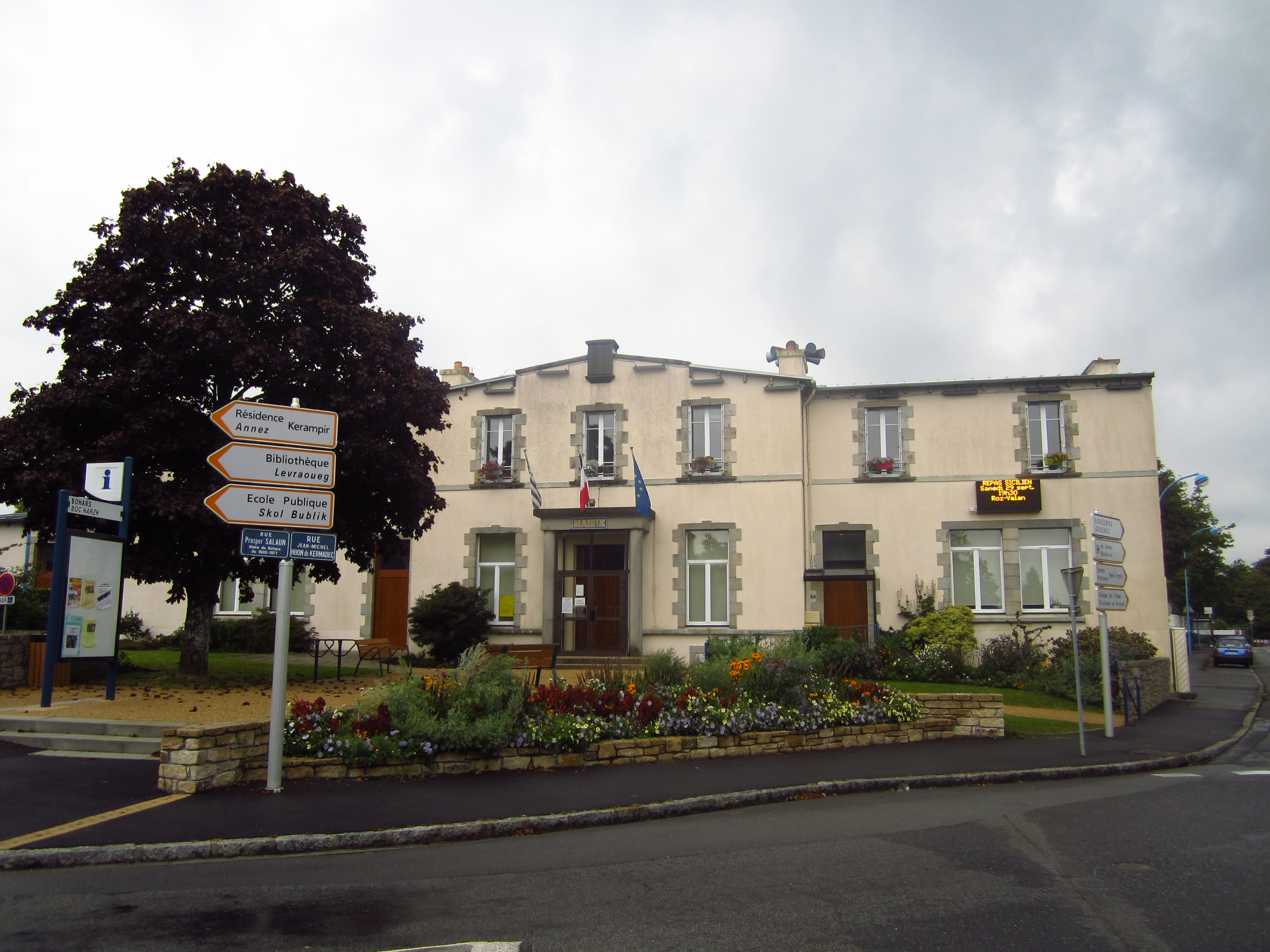
- The town hall in Bohars

- Coat of arms
- Location of Bohars
- Location within France Location within Brittany
- Coordinates: 48°25′49″N 4°30′44″W
- Country: France
- Region: Brittany
- Department: Finistère
- Arrondissement: Brest
- Canton: Brest-4
- Intercommunality: Brest Métropole

Government
  - Mayor (2020–2026): Armel Gourvil
- Area^{1}: 7.27 km^{2} (2.81 sq mi)
- Highest elevation: 93 m (305 ft)
- Lowest elevation: 3 m (9.8 ft)
- Population (2023): 3,727
  - Density: 513/km^{2} (1,330/sq mi)
- Time zone: UTC+01:00 (CET)
  - Summer (DST): UTC+02:00 (CEST)
- INSEE/Postal code: 29011 /29820
- ^{1} French Land Register data, which excludes lakes, ponds, glaciers > 1 km^{2} (0.386 sq mi or 247 acres) and river estuaries.

Bohars (French pronunciation: [bɔaʁ]; Breton: Boc'harzh) is a commune in the Finistère department of Brittany north-western France.

Bohars is twinned with the village of Tarporley in England, United Kingdom

== Population ==
Inhabitants of Bohars are called Boharsiens in French.

Historical population

Year	Pop.	±% p.a.
1793	582	—
1800	734	+3.37%
1806	747	+0.29%
1821	749	+0.02%
1831	787	+0.50%
1836	865	+1.91%
1841	822	−1.01%
1846	804	−0.44%
1851	843	+0.95%
1856	842	−0.02%
1861	695	−3.76%
1866	950	+6.45%
1872	836	−2.11%
1876	826	−0.30%
1881	882	+1.32%
1886	835	−1.09%
1891	910	+1.74%
1896	866	−0.99%
1901	901	+0.80%

Year	Pop.	±% p.a.
1906	859	−0.95%
1911	891	+0.73%
1921	798	−1.10%
1926	734	−1.66%
1931	757	+0.62%
1936	740	−0.45%
1946	854	+1.44%
1954	896	+0.60%
1962	840	−0.80%
1968	909	+1.32%
1968	909	+0.00%
1975	1,361	+5.94%
1982	2,887	+11.34%
1990	3,043	+0.66%
1999	3,170	+0.46%
2007	3,305	+0.52%
2012	3,512	+1.22%
2017	3,458	−0.31%
2023	3,727	+1.26%

Source: INSEE and EHESS

== See also ==
- Communes of the Finistère department
