= Plougastel-Daoulas Parish Close =

Coordinates: 48.3739°N 4.3701°W

The parish close of Plougastel-Daoulas in northwestern France comprises the Saint Pierre church, an elaborate calvary and a war memorial. The calvary at Plougastel-Daoulas is a listed historical monument since 1889.

== The parish church of Saint-Pierre ==
The church was built in 1870 and designed by Joseph Bigot. Badly damaged by Allied bombing on 22 and 23 August 1944 during the push to capture Brest it was restored and partially rebuilt and re-commissioned in 1950. A new master altar made from Mayenne marble was executed by Dom de Laborde, a monk from Solesmes Abbey, and consecrated on 2 September 1957.

Notable furnishings in the church include

== The Rosary altarpiece ==
This can be seen in the south transept area and was executed by the Brest sculptor Jean Berthouloux in 1654 to 1656. Four twisted columns support a pediment with a niche holding a sculpted study of Sainte Anne and her daughter the Virgin Mary. The central panel of the altarpiece has the 15 medallions, painted and in high-relief which traditionally form part of Rosary altarpieces and in niches in the base are statues of Christ holding a book and Gamaliel.

== The altarpiece of the Saint Pierre altar ==
This 17th-century altarpiece also has four twisted columns and an arched pediment with a niche holding a statue of Christ holding a globe. In the centre is a statue of Saint Pierre and seven polychrome medallions. Further panels on the column's socles have depictions of the Angel Gabriel and Saint Mark on the right side and the Virgin of the Annunciation and Saint Matthew on the left. These sculptures are also by Jean Berthouloux.

== The Notre Dame de Pitié altarpiece ==
This altarpiece dates to 1651 and panelling has a depiction of the crowning of the Virgin Mary in the centre.

== Baptismal fonts ==
These date to the 16th century and came from a church at Meilars. The basin is decorated with six carved panels.

== Stoup ==
The church has a 1715 stoup in kersanton stone with godroons carved on the sides.

== Stations of the Cross ==
The church has a "chemin de croix" dating to the 20th century by an artist called des Abbayes.

== Notre Dame de Pitié ==
See gallery of images below.

== War Memorial ==
The Plougastel-Daoulas war memorial was designed by the Quimper architect Charles Chaussepied, with sculptural work by Derrien and Joseph Gautier.

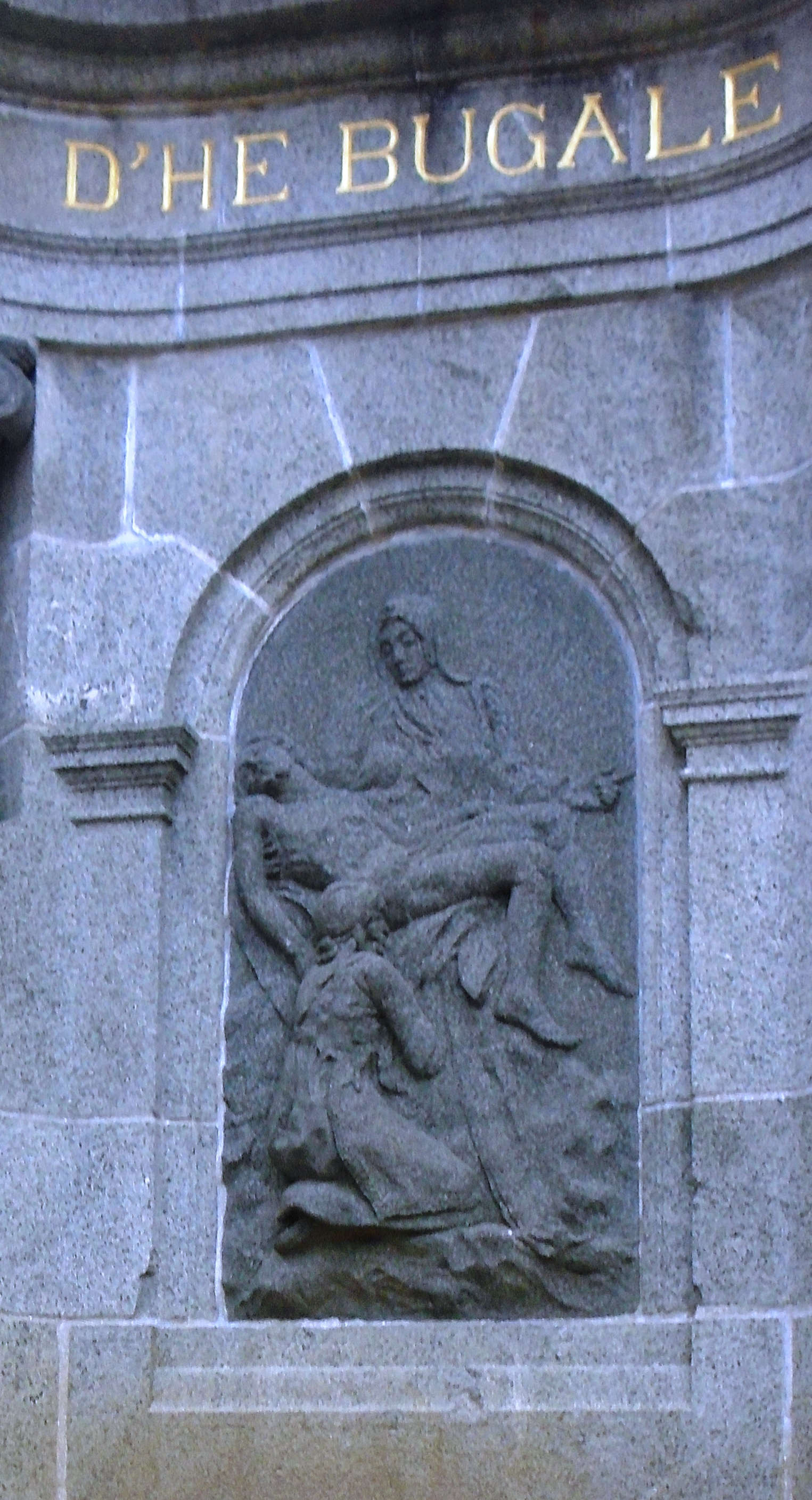
One of the reliefs on the Plougastel-Daoulas War Memorial

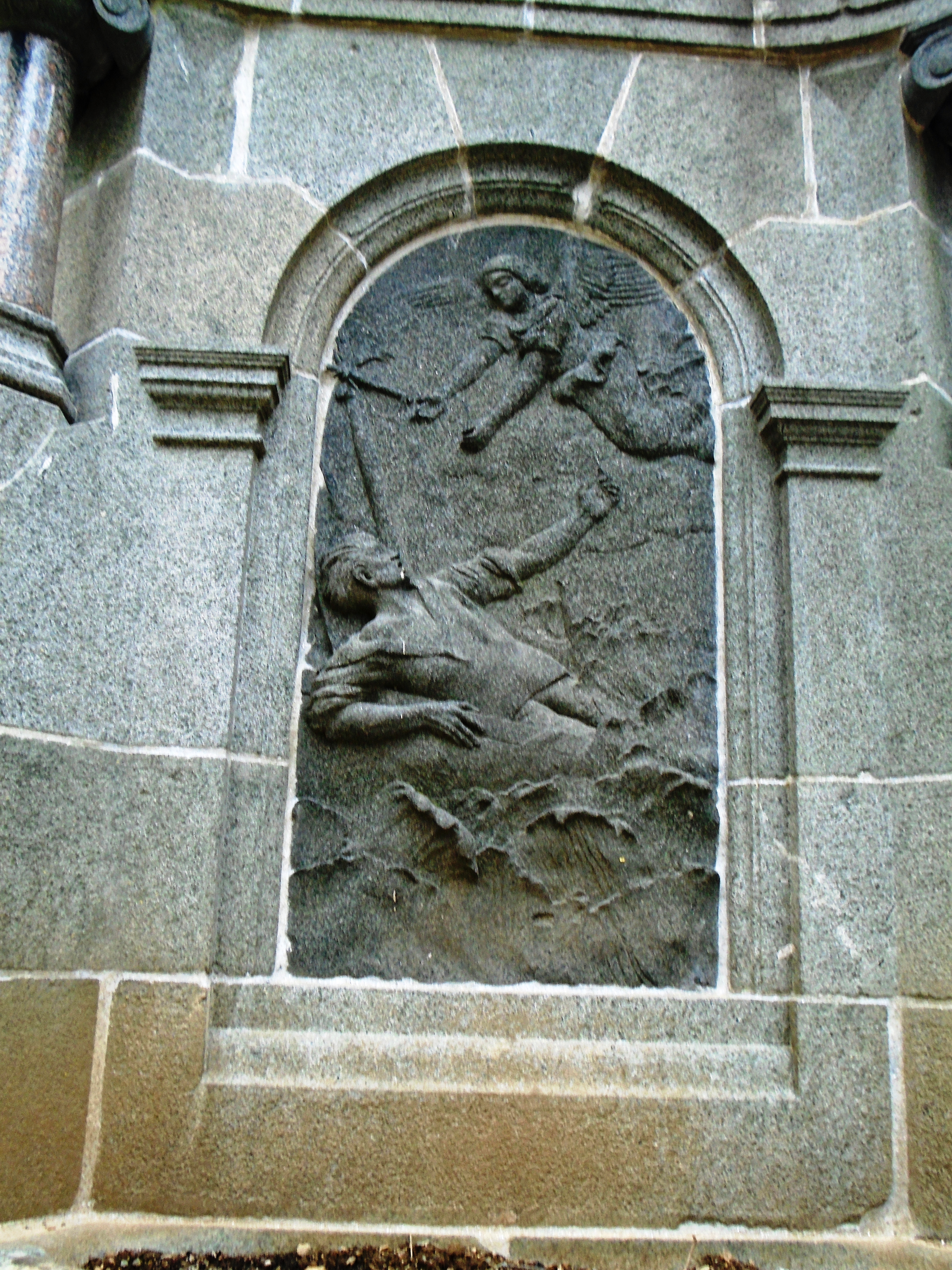
Another of the reliefs on the Plougastel-Daoulas War Memorial

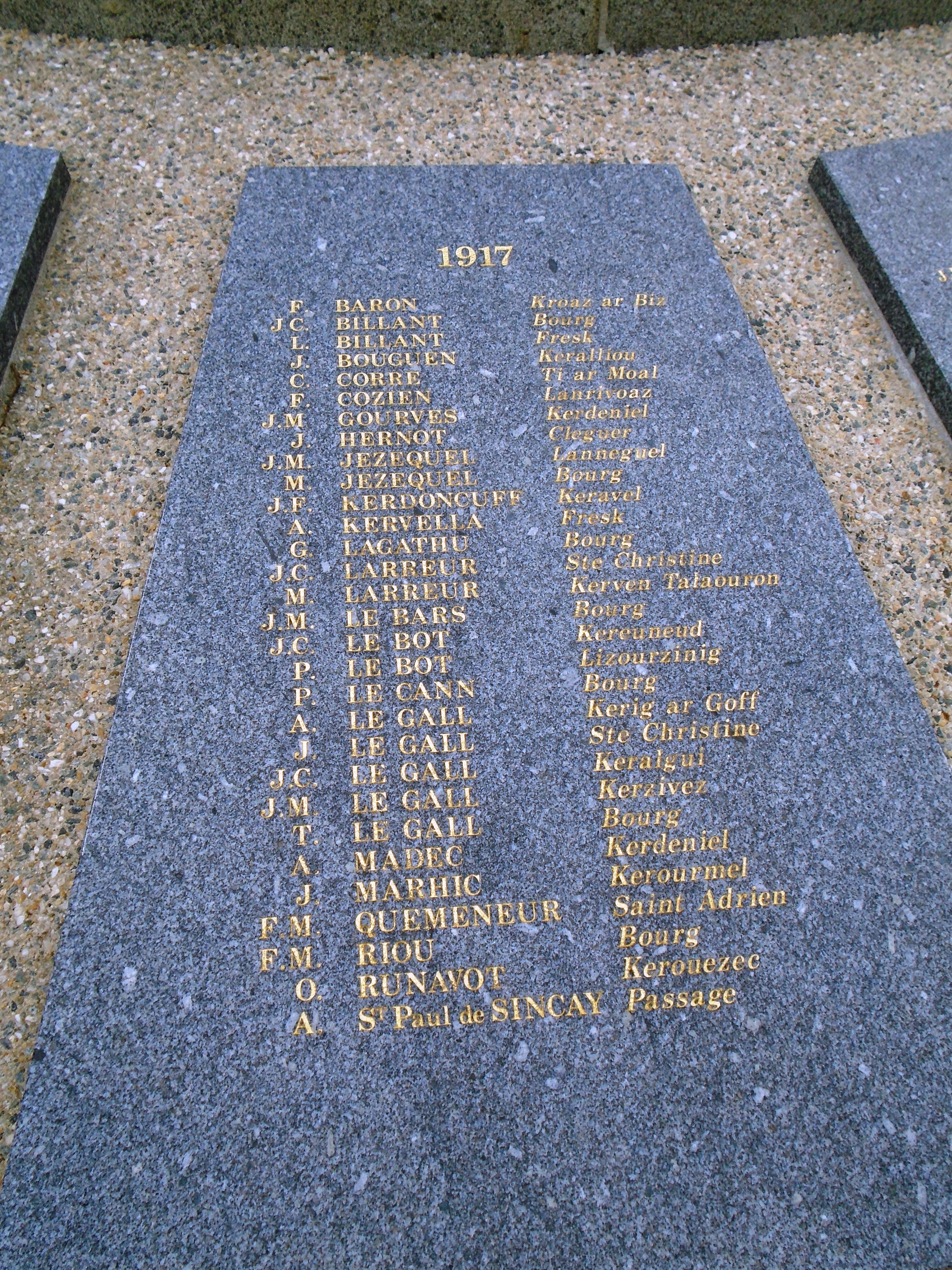
List of names by the Plougastel-Daoulas War Memorial

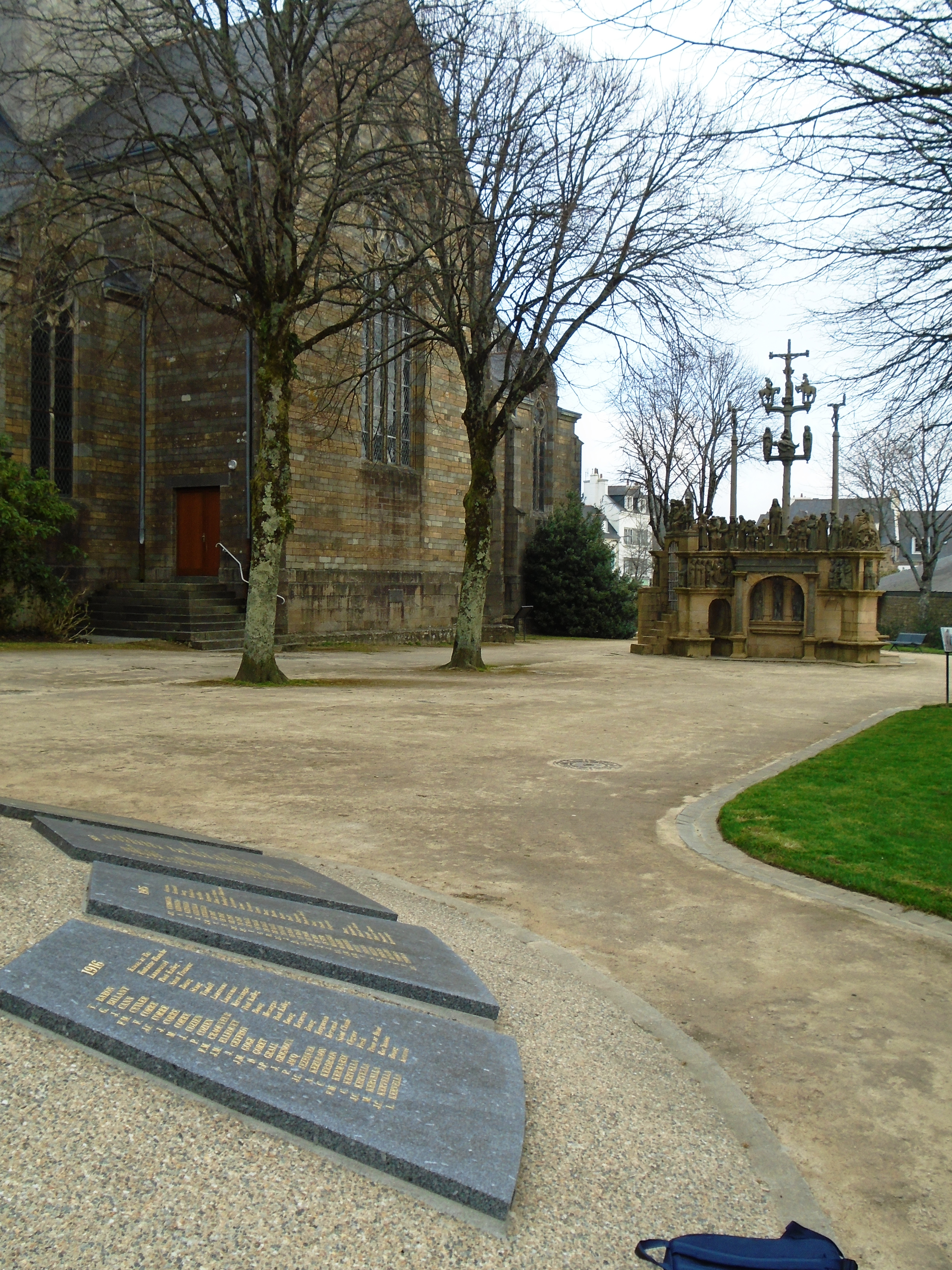
A view across to the Calvary from the Plougastel-Daoulas War Memorial

== The ossuary ==
The ossuary is located in the cemetery opposite the church and was moved there from Cloître-Pleyben in 1954. It dates to 1657 and bears the signature of Yvon Deniel. In the 17th century the parish close had an ossuary dedicated to Sainte Anne but this was pulled down when the church was rebuilt in 1870. The ossuary is decorated with carvings of skulls and bones.

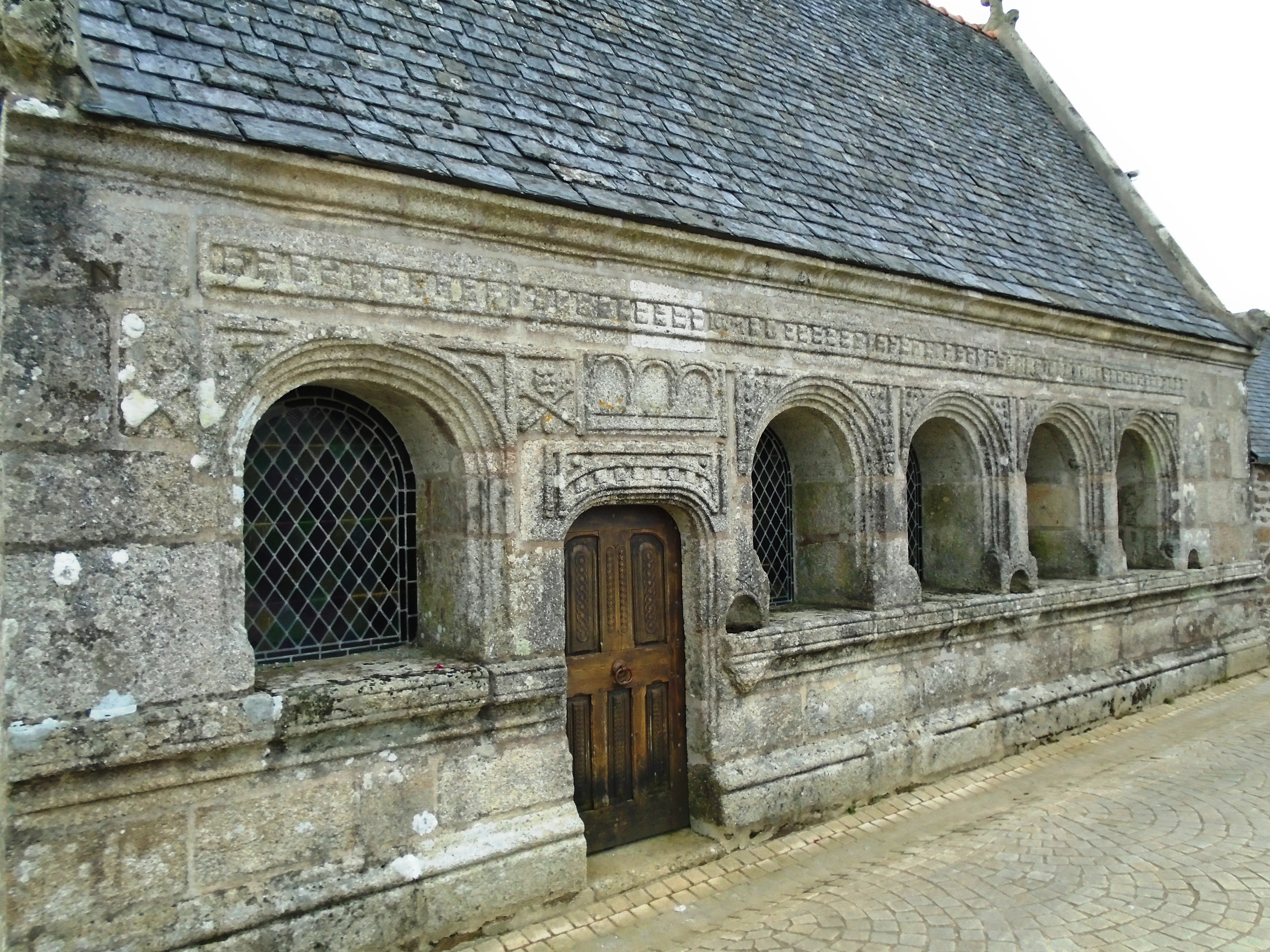
The ossuary

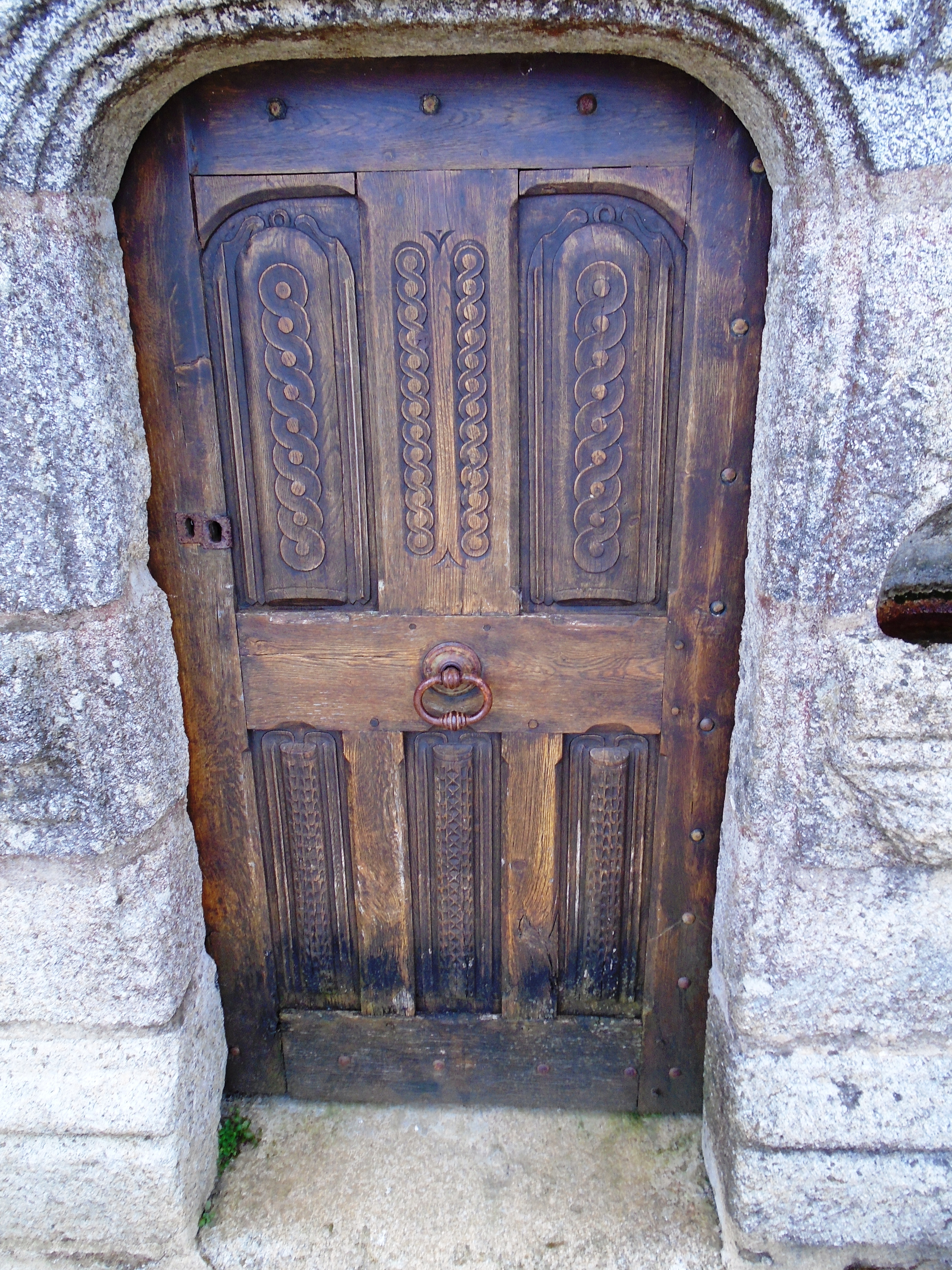
One of the ossuary doors

== Gallery of images ==
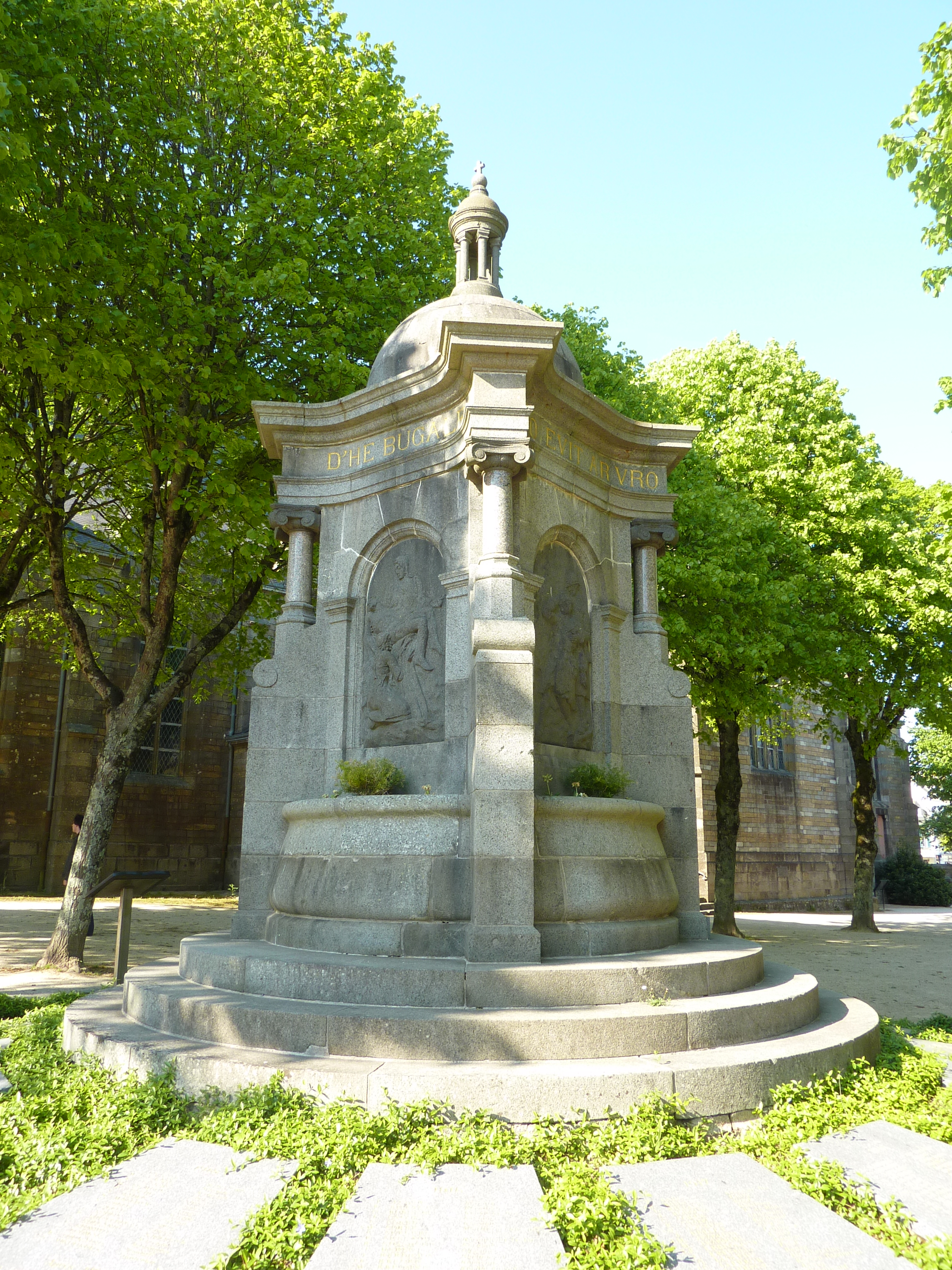
The war memorial

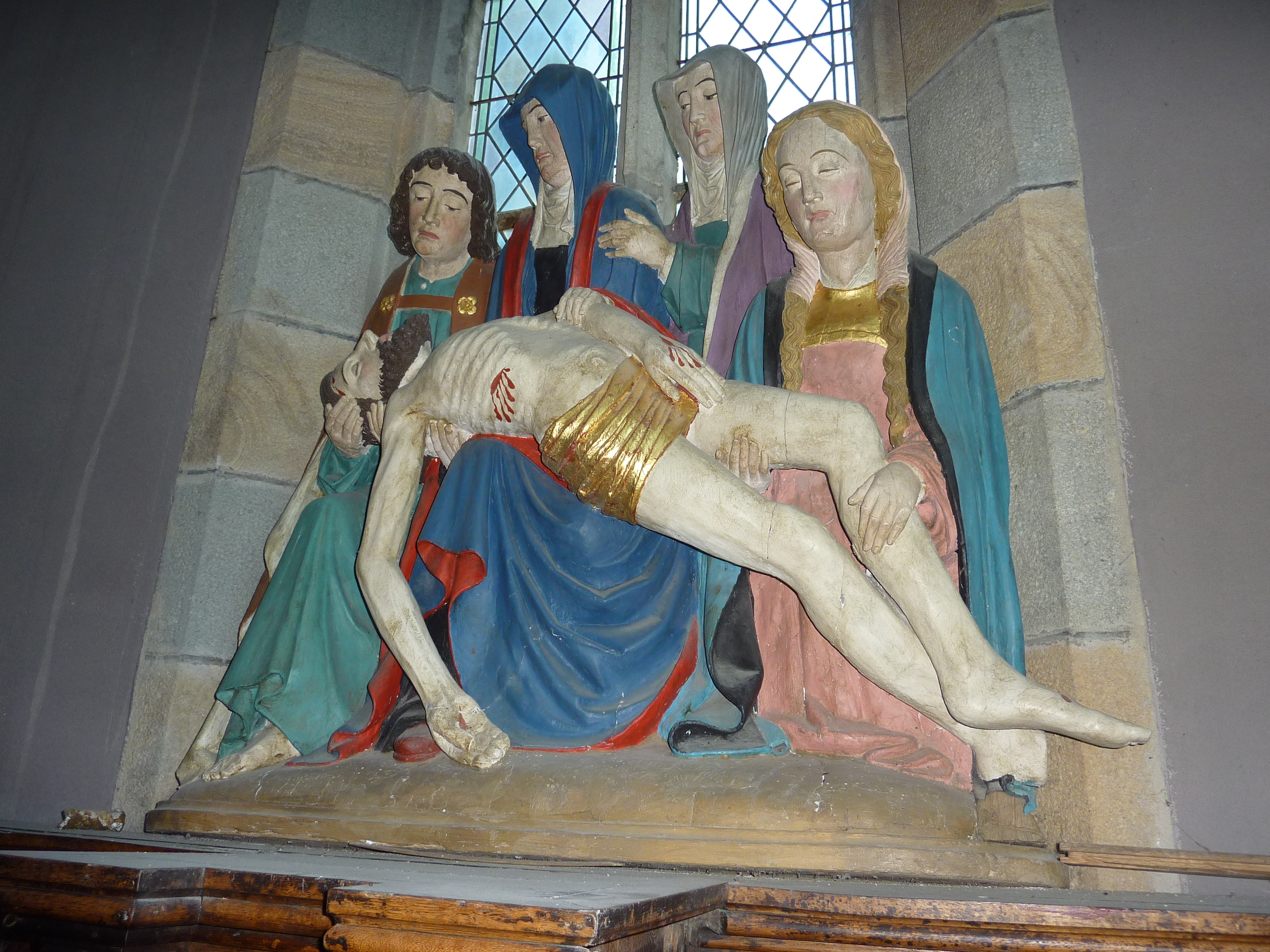
"The descent from the Cross". A 15th-century polychromed woodcarving. The Virgin Mary is supported by a female saint as the dead Christ lays across her knees. At her side is John the Evangelist and Mary Magdalene.

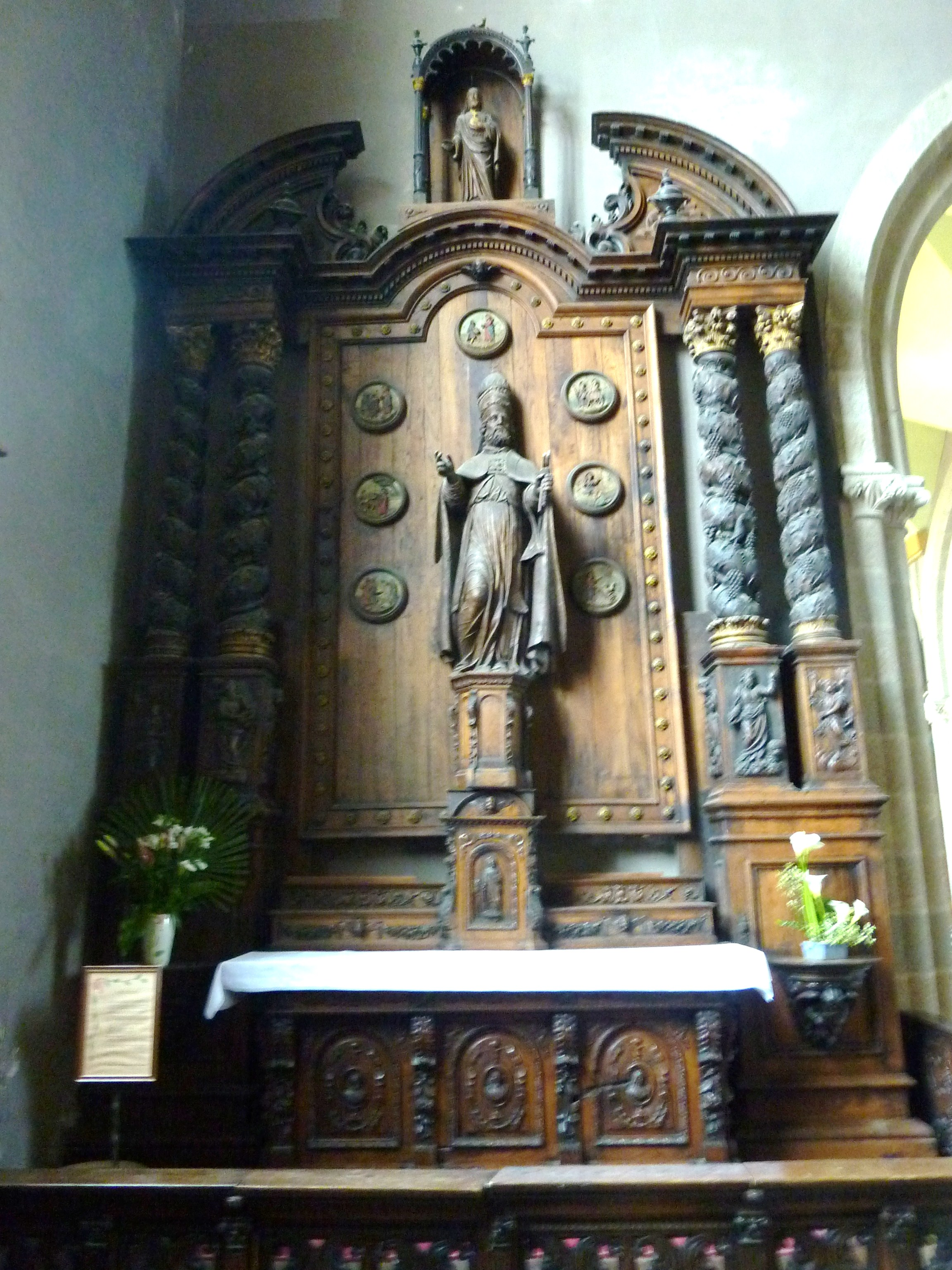
The Saint Pierre altarpiece

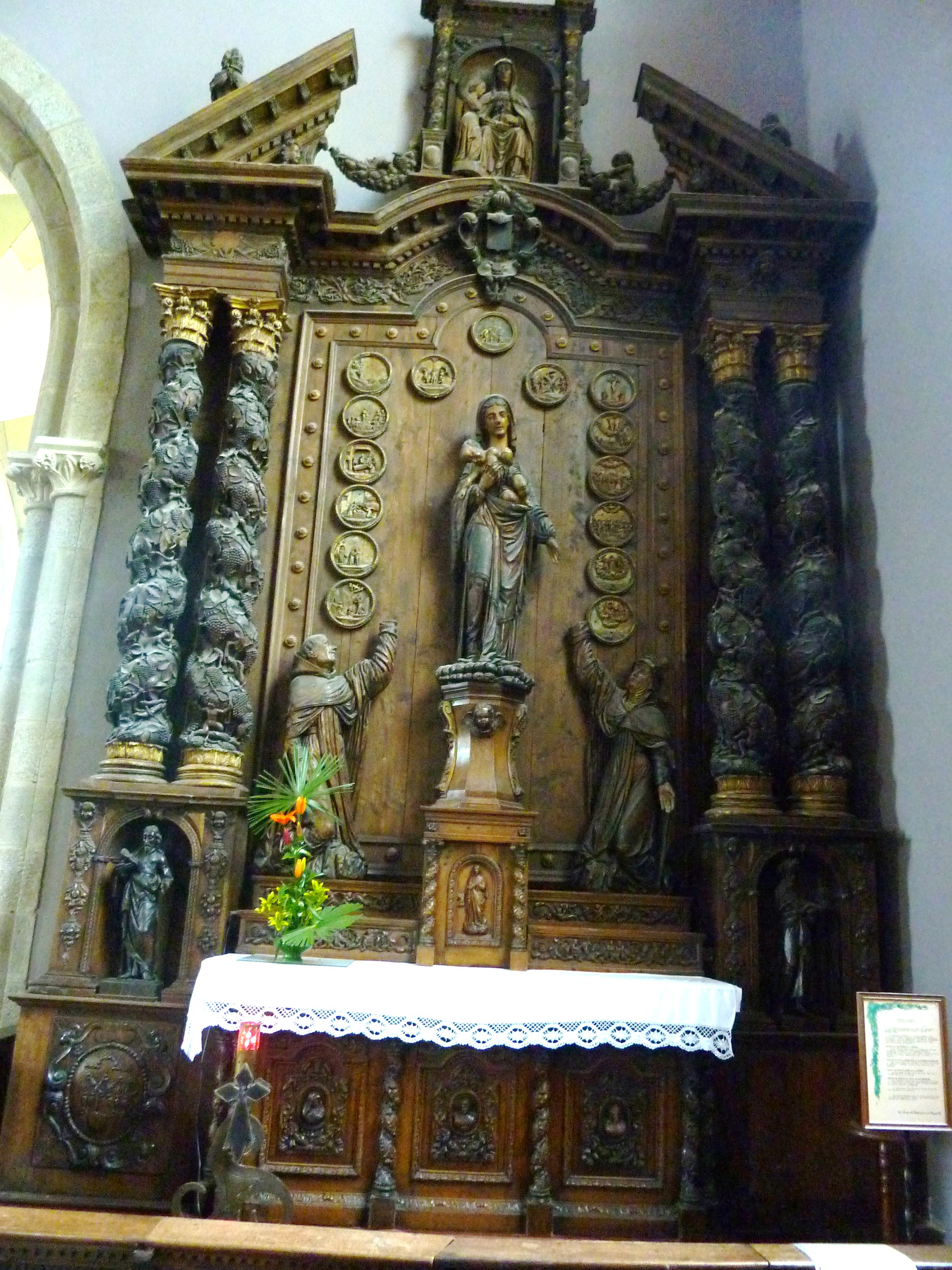
The "Rosary" altarpiece

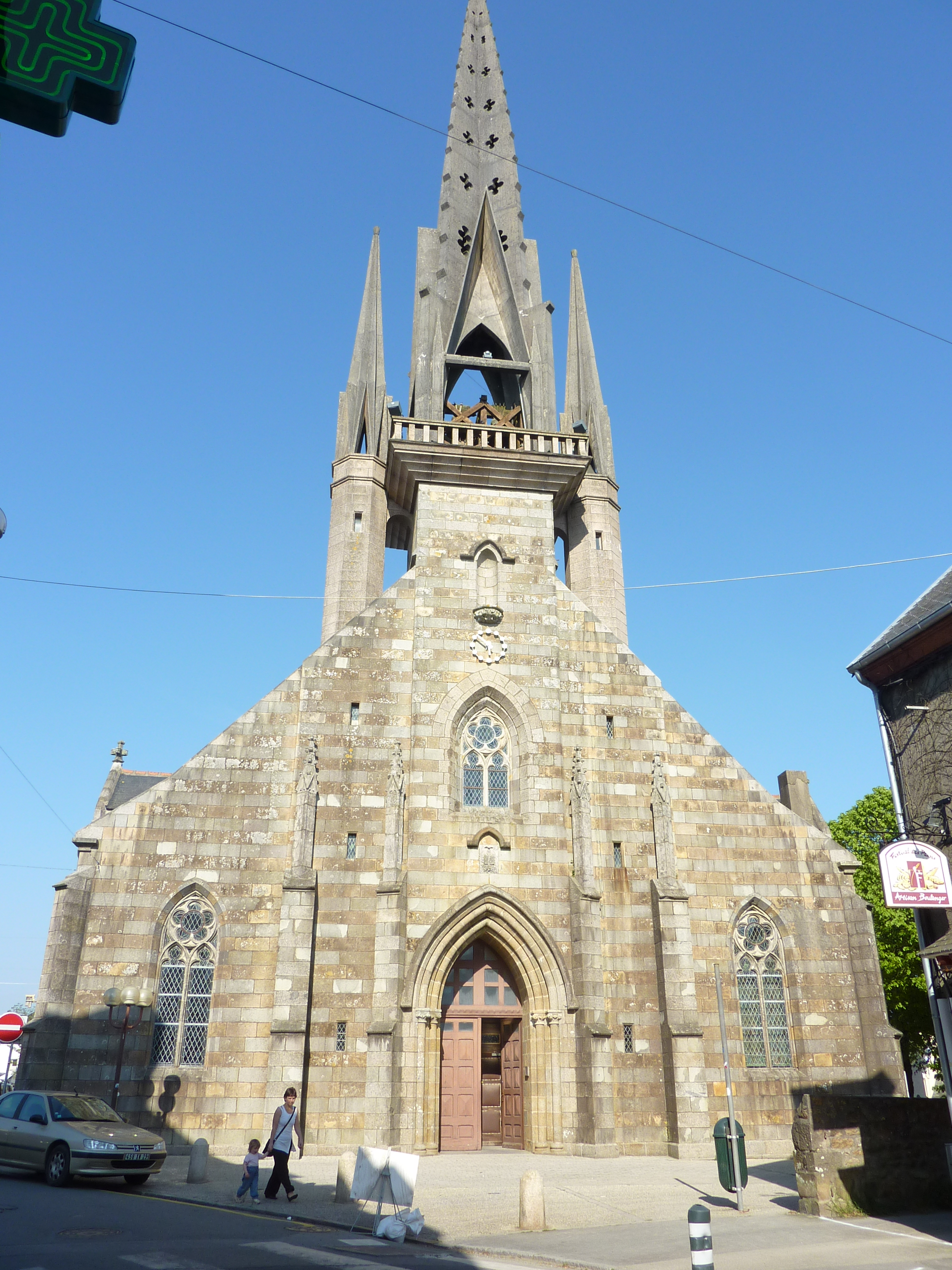
The front of the church

== Recommended reading ==
"Sculpteurs sur pierre en Basse-Bretagne. Les Ateliers du XVe au XVIIe Siècle" by Emmanuelle LeSeac'h. Published by Presses Universitaires de Rennes. ISBN 978-2-7535-3309-7.

Yves-Pascal Castel. "Guide des sept grands calvaires bretons / Ar seizh kalvar braz" published August 2005 ISSN 1148-8824.

Léon Le Berre. "Coup d’œil sur Plougastel-Daoulas" L'Ouest-Éclair, édition de Nantes, no 14892, 18 August 1937.

FR3. "Le calvaire de Plougastel-Daoulas" L'Ouest en Mémoire, 6 April 2004.

Victor-Henri DEBIDOUR, "Grands Calvaires de Bretagne". Éditions d'Art Jos Le Doaré. 1998. ISBN 2-855-43-191-3
