= Gouesnou =

Gouesnou Gouenoù
- Commune
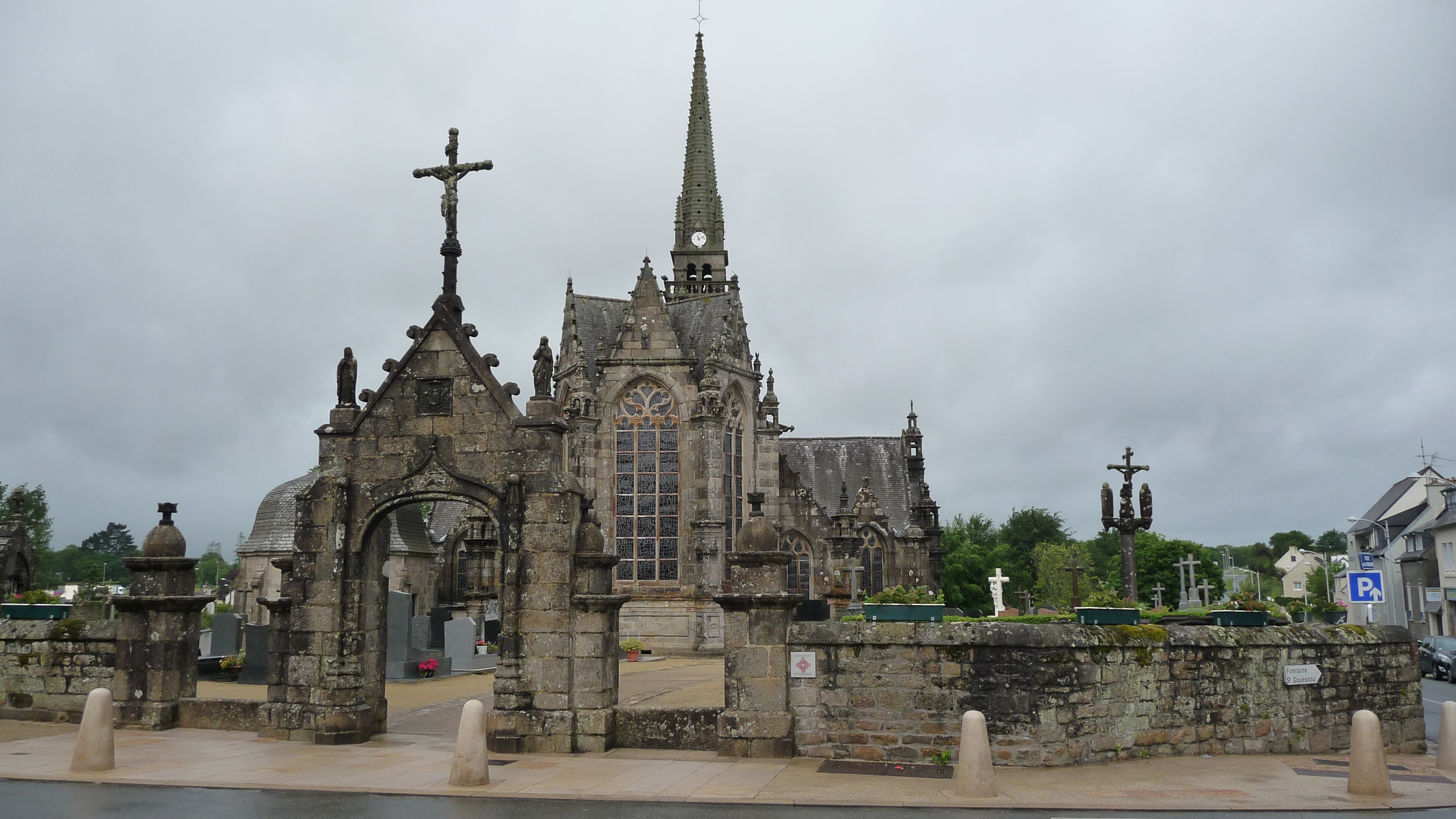
- The church in Gouesnou

- Coat of arms
- Location of Gouesnou
- Location within France Location within Brittany
- Coordinates: 48°27′16″N 4°27′48″W
- Country: France
- Region: Brittany
- Department: Finistère
- Arrondissement: Brest
- Canton: Brest-4
- Intercommunality: Brest Métropole

Government
  - Mayor (2020–2026): Stéphane Roudaut
- Area^{1}: 12.08 km^{2} (4.66 sq mi)
- Highest elevation: 103 m (338 ft)
- Lowest elevation: 58 m (190 ft)
- Population (2023): 6,501
  - Density: 538.2/km^{2} (1,394/sq mi)
- Time zone: UTC+01:00 (CET)
  - Summer (DST): UTC+02:00 (CEST)
- INSEE/Postal code: 29061 /29850
- ^{1} French Land Register data, which excludes lakes, ponds, glaciers > 1 km^{2} (0.386 sq mi or 247 acres) and river estuaries.

Gouesnou (French pronunciation: [ɡwenu]; Breton: Gouenoù) is a commune in the Finistère department of Brittany in north-western France.

== International relations ==
Gouesnou is a satellite town of Brest. It is twinned with the town of Brecon in Powys, mid Wales, enabling cultural exchanges to take place between these two Celtic regions. A new street in Brecon, passing the bus station, is named Heol Gouesnou; it follows the track of the disused Brecon and Neath Railway.

== Geography ==
The Penfeld River has its source in this commune.

== Population ==
Inhabitants of Gouesnou are known in French as Gouesnousiens.

Historical population

Year	Pop.	±% p.a.
1793	1,153	—
1800	1,191	+0.46%
1806	1,327	+1.82%
1821	1,264	−0.32%
1831	1,525	+1.89%
1836	1,597	+0.93%
1841	1,515	−1.05%
1846	1,509	−0.08%
1851	1,514	+0.07%
1856	1,454	−0.81%
1861	1,425	−0.40%
1866	1,479	+0.75%
1872	1,494	+0.17%
1876	1,478	−0.27%
1881	1,474	−0.05%
1886	1,417	−0.79%
1891	1,462	+0.63%
1896	1,511	+0.66%
1901	1,390	−1.66%

Year	Pop.	±% p.a.
1906	1,394	+0.06%
1911	1,424	+0.43%
1921	1,411	−0.09%
1926	1,382	−0.41%
1931	1,305	−1.14%
1936	1,316	+0.17%
1946	1,528	+1.50%
1954	1,829	+2.27%
1962	2,141	+1.99%
1968	2,543	+2.91%
1975	3,040	+2.58%
1982	4,061	+4.22%
1990	5,417	+3.67%
1999	6,042	+1.22%
2007	6,228	+0.38%
2012	5,982	−0.80%
2017	6,116	+0.44%
2023	6,501	+1.02%

Source: EHESS and INSEE (1968-2023)

== Breton language ==
In 2008, 8.32% of primary-school children attended bilingual schools, where Breton language is taught alongside French.

== See also ==
- Communes of the Finistère department
