= Guilers =

Guilers Gwiler-Leon
- Commune
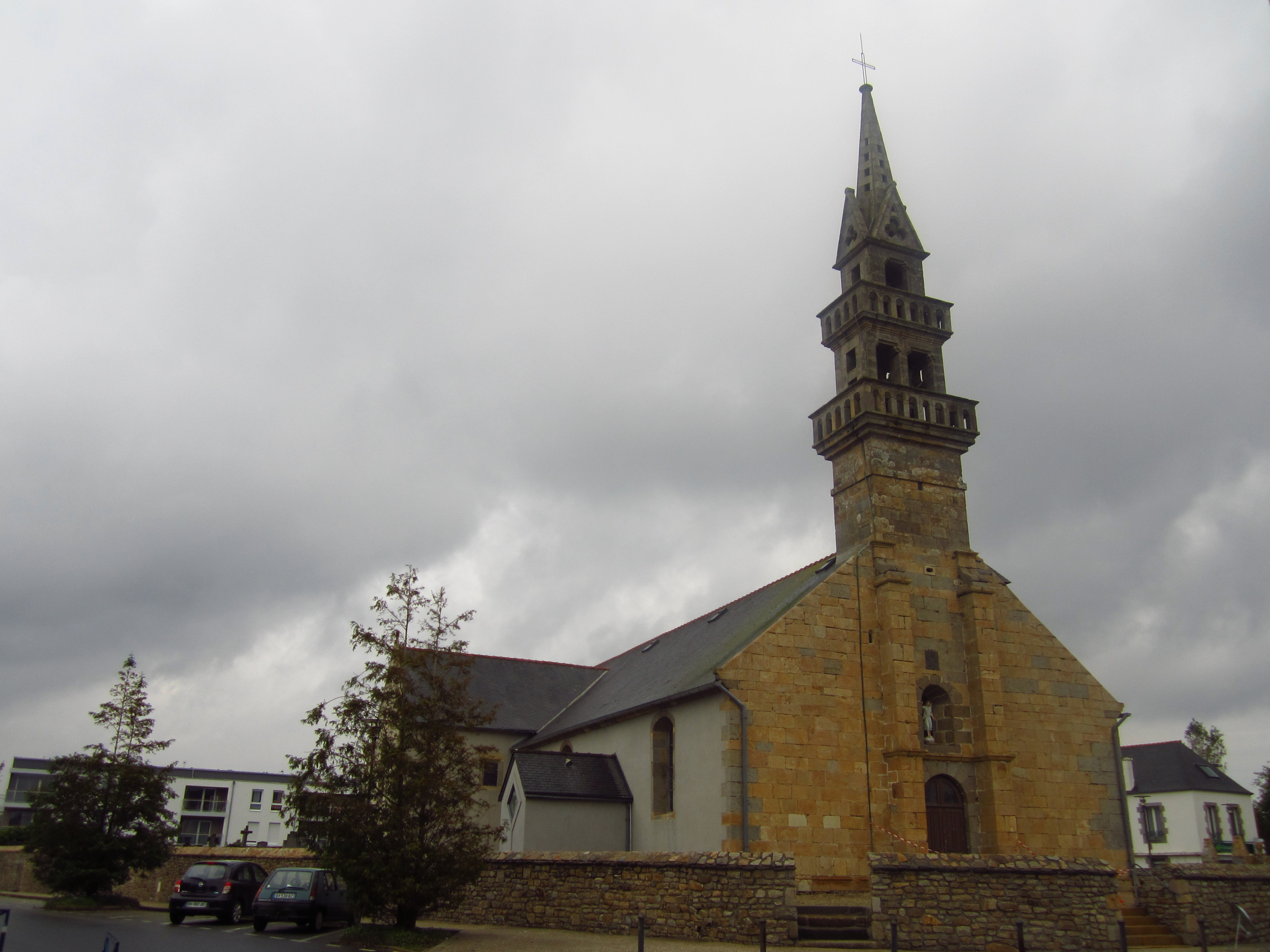
- The church of Saint-Valentin, in Guilers

- Coat of arms
- Location of Guilers
- Location within France Location within Brittany
- Coordinates: 48°25′31″N 4°33′24″W
- Country: France
- Region: Brittany
- Department: Finistère
- Arrondissement: Brest
- Canton: Brest-4
- Intercommunality: Brest Métropole

Government
  - Mayor (2020–2026): Pierre Ogor
- Area^{1}: 18.98 km^{2} (7.33 sq mi)
- Highest elevation: 96 m (315 ft)
- Lowest elevation: 0 m (0 ft)
- Population (2023): 8,268
  - Density: 435.6/km^{2} (1,128/sq mi)
- Time zone: UTC+01:00 (CET)
  - Summer (DST): UTC+02:00 (CEST)
- INSEE/Postal code: 29069 /29820
- ^{1} French Land Register data, which excludes lakes, ponds, glaciers > 1 km^{2} (0.386 sq mi or 247 acres) and river estuaries.

Guilers (French pronunciation: [ɡilɛʁ]; Breton: Gwiler-Leon) is a commune in the Finistère department of Brittany in north-western France.

== Population ==
Inhabitants of Guilers are called in French Guilériens.

Historical population

Year	Pop.	±% p.a.
1793	1,200	—
1800	1,175	−0.30%
1806	1,184	+0.13%
1821	1,231	+0.26%
1831	1,281	+0.40%
1836	1,437	+2.32%
1841	1,451	+0.19%
1846	1,556	+1.41%
1851	1,667	+1.39%
1856	1,702	+0.42%
1861	1,751	+0.57%
1866	1,802	+0.58%
1872	1,734	−0.64%
1876	1,748	+0.20%
1881	1,594	−1.83%
1886	2,105	+5.72%
1891	1,910	−1.93%
1896	1,821	−0.95%
1901	1,917	+1.03%

Year	Pop.	±% p.a.
1906	2,206	+2.85%
1911	2,188	−0.16%
1921	1,982	−0.98%
1926	1,996	+0.14%
1931	2,008	+0.12%
1936	2,053	+0.44%
1946	1,968	−0.42%
1954	2,161	+1.18%
1962	1,846	−1.95%
1968	1,879	+0.30%
1975	4,678	+13.92%
1982	6,686	+5.23%
1990	6,785	+0.18%
1999	6,956	+0.28%
2007	7,290	+0.59%
2012	7,703	+1.11%
2017	7,981	+0.71%
2023	8,268	+0.59%

Source: EHESS and INSEE (1968-2023)

== Breton language ==
In 2008, 7.02% of primary-school children attended bilingual schools, where Breton language is taught alongside French.

== See also ==
- Communes of the Finistère department
