= Le Relecq-Kerhuon =

Le Relecq-Kerhuon Ar Releg-Kerhuon
- Commune
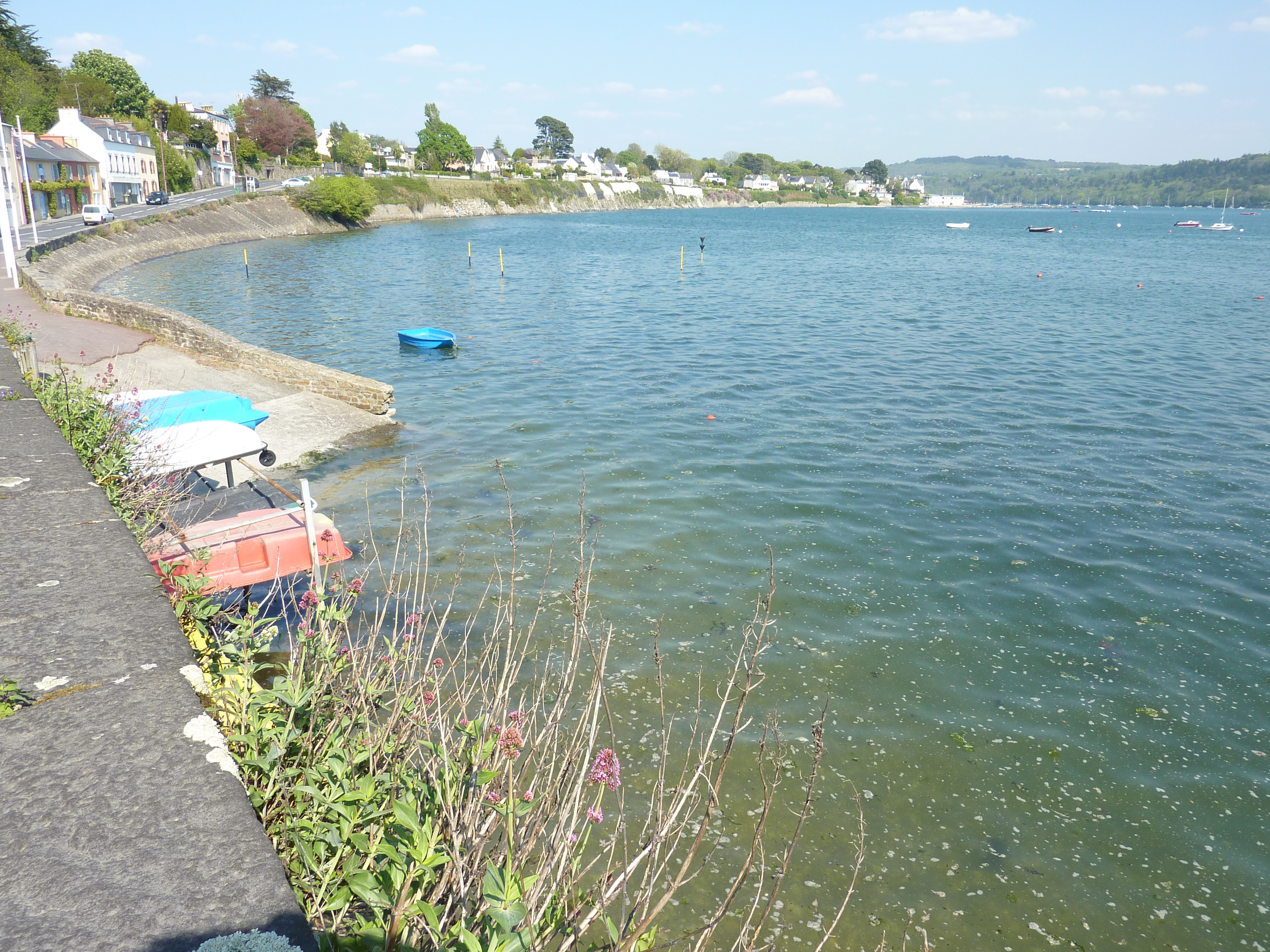
- The cove of Camfrout on the estuary of the Élorn

- Coat of arms
- Location of Le Relecq-Kerhuon
- Location within France Location within Brittany
- Coordinates: 48°24′33″N 4°23′44″W
- Country: France
- Region: Brittany
- Department: Finistère
- Arrondissement: Brest
- Canton: Guipavas
- Intercommunality: Brest Métropole

Government
  - Mayor (2020–2026): Laurent Péron
- Area^{1}: 6.43 km^{2} (2.48 sq mi)
- Highest elevation: 96 m (315 ft)
- Lowest elevation: 0 m (0 ft)
- Population (2023): 11,897
  - Density: 1,850/km^{2} (4,790/sq mi)
- Time zone: UTC+01:00 (CET)
  - Summer (DST): UTC+02:00 (CEST)
- INSEE/Postal code: 29235 /29480
- ^{1} French Land Register data, which excludes lakes, ponds, glaciers > 1 km^{2} (0.386 sq mi or 247 acres) and river estuaries.

Le Relecq-Kerhuon (French pronunciation: [lə ʁəlɛk kɛʁyɔ̃]; Breton: Ar Releg-Kerhuon) is a commune in the Finistère department of Brittany in north-western France.

Le Relecq-Kerhuon is located just east of Brest, France.

== Population ==
Inhabitants of Le Relecq-Kerhuon are called in French Relecquois or Kerhorres.

Historical population

Year	Pop.	±% p.a.
1896	3,523	—
1901	3,772	+1.38%
1906	4,295	+2.63%
1911	4,376	+0.37%
1921	4,878	+1.09%
1926	4,282	−2.57%
1931	4,275	−0.03%
1936	4,696	+1.90%
1946	6,021	+2.52%
1954	5,985	−0.07%

Year	Pop.	±% p.a.
1962	6,526	+1.09%
1968	7,001	+1.18%
1975	8,499	+2.81%
1982	9,286	+1.27%
1990	10,569	+1.63%
1999	10,866	+0.31%
2007	10,746	−0.14%
2012	11,175	+0.79%
2017	11,462	+0.51%
2023	11,897	+0.62%

Source: EHESS and INSEE (1968-2023)

== Breton language ==
The municipality launched a linguistic plan concerning the Breton language through Ya d'ar brezhoneg on 2 September 2005.

== International relations ==
(United Kingdom) Le Relecq-Kerhuon is twinned with Bodmin in Cornwall, UK.

== See also ==
- Communes of the Finistère department
