= Plougastel-Daoulas =

- Commune
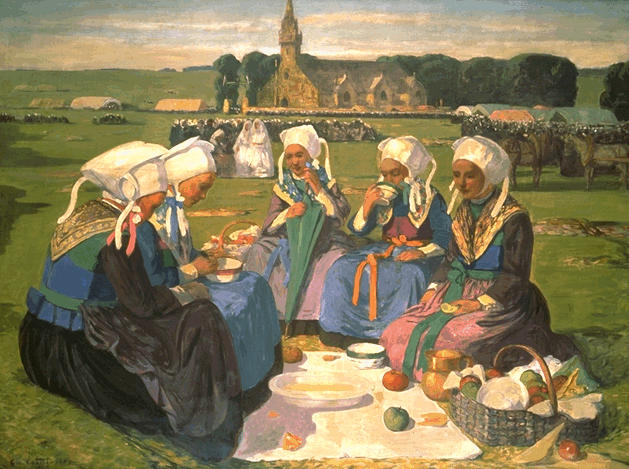
- Women of Plougastel by Charles Cottet, 1903

- Coat of arms
- Location of Plougastel-Daoulas
- Location within France Location within Brittany
- Coordinates: 48°22′24″N 4°22′10″W
- Country: France
- Region: Brittany
- Department: Finistère
- Arrondissement: Brest
- Canton: Guipavas
- Intercommunality: Brest Métropole

Government
  - Mayor (2020–2026): Dominique Cap
- Area^{1}: 46.83 km^{2} (18.08 sq mi)
- Elevation: 110 m (360 ft)
- Highest elevation: 145 m (476 ft)
- Lowest elevation: 0 m (0 ft)
- Population (2023): 13,434
  - Density: 286.9/km^{2} (743.0/sq mi)
- Time zone: UTC+01:00 (CET)
  - Summer (DST): UTC+02:00 (CEST)
- INSEE/Postal code: 29189 /29470
- ^{1} French Land Register data, which excludes lakes, ponds, glaciers > 1 km^{2} (0.386 sq mi or 247 acres) and river estuaries.

Plougastel-Daoulas (French pronunciation: [pluɡastɛl daulas]; Breton: Plougastell-Daoulaz) is a commune in the Finistère department, located in the administrative region of Brittany, northwestern France.

== Population ==
Inhabitants of Plougastel-Daoulas are called plougastels in French.

Historical population

Year	Pop.	±% p.a.
1793	4,059	—
1800	4,059	+0.00%
1806	4,660	+2.33%
1821	5,111	+0.62%
1831	5,515	+0.76%
1836	5,863	+1.23%
1841	5,731	−0.45%
1846	5,999	+0.92%
1851	6,065	+0.22%
1856	5,970	−0.32%
1861	6,090	+0.40%
1866	6,282	+0.62%
1872	6,315	+0.09%
1876	6,506	+0.75%
1881	6,857	+1.06%
1886	7,009	+0.44%
1891	7,162	+0.43%
1896	7,655	+1.34%
1901	7,677	+0.06%

Year	Pop.	±% p.a.
1906	7,733	+0.15%
1911	7,874	+0.36%
1921	7,065	−1.08%
1926	6,965	−0.28%
1931	6,914	−0.15%
1936	6,726	−0.55%
1946	6,894	+0.25%
1954	6,945	+0.09%
1962	6,726	−0.40%
1968	7,075	+0.85%
1975	8,138	+2.02%
1982	9,581	+2.36%
1990	11,139	+1.90%
1999	12,248	+1.06%
2007	13,065	+0.81%
2012	13,080	+0.02%
2017	13,337	+0.39%
2023	13,434	+0.12%

Source: EHESS and INSEE (1968-2023)

== Breton language ==
The municipality launched a linguistic plan concerning the Breton language through Ya d'ar brezhoneg on 28 October 2005.

In 2008, 18.98% of primary-school children attended bilingual schools.

== Strawberries ==
The region is famous for its production of strawberries (gariguette de Plougastel). The New World species of strawberry, Fragaria chiloensis, which had been introduced into France by Amédée-François Frézier (1682–1773), flourished in the marine climate of Plougastel. Gardeners there had observed that this species bore abundant fruit when Fragaria moschata and Fragaria virginiana were planted in alternating rows with it. There had been failed attempts to cultivate fragaria chiloensis in Anjou, Touraine, and the lower-Loire areas.

== Tourism ==
The Albert Louppe Bridge or Plougastel Bridge over the Elorn River is within the commune.

== International relations ==
Plougastel is twinned with Westport, County Mayo, a town in the west of Ireland, and also with Saltash, a town in the south-east of Cornwall, United Kingdom.

== Paintings depicting Plougastel-Daoulas ==
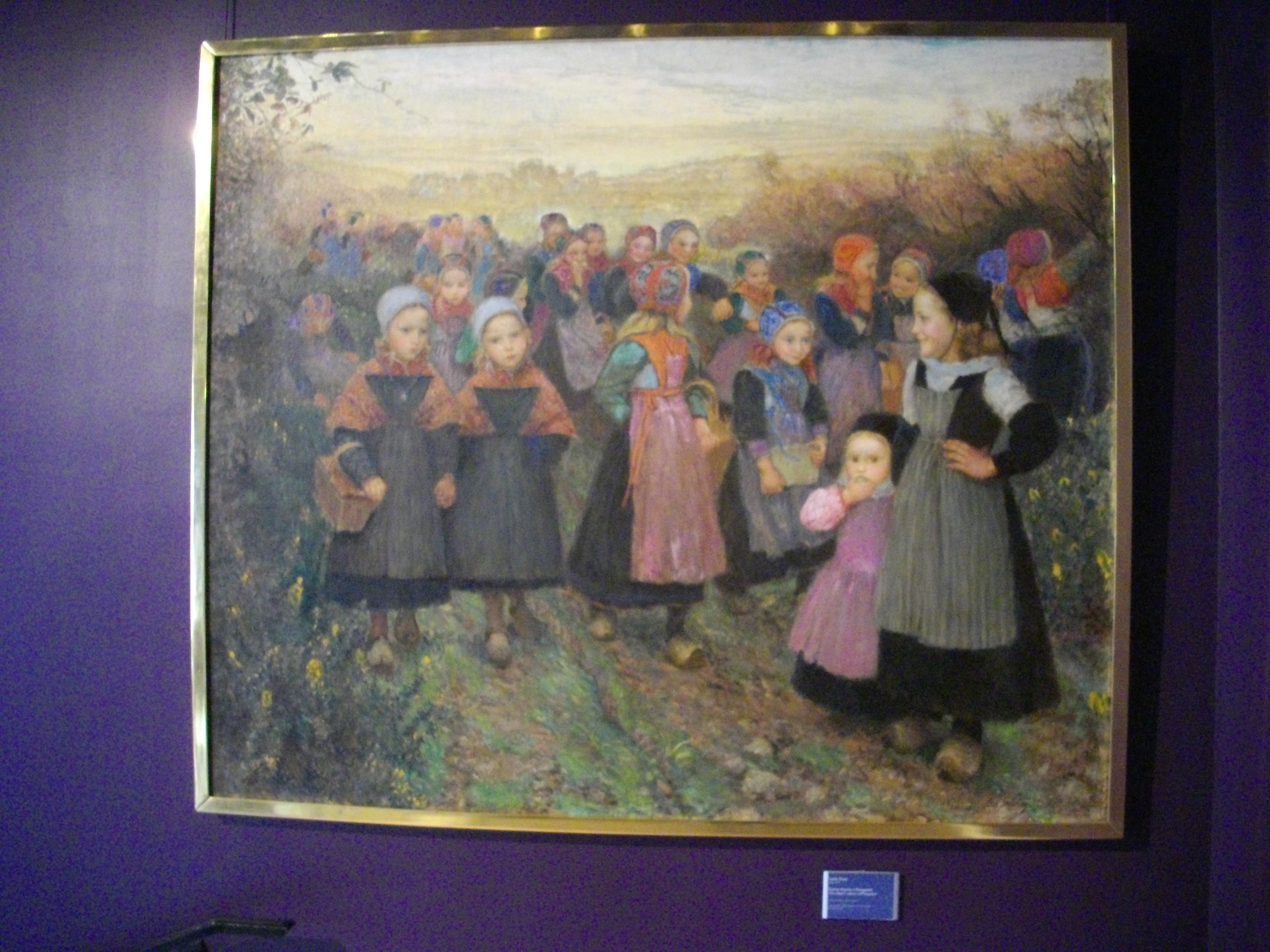
Painting in the Musée des beaux-arts de Reims by Émile Wery titled "Retour d'école à Plougastel?"

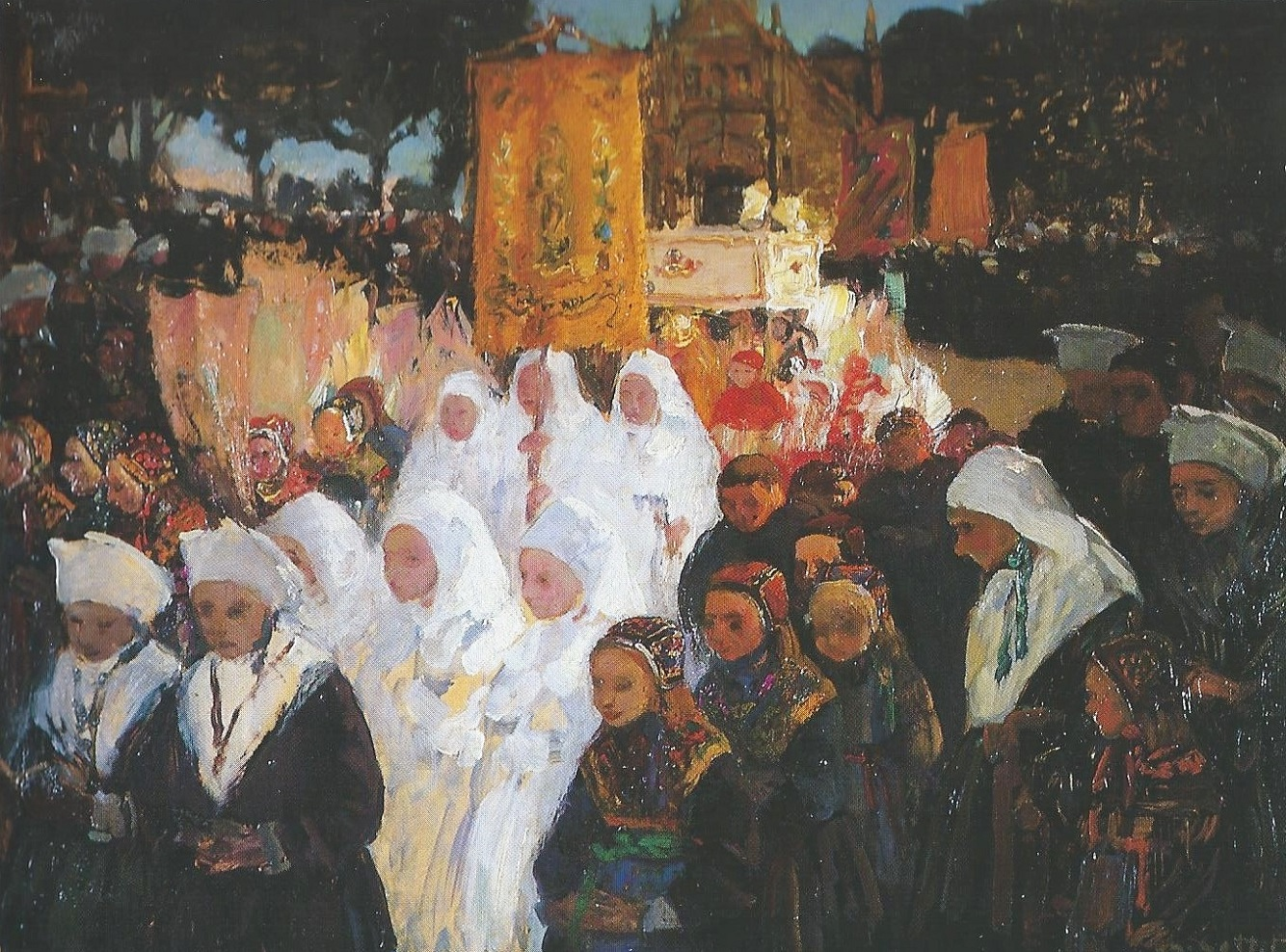
"Jour de Fête-Dieu à Plougastel" by Charles Cottet held in the Musée Crozatier.

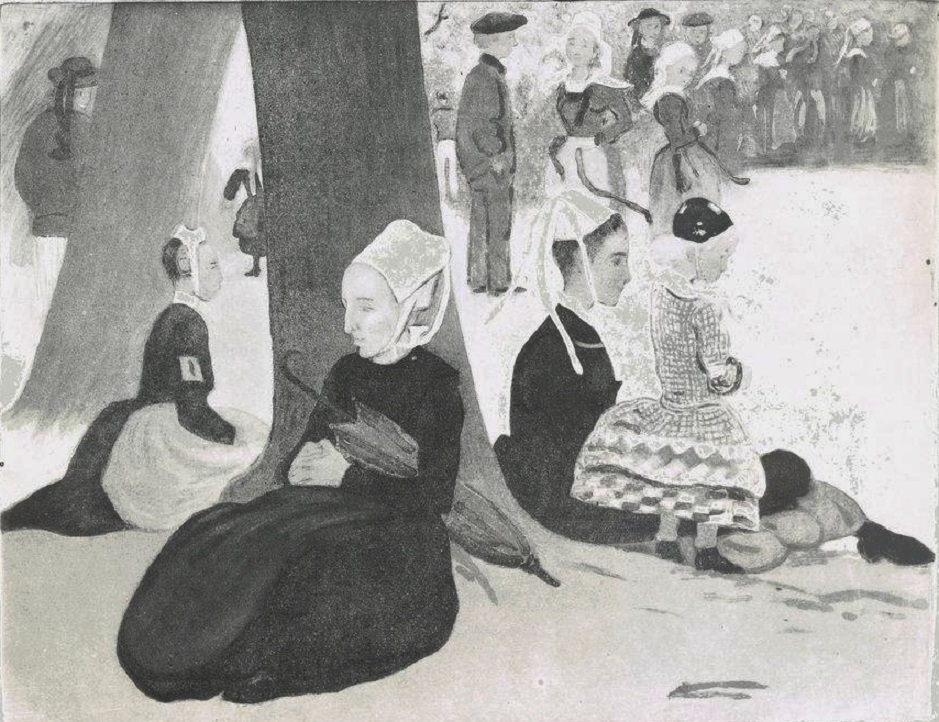
"Femmes de Plougastel au pardon" by Emile Dezaunay.

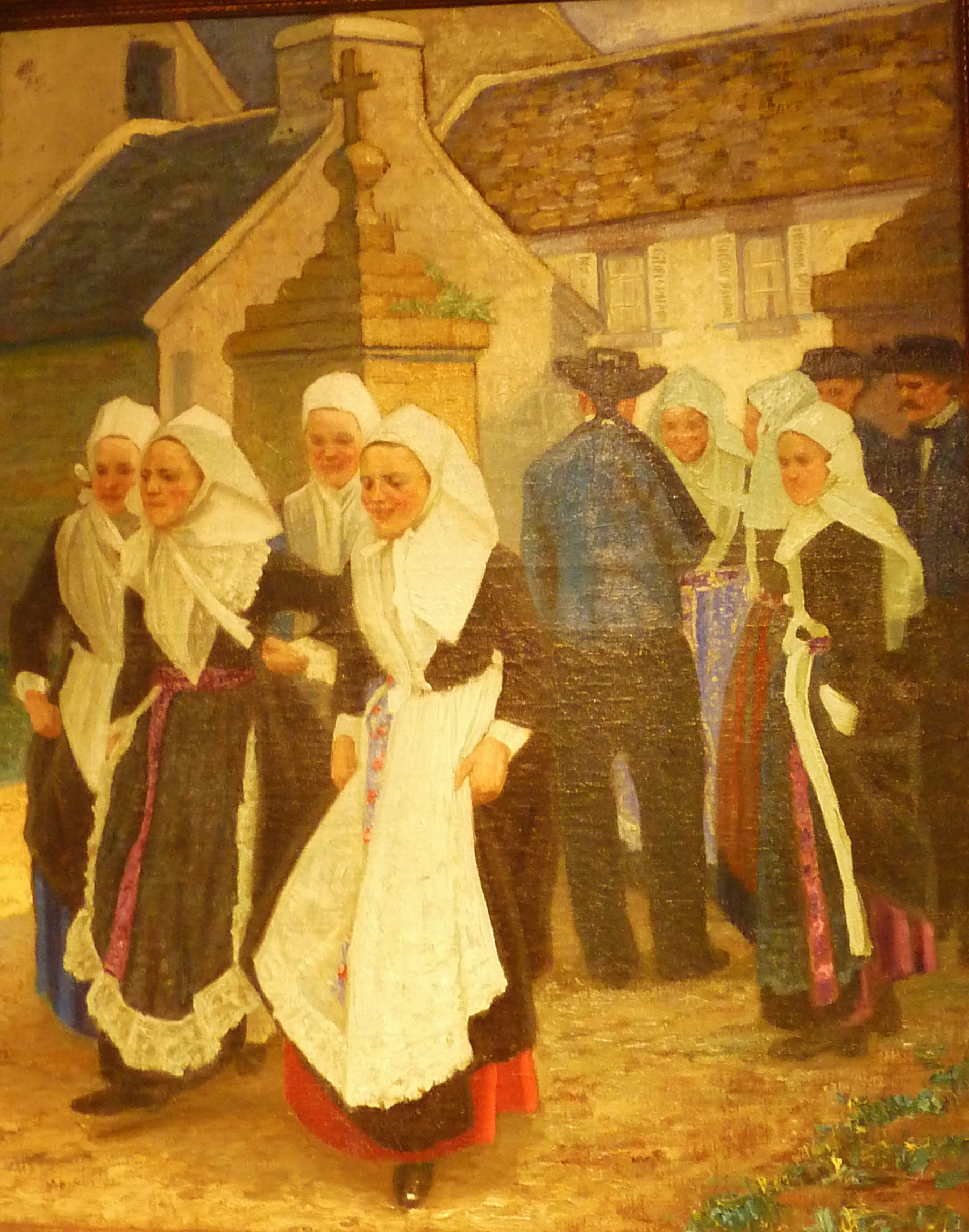
Niemeyer's "L'arrivée des fiancés à Plougastel". This is held by the Musée de la Fraise in Plougastel-Daoulas.

== Churches and chapels in Plougastel-Daoulas ==
=== Église Saint-Pierre ===
The parish church was damaged during the bombing of the 22 and 23 August 1944 and subsequently rebuilt. It contains a notable "rosary" altarpiece and a "mise au Tombeau" both from the old church.

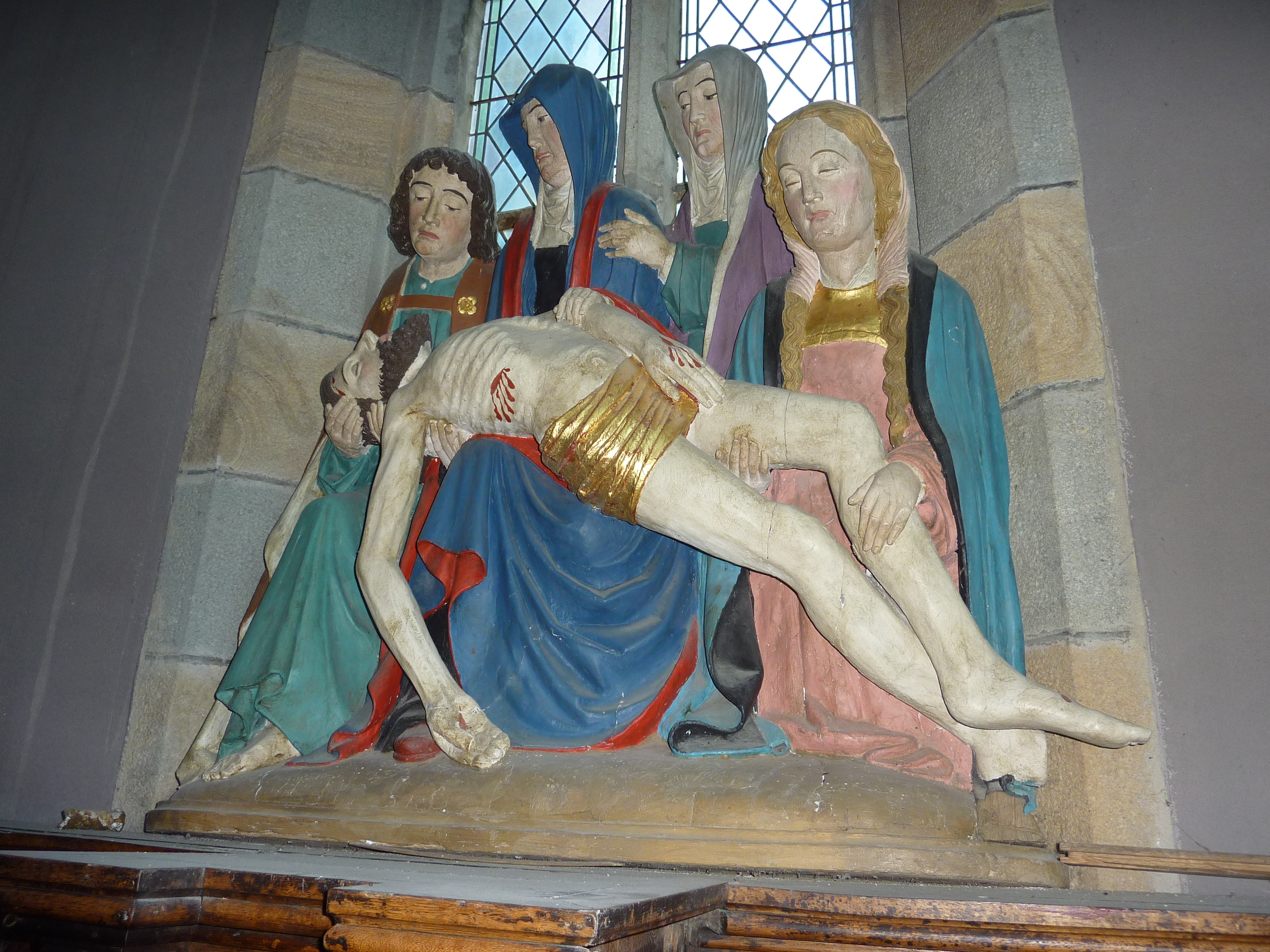
"The descent from the cross" in the Église Saint-Pierre

=== Chapelle Saint-Adrien ===
This chapel has an interesting 17th-century sculpture in wood entitled "Saint Martin et le Pauvre". It depicts Saint Martin's charitable works. See old postcard above showing the sculpture. The chapelle Saint-Adrien dates to 1549 according to the inscription over the south porch.

The chapel contains many statues of saints.

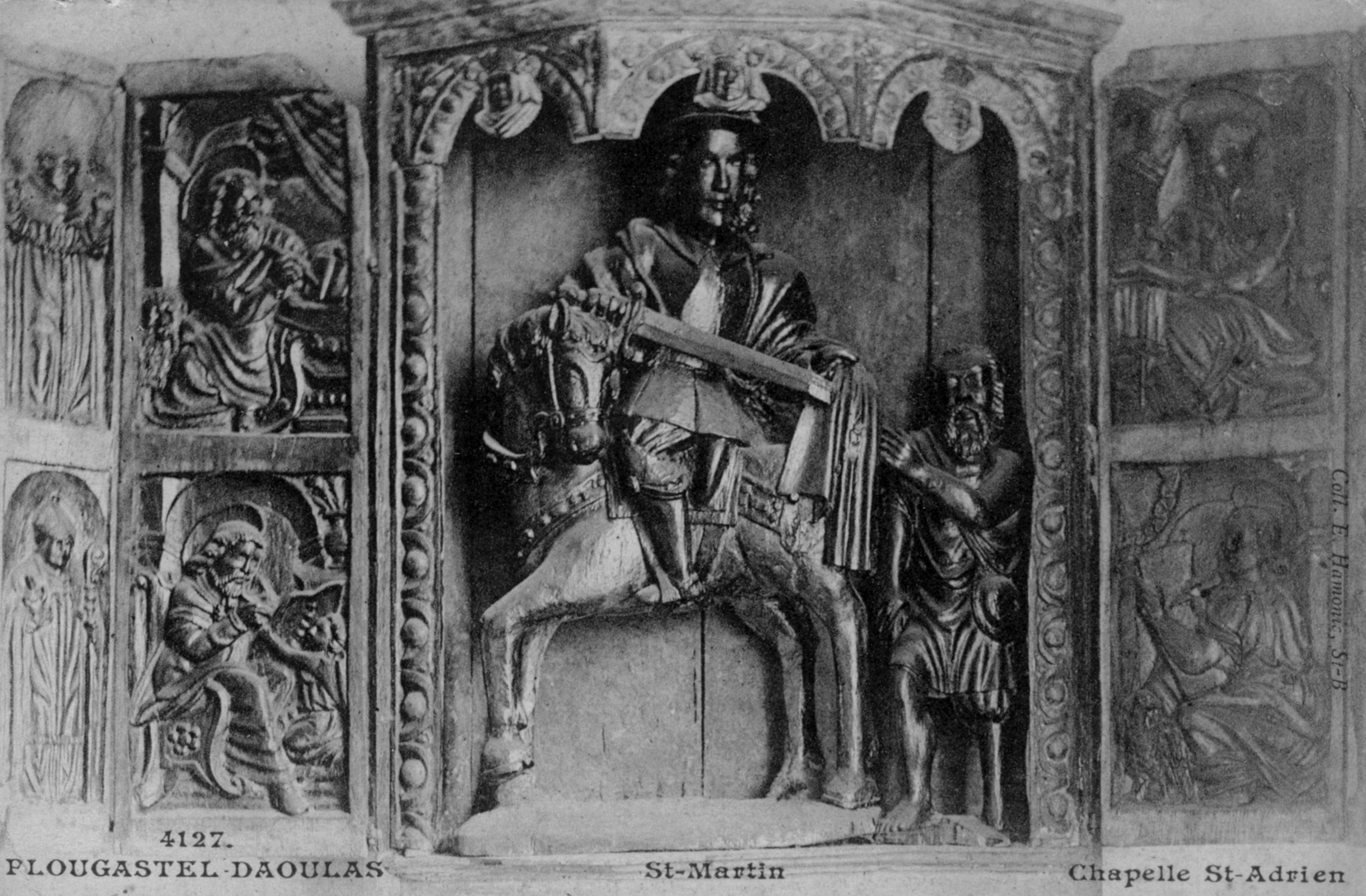
The sculpture "Saint Martin et le Pauvre" in the Saint-Adrien chapel

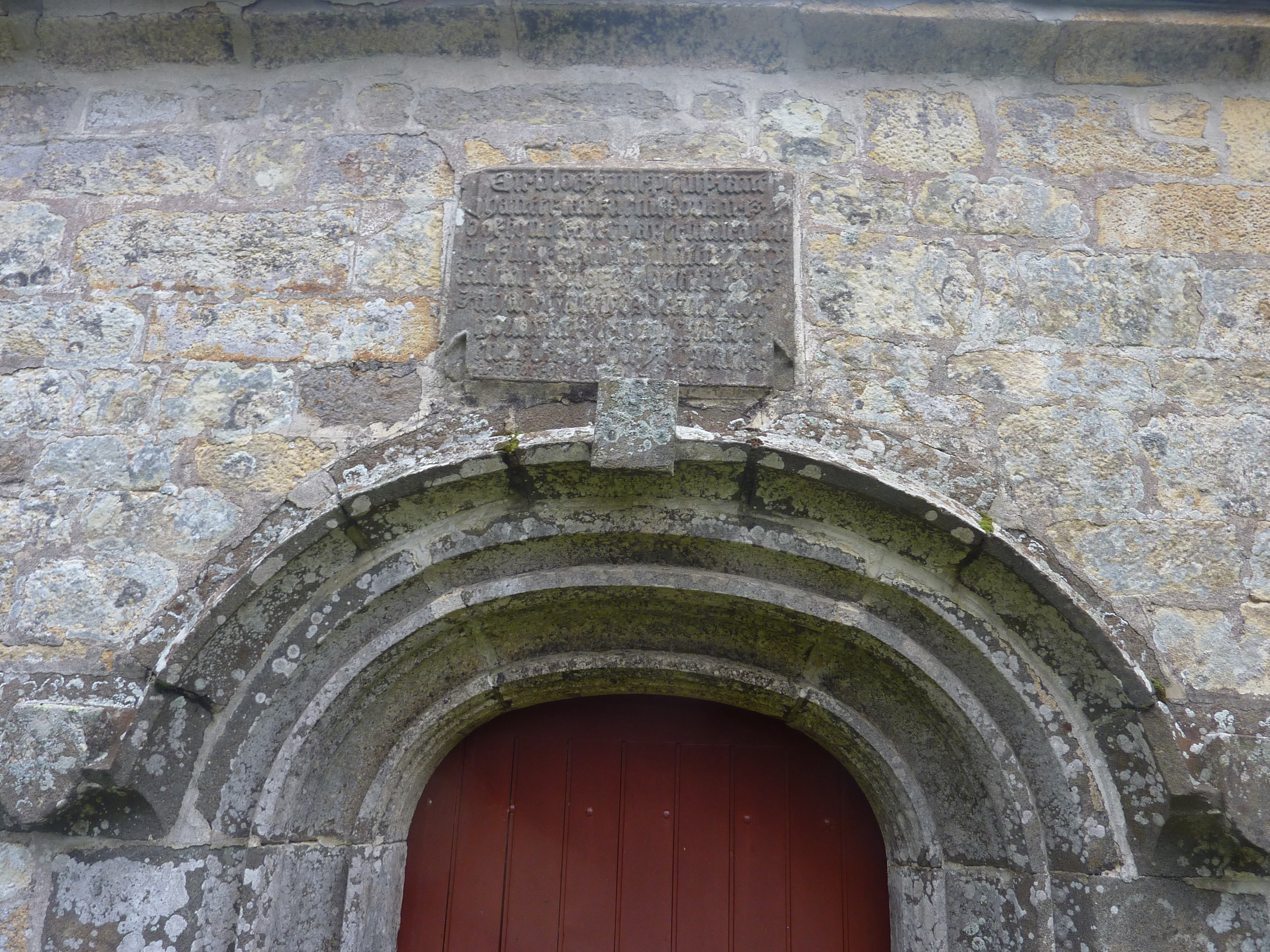
The inscription above the south porch of the Chapelle Saint-Adrien which reads in Breton "En bloaz mil pemp cant hanter cant nemet unan es voe fontet an chapel man en eil sul a mae en amser maest Herry a Castell rector Ploecastell ........ ha sant Adrian" which translates into French "En l'an 1549 fut fondée cette chapelle le second dimanche de mai, au temps de maître Henry du Chastel recteur de Plougastel et de Jean Kergoz dit Monot, gouverneur de cette chapelle, en l'honneur de Dieu, de Notre-Dame de Confort et de saint Adrien".

=== Chapelle Saint-Jean ===
Dating to the 15th century, enlarged in 1607 and restored in 1780. This chapel is associated with a pardon known as the "Pardon des Oiseaux".

=== Chapelle Saint-Guénolé ===
Dedicated to the founder of the abbey at Landévennec, the chapel was restored in 1896. A beam in the chapel bears the date 1514 and by the chevet window there is a stone inscribed "M. I. Le Galle. Cariou. v. 1706". The altarpiece dates to the 17th century and was restored in 1993. There is a statue in polychromed wood of Saint Guénolé in the chapel to the left side of the altarpiece. There are two triptychs in the chapel. One is the Saint Caradec triptych and the other is the Saint Louis triptych.

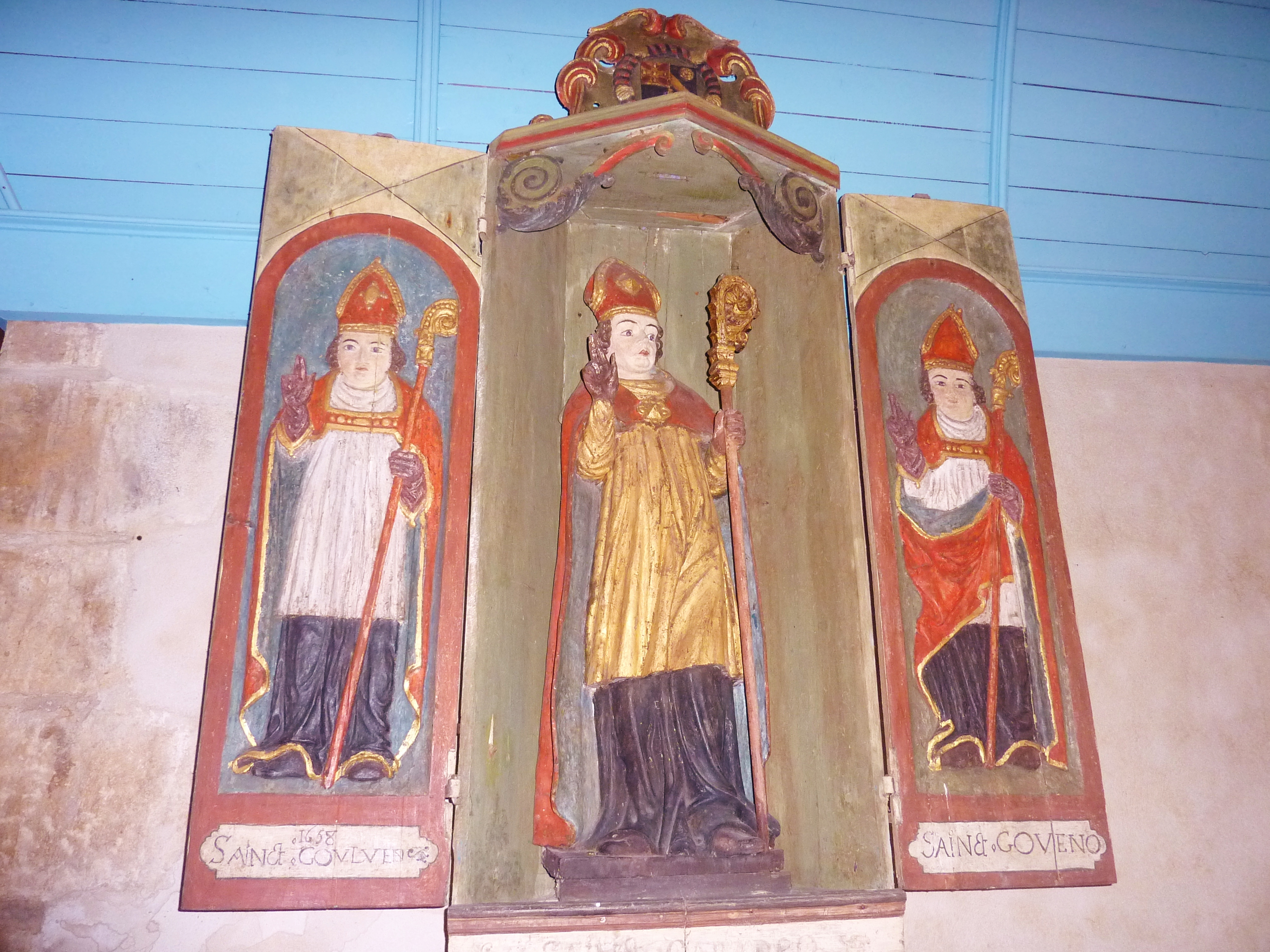
The Saint Caradec triptych

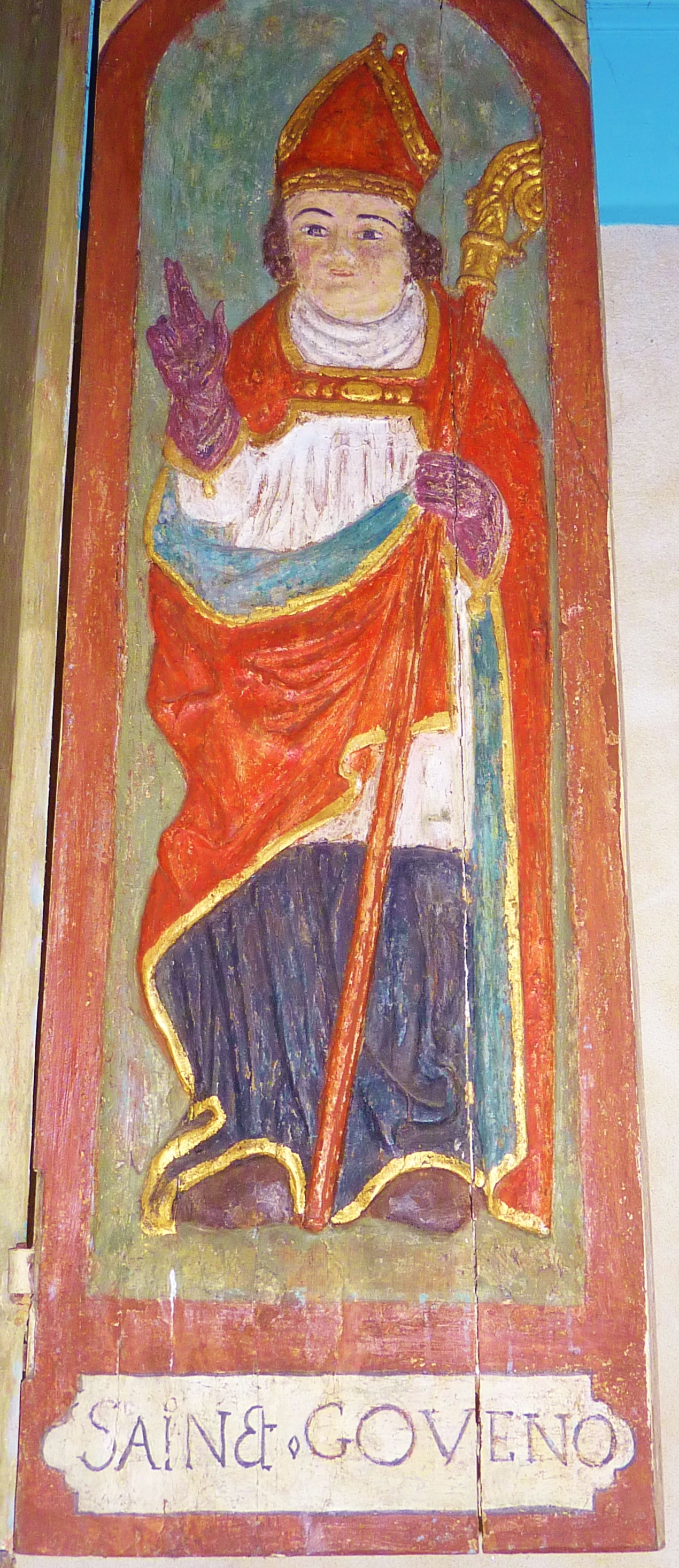
Saint Gouesnou

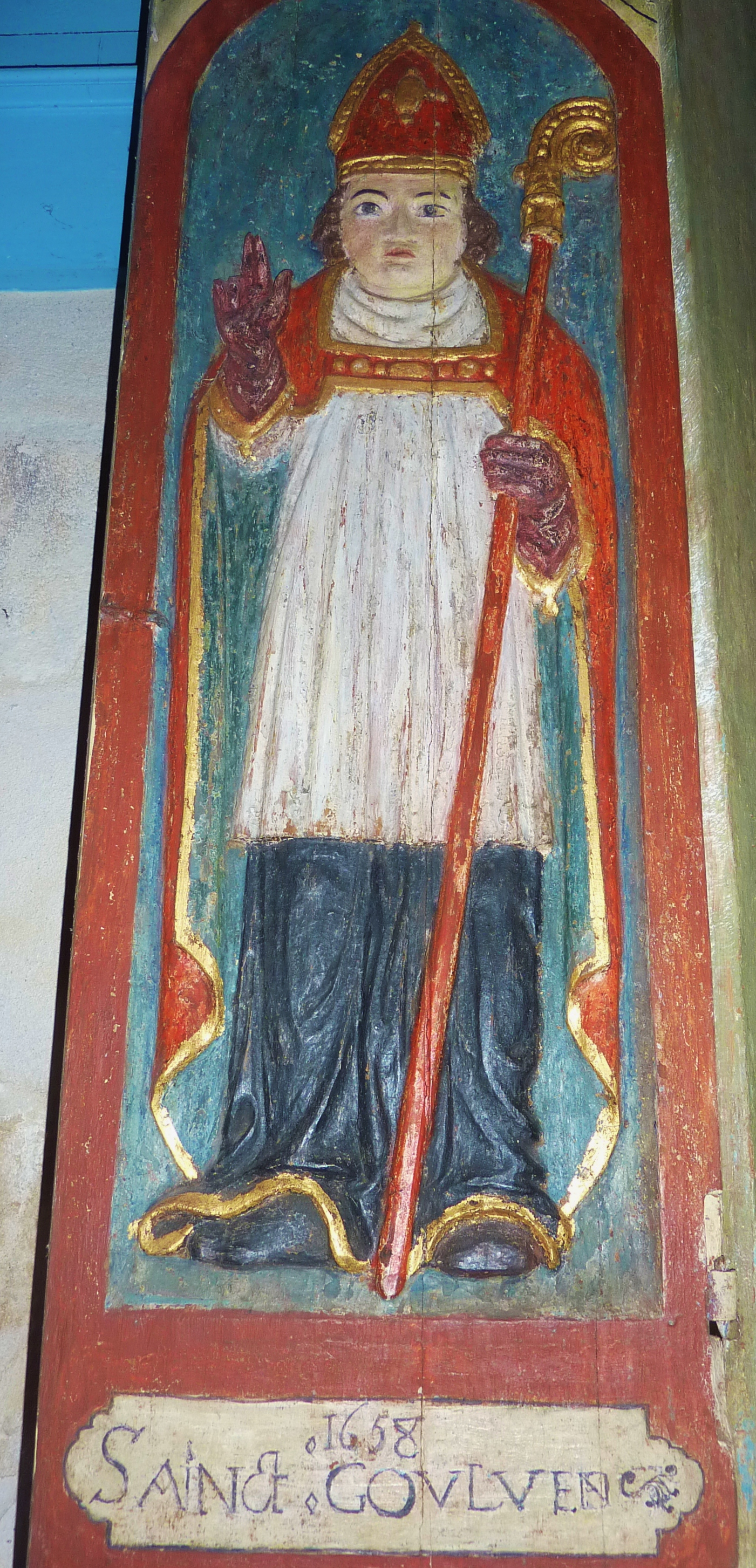
Saint Goulven

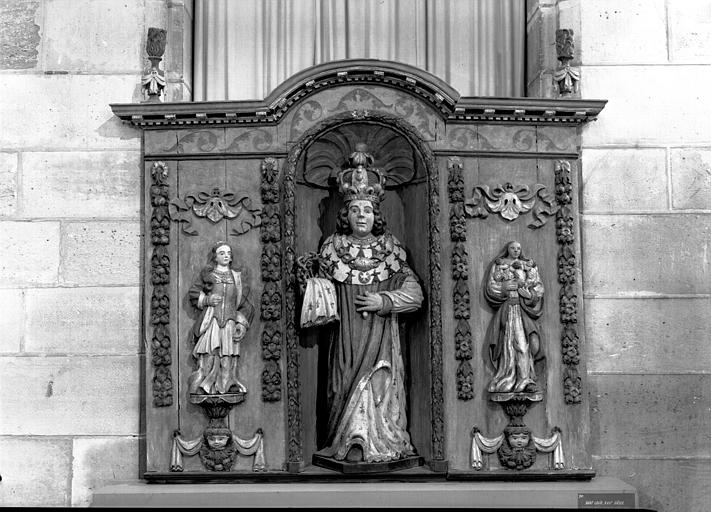
The Saint Louis triptych

=== Chapelle Notre-Dame-de-la-Fontaine-Blanche ===
This was once the priory of the abbey of Daoulas. The clock tower dates to 1702. There are three altars in the chapel dedicated to Saint Lawrence, Saint Mary Magdalene and the Virgin Mary ("Notre-Dame"). These were consecrated in 1508 by Jean Davesnes.

=== Chapelle Saint-Claude ===
Dates to the 16th century. The date 1652 is inscribed above the main entrance. A statue of saint-Claude on a throne is placed by the altarpiece by the main altar. Other dates inscribed are "H. et D. Le Maucaire prieur recteur de Plougastel Jan Corre Fabrique 1661" on the west façade, "Jehan Le Gall Fabrique 1661" on the gable of the south wing and in the sacristy "1747". A painting by Yves Hen in the chapel dates to 1661.

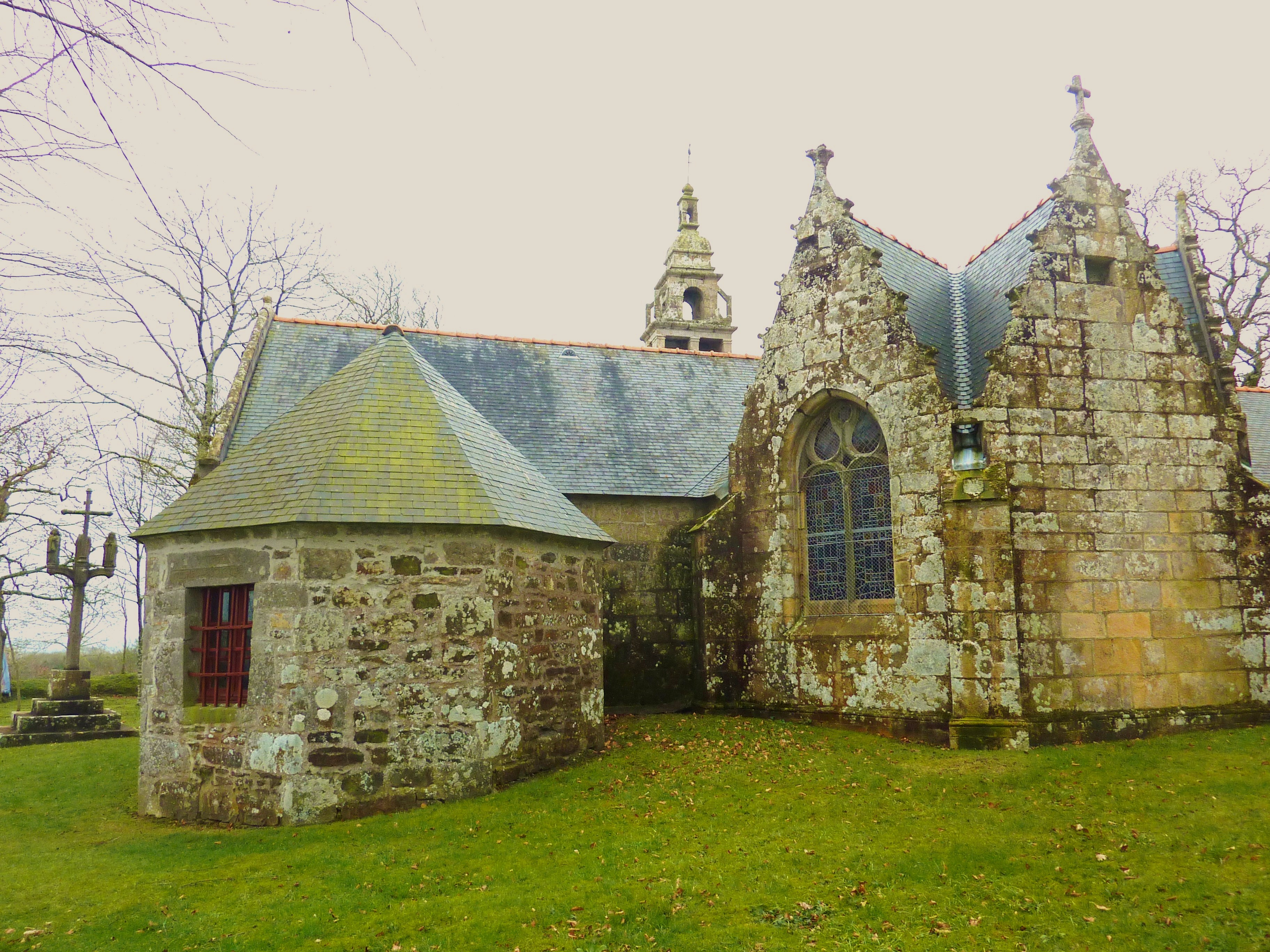
The chevet of the Saint-Claude chapel.

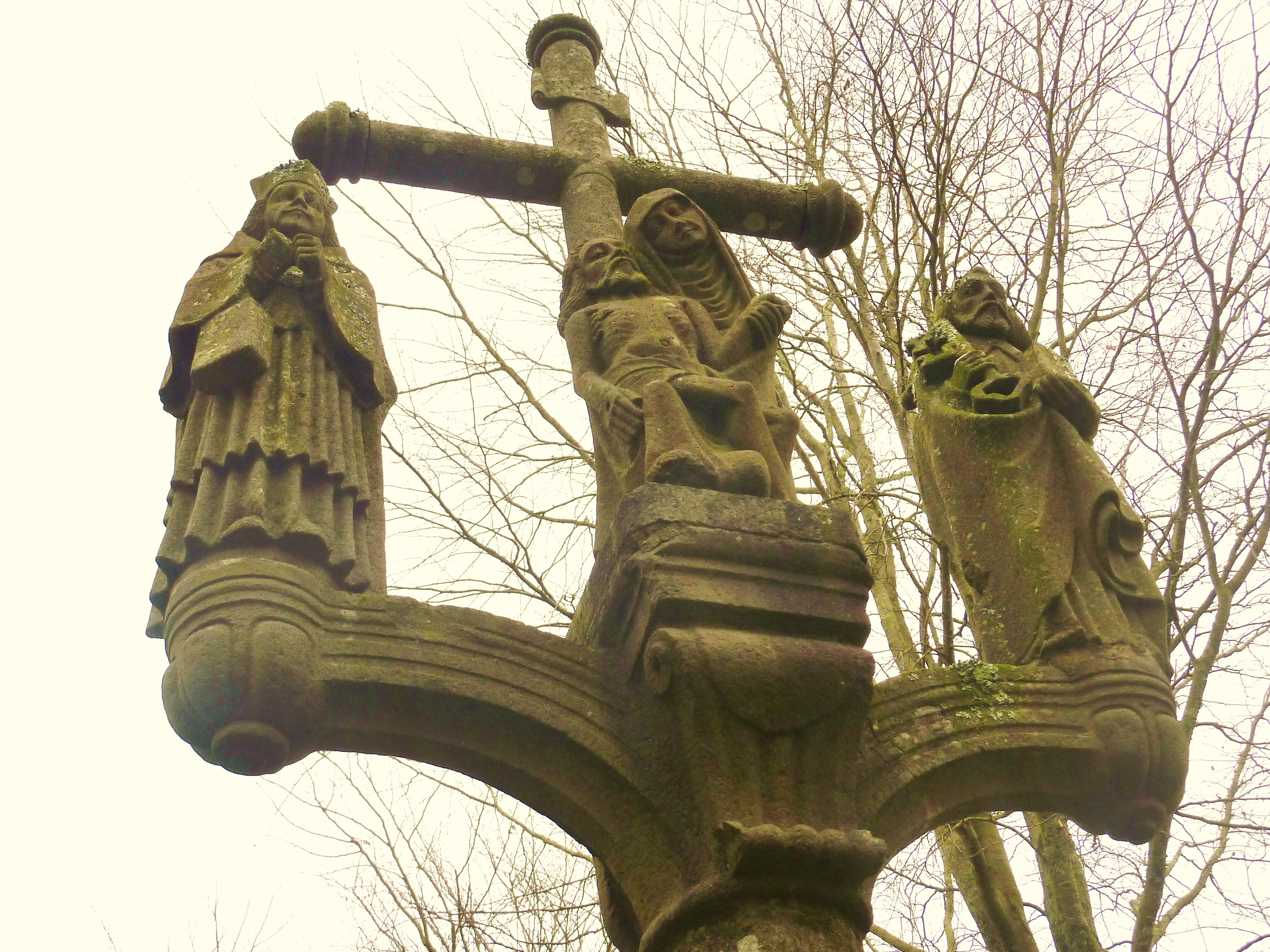
The Calvary.

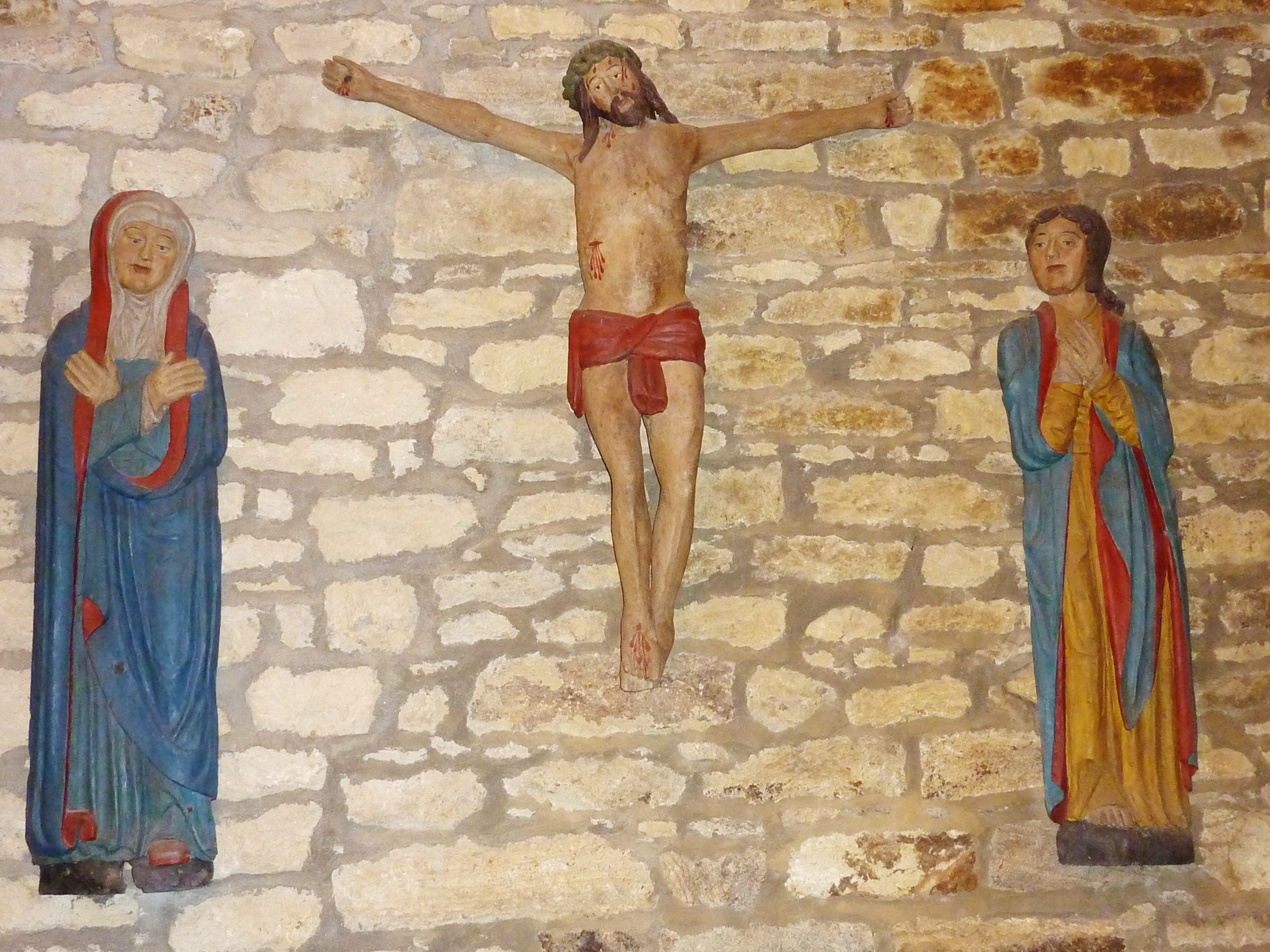
A depiction of the crucifixion in the Saint Claude chapel.

== Other calvaries ==
Of the many calvaries around Plougastel-Daoulas, two involve the sculptor Roland Doré (sculptor).

- The Calvary of Saint-Claude dates to 1630) and has sculptures depicting Saint Peter, Saint Yvese and a Pietà.
- The Calvary at Saint-Guénolé.

== The mystery of Plougastel ==
Not far from nearby Anse du Caro, a message is carved on a rock, beginning with "grocar drear diozeevbio", followed on by other writings in an unknown language. The text includes enigmatic drawings, such as a heart linked to a cross, and a sailboat close to the sea. Two numbers on the rock are decryptable: 1786 and 1787.

== See also ==
- Communes of the Finistère department
- The calvary of Plougastel-Daoulas
- Plougastel-Daoulas Parish Close
- List of the works of the Maître de Plougastel
- List of the works of the Maître de Thégonnec
