= Guipavas =

Guipavas Gwipavaz (Breton)
- Commune
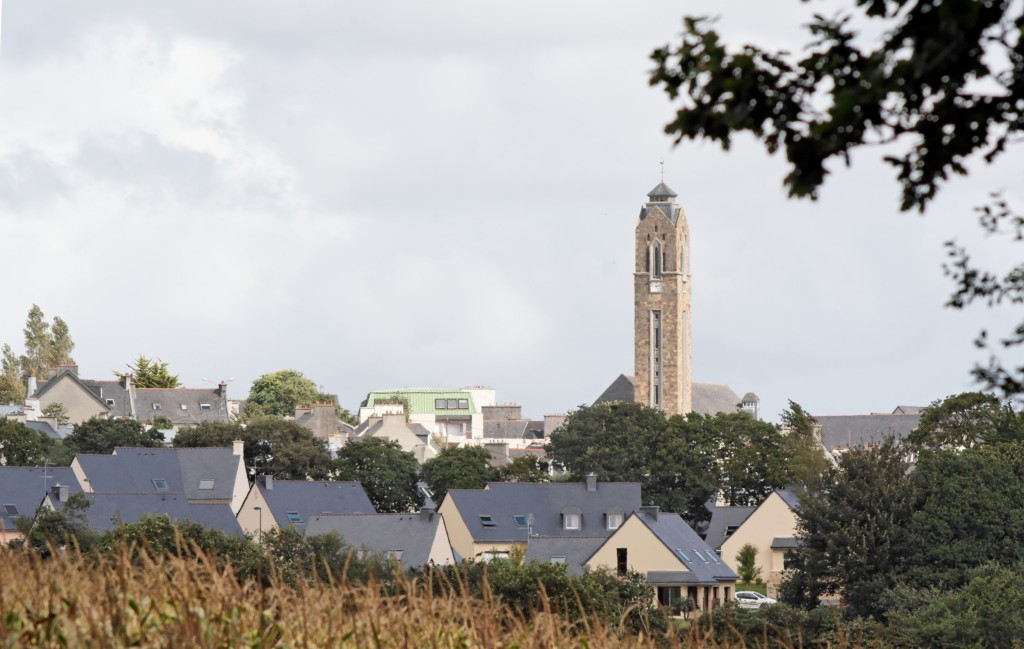
- Guipavas, seen from West

- Coat of arms
- Location of Guipavas
- Location within France Location within Brittany
- Coordinates: 48°26′03″N 4°23′58″W
- Country: France
- Region: Brittany
- Department: Finistère
- Arrondissement: Brest
- Canton: Guipavas
- Intercommunality: Brest Métropole

Government
  - Mayor (2020–2026): Fabrice Jacob
- Area^{1}: 44.13 km^{2} (17.04 sq mi)
- Highest elevation: 131 m (430 ft)
- Lowest elevation: 0 m (0 ft)
- Population (2023): 15,538
  - Density: 352.1/km^{2} (911.9/sq mi)
- Time zone: UTC+01:00 (CET)
  - Summer (DST): UTC+02:00 (CEST)
- INSEE/Postal code: 29075 /29490
- ^{1} French Land Register data, which excludes lakes, ponds, glaciers > 1 km^{2} (0.386 sq mi or 247 acres) and river estuaries.

Guipavas (French pronunciation: [ɡipava]; Breton: Gwipavaz) is a commune in the Finistère department of Brittany in north-western France. The writer Maurice Polard (born 1932) is from Guipavas.

The city is divided into two major parts: the west, known as the dynamic core of the city and suburban area of Brest, where a new commercial centre opened in 2007, and the east, which is more traditional and lies around the Roman Catholic church.

== Population ==
Inhabitants of Guipavas are called in French Guipavasiens.

Historical population

Year	Pop.	±% p.a.
1793	2,905	—
1800	3,547	+2.89%
1806	3,845	+1.35%
1821	5,688	+2.64%
1831	5,332	−0.64%
1836	5,108	−0.85%
1841	5,312	+0.79%
1846	5,520	+0.77%
1851	6,047	+1.84%
1856	6,042	−0.02%
1861	6,356	+1.02%
1866	6,356	+0.00%
1872	6,641	+0.73%
1876	6,802	+0.60%
1881	7,077	+0.80%
1886	7,247	+0.48%
1891	8,339	+2.85%
1896	5,174	−9.10%
1901	5,221	+0.18%

Year	Pop.	±% p.a.
1906	5,238	+0.07%
1911	5,061	−0.69%
1921	5,002	−0.12%
1926	4,624	−1.56%
1931	4,562	−0.27%
1936	4,894	+1.41%
1946	5,532	+1.23%
1954	6,105	+1.24%
1962	6,610	+1.00%
1968	7,346	+1.78%
1975	8,959	+2.88%
1982	10,425	+2.19%
1990	11,956	+1.73%
1999	12,584	+0.57%
2007	13,855	+1.21%
2012	13,586	−0.39%
2017	14,482	+1.29%
2023	15,538	+1.18%

Source: EHESS and INSEE (1968-2023)

== Breton language ==
- In 2023, 6.1% of primary-school children attended bilingual schools, where Breton language is taught alongside French.

== See also ==
- Brest Bretagne Airport
- Communes of the Finistère department
- Yann Larhantec
- List of the works of Bastien and Henry Prigent
