= Locronan =

Locronan Lokorn
- Commune
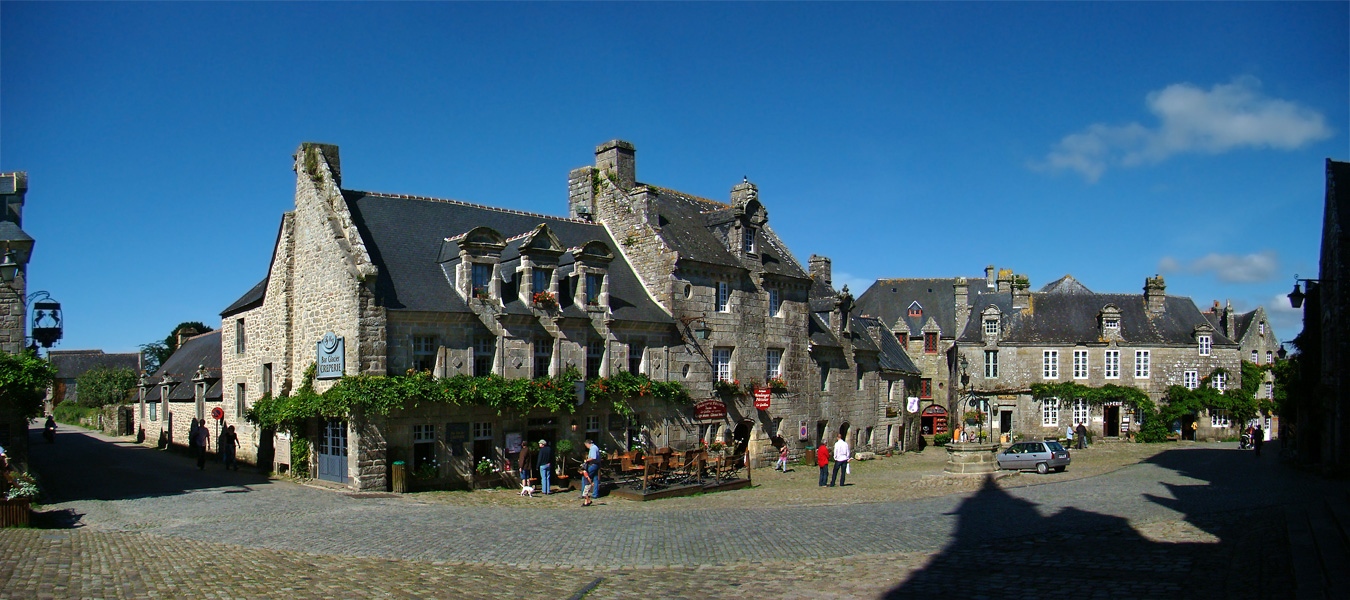
- The church square

- Coat of arms
- Location of Locronan
- Location within France Location within Brittany
- Coordinates: 48°06′00″N 4°12′24″W
- Country: France
- Region: Brittany
- Department: Finistère
- Arrondissement: Quimper
- Canton: Quimper-1
- Intercommunality: Quimper Bretagne Occidentale

Government
  - Mayor (2020–2026): Antoine Gabrièle
- Area^{1}: 8.08 km^{2} (3.12 sq mi)
- Elevation: 145 m (476 ft)
- Highest elevation: 280 m (920 ft)
- Lowest elevation: 38 m (125 ft)
- Population (2023): 829
  - Density: 103/km^{2} (266/sq mi)
- Time zone: UTC+01:00 (CET)
  - Summer (DST): UTC+02:00 (CEST)
- INSEE/Postal code: 29134 /29180
- ^{1} French Land Register data, which excludes lakes, ponds, glaciers > 1 km^{2} (0.386 sq mi or 247 acres) and river estuaries.

Locronan (French pronunciation: [lɔkʁɔnɑ̃]; Breton: Lokorn) is a commune in the Finistère department of Brittany in north-western France.

Locronan is a member of the Les Plus Beaux Villages de France ("The most beautiful villages of France") association.

== Toponymy ==
The village's name means the "hermitage of Ronan", from the Breton lok ("hermitage") of Saint Ronan. It was previously known as Saint-René-du-Bois.

Saint Ronan, greatly venerated in Brittany, was a 6th-century Irish Christian missionary who came to the region to teach the people. As his association with Locronan is close, some of his relics are kept in the parish church.

== History ==
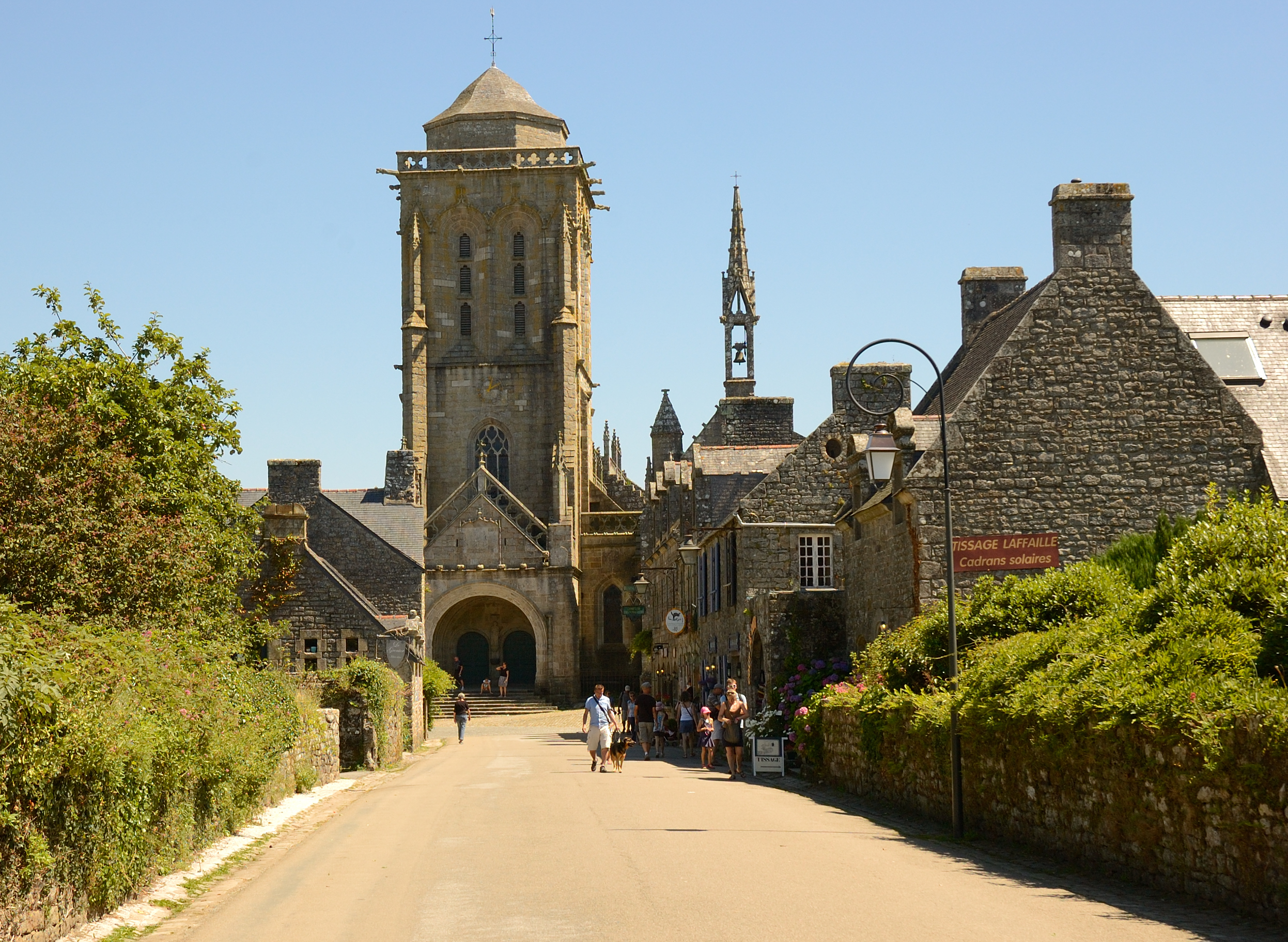
The St Ronan church at Locronan.

Locronan is a small town built at the foot of a hill. It was granted town status in 1505 by Anne of Brittany, who went there on a pilgrimage.

Since the 15th century, hemp has naturally grown in the area (see Hemp in France). It was cultivated and processed in a hemp industry in the town at the time, and it was widely used. The town was quite prosperous. Its hemp was exported internationally, as it was used for rigging the ships, both commercial and military, that operated from Brittany's many ports. The Saint Ronan church was built in this period, as well as the small chapel of Penity.

== Population ==
Historical population
Year	Pop.	±% p.a.
1968	672	—
1975	686	+0.29%
1982	704	+0.37%
1990	796	+1.55%
1999	799	+0.04%
2007	800	+0.02%
2012	806	+0.15%
2017	795	−0.27%
2023	829	+0.70%
Source: INSEE

Inhabitants of Locronan are called in French Locronanais.

== Breton language ==
The municipality launched a plan through Ya d'ar brezhoneg on 23 November 2007 to revive the Breton language.

== Events ==
Troménie is a pilgrimage festival that includes a large procession, whose participants carry the banners of participating parishes.

Held every six years between the second and third Sundays in July, the Grande Troménie is a pilgrimage of about 12 km, traversing the wider sacred area around Locronan. In the intervening five years, the Petite Troménie is held on the second Sunday in July. It is based in the town and church of Locronan. These are among the major pardons or ceremonies of the traditional Breton festal calendar.

== Popular culture ==
Locronan has been used as a setting in films:

- Tess (1979), directed by Roman Polanski
- A Very Long Engagement, directed by Jean-Pierre Jeunet
- Chouans!, directed by Philippe de Broca

Locronan is the hometown of the character Ted's mother in Catriona Ward's novel, The Last House on Needless Street.

== Gallery ==
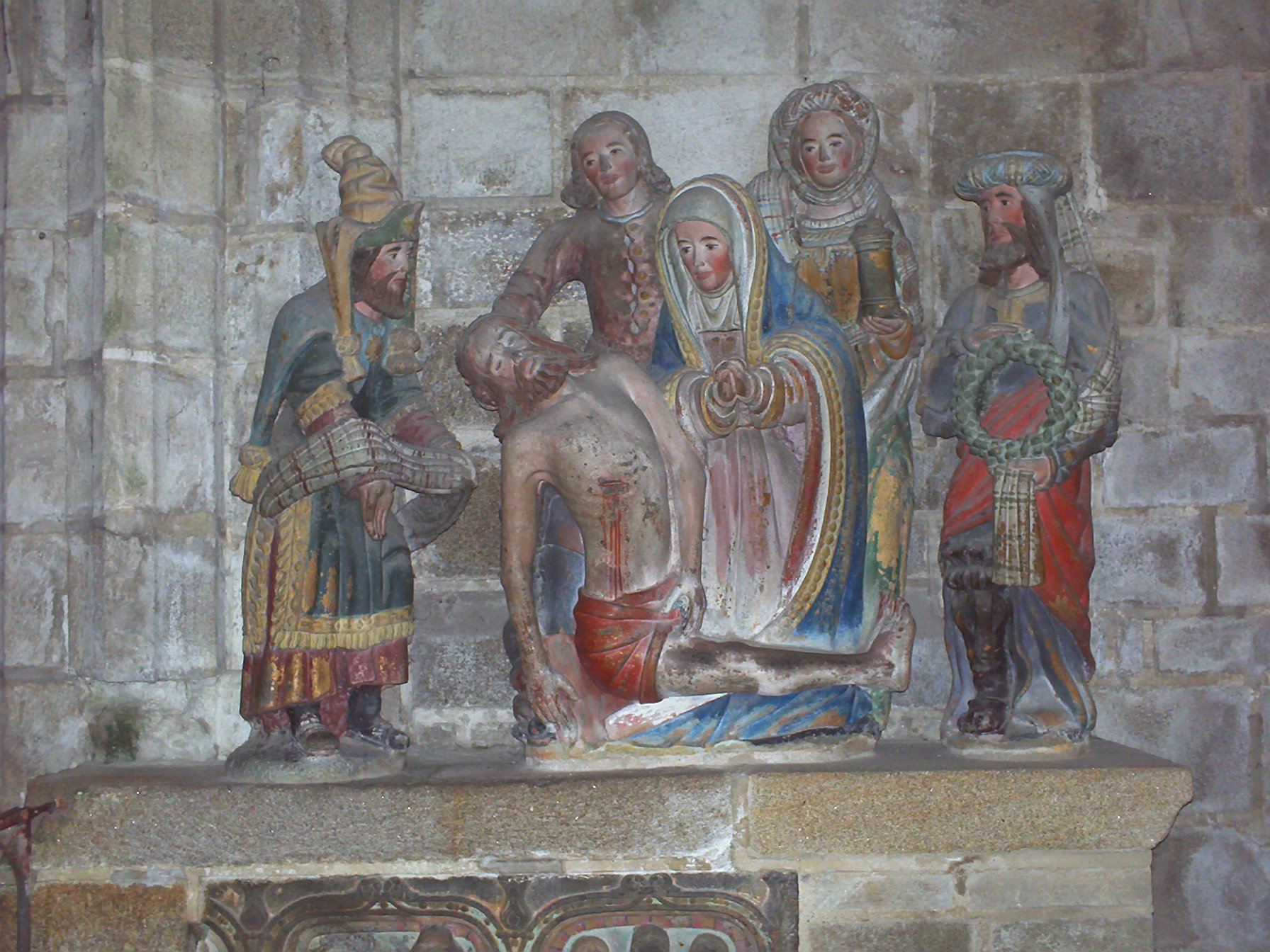
A notable image of the Deposition of Christ in the church at Locronan.

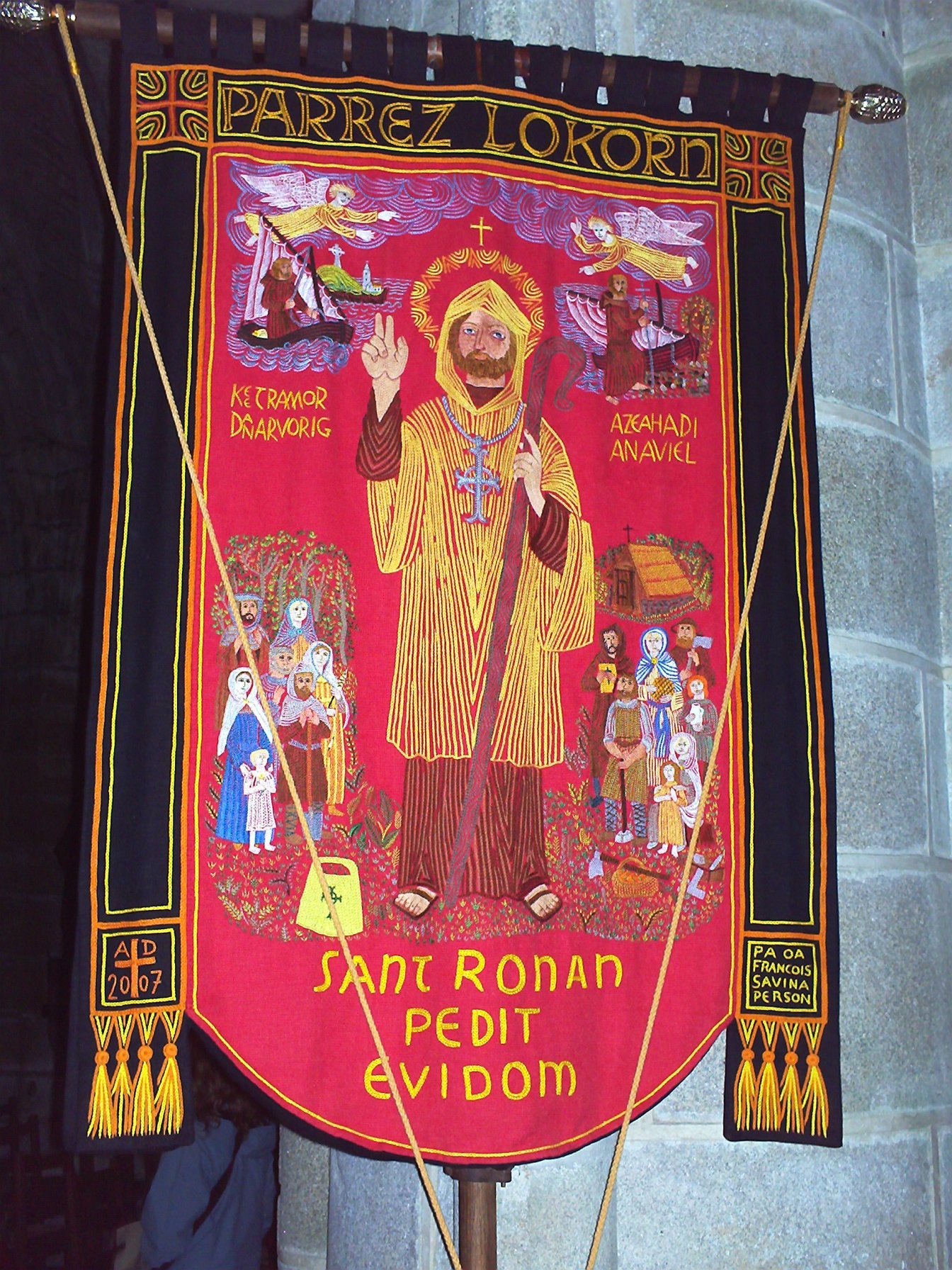
The banner of St Ronan.

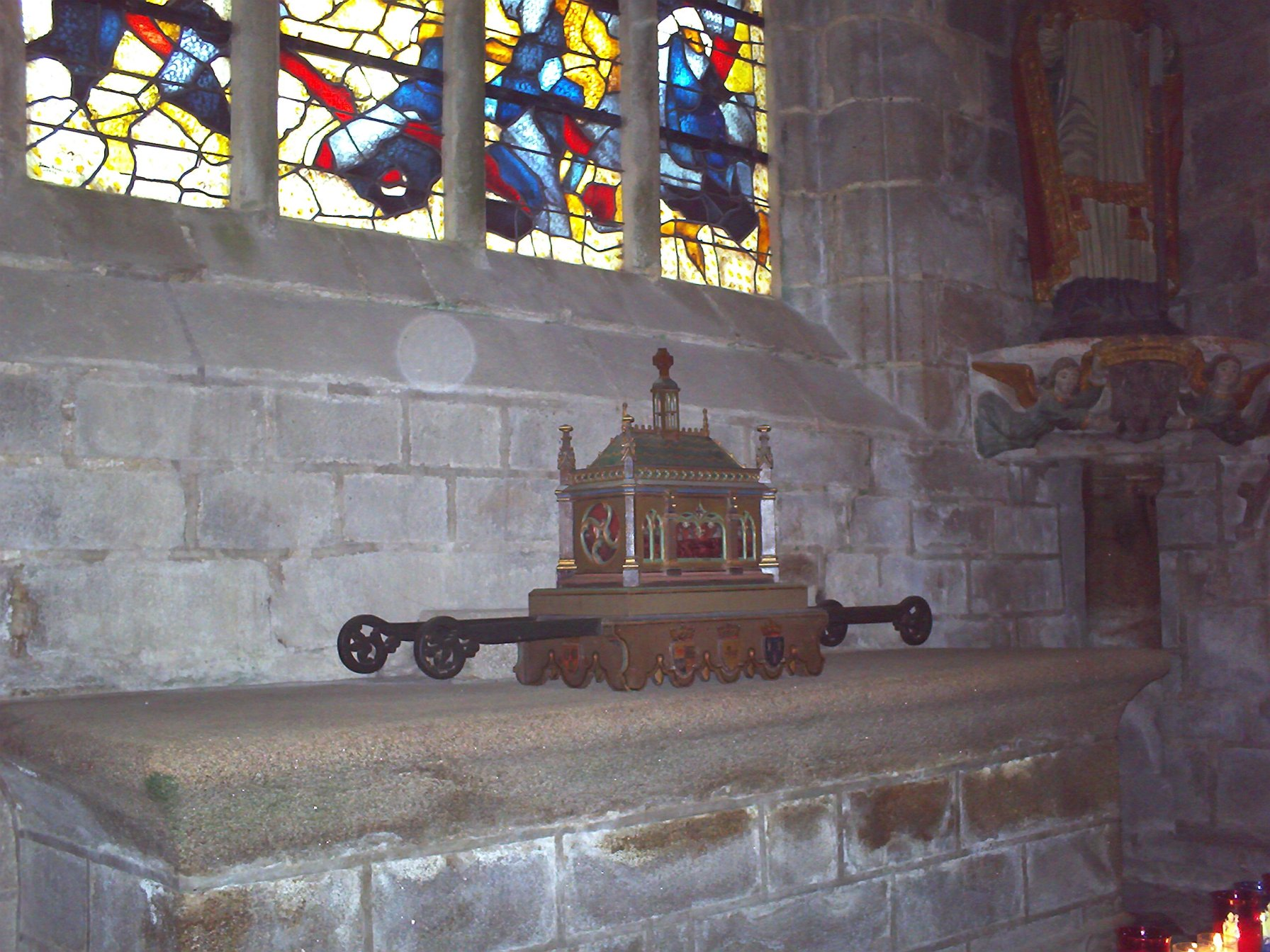
Reliquary holding relics of St Ronan at Locronan.

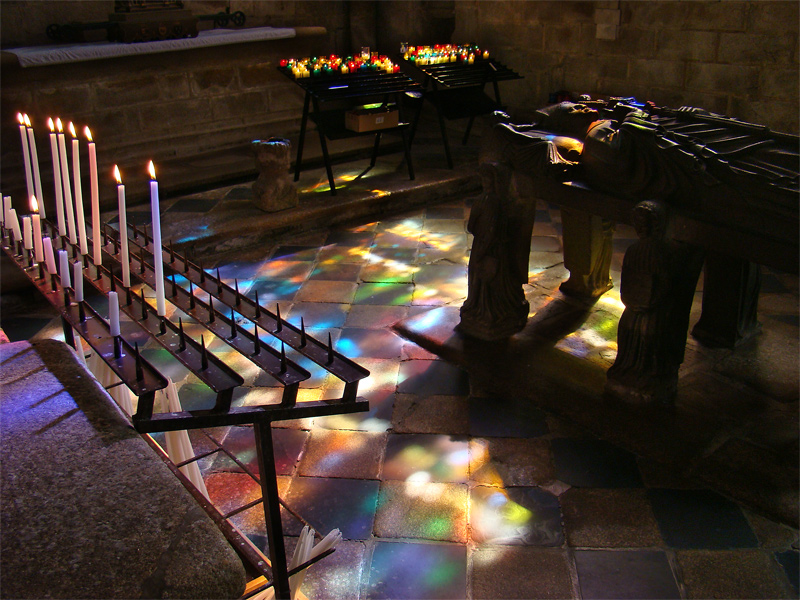
Tomb of St Ronan.

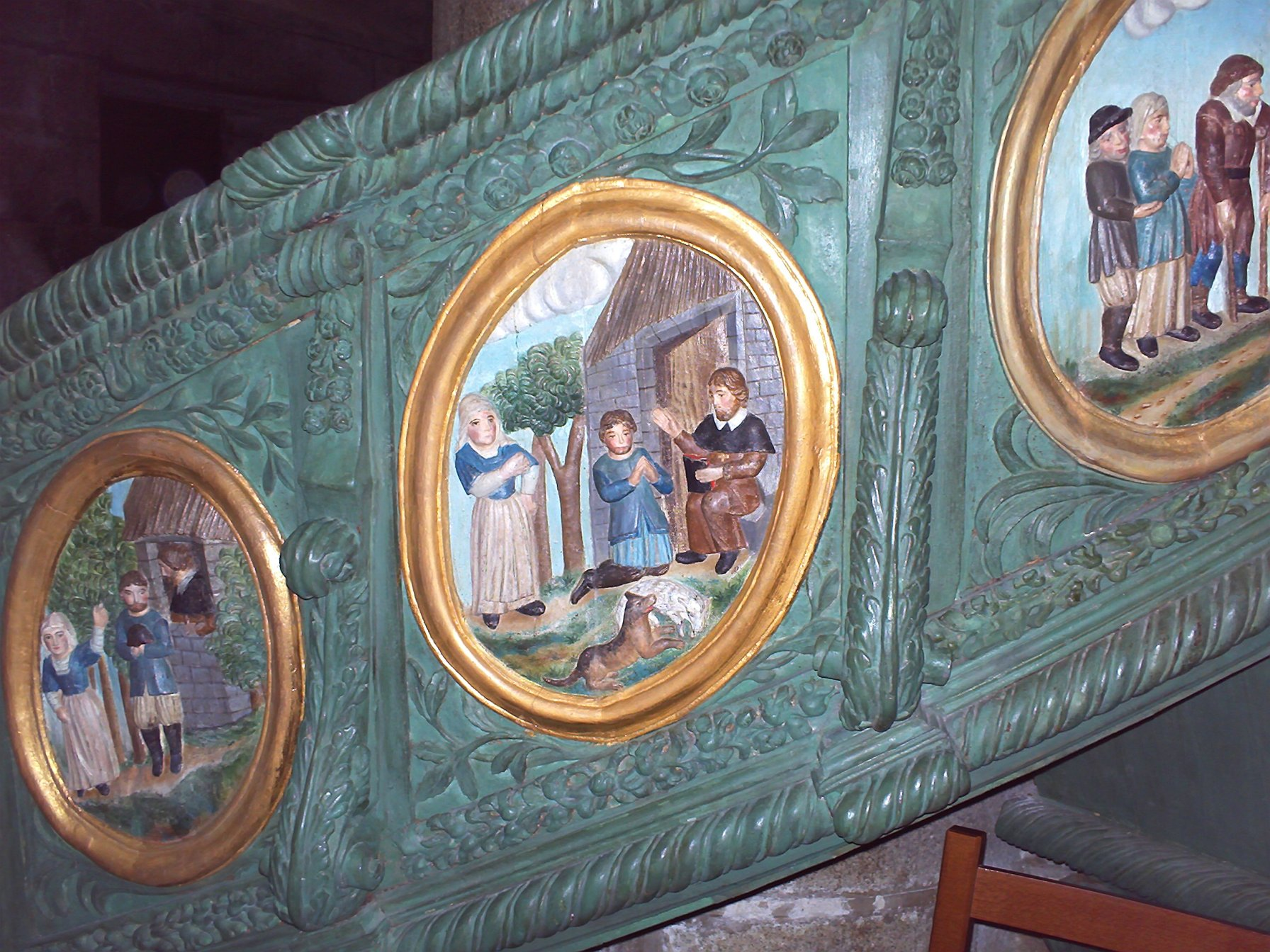
Scenes from the life of St Ronan on the polychrome pulpit at Locronan parish church.

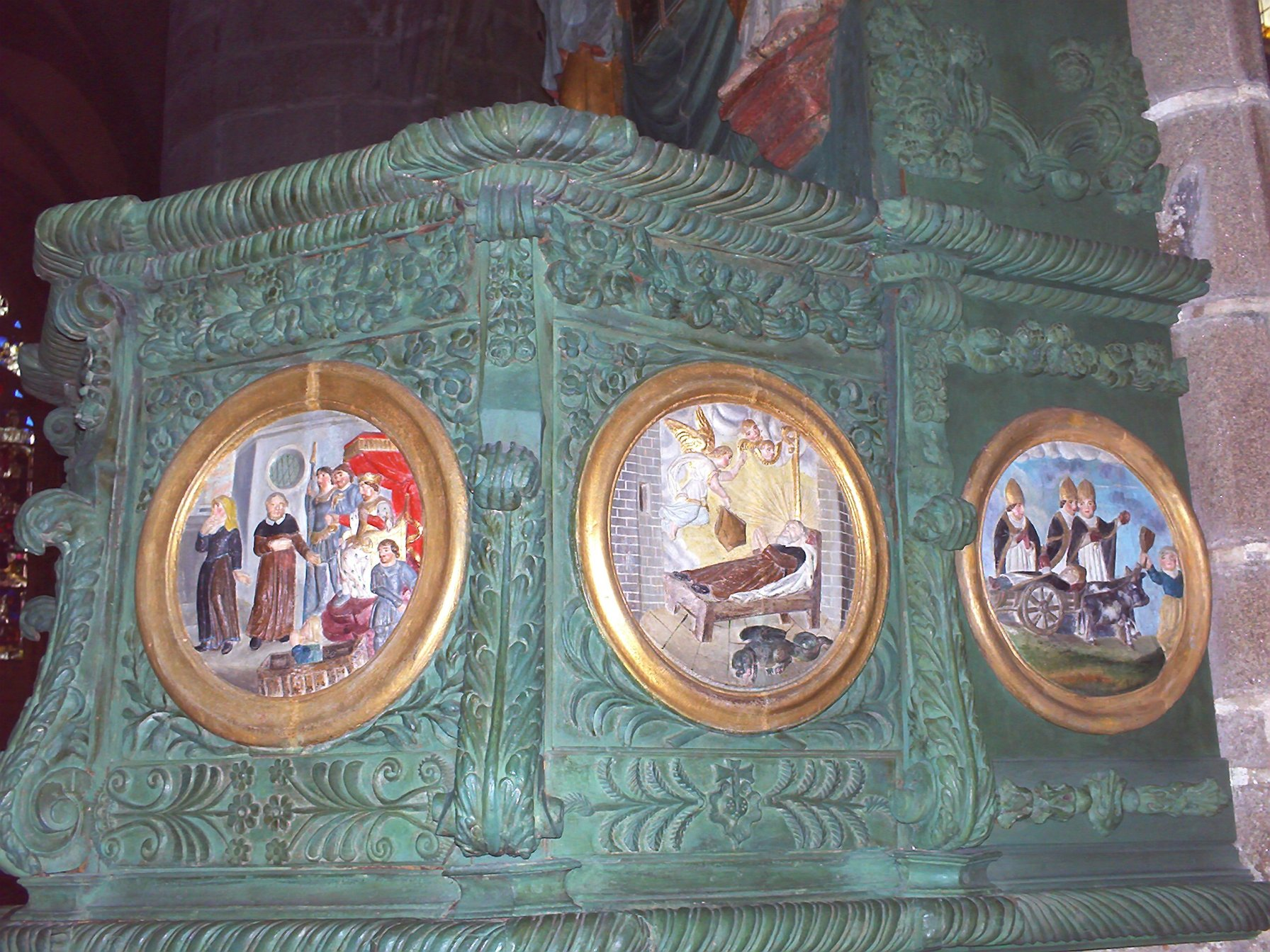
More scenes from the life of St Ronan on the pulpit.

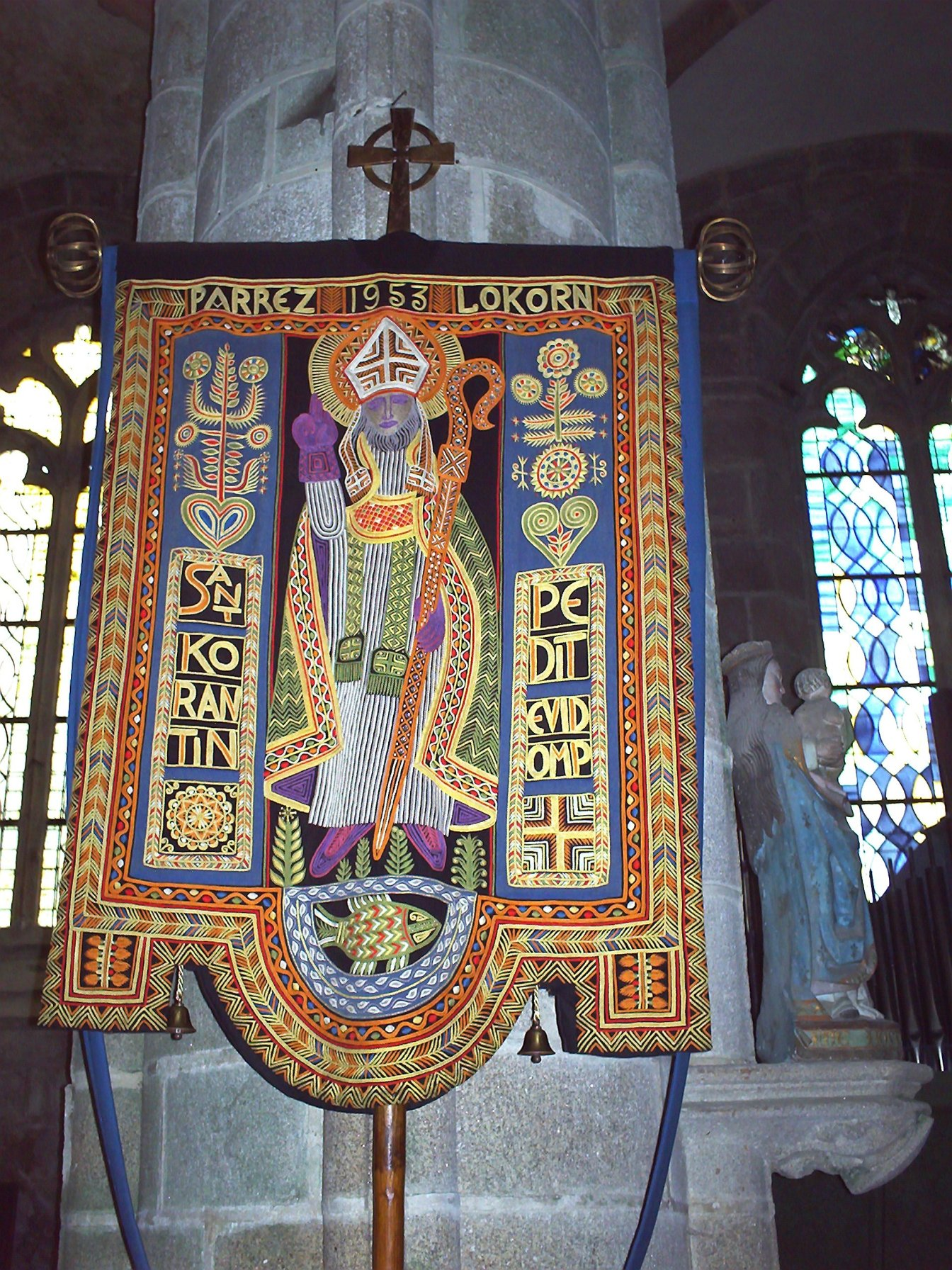
The banner of St Corentin of Quimper at Locronan.

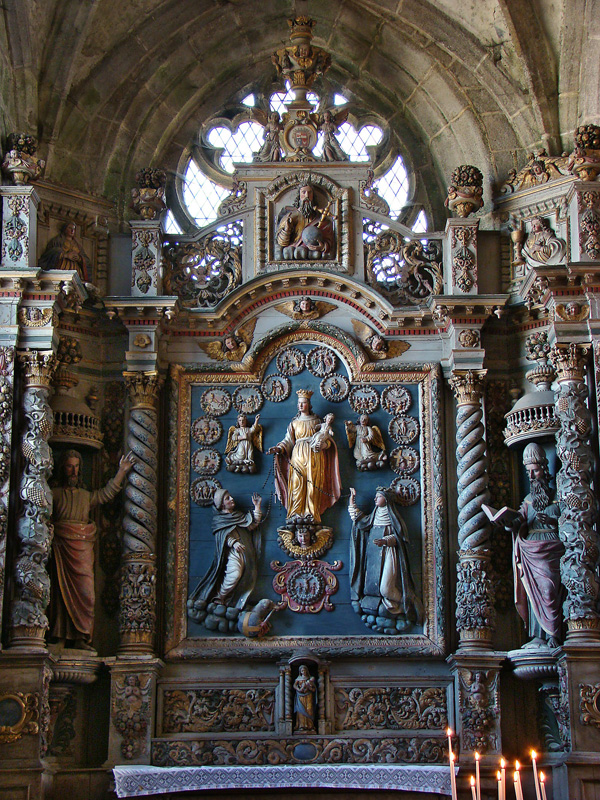
Altar of the Rosary.

== See also ==
- Communes of the Finistère department
- List of works of the two Folgoët ateliers
- Locranon Parish close
