= Locronan Parish close =

Church located in Finistère, in France

Coordinates: 48.0983°N 4.2079°W

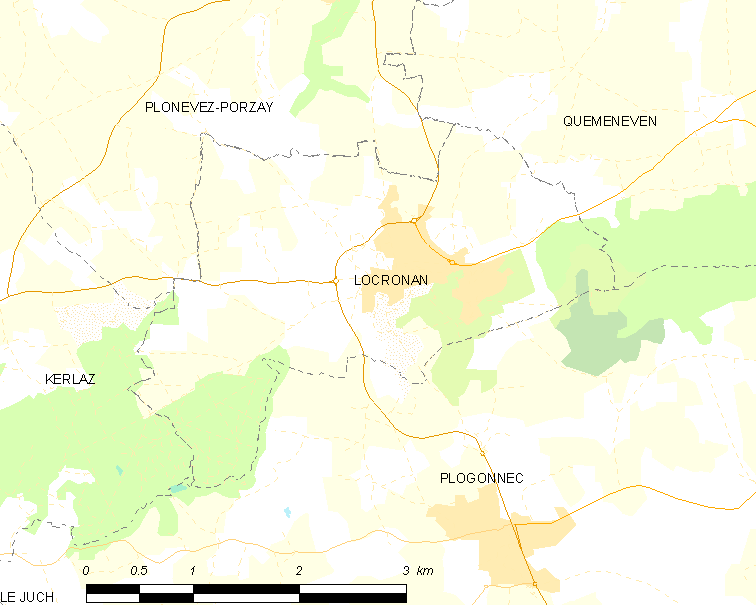
Map showing location Locronan

The enclos paroissial or Parish close of Locronan comprises the parish church with adjoining chapel and a calvary. The article will also cover the nearby chapelle Notre-Dame-de-Bonne-Nouvelle. Locronan is a member of the Les Plus Beaux Villages de France ("The most beautiful villages of France") association. The village's name means the "hermitage of Ronan", from the Breton lok which means hermitage, and after the founder Saint Ronan. It has previously been known as Saint-René-du-Bois. Saint Ronan is greatly venerated in Brittany. He was an Irish Christian missionary of the 6th century who came to the region to teach Christianity. As a consequence of Saint Ronan's close association with Locronan some of his relics are kept in the parish church. Locronan is located in the Châteaulin arrondissement of Finistère.

== The parish church ==
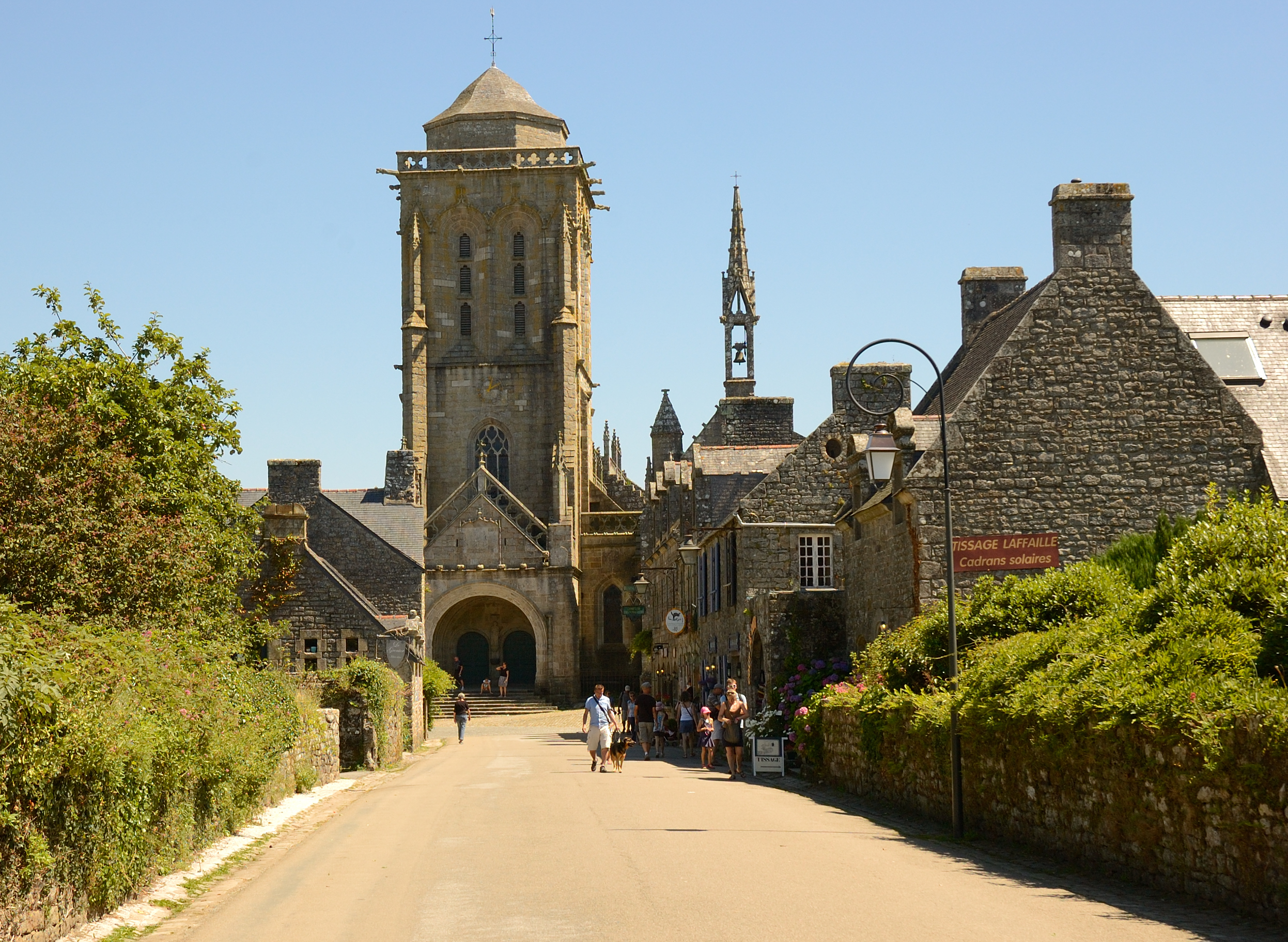
The parish church at Locronan

The église Saint-Ronan was built in the fifteenth century, building taking place between 1420 and 1424 in the reign of Jean V and finishing in 1477 in the reign of François II, the father of Anne de Bretagne. The church is rectangular in shape with a nave of six bays with aisles. At the southern end of the nave, two large arcades lead to the Chapelle du Pénity where the tomb of Saint Ronan is located. Building of the Chapelle du Pénity was started in 1485 and finished in around 1515. Inside the Saint-Ronan church there is the Rosary altarpiece, the work of the Landerneau painter and sculptor Maurice Le Roux and dating to 1668. The 1707 pulpit is the work of the carpenter Louis Bariou and the sculptor Guillaume Le Poupon, and is decorated with médaillons depicting scenes from the life of Saint Ronan. The baptismal fonts are carved from granite and date to the fifteenth century and the church has organs installed by Thomas Dallam in 1672. The great window in the church's chevet depicts 17 scenes from the passion and the window's final panel carries the arms of the Névet family. The tomb of Saint Ronan is carved from kersantite and dates to the fifteenth century. Other statuary in the church is a sixteenth-century "Déploration du Christ" in polychromed kersantite, a statue of Saint Roch in polychromed granite dating to 1509, a statue of Saint Michael in granite dating to the end of the fifteenth century, and an alabaster statue of Notre-Dame de Délivrance dating to the fifteenth century. The church also holds statues of Saint Ronan, Saint Corentin of Quimper, Saint Yves/Ivo of Kermartin, Saint Alar/Saint Eligius, Saint Apollonia, Sainte-Marguerite, Saint Maurice abbé, Saint Anthony, Saint Christopher, Saint Eutrope, Saint Fiacre, Mary Magdalene, Sainte Barbe, the Virgin Mary and John the Evangelist, Sainte Anne, Saint Louis and a pietà.

== The calvary ==
The calvary at Locronan is a simple one and stands in the church cemetery. It is 6 metres high and dates to the sixteenth century. It has marmosets carved half way up the shaft of the cross and at the top the crucifix is reversed with a depiction of the resurrected Jesus. There is also a sculpture depicting the Virgin Mary reversed with Saint Peter and John the Evangelist reversed with a bishop, these on either side of the central crucifix.

== The "Rosary" altarpiece ==
This was the work of the Maurice La Roux workshop in Landerneau and dates to 1668. The altarpiece with twisted columns on either side is decorated with fifteen miniature medallions telling the story of the "mysteries of the Rosary". In the centre is a statue of a crowned Virgin Mary with Saint Dominic on one side and Saint Catherine of Siena on the other. To the left is a statue of Saint Joseph and to the right Saint Joachim. In a niche at the altarpiece's base is a small sculpture of the Virgin Mary.

== The chevet window with scenes from the Passion (Christianity) ==
This window dates to around 1480 and tells the story of the passion in a total of 17 tableau with the Marquis de Nevet depicted in the final panel. The window was a gift of Francis II the father of Anne de Bretagne. The window has a statue of John the Evangelist and the Virgin Mary on either side, these in polychromed wood and dating to the seventeenth century. There is also a granite polychromed statue of Saint Ronan in the attire of s bishop to the right of the chevet window and to the left is a statue of Saint Corentin, this in polychromed wood. Saint Corentin was a contemporary of Saint Ronan who was the first bishop of Quimper and the patron saint of the diocese.

== The statue of Saint Roch ==
The statue is signed on its supporting pedestal by the sculptor R.Guillimin. The statue is polychromed and carved from granite. He holds a racloir in his right hand and in his left holds a loaf of bread. An angel is at his feet and touches the racloir whilst a dog has given him the bread.

== The tomb of Saint Ronan ==
In the chapelle du Pénity is a flagstone carved in kersanton stone by the Folgoët atelier for the tomb of Saint Ronan. (The word kersanton is an obsolete local name from the village of Kersanton, Brittany for kersantite.) It is thought to date to between 1423 and 1433. On the flagstone is an effigy gisant of the saint in the attire of a bishop. A lion is depicted at his feet bearing five coats of arms. The flagstone is laid upon and supported by six caryatid/angels and appears to rest on their wings. Saint Ronan holds his right hand up giving a blessing and in his other hand he holds a highly ornate cross the base of which is inserted into the lion's mouth. His head lies on a cushion with an angel with closed wings reclining on each side of the cushion. The caryatids were added to the tomb at a later stage. The saint's remains are held in Quimper cathedral but some relics are held at Locronan, placed near the tomb. See also List of works of the two Folgoët ateliers.

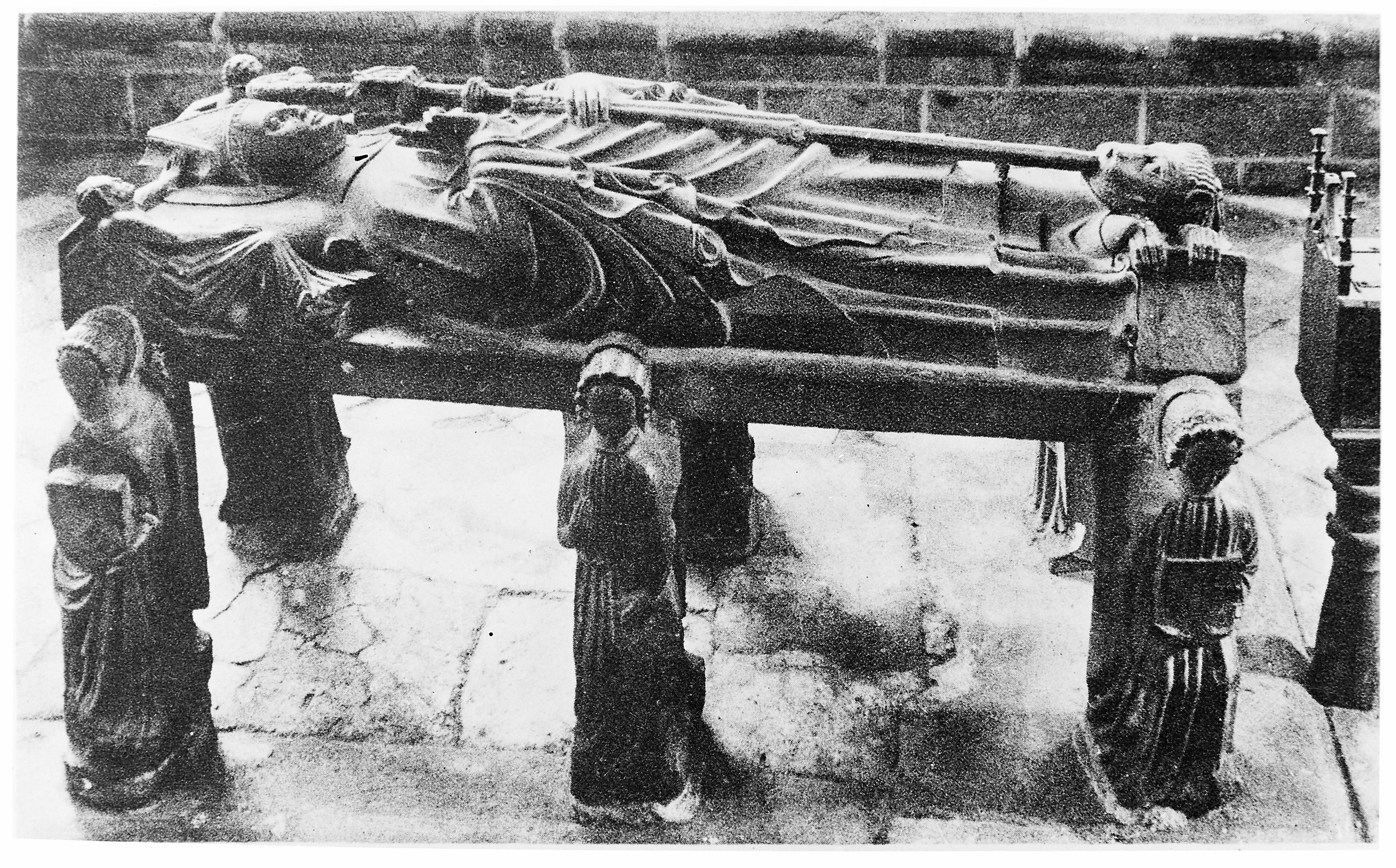
View of the flagstone depicting Saint Ronan. Note how the end of his cross has been pushed into the mouth of the lion resting at his feet, its paws placed on a blazon. A reclining angel is placed by Ronan's head.

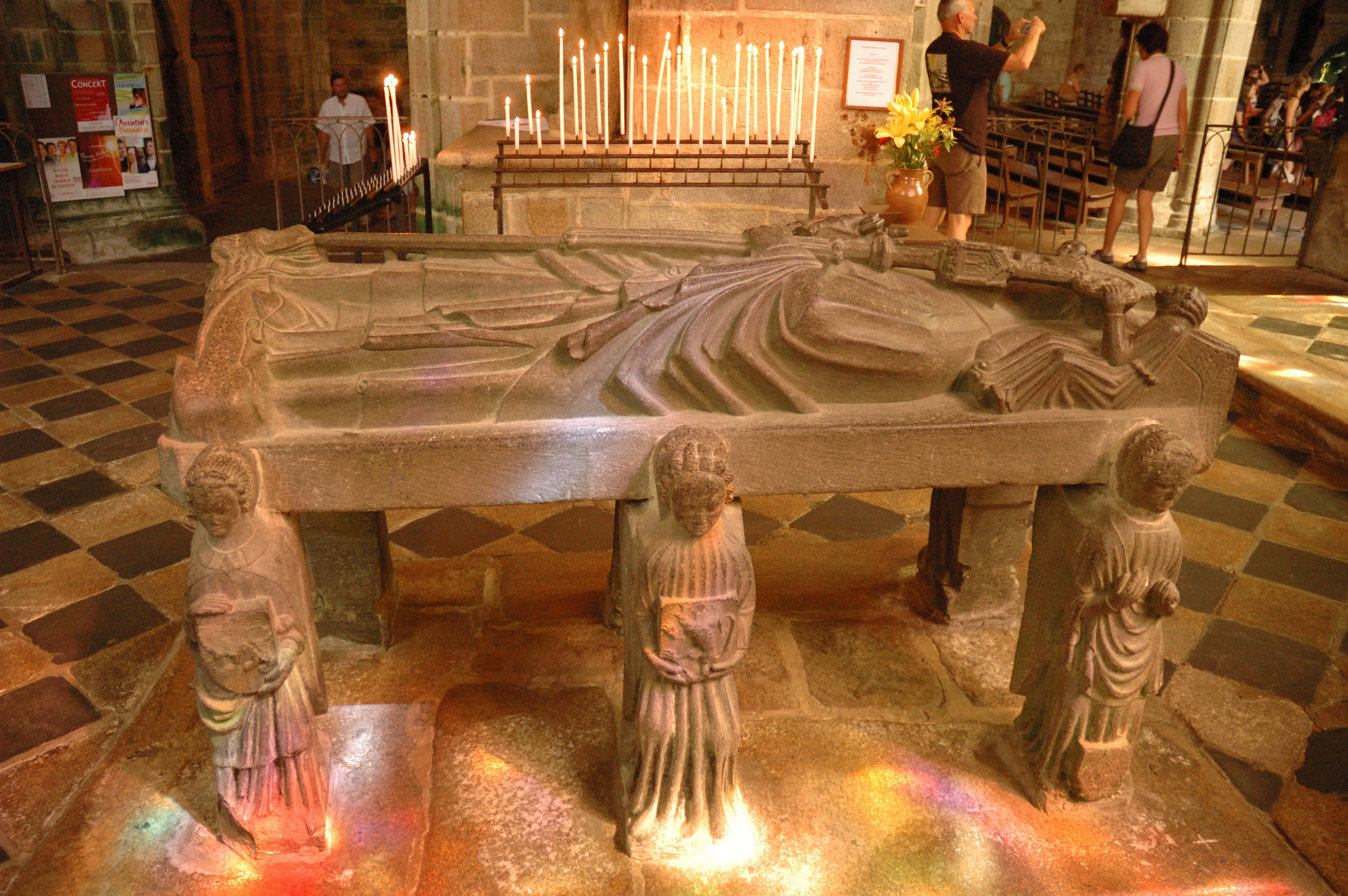
The flagstone depicting Saint Ronan viewed from the other side. The second reclining angel by Ronan's head is touching the top of the cross.

== Gallery of images ==
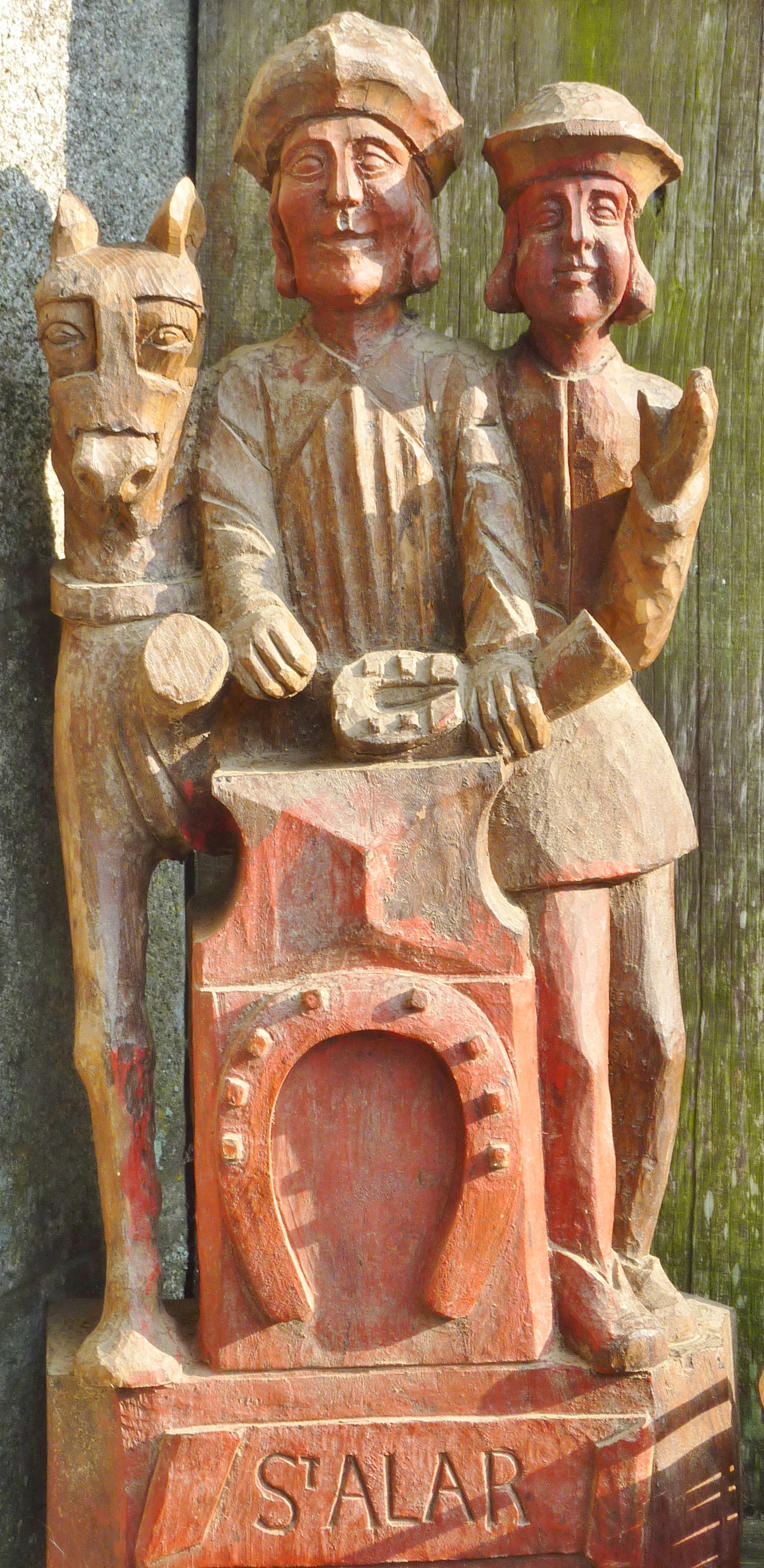
A carving in wood depicting Saint Alar

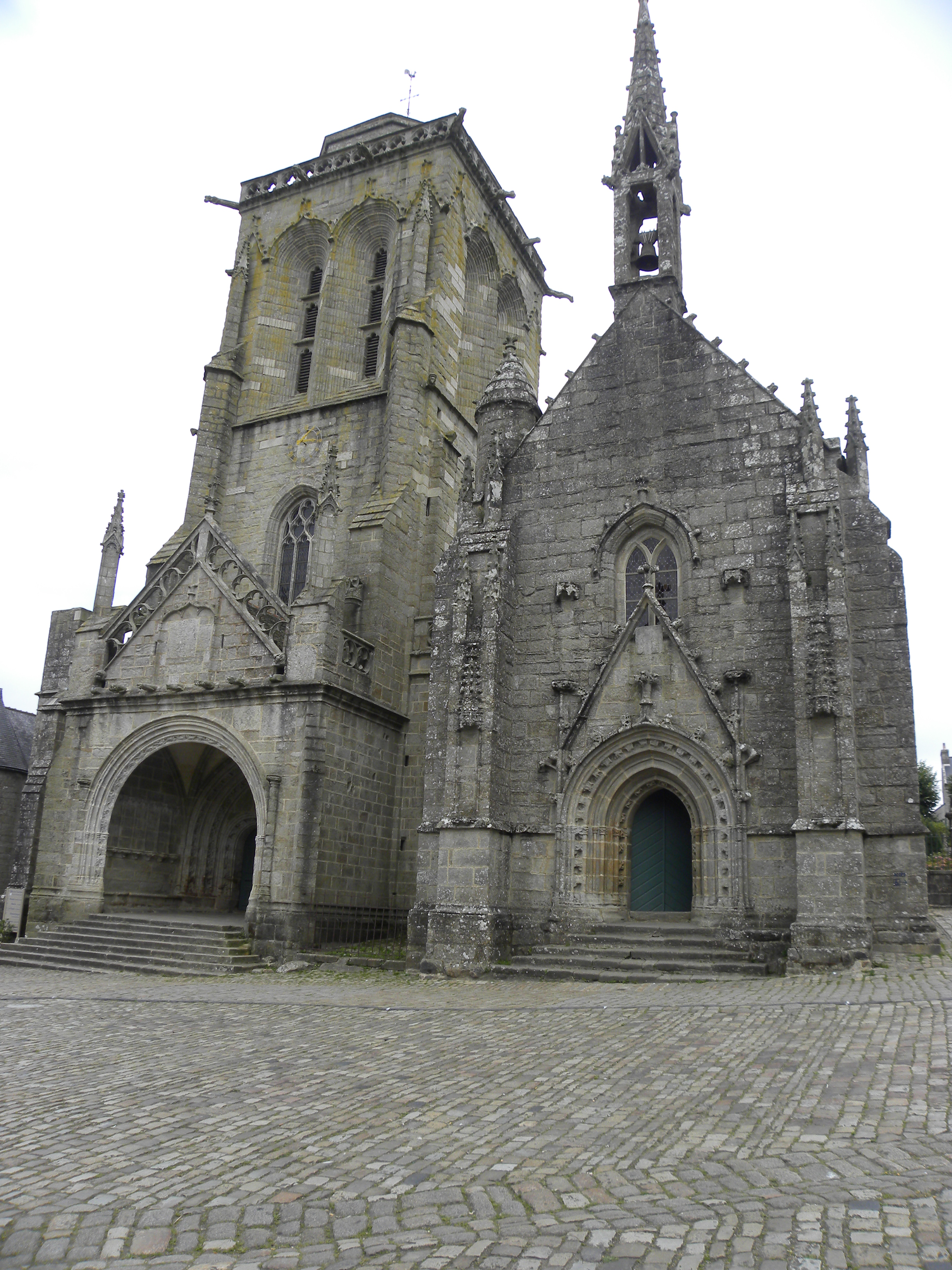
View of the parish church and the Chapelle de Pénity attached to it

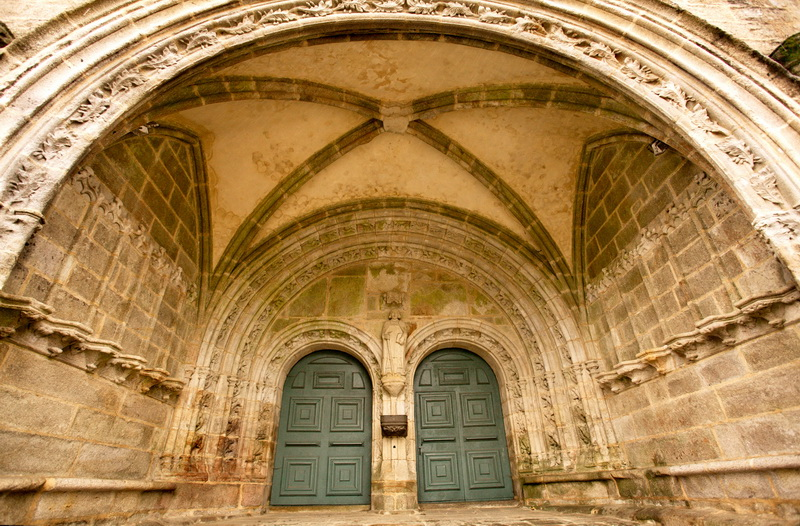
The main porch leading to the double-doored entrance to the church.

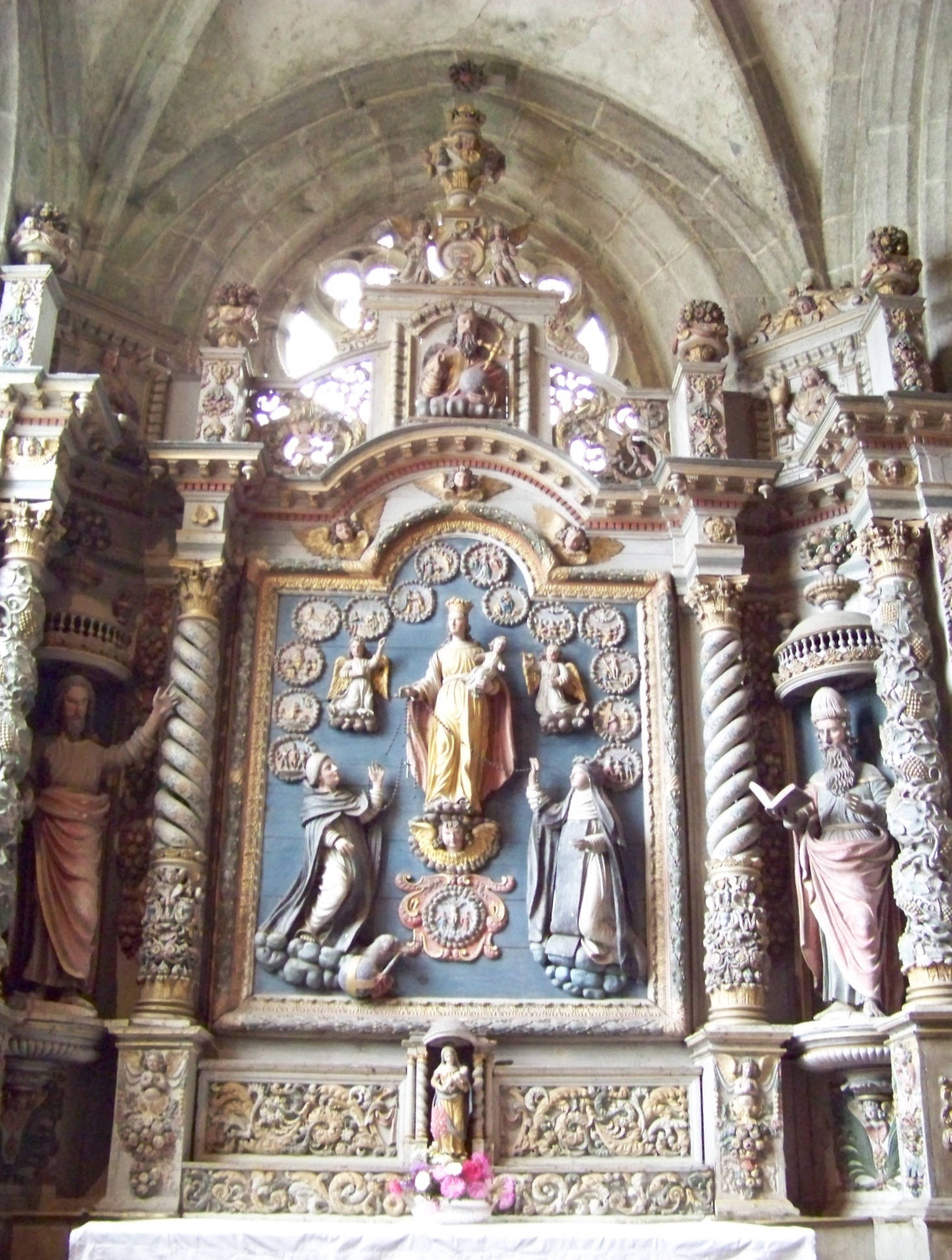
The "Rosary" altarpiece. Note the crowned Virgin Mary in the centre and below her Saint Dominic and Catherine of Sienna. To the left we see Saint Joachim and to the right Saint Joseph.

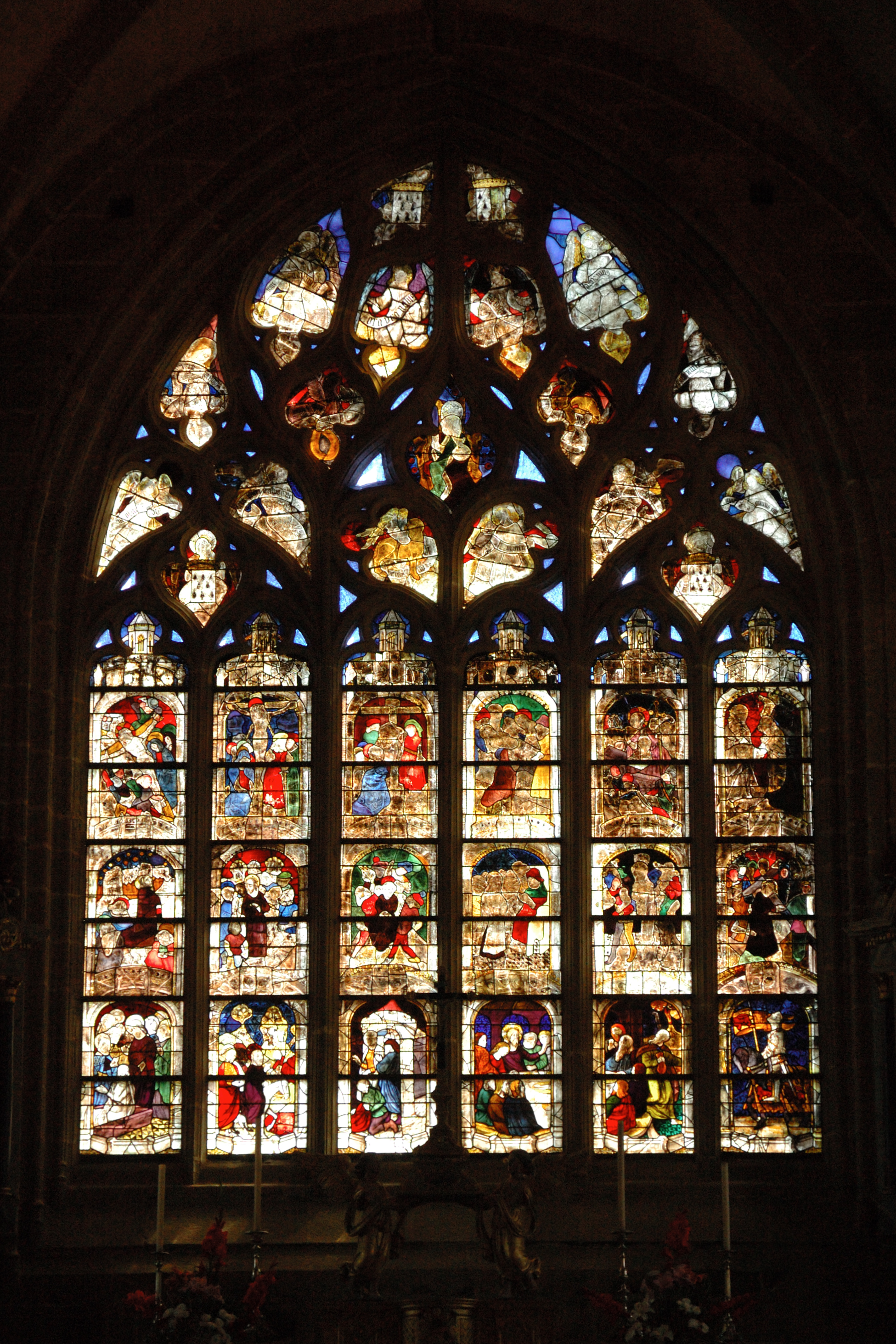
The chevet window with scenes from the Passion (Christianity). Scenes in the top row depict the raising of Lazarus, the entry into Jerusalem, the last supper and Joan of Arc on horseback. In the next row is a scene depicting Jesus in the garden of olives, then his arrest and his being ridiculed, his appearance before Herod, the flagellation with Jesus tied to a tree, the carrying of the cross. In the lower row are two scenes involving the crucifixion, then Jesus being brought down from the cross and the preparation for his burial (the "Mise au Tombeau" followed by Jesus resurrected and emerging from the tomb and then his descent into limbo to save some souls trapped there

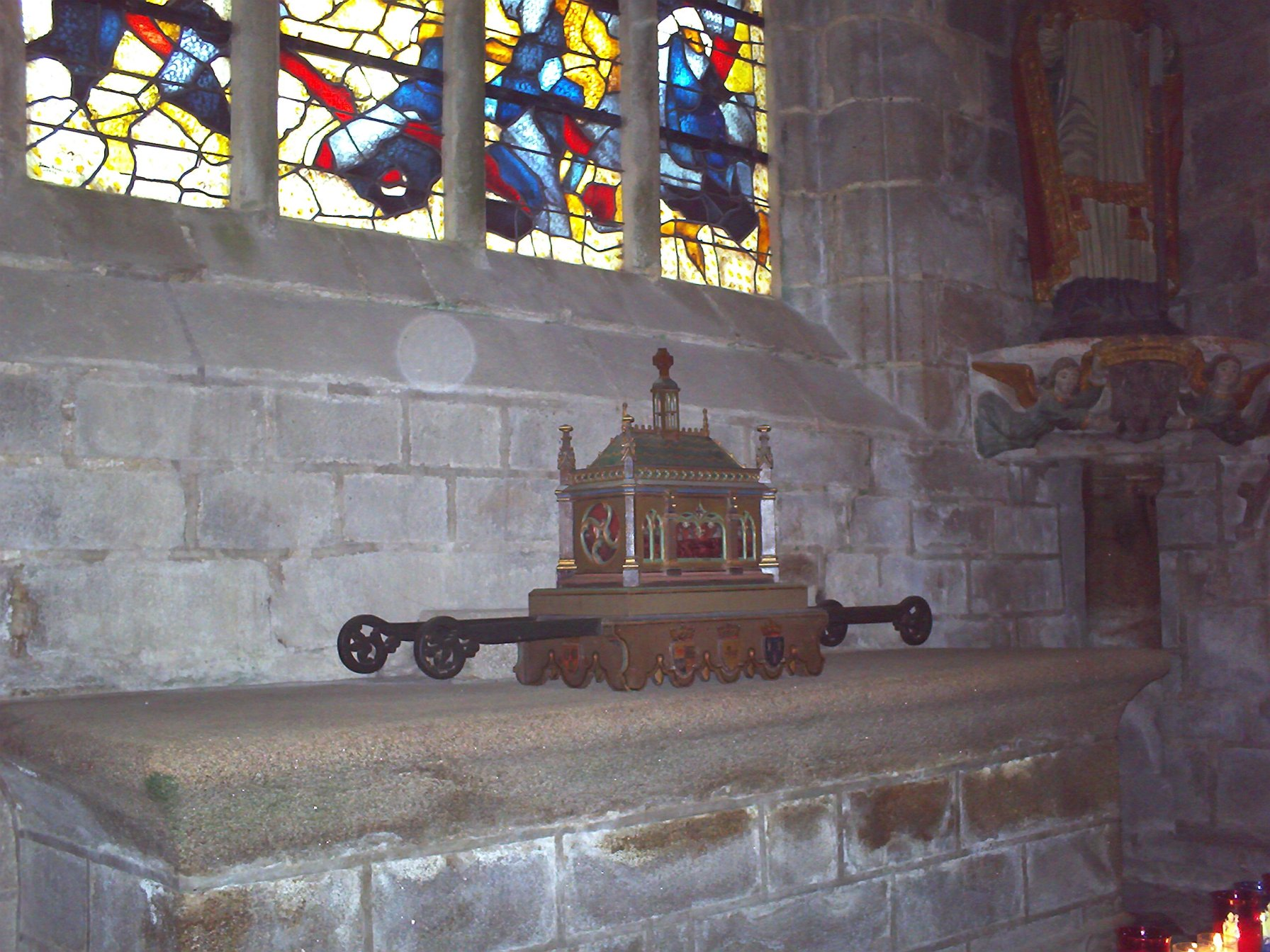
Some of Saint Ronan's relics

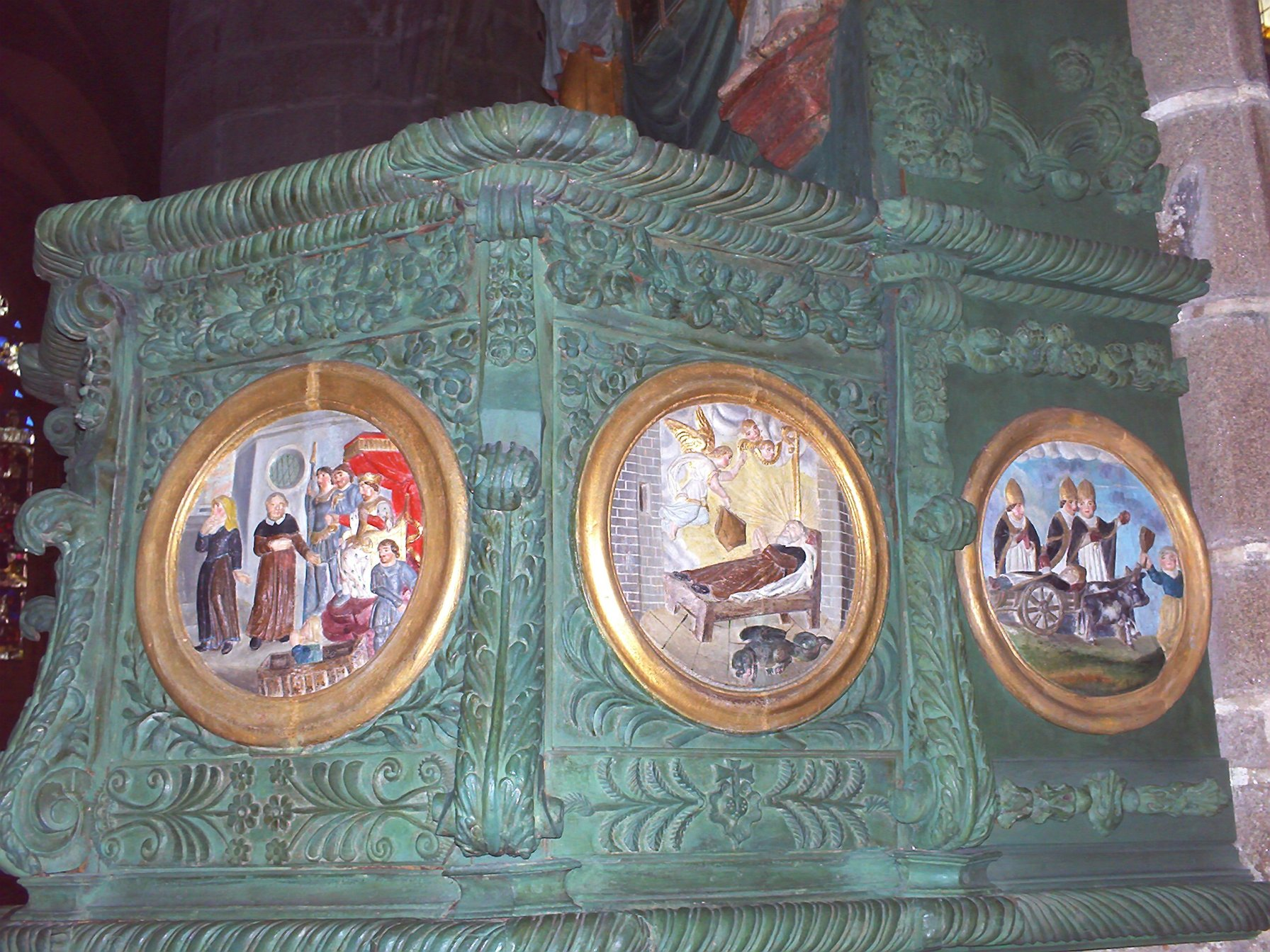
The pulpit at the église Saint Ronan.

== The chapelle Notre-Dame-de-Bonne-Nouvelle ==
This chapel dates to the fifteenth century. It contains several statues including the descente de croix mentioned below. The stained glass windows are modern and are by Alfred Manessier and date to 1985. The bell tower is of eighteenth-century vintage and the calvary and fountain date to 1698 and were dedicated to the hemp merchant J.Conan. The chapel has a limestone calvary which is 5 metres high and features two angels collecting the crucified Jesus' blood.

== The descent from the cross ==
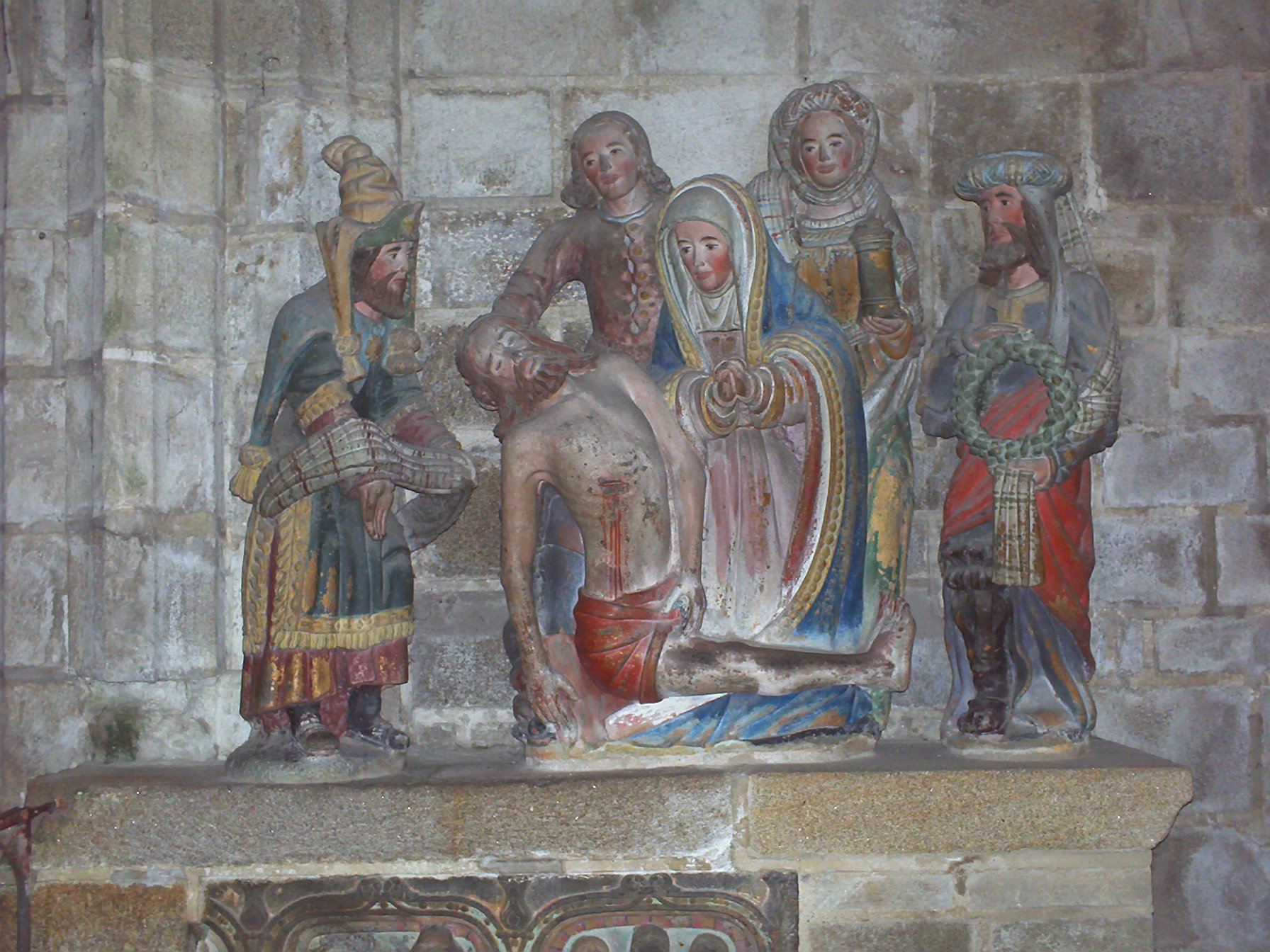
The descent from the cross at Penity

There are two versions of this sixteenth-century pietà or as it is called here "The descent from the cross" in Locronan. One is to be seen in the chapelle du Pénity and the other in the chapelle Notre-Dame-de-Bonne-Nouvelle, which lies to the southwest of the village. Both compositions involve six people, and the Notre-Dame-de-Bonne-Nouvelle is reckoned to be a copy of that at Penity. Both use kersanton stone. The latter is still polychromed whilst the polychrome has disappeared from the former. In both sculptures Joseph of Arimathea and Nicodemus surround the Virgin Mary who is supported by John the Evangelist. Mary Magdalen stands to the rear. Joseph of Arimathea holds the shroud which will cover Jesus' body. In the Pénity version, Nicodemus holds the crown of thorns but this has broken off and is missing in the Notre-Dame-de-Bonne-Nouvelle work. At Notre-Dame-de-Bonne-Nouvelle the Virgin Mary does not lean towards the body as at Pénity and at Pénity John the Evangelist supports Jesus' head. In the Pénity pietà Mary Magdalene wears a Medici-type costume whilst Nicodemus wears clothes that were worn in the reign of Henry II. On the front of the pedestal at Pénity are two bas-reliefs carved from kersanton stone, these depicting the resurrected Jesus meeting with Mary Magdalene and the disciples at Emmaus.

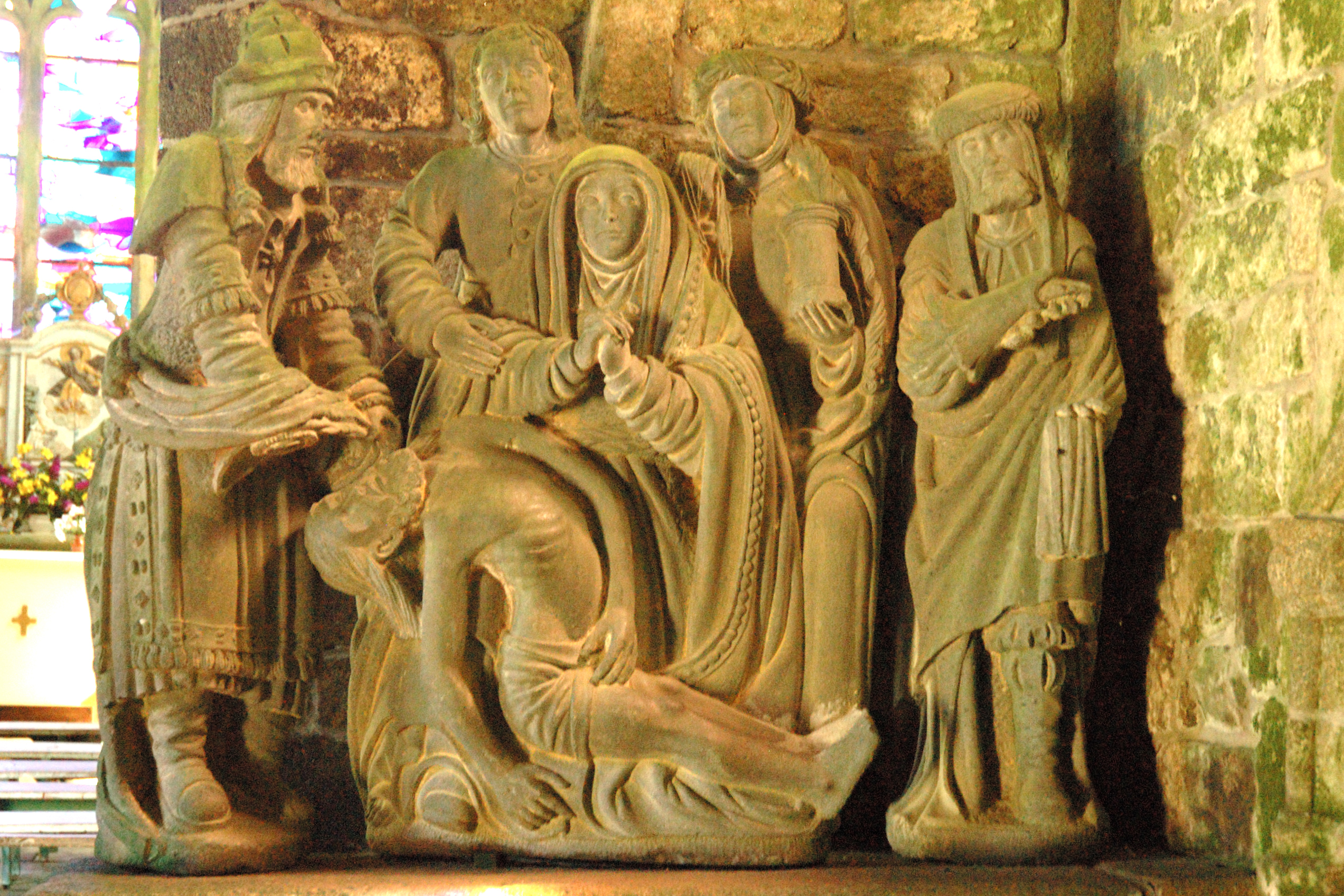
The descent from the cross at Notre-Dame-de-Bonne-Nouvelle
