= Rónán =

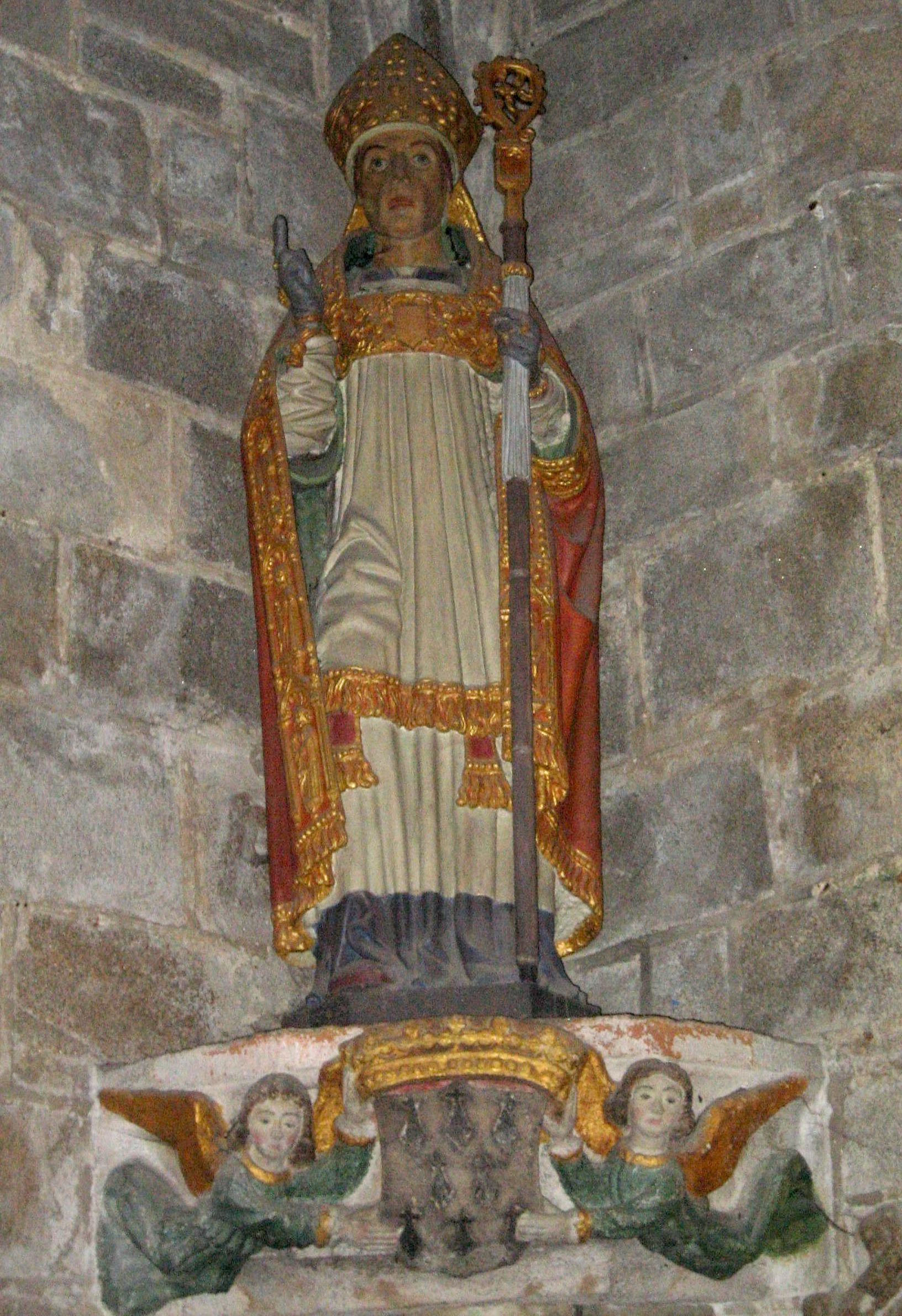
- Statue of Saint Ronan
- Pronunciation: English: /ˈroʊnən/ Irish: [ɾˠoːˈnˠaːnˠ]
- Gender: Male
- Language: Irish, English

Rónán, anglicised as Ronan, is an Irish and Breton male given name and surname derived from rón, the Irish word for 'seal'. The given name dates back to Primitive Irish in the form ᚏᚑᚅᚐᚅᚅ [ᚋᚐᚊ ᚉᚑᚋᚑᚌᚐᚅᚅ] (RONANN [MAQ COMOGANN]), found as an ogham inscription which translates as 'Rónán, son of Comgán'.

In Irish Mythology, the name is derived from a legend, which tells the story of a mother seal who is warned never to stray too closely to the land. When the seal is swept ashore by a huge wave, she becomes trapped in a human form, known as a "selkie" or "seal maiden". Although she lives as the wife of a fisherman and bears him children, known as "ronans" or "little seals", she never quite loses her "sea-longing". Eventually, she finds the "seal-skin" which the fisherman has hidden and slips back into the ocean. However, she cannot forget her husband and children and can be seen swimming close to the shore, keeping a watchful and loving eye on them.

== Saints with given name ==
There are twelve Irish saints bearing the name of Ronan commemorated in the Martyrology of Donegal, many of which may also have been named Ruadhán. These include:

- Ronan of Locronan, a c. 6th century Irish pilgrim saint and hermit in western Brittany
- Rónán Mac Bearaigh (died 665), founder of Druim Inesclainn (Drumshallon) (see Féchín of Fore).
- Rónán of Ulster, brother of St. Carnech, and grandson of Loarn, died 11 January 535.
- Rónán Fionn is honoured as patron of Lan Ronan (Kelminiog) in Iveagh. His feast is celebrated on 22 May, both in Ireland and Scotland.
- Rónán of Iona is explicitly referred to by Bede in the controversy with his countryman St Finan of Lindisfarne, Bishop of Lindisfarne, 660. This controversy, on the calculation of the date of Easter, was ended at the Synod of Whitby, in 664, when Rónán's views were upheld. This is the saint referred to in the title of Sir Walter Scott's book, Saint Ronan's Well. Scott's St. Ronan was a Celtic monk, Bishop of Kilmaronen, who advocated the use of the Roman rather than Celtic manner. This St Rónán is also the patron saint of the Scottish town of Innerleithen. He is commemorated as a saint in the Eastern Orthodox Church on 7 February.
- Rónán of Lismore was a successor of St. Carthage, and several Munster churches were built in his honour. His feast is celebrated on 9 February 763.
- Another saint of this name is best known by the ruined church of Kilronan (Irish: Cill Rónáin), Co. Roscommon, where Turlogh O'Carolan and Bishop O'Rourke are buried.

== People with the given name ==
- Ronan Bennett (born 1956), Northern Irish writer
- Ronan Biger (born 1985), French football midfielder
- Ronan Cordeiro (born 1997), Brazilian para-triathlete
- Ronan & Erwan Bouroullec, Breton designers
- Ronan Falcão (born 1985), Equatoguinean footballer
- Ronan Farrow (born 1987), American writer and activist
- Ronan Hanafin (born 2004), American football player
- Ronan Hardiman (born 1962), Irish composer
- Ronan Harris (born 1967), Irish musician
- Ronan Hughes (born 1998), Scottish footballer
- Ronan Huon (1922–2003), Breton writer
- Ronan Keane (born 1932), Irish judge
- Ronan Keating (born 1977), Irish singer
- Ronan Keenan (1932–2007), South African writer
- Ronan Kratt (born 2003), Canadian-American soccer player
- Ronan Labar (born 1989), French badminton player
- Ronan Lee (born 1976), Australian politician
- Ronan Leprohon (1939–2017), French, Breton politician
- Rónán Mac Aodha Bhuí (born 1970), Irish broadcaster
- Rónán mac Colmáin (died 605), Irish king
- Rónán Mullen (born 1970), Irish politician
- Ronan O'Brien (born 1974), Irish writer
- Ronan O'Gara (born 1977), Irish rugby player
- Ronan O'Rahilly (1940–2020), Irish businessman
- Rónán Ó Snodaigh (born 1970), Irish musician
- Ronan Pallier (born 1970), French Paralympian athlete
- Ronan Parke (born 1998), British singer
- Ronan Pensec (born 1963), Breton cyclist
- Ronan Racault (born 1988), French road cyclist
- Ronan Rafferty (born 1964), Northern Irish golfer
- Ronan Sheehan (born 1953), Irish writer
- Ronan Thompson (2007–2011), American who died of neuroblastoma cancer and subject of Taylor Swift song "Ronan"
- Ronan Tynan (born 1960), Irish tenor and Paralympian
- Ronan Vibert (1964–2022), British actor

== People with the surname ==
- Alfred Ronan (born 1947), American politician
- Colin Ronan (1920–1995), British astronomer and writer
- Daniel J. Ronan (1914–1969), American politician
- Ed Ronan (born 1968), Canadian ice hockey player
- Frank Ronan (born 1963), Irish writer
- George Ronan, first graduate of West Point to die in action
- Kian Ronan (born 2001), Gibraltarian footballer
- Niall Ronan (born 1982), Irish rugby player
- Saoirse Ronan (born 1994), Irish and American actress
- Susan Ronan (born 1964), Irish footballer
- William Ronan (1912–2014), American public servant and academic

== Fictional characters ==
- Ronan the Accuser, a fictional character in Marvel comic books
- Ronan Erudon, in the massively multiplayer online role-playing game Grand Chase
- Ronan Lynch, in The Raven Cycle series of fantasy novels by Maggie Stiefvater
- Ronan Malloy, in the American soap opera The Young and the Restless
- The title character of Ronan the Barbarian, a 1995 novel by James Bibby
- Alyson and Tyler Ronan, the lead characters of the game Tell Me Why

== See also ==
- List of Irish-language given names
- Ronon Dex, a fictional character in the Stargate Atlantis television series
