= Ronan the Barbarian =

1995 novel by James Bibby

- Author: James Bibby
- Working title: Ronan and the Singing Sword
- Cover artist: Stephen Player
- Language: English
- Genre: Comic fantasy
- Published: 1995 (Millennium)
- Publication place: United Kingdom
- Media type: Print and digital
- Pages: 260
- ISBN: 1-85798-282-7
- Followed by: Ronan's Rescue

Ronan the Barbarian is a comic fantasy novel by James Bibby, first published in 1995 by Millennium. It is the first book in a trilogy, followed by Ronan's Rescue and Ronan's Revenge. It is also the first work set in Bibby's Midworld, a fictional universe constructed to parody common high fantasy and sword and sorcery genre tropes.
