= Ronan of Locronan =

Irish saint

Saint Ronan
- Renan, Ronan the Silent
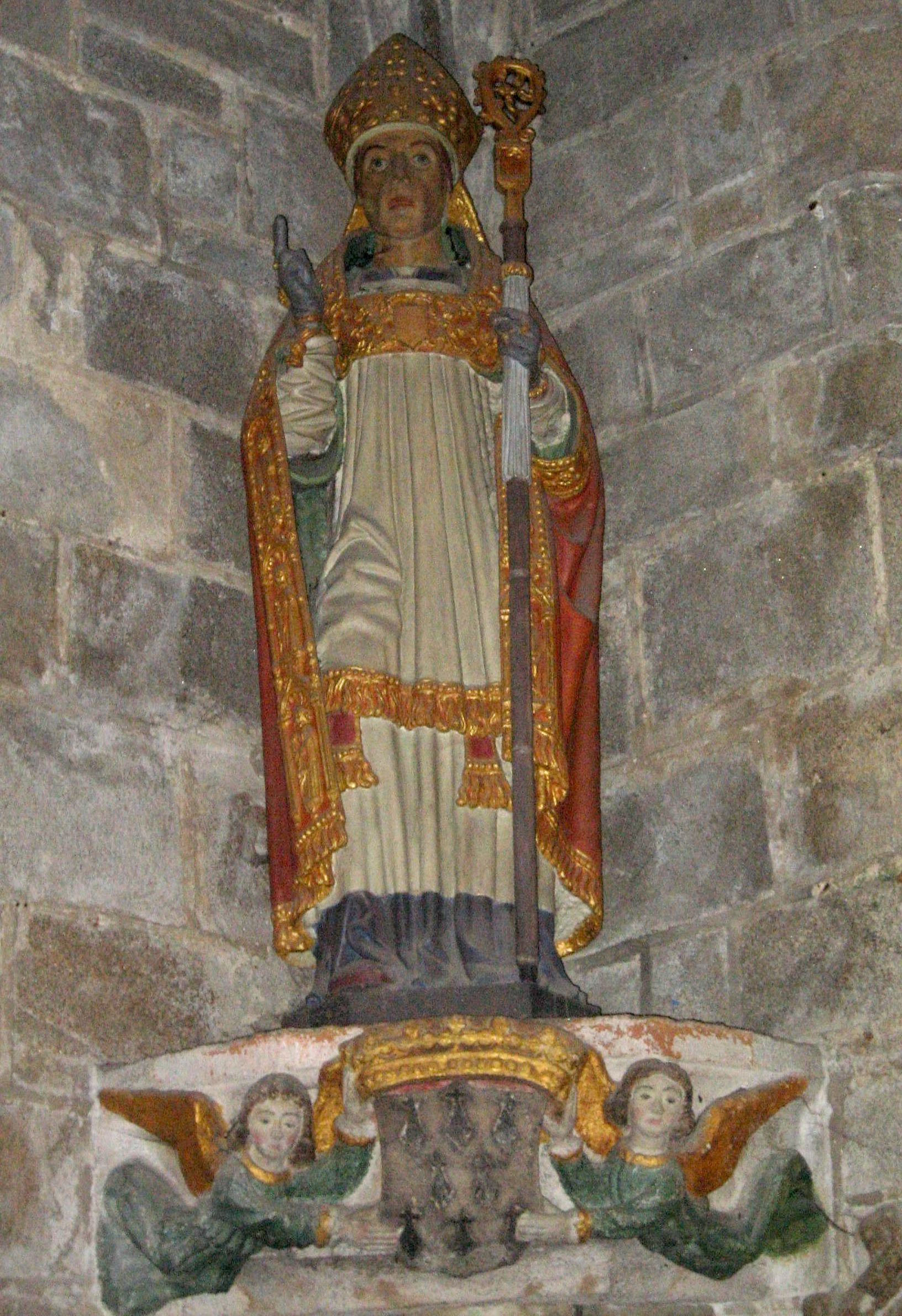
- Saint Ronan statue in Locronan church (Brittany, France)

Personal details
- Buried: Locronan

Sainthood
- Feast day: 1 June
- Patronage: Locronan, Quimper

Saint Ronan (fl. c. sixth century?) was an Irish pilgrim saint and hermit in western Brittany. He was the eponymous founder of Locronan and co-patron of Quimper (France), together with its founder, Saint Corentin. He is also celebrated in the parish of Kilronan, Ireland

== From Locronan to Quimper ==
The village of Locronan (lit. "the place of Ronan"), which is located about 17 km northwest of Quimper, owes its name to its reputed founder, the Irish pilgrim Ronan. To judge by his entry in the cartulary of the abbey of Quimper, he is known to have been venerated at Locronan since at least the 1030s.

At some later stage, his remains were translated to the nearby abbey of Quimper, whose patron saint was St Corentin. This must have occurred by 1274 at the latest, when the abbey produced an inventory mentioning the saint's body and head among its cherished relics.

Sometime in the same century, a Latin life of the saint, the Vita S. Ronani, was written at Quimper to familiarise the local community with the origins of the saint and his posthumous importance for the town through the miracles wrought by his relics.

== Synopsis of Ronan’s earliest Life ==
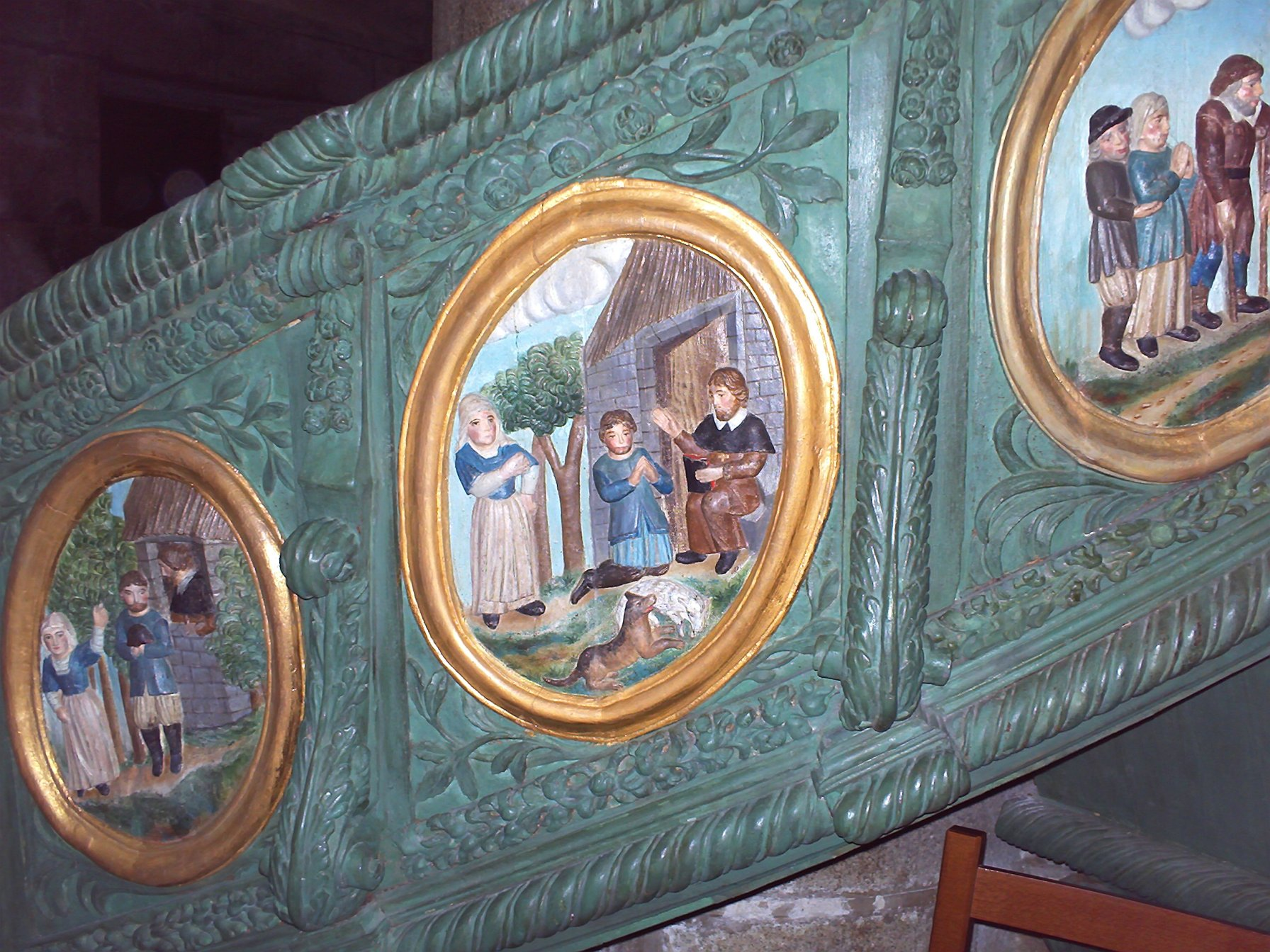
Scenes from the life of St Ronan on the polychrome pulpit at the Locronan parish church. One scene portrays the episode in which Keban charged the saint with lycanthropy.

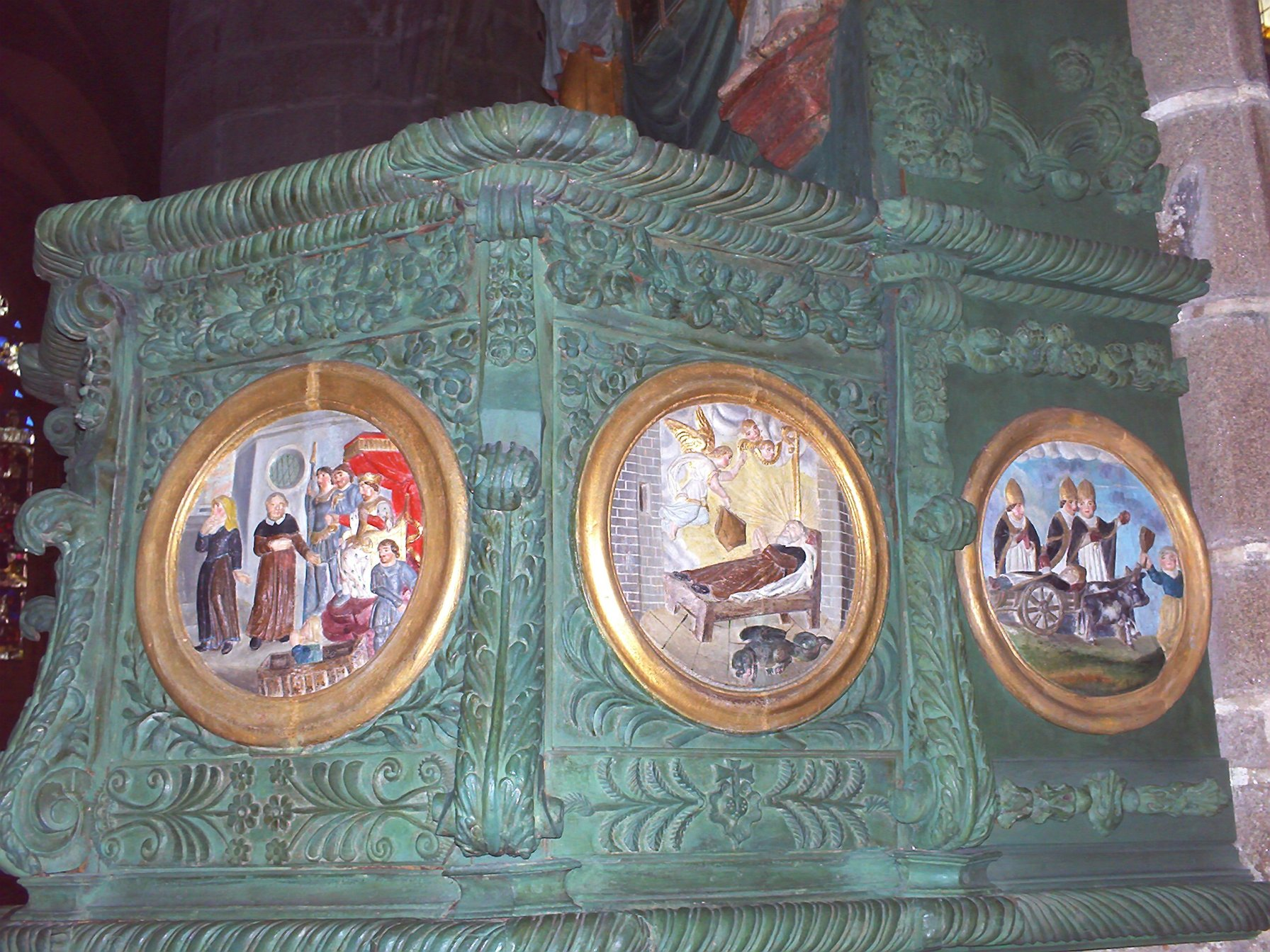
More scenes on the Locronan pulpit. The discovery of his daughter hidden in a chest is shown in the first picture. The dragging of his body to Locronan is in the third picture.

=== Life ===
The text begins by telling that Ronan was a well-educated native of Ireland whose good works as a bishop had brought him great renown in his home country (§ 1). However, he longed to have a closer communion with God and so, at the height of his career in Ireland, he chose voluntary exile, per Genesis 12:1–3, by severing all ties with kin and country and embarking on a voyage to Brittany. Having landed "in the region of Léon", he continued his journey southwards to the kingdom of Cornouaille (Latin Cornubia) and set up a hermitage at what would become known as Locronan, near the woods of Névez. Here he devoted himself to prayer and an ascetic way of life, through which he soon attracted a multitude of admirers from the region (§ 2). In this way, his presence also came to the attention of Gradlon, king of Cornouaille and a prominent figure in Breton legend (§ 3).

A local peasant much admired the saint, offering hospitality and paying frequent visits to his cell, but Keban, the peasant's wife, grew jealous and devised a scheme to bring the holy man into disrepute (§ 4). Before Gradlon at his court in Quimper, she openly accused the saint, saying that he was a sorcerer who could transform himself into a wild animal and that, in the shape of a wolf, he had devoured numerous sheep and her only daughter (§ 5). Ronan was put to the test to prove his sanctity. First, the king's two ferocious dogs were unleashed on him, but by the token of Christ, Ronan managed to pacify them (§ 6). Second, he was given the opportunity to account for the disappearance of the peasant's daughter. He revealed that Keban had locked up her own daughter in a place so small that she had stifled to death, and named the exact location (§ 7). When the girl was found dead just as the saint had told, local citizens insisted on Keban's execution. Ronan, however, prevented this, preferring to practise Christian benevolence, and brought the dead girl back to life (§ 8). In spite of this, the saint continued to be harassed by Keban's malice and therefore left for the petty kingdom of Domnonia in northwest Brittany, where he settled near Hillion (§ 9). He died in his cell (§ 10).

=== Miracles and cult ===
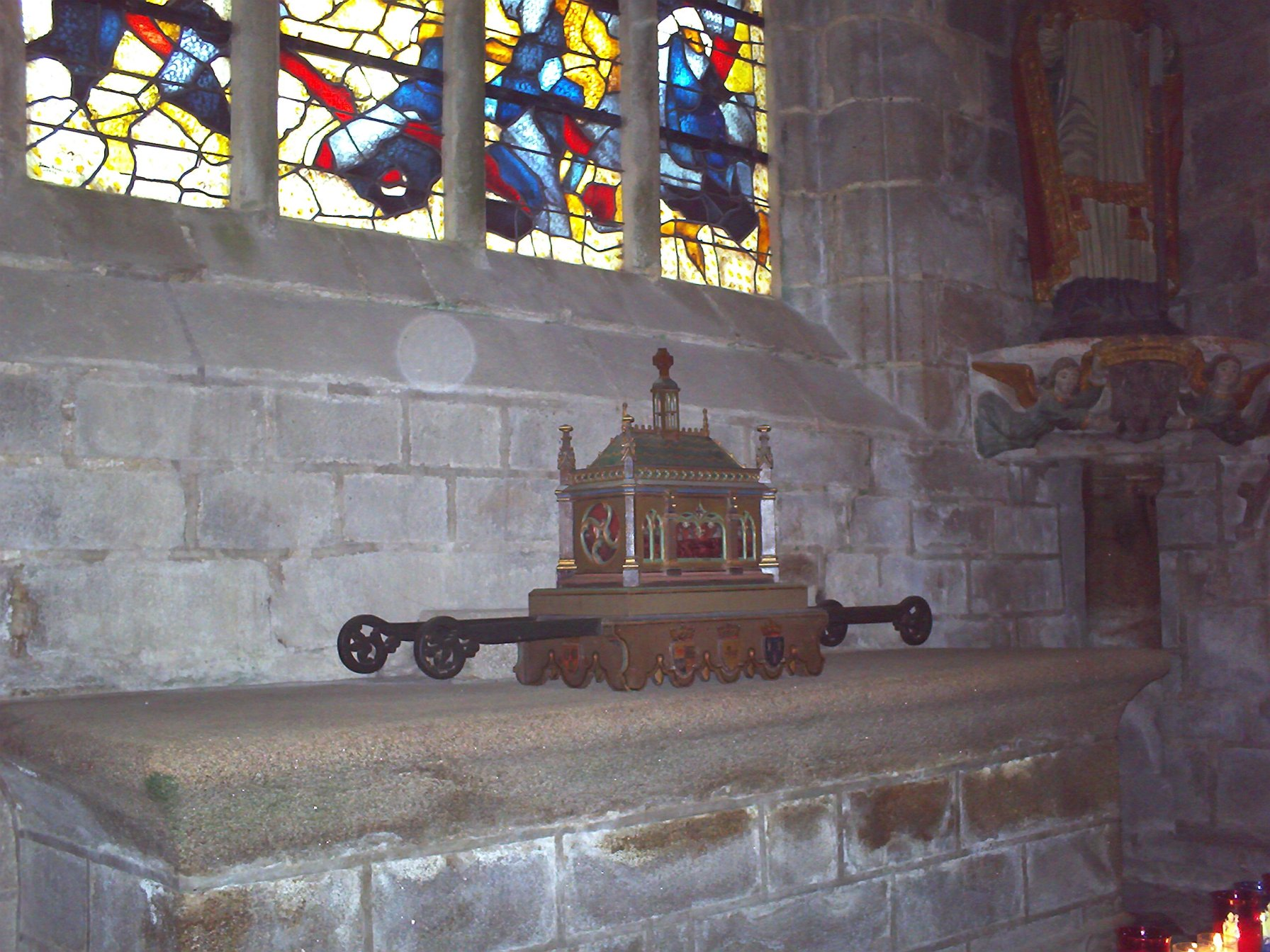
Reliquary of St Ronan at Locronan

The second part of the text focuses on events after Ronan's death, his miracles, the growth of his cult and the fate of his relics. Since he died outside of Cornouaille, a quarrel arose over where to bury his body. The issue was decided by placing the body on a cart, dragged by wild oxen, and leaving it for them to drag wherever they would. The king of Cornouaille proved to be the only person able to lift the body and place it on a bier, which healed his arm of an old wound. The wild oxen driving the cart walked straight to the saint's cell in the forest of Névez. There the body was interred and the little settlement of Locronan grew up around the burial place (§ 11).

The text subsequently makes a few leaps through time. It is said, for instance, that following a wave of Viking incursions, a new chapel was built at the site (§ 12). Without giving any explicit explanation, the final chapters relate that the saint's relics were at some date translated, with appropriate pomp, to Quimper (Latin Confluentia). The presence of his relics in the town and the control over them by the clergy led to a series of miracles. One man is said to have been cured of dumbness after praying at the altar on which the saint's relics were placed; another was freed from demonic possession after spending a night under the saint's shrine; and the town was spared destruction by fire when the clergy used the relics to ward off the flames (§ 12–15).

Although at Quimper, Ronan was only an 'imported' saint next to the native saint Corentin, so the manifestation of his presence through such tangible means as his relics gave him one advantage in his favour. Possession of Ronan's relics and the written word gave the clergy distinct instruments by which to defend and promote the saint's cult. By contrast, Corentin enjoyed a strong local cult, which was little disturbed by the loss of relics and did not depend for its survival on the production of a written Life (though one was produced).

== Early Modern period ==
Albert Le Grand, in his Lives of the Saints of Brittany (1636), and the Bollandists produced biographies of the saint.

== Festival ==
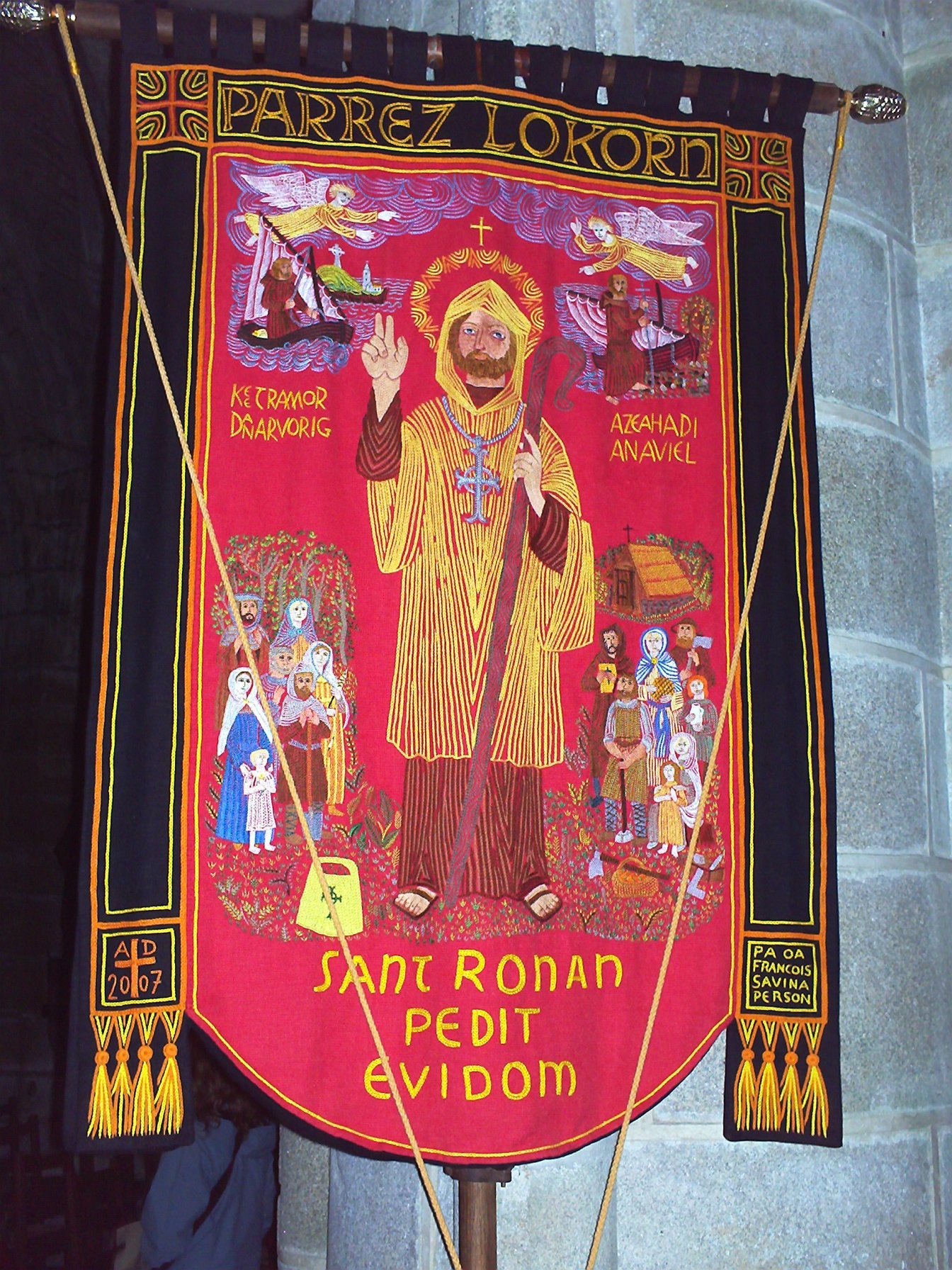
St Ronan, pictured on the banner of the parish church of Locronan, Brittany. The banner will be used particularly on the saint's feast day, 1 June, and on the Troménies or pardons held at Locronan in July.

Ronan's feast day is celebrated on 1 June.

=== La grande Troménie ===
The Grande Tromenie happens every six years, with Petite Tromenies every year. The tromenies are the Locronan equivalent of the "pardons" which take place throughout Brittany. The Grande Tromenie goes around the hill tracing the boundary of the 12th-century Benedictine priory. The priory was a place of retreat, thus the name of the "pardon" is Tro Minihi or "Tour of the Retreat", Gallicized as Tromenie.

== See also ==
- Locranon Parish close
