= List of twin towns and sister cities in Wales =

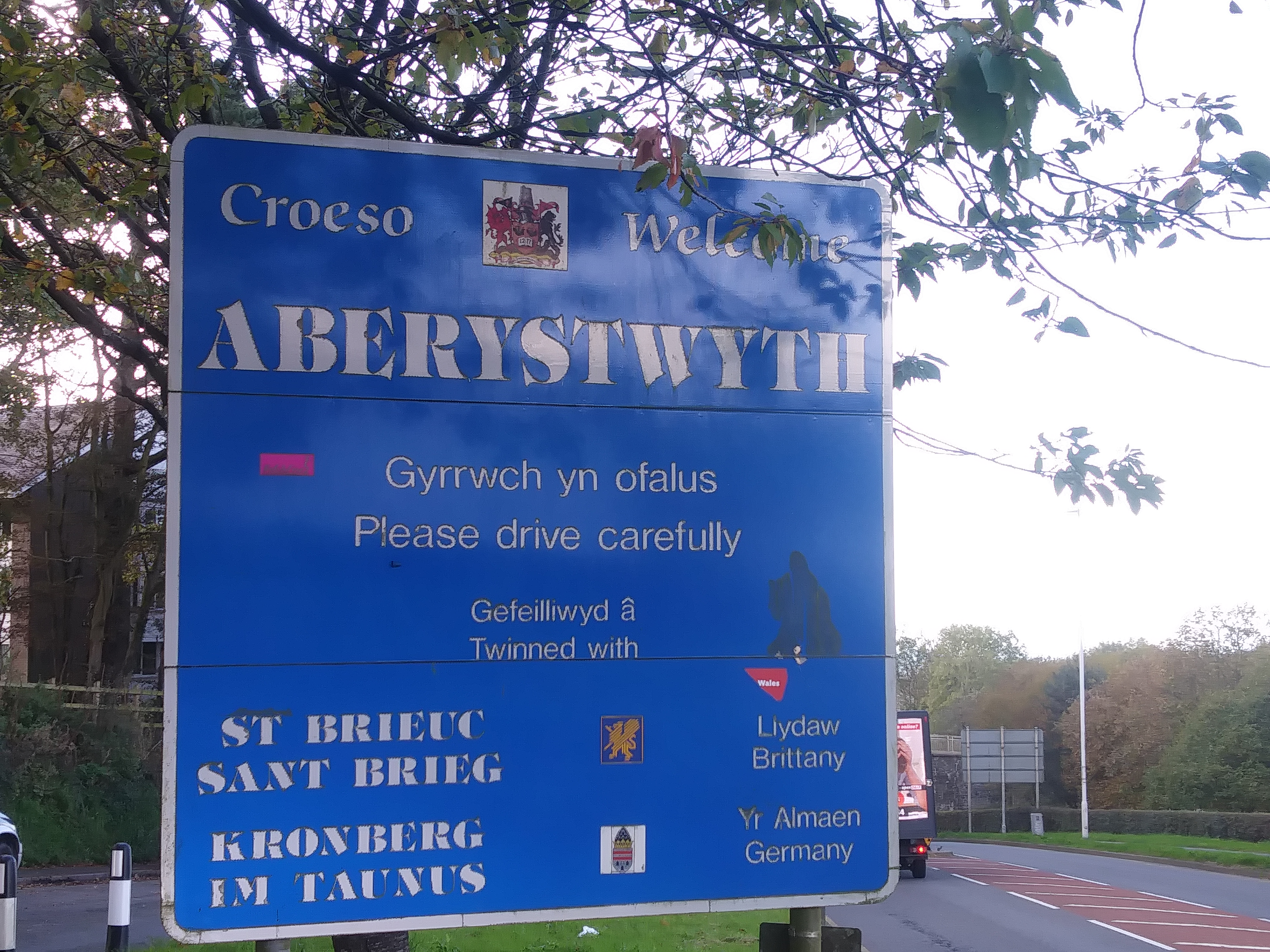
Sign in Aberystwyth with its twin towns

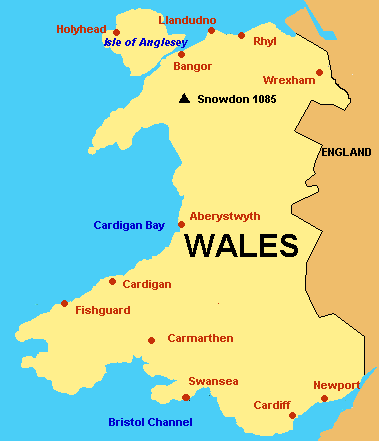
Map of Wales

This is a list of places in Wales which have standing links to local communities in other countries known as "town twinning" (usually in Europe) or "sister cities" (usually in the rest of the world).

== A ==
Abergavenny

- Beaupréau-en-Mauges, France
- Östringen, Germany

Abergele

- Roissy-en-Brie, France

Abertillery

- Royat, France

Aberystwyth

- (Republic of Ireland) Arklow, Ireland
- Esquel, Argentina
- Kronberg im Taunus, Germany
- Saint-Brieuc, France

== B ==
Bala

- Bala (Muskoka Lakes), Canada

Bagillt

- Laxey, Isle of Man

Bangor

- Soest, Germany

Blackwood

- Protivín, Czech Republic

Blaenavon

- Coutras, France

Blaenau Gwent

- Oberhausen-Rheinhausen, Germany

Brecknockshire

- Blaubeuren, Germany

Brecon

- Dhampus, Nepal
- Gouesnou, France
- Saline, United States

Bridgend

- Langenau, Germany
- Villenave-d'Ornon, France

Briton Ferry

- Ouagadougou, Burkina Faso

Broughton and Bretton

- Auzeville-Tolosane, France

Brynmawr

- Camors, France

== C ==
Caernarfon

- Landerneau, France
- Trelew, Argentina

Caerphilly

- Ludwigsburg, Germany
- Písek, Czech Republic

Caldicot

- Morières-lès-Avignon, France
- Waghäusel, Germany

Cardiff

- Luhansk, Ukraine
- Nantes, France
- Stuttgart, Germany
- Xiamen, China

Cardigan

- Brioude, France
- Trevelin, Argentina

Carmarthen

- As Pontes de García Rodríguez, Spain
- Lesneven, France

Colwyn Bay

- Roissy-en-Brie, France

Cowbridge

- Clisson, France

Crickhowell

- Scaër, France

Crymych

- Hlotse, Lesotho
- Plomelin, France

Cwmaman

- Pouldergat, France

Cwmbran

- Bruchsal, Germany

== D ==
Denbigh

- Biebertal, Germany

Dolgellau

- Guérande, France

== F ==
Fishguard and Goodwick

- Loctudy, France

Flintshire

- Menden, Germany

== G ==
Glynneath

- Pont-Évêque, France

Gorseinon

- Ploërmel, France

Govilon

- Missillac, France

Gowerton

- La Gacilly, France

== H ==
Haverfordwest

- Oberkirch, Germany

Hay-on-Wye

- Redu (Libin), Belgium
- Timbuktu, Mali

Holyhead

- (Republic of Ireland) Greystones, Ireland

Holywell

- Saint-Grégoire, France

== I ==
Isle of Anglesey

- (Republic of Ireland) Dún Laoghaire, Ireland

== K ==
Kidwelly

- Saint-Jacut-de-la-Mer, France

== L ==
Llanberis

- Morbegno, Italy

Llanbradach

- Ploubezre, France

Llandeilo

- Le Conquet, France

Llandovery

- Pluguffan, France

Llandrindod Wells

- Bad Rappenau, Germany
- Contrexéville, France

Llandudno

- Champéry, Switzerland
- Wormhout, France

Llandybie

- Plonéour-Lanvern, France

Llandysul

- Plogonnec, France

Llanelli

- Agen, France

Llanfairfechan

- Pleumeleuc, France

Llangedwyn

- Omerville, France

Llanidloes

- Derval, France

Llantrisant

- Crécy-en-Ponthieu, France

Llantwit Major

- Le Pouliguen, France

Llanwrtyd Wells

- Český Krumlov, Czech Republic
- Mériel, France

Llwchwr

- Ploërmel, France

== M ==
Machen

- Sautron, France

Machynlleth

- Belleville, United States

Milford Haven

- Romilly-sur-Seine, France
- Uman, Ukraine

Monmouth

- Carbonne, France
- Waldbronn, Germany

Monmouthshire

- Karlsruhe (district), Germany

Mumbles

- Havre de Grace, United States
- Hennebont, France

== N ==
Narberth

- Ludlow, England, United Kingdom

Nefyn

- Puerto Madryn, Argentina

Newcastle Emlyn

- Plonévez-Porzay, France

Newport

- Heidenheim an der Brenz, Germany
- (Georgia (country)) Kutaisi, Georgia

Newport, Pembrokeshire

- Annapolis, United States
- Plouguin, France

Newtown

- Les Herbiers, France

Neyland

- Sanguinet, France

Norton

- Ligné, France

== P ==
Pembroke

- Bergen, Germany
- Pembroke, Malta

Pembroke Dock

- Bergen, Germany
- Pembroke, Malta

Penarth

- Saint-Pol-de-Léon, France

Pencoed

- Plouzané, France
- Waldsassen, Germany

Pontardawe

- Locminé, France

Pontarddulais

- (Republic of Ireland) Cobh, Ireland

Pontypool

- Bretten, Germany
- Condeixa-a-Nova, Portugal
- Longjumeau, France

Porthcawl

- Ploudalmézeau, France
- Saint-Sébastien-sur-Loire, France

Porthmadog

- (Republic of Ireland) Wicklow, Ireland

Presteigne

- Ligné, France

== R ==
Radyr and Morganstown

- Saint-Philbert-de-Grand-Lieu, France

Raglan

- Parcé-sur-Sarthe, France

Rhondda Cynon Taf

- Montélimar, France
- Nürtingen, Germany
- Ravensburg, Germany
- Wolfenbüttel (district), Germany

Ruthin

- Briec, France

== S ==
St Asaph

- Bégard, France

St Clears

- Peillac, France

St Davids

- Matsieng, Lesotho
- (Republic of Ireland) Naas, Ireland
- Orléat, France

St Dogmaels

- Trédarzec, France

Swansea

- (Republic of Ireland) Cork, Ireland
- Ferrara, Italy
- Mannheim, Germany
- Pau, France
- Sinop, Turkey
- Wuhan, China

== T ==
Torfaen

- Karlsruhe (district), Germany

Tredegar

- Orvault, France

Tregaron

- Plouvien, France

== U ==
Usk

- Graben-Neudorf, Germany

== V ==
Vale of Glamorgan

- Fécamp, France
- Mouscron, Belgium
- Rheinfelden, Germany

== W ==
Whitland

- Pipriac, France

Wrexham

- Märkischer (district), Germany
- Racibórz County, Poland

== Y ==
Ystradgynlais

- Clarks Summit, United States
