= Quéménéven Parish close =

Coordinates: 48.1153°N 4.1205°W

The Quéménéven Parish close comprising the parish church, a triumphal arch and calvary is located in the arrondissement of Châteaulin in Finistère in Brittany. The bell tower and the western façade of the church are a listed historical monument since 1969.

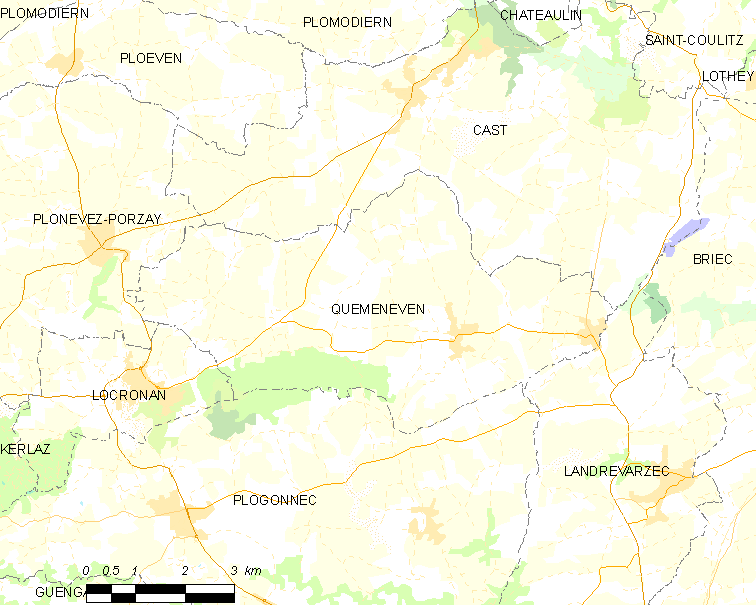
Map showing location of Quéménéven

== The Église Saint-Ouen ==
This, the Quéménéven parish church and originally dating back to 1786, was reconstructed between 1860 and 1861. The church has a nave of three bays with aisles, a transept and choir.

== The stained-glass window known as the "Crucifixion" window ==
A 16th-century-stained glass window depicts the "Passion of Jesus Christ".

== The porch ==
In a niche above the porch entrance is a statue of Saint Ouen.

== Statuary ==
The church has statues of Saint Méen in the attire of a bishop, Saint Peter, Saint Guénolé (a polychromed woodcarving dating to the 16th century), Saint Enéour, Saint Ouen and Saint Lawrence. Méen was a Breton saint, thought to be Cornish or Welsh in origin.

== The calvary ==
The Calvary attached to the parish church is 6 metres in height and statues of John the Evangelist and the Virgin Mary are back-to-back with the people in the Pietà. At the summit of the Calvary a depiction of the crucifixion includes an angel touching Jesus' hair.

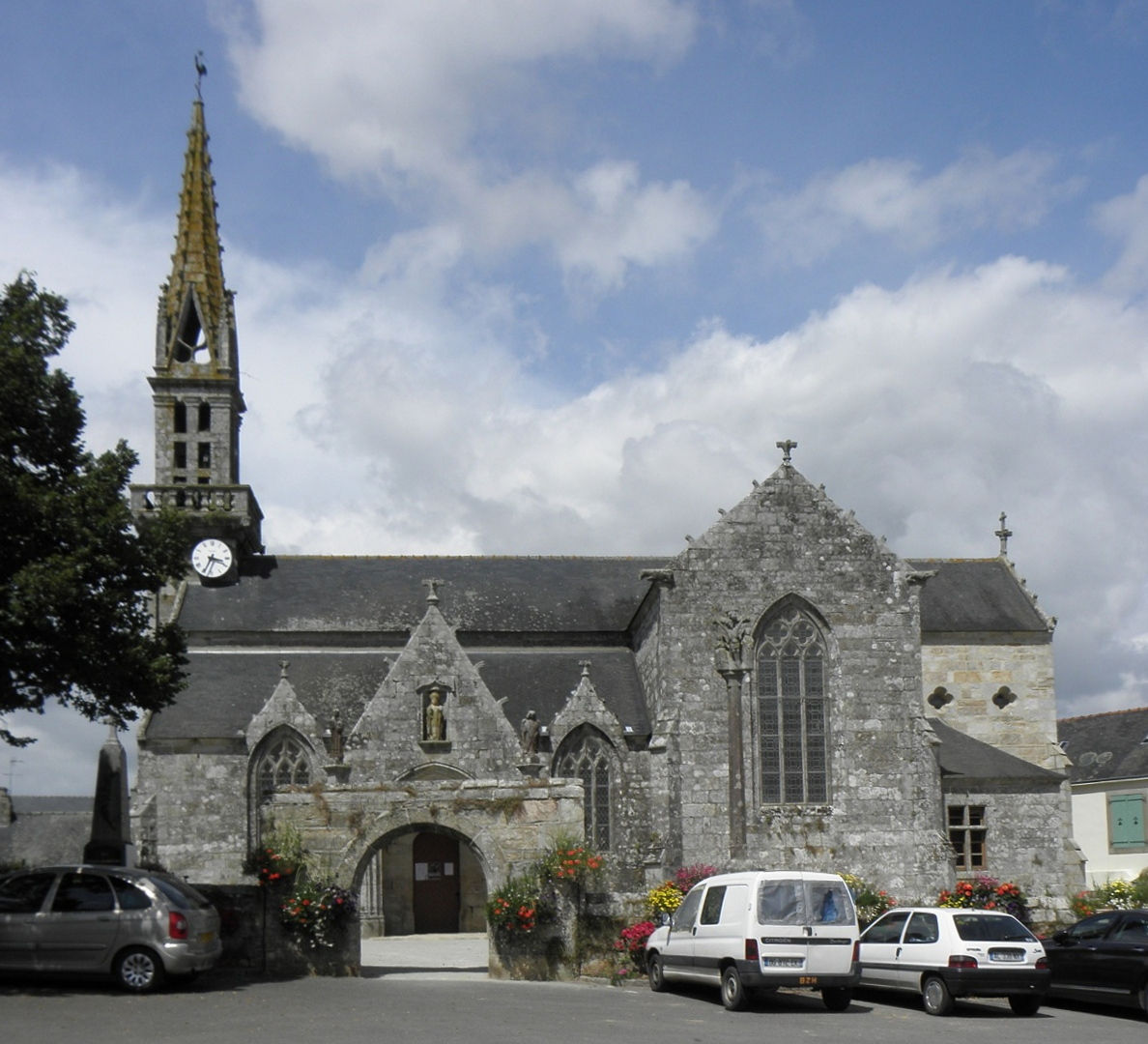
The parish church, the "Porte triomphale" and the calvary of the enclos paroissial,

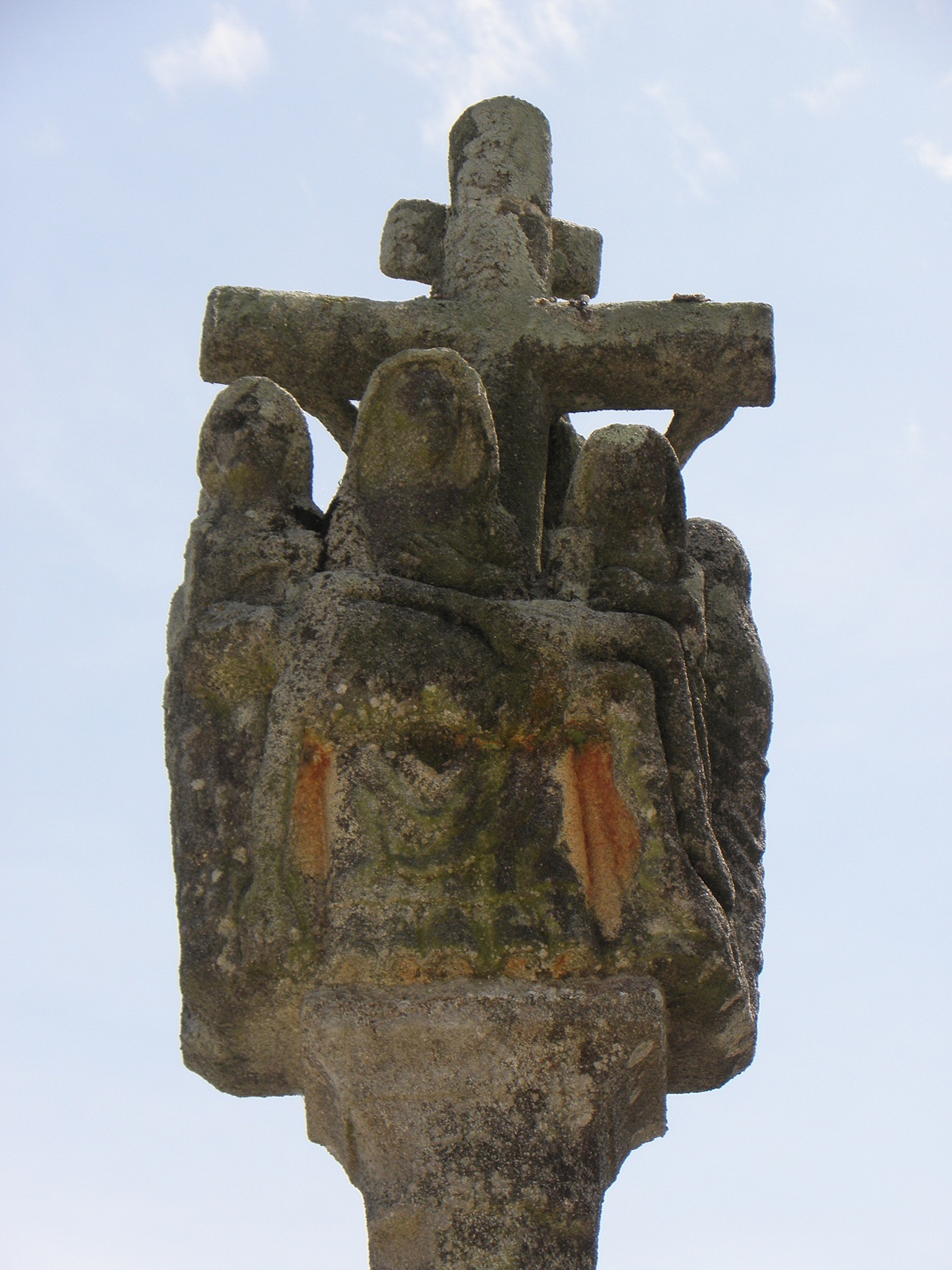
The pietà decorating the enclos paroissial calvary.

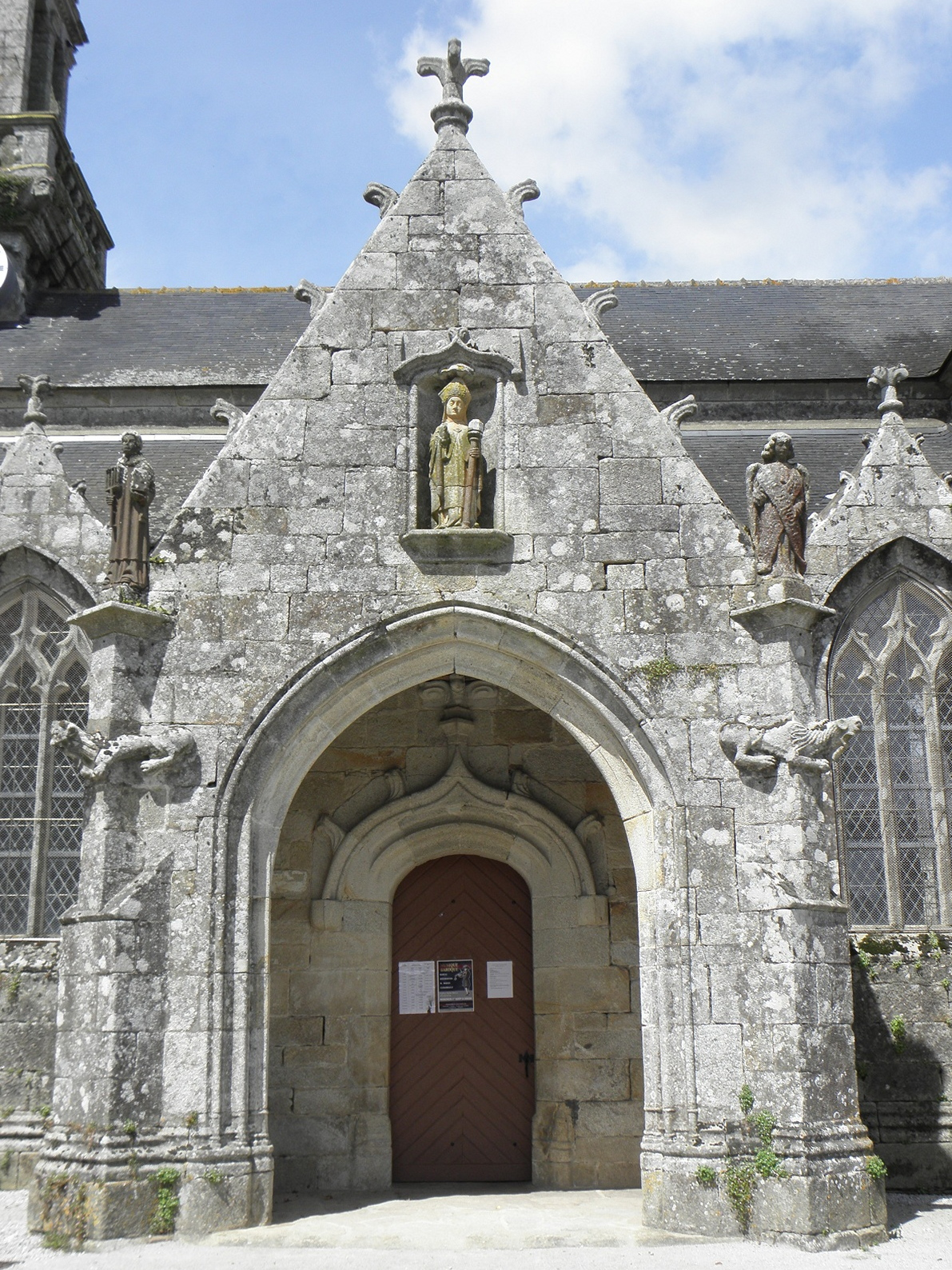
The south porch.
