= Quéménéven =

Quéménéven Kemeneven
- Commune
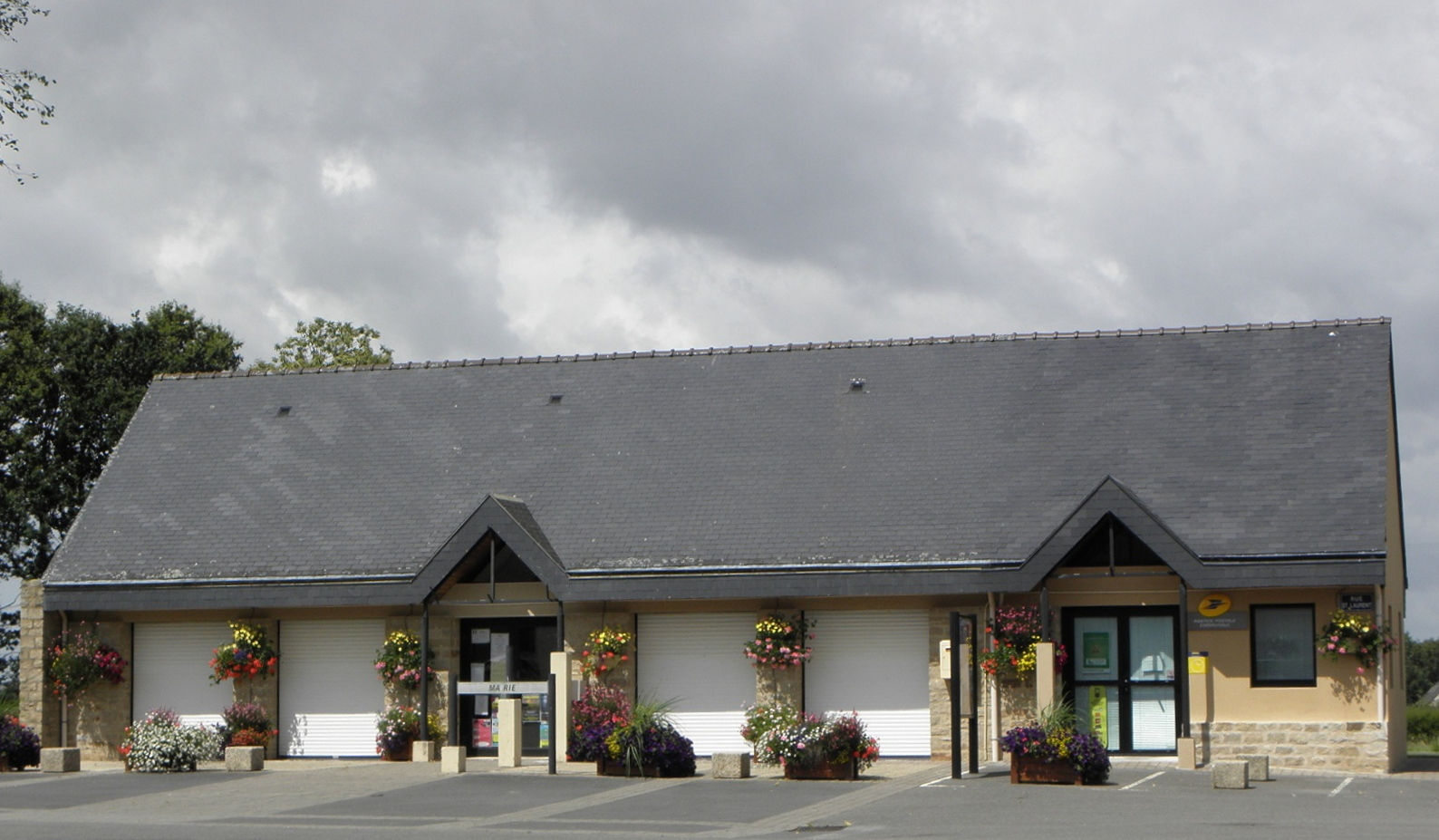
- The town hall in Quéménéven
- Location of Quéménéven
- Location within France Location within Brittany
- Coordinates: 48°06′53″N 4°07′14″W
- Country: France
- Region: Brittany
- Department: Finistère
- Arrondissement: Quimper
- Canton: Crozon
- Intercommunality: Quimper Bretagne Occidentale

Government
  - Mayor (2020–2026): Erwan Crouan
- Area^{1}: 28.21 km^{2} (10.89 sq mi)
- Highest elevation: 280 m (920 ft)
- Lowest elevation: 52 m (171 ft)
- Population (2023): 1,119
  - Density: 39.67/km^{2} (102.7/sq mi)
- Time zone: UTC+01:00 (CET)
  - Summer (DST): UTC+02:00 (CEST)
- INSEE/Postal code: 29229 /29180
- ^{1} French Land Register data, which excludes lakes, ponds, glaciers > 1 km^{2} (0.386 sq mi or 247 acres) and river estuaries.

Quéménéven (French pronunciation: [kemenevɛ̃]; Breton: Kemeneven) is a commune in the Finistère department of Brittany in northwestern France. Notable monuments include the Quéménéven Parish close in the village centre, and the Kergoat chapel in the hamlet Kergoat.

== Population ==
Inhabitants of Quéménéven are called in French Quéménévenois.

== See also ==
- Communes of the Finistère department
