= Quimper Bretagne Occidentale =

- Communauté d'agglomération
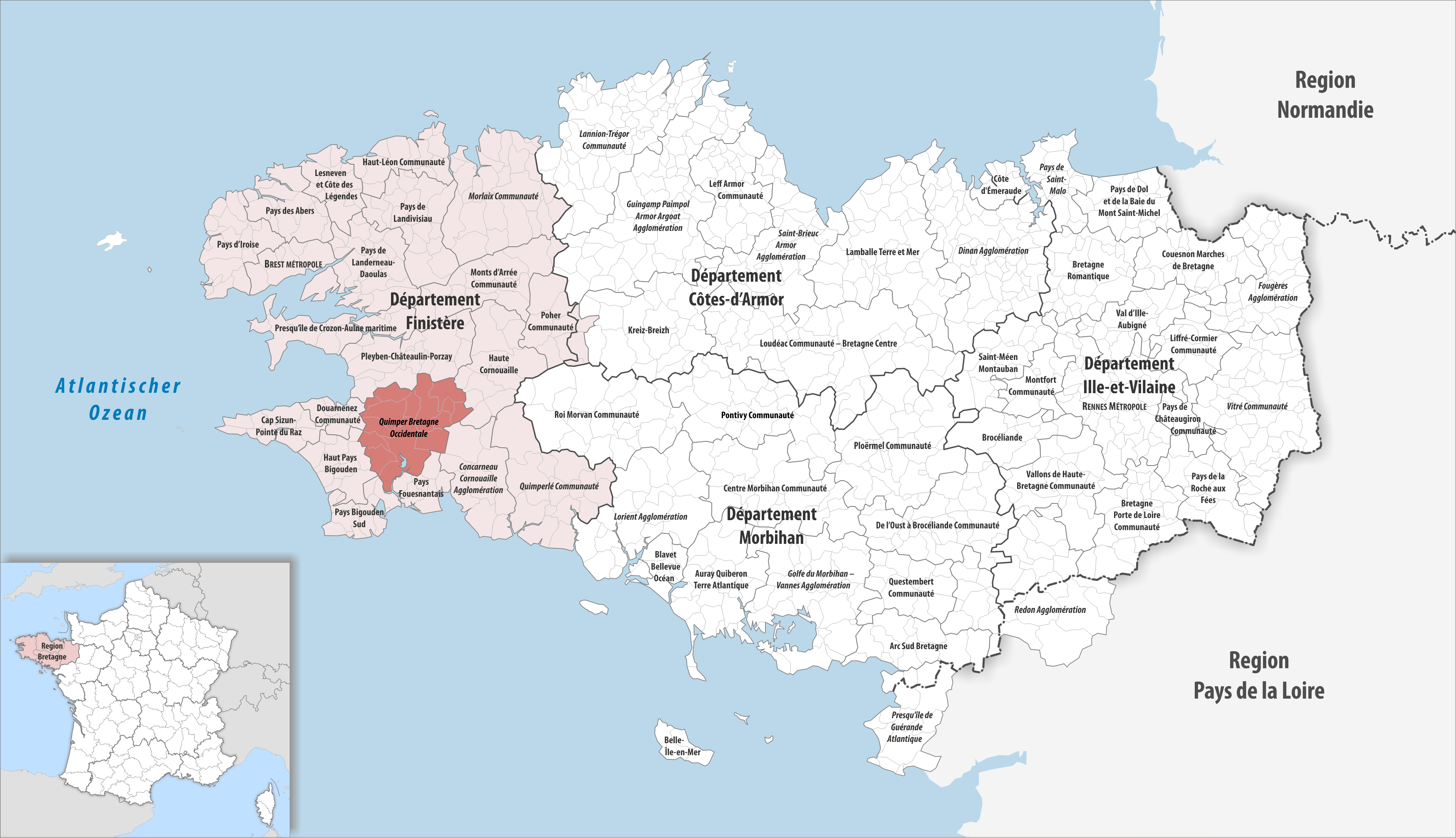
- Location within the region
- Coordinates: 48°00′N 04°06′W
- Country: France
- Region: Brittany
- Department: Finistère
- No. of communes: {{{nbcomm}}}
- Established: 2017
- Area: 479.4 km^{2} (185.1 sq mi)
- Population (2017): 100,196
  - Density: 209.0/km^{2} (541.3/sq mi)
- Website: www.quimper-bretagne-occidentale.bzh

Communauté d'agglomération Quimper Bretagne Occidentale (Breton: Kemper Breizh ar C'hornôg) is an intercommunal structure, centred on the city of Quimper. It is located in the Finistère department, in the Brittany region, western France. It was created in January 2017. Its seat is in Quimper. Its area is 479.4 km^{2}. Its population was 100,196 in 2017, of which 62,985 in Quimper proper.

== Composition ==
The communauté d'agglomération consists of the following 14 communes:

1. Briec
2. Edern
3. Ergué-Gabéric
4. Guengat
5. Landrévarzec
6. Landudal
7. Langolen
8. Locronan
9. Plogonnec
10. Plomelin
11. Plonéis
12. Pluguffan
13. Quéménéven
14. Quimper
