= Plonéis =

Plonéis Ploneiz
- Commune
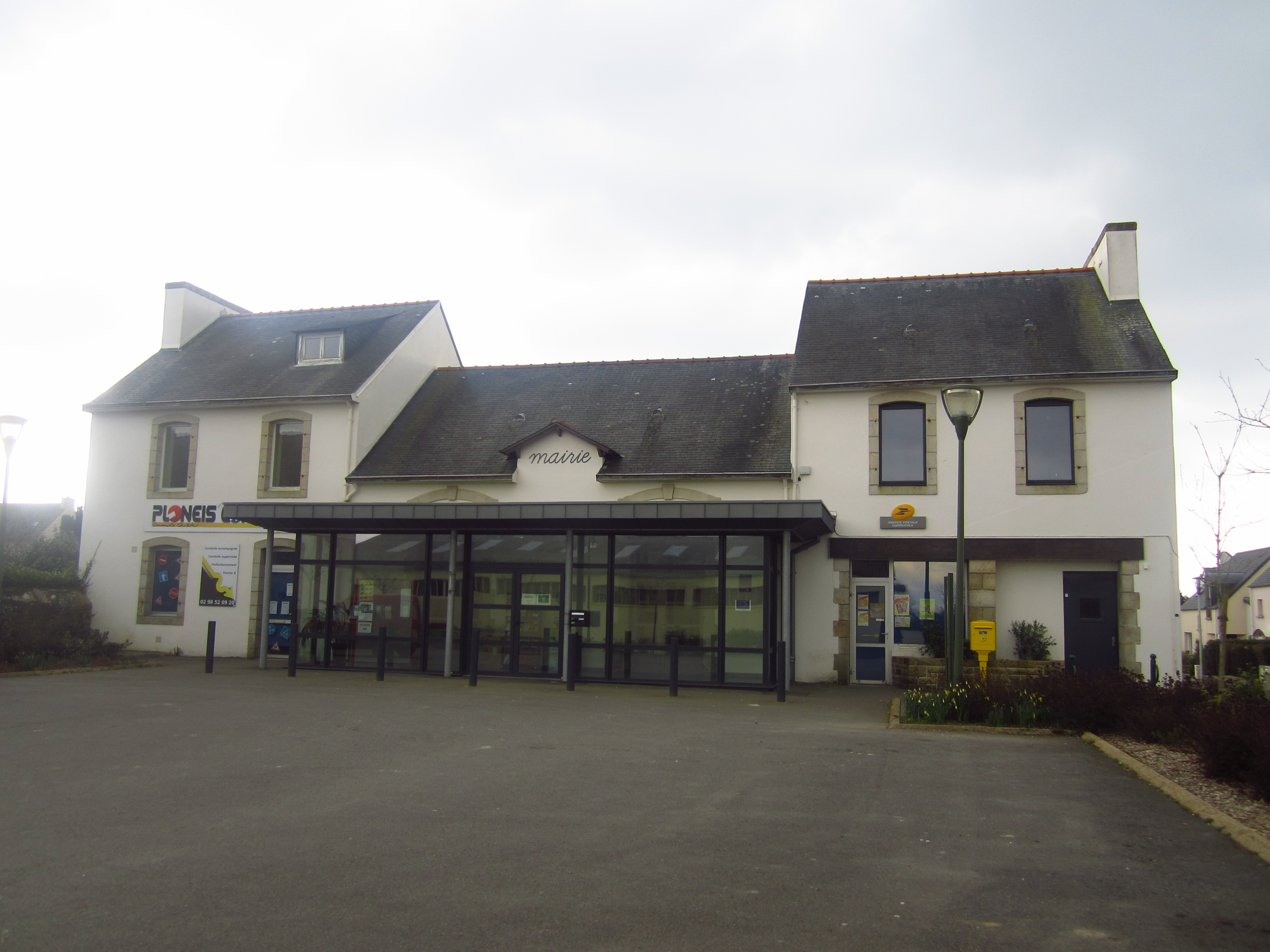
- The town hall in Plonéis

- Coat of arms
- Location of Plonéis
- Location within France Location within Brittany
- Coordinates: 48°01′03″N 4°12′33″W
- Country: France
- Region: Brittany
- Department: Finistère
- Arrondissement: Quimper
- Canton: Quimper-1
- Intercommunality: Quimper Bretagne Occidentale

Government
  - Mayor (2020–2026): Christian Corroller
- Area^{1}: 21.99 km^{2} (8.49 sq mi)
- Highest elevation: 168 m (551 ft)
- Lowest elevation: 27 m (89 ft)
- Population (2023): 2,409
  - Density: 109.5/km^{2} (283.7/sq mi)
- Time zone: UTC+01:00 (CET)
  - Summer (DST): UTC+02:00 (CEST)
- INSEE/Postal code: 29173 /29710
- ^{1} French Land Register data, which excludes lakes, ponds, glaciers > 1 km^{2} (0.386 sq mi or 247 acres) and river estuaries.

Plonéis (French pronunciation: [plɔnejs]; Breton: Ploneiz) is a commune in the Finistère department of Brittany in north-western France.

== Population ==
Inhabitants of Plonéis are called in French Plonéisiens.

Historical population
Year	Pop.	±% p.a.
1968	936	—
1975	1,161	+3.13%
1982	1,373	+2.42%
1990	1,426	+0.47%
1999	1,417	−0.07%
2007	1,756	+2.72%
2012	2,084	+3.48%
2017	2,425	+3.08%
2023	2,409	−0.11%
Source: INSEE

== See also ==
- Communes of the Finistère department
