= Kergoat chapel =

Chapel in Quéménéven, Finistère, France

Coordinates: 48.1144°N 4.1693°W

The Chapelle Notre-Dame de Kergoat is a 16th century chapel in the hamlet Kergoat, in the commune Quéménéven, Finistère, northwestern France. It has various stained glass windows and contains statues of Sainte Marguerite, Sainte Barbe, Saint Joseph, Saint Francis, Saint Mathurin, John the Baptist with the Virgin Mary. Some other statues have been moved to the musée de Quimper. i.e.Saint Sébastien, Saint Roch, Sainte Marie Madeleine, Sainte Barbe, the Virgin Mary and an "Ecce Homo". The Calvary of the Kergoat chapel is 6.50 metres in height. It includes a table to accommodate offerings. Statues include those of John the Baptist, Saint Guénolé, and John the Evangelist, and a Vierge de Pitié. The chapel and the calvary are a listed historical monument since 1935.

== The pardon de Kergoat ==
The Kergoat pardon was immortalised by the painter Jules Breton in 1891 with the painting Le Pardon de Kergoat. This painting is held in the Quimper Musée des beaux-arts.

== Gallery ==
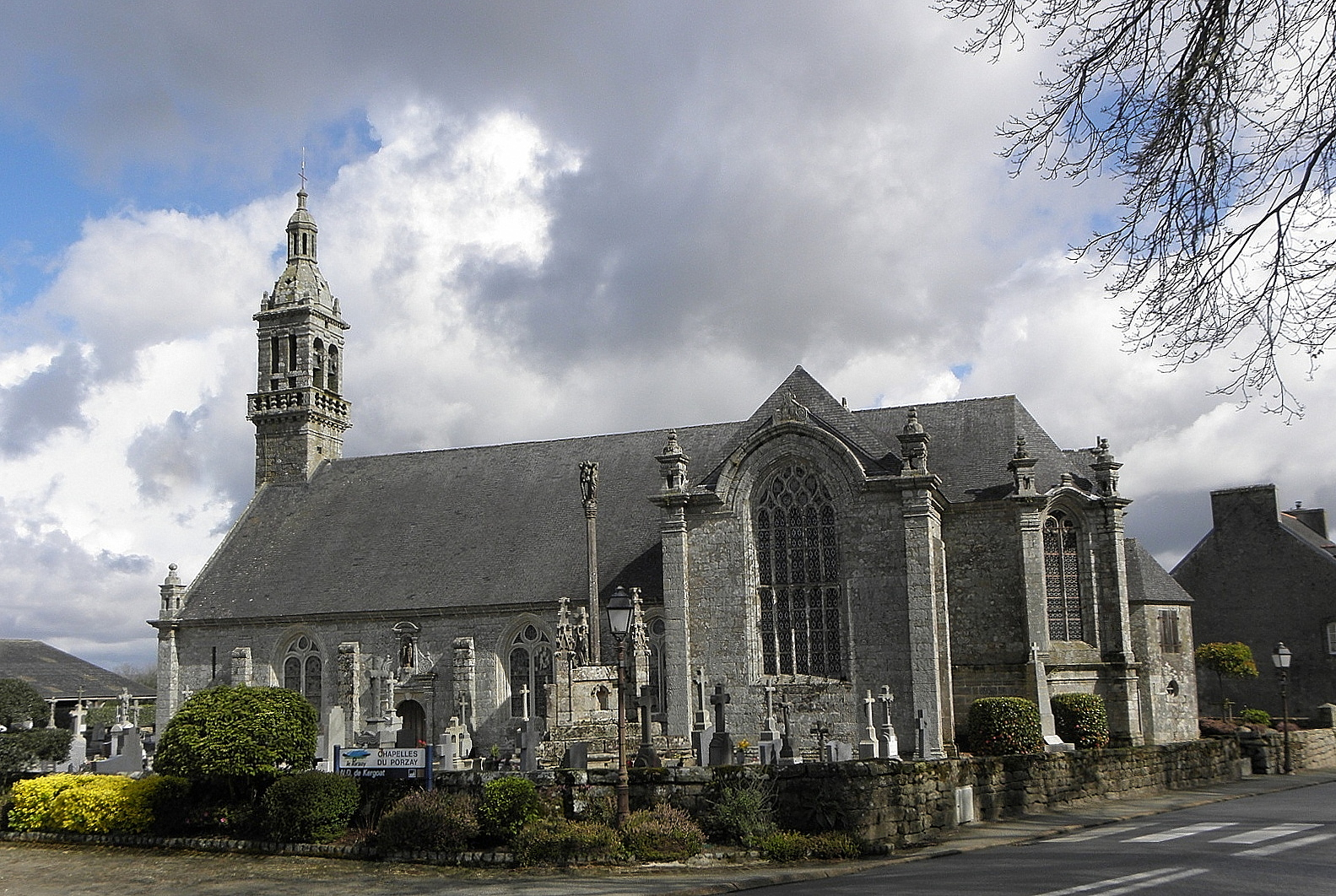
The chapelle Notre-Dame-de-Kergoat

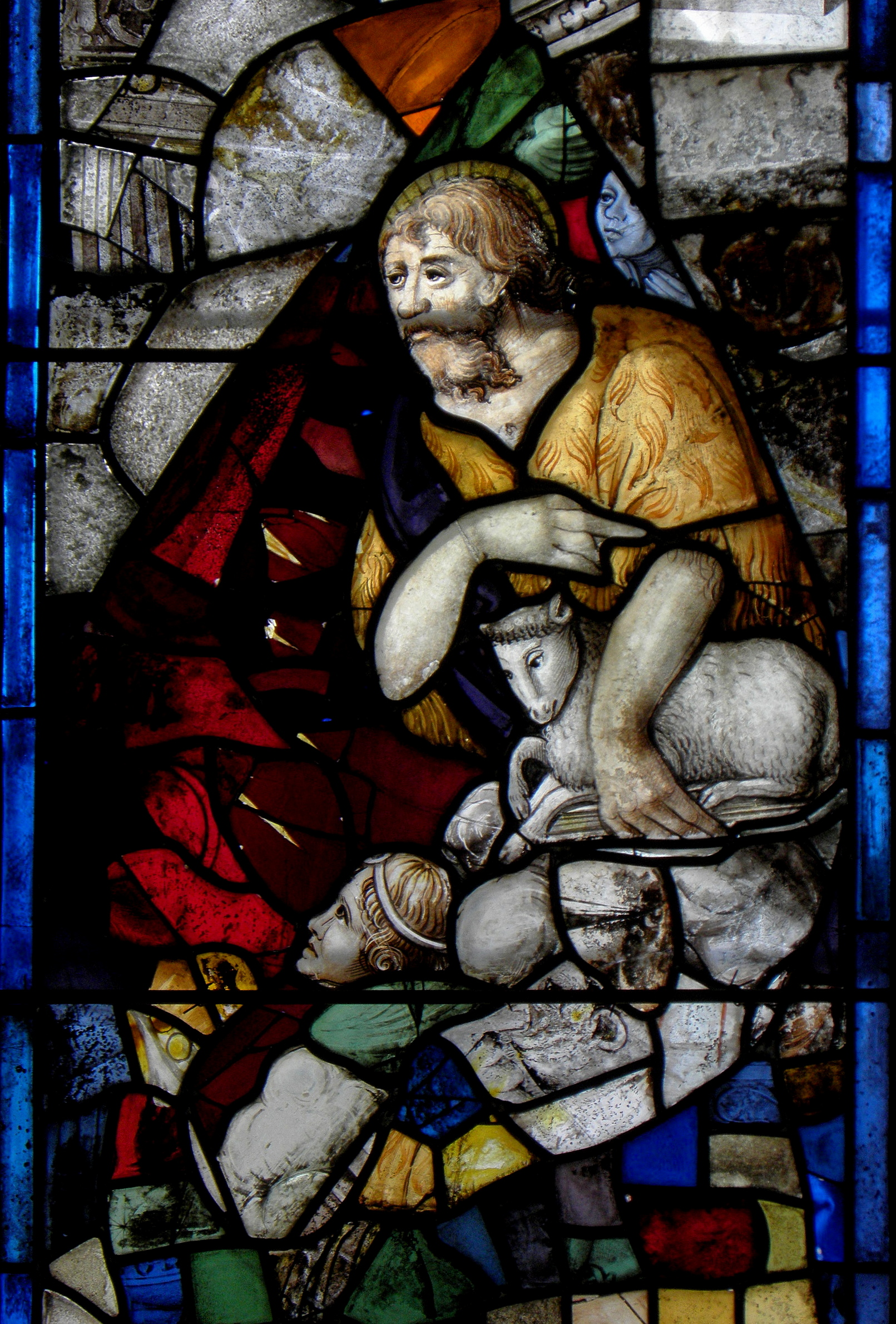
Part of stained glass in the Chapelle Notre-Dame de Kergoat.A depiction of John the Baptist

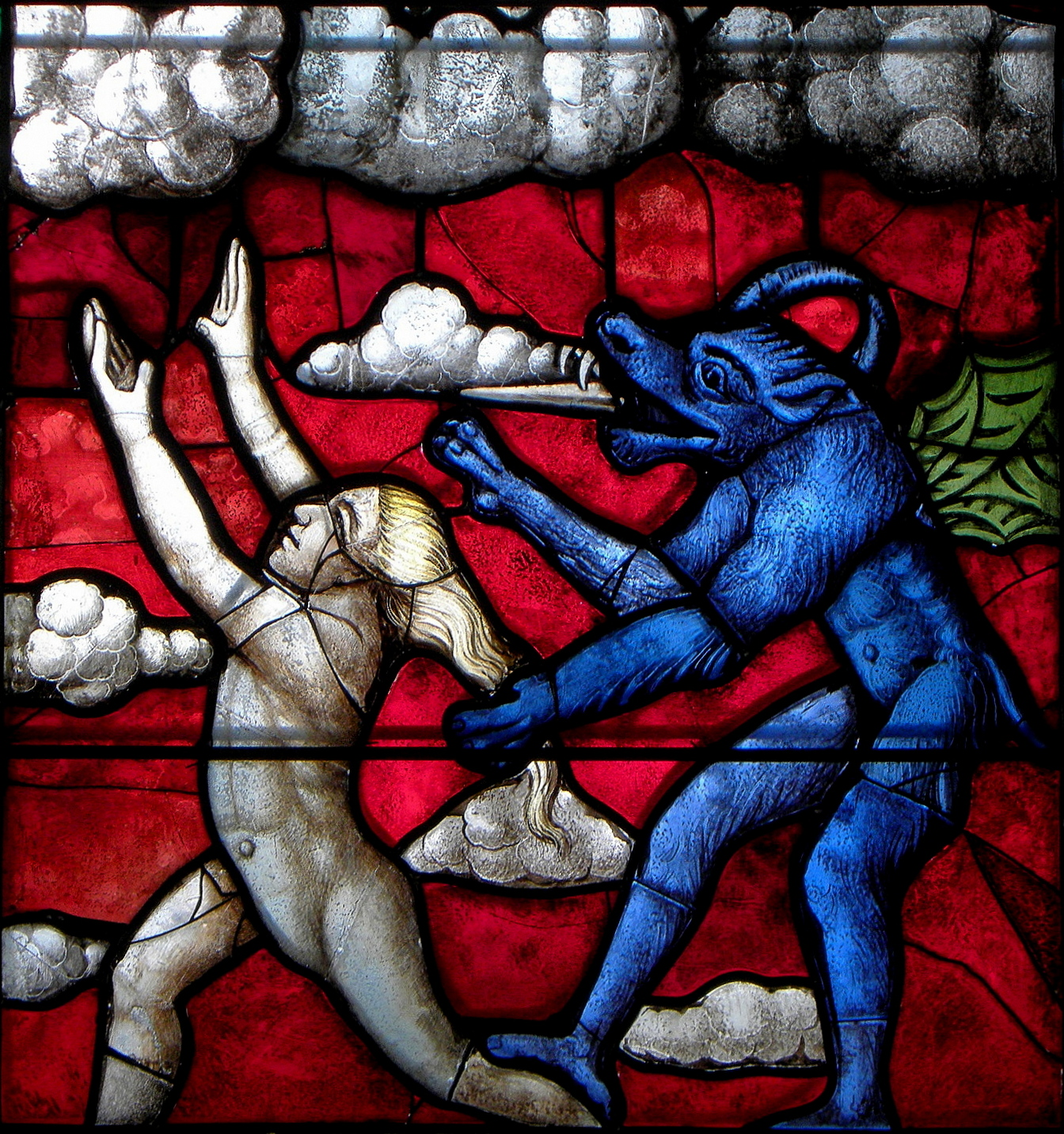
Part of stained glass in the Chapelle Notre-Dame de Kergoat. An angel is chased by a demon.

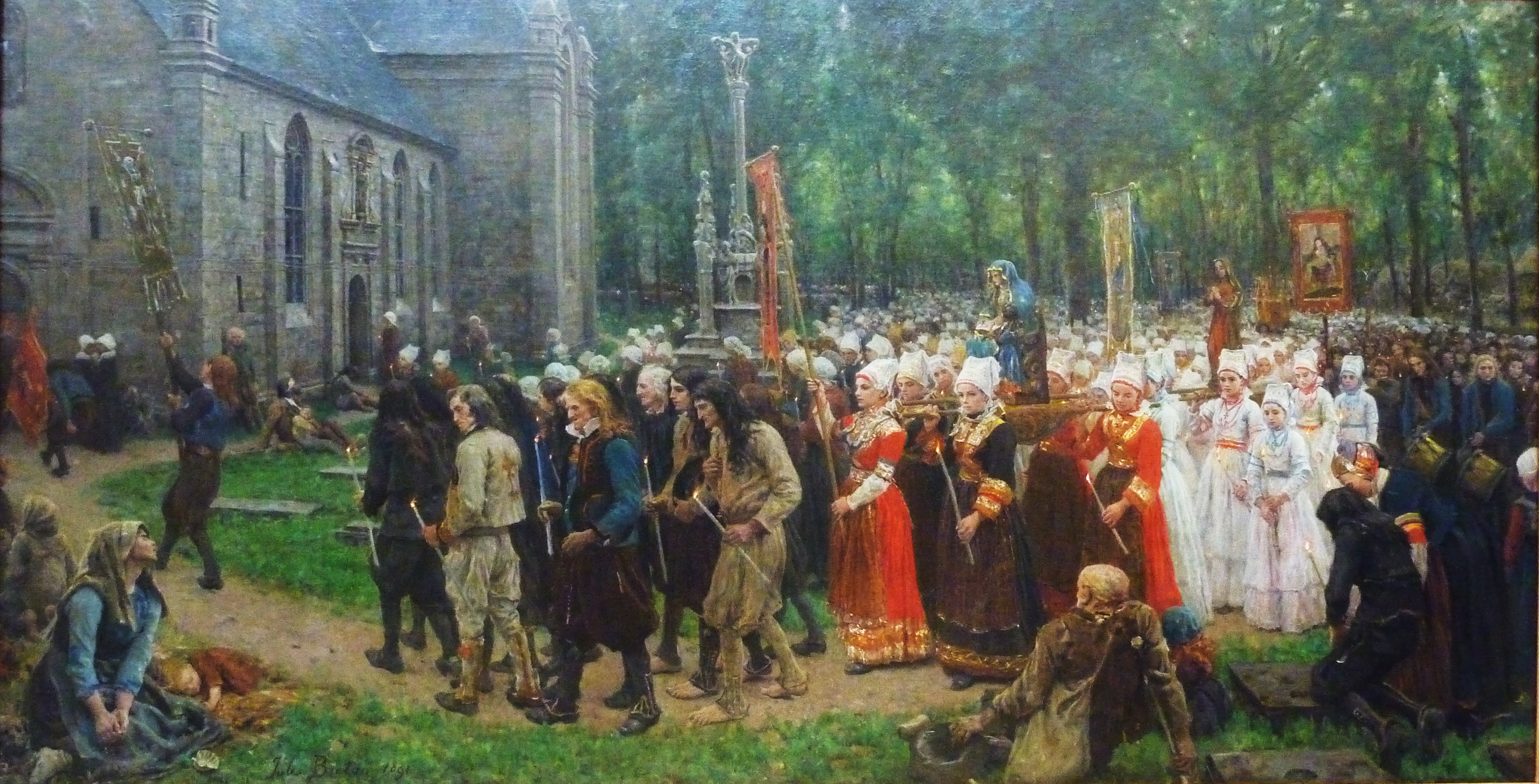
Jules Breton's Le Pardon de Kergoat. Held by the Quimper Musée des beaux-arts
