= Guengat =

Guengat Gwengad
- Commune
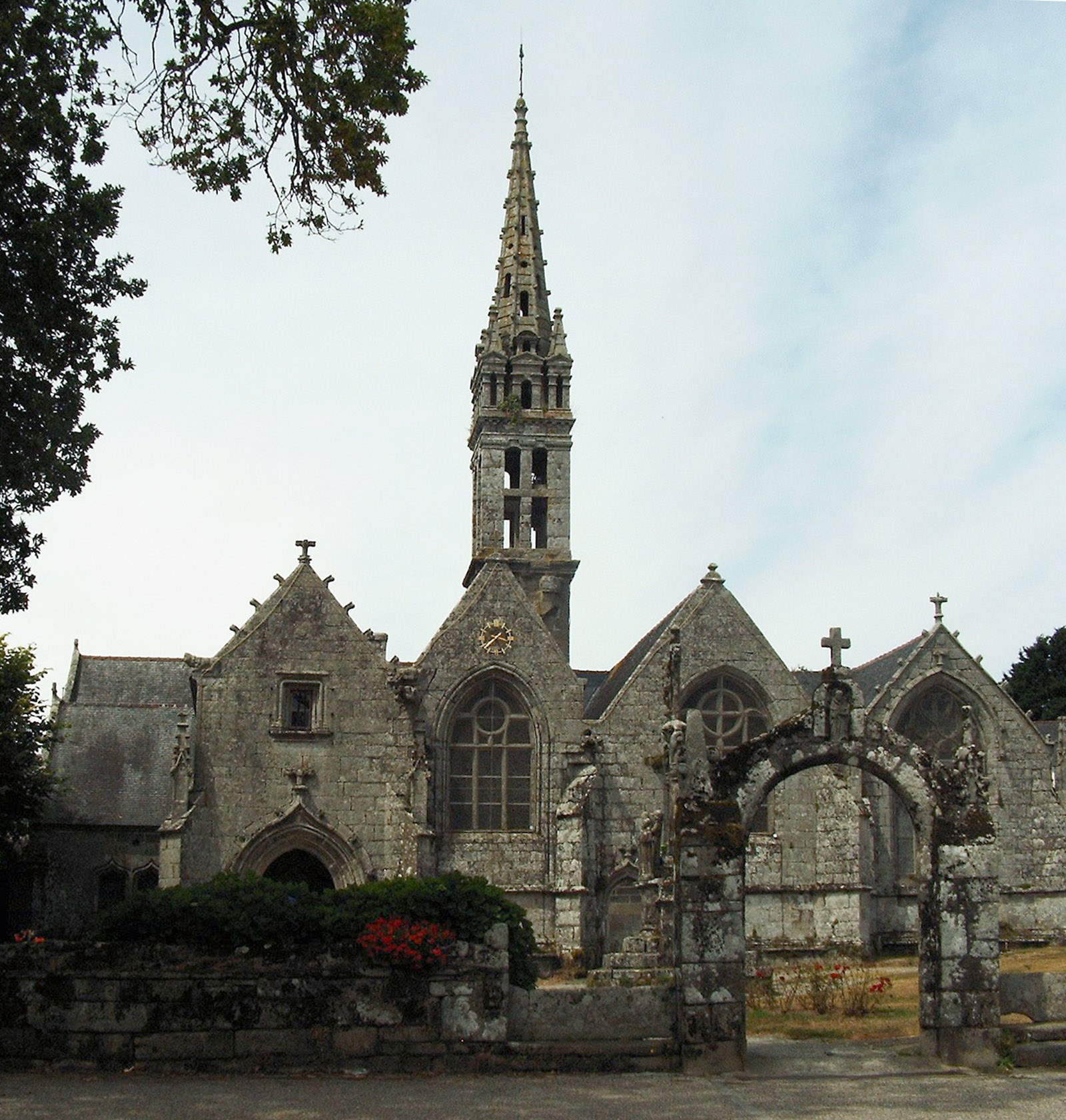
- The church in Guengat

- Coat of arms
- Location of Guengat
- Location within France Location within Brittany
- Coordinates: 48°02′33″N 4°12′15″W
- Country: France
- Region: Brittany
- Department: Finistère
- Arrondissement: Quimper
- Canton: Quimper-1
- Intercommunality: Quimper Bretagne Occidentale

Government
  - Mayor (2020–2026): David Le Goff
- Area^{1}: 22.72 km^{2} (8.77 sq mi)
- Highest elevation: 162 m (531 ft)
- Lowest elevation: 7 m (23 ft)
- Population (2023): 1,846
  - Density: 81.25/km^{2} (210.4/sq mi)
- Time zone: UTC+01:00 (CET)
  - Summer (DST): UTC+02:00 (CEST)
- INSEE/Postal code: 29066 /29180
- ^{1} French Land Register data, which excludes lakes, ponds, glaciers > 1 km^{2} (0.386 sq mi or 247 acres) and river estuaries.

Guengat (Breton: Gwengad) is a commune in the Finistère department of Brittany in northwestern France.

== Population ==
Inhabitants of Guengat are called in French Guengatais.

== See also ==
- Communes of the Finistère department
