= Canton of Quimper-1 =

Coordinates: 47.99°N 4.12°W

The canton of Quimper-1 is an administrative division of the Finistère department, northwestern France. Its borders were modified at the French canton reorganisation which came into effect in March 2015. Its seat is in Quimper.

It consists of the following communes:

1. Guengat
2. Locronan
3. Plogonnec
4. Plomelin
5. Plonéis
6. Pluguffan
7. Quimper (partly)
