= Landrévarzec =

Landrévarzec Landrevarzeg
- Commune
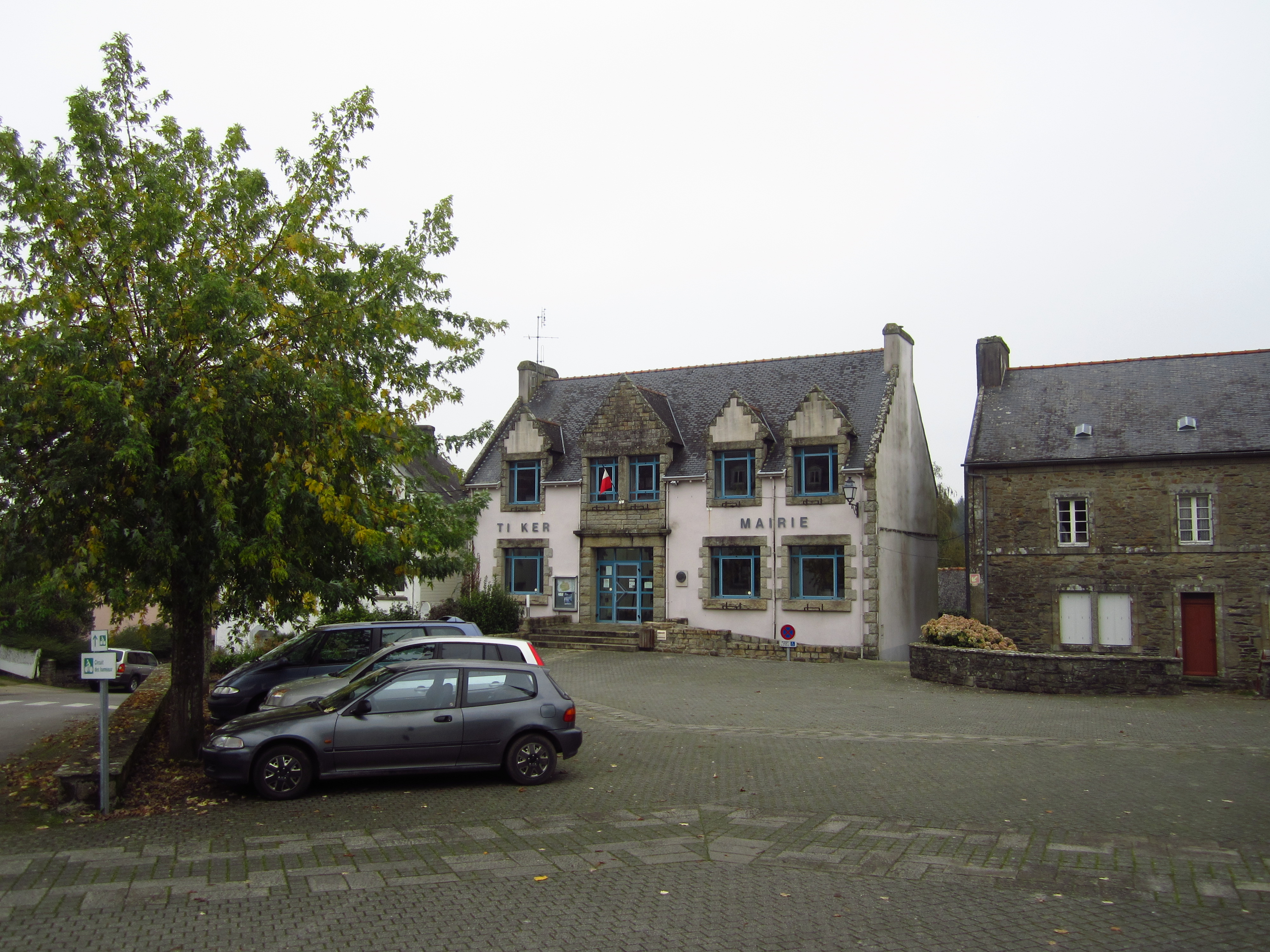
- The town hall in Landrévarzec

- Coat of arms
- Location of Landrévarzec
- Location within France Location within Brittany
- Coordinates: 48°05′25″N 4°03′33″W
- Country: France
- Region: Brittany
- Department: Finistère
- Arrondissement: Quimper
- Canton: Briec
- Intercommunality: Quimper Bretagne Occidentale

Government
  - Mayor (2020–2026): Paul Boedec
- Area^{1}: 20.32 km^{2} (7.85 sq mi)
- Highest elevation: 165 m (541 ft)
- Lowest elevation: 42 m (138 ft)
- Population (2023): 1,882
  - Density: 92.62/km^{2} (239.9/sq mi)
- Time zone: UTC+01:00 (CET)
  - Summer (DST): UTC+02:00 (CEST)
- INSEE/Postal code: 29106 /29510
- ^{1} French Land Register data, which excludes lakes, ponds, glaciers > 1 km^{2} (0.386 sq mi or 247 acres) and river estuaries.

Landrévarzec (French pronunciation: [lɑ̃dʁevaʁzɛk]; Breton: Landrevarzeg) is a commune in the Finistère department of Brittany in north-western France.

== Population ==
Inhabitants of Landrévarzec are called in French Landrévarzécois.

Historical population
Year	Pop.	±% p.a.
1968	1,025	—
1975	1,090	+0.88%
1982	1,240	+1.86%
1990	1,372	+1.27%
1999	1,452	+0.63%
2007	1,577	+1.04%
2012	1,750	+2.10%
2017	1,841	+1.02%
2023	1,882	+0.37%
Source: INSEE

== Breton language ==
The municipality launched a linguistic plan through Ya d'ar brezhoneg on 7 November 2008.

== See also ==
- Communes of the Finistère department
