= Pluguffan =

Pluguffan Pluguen
- Commune
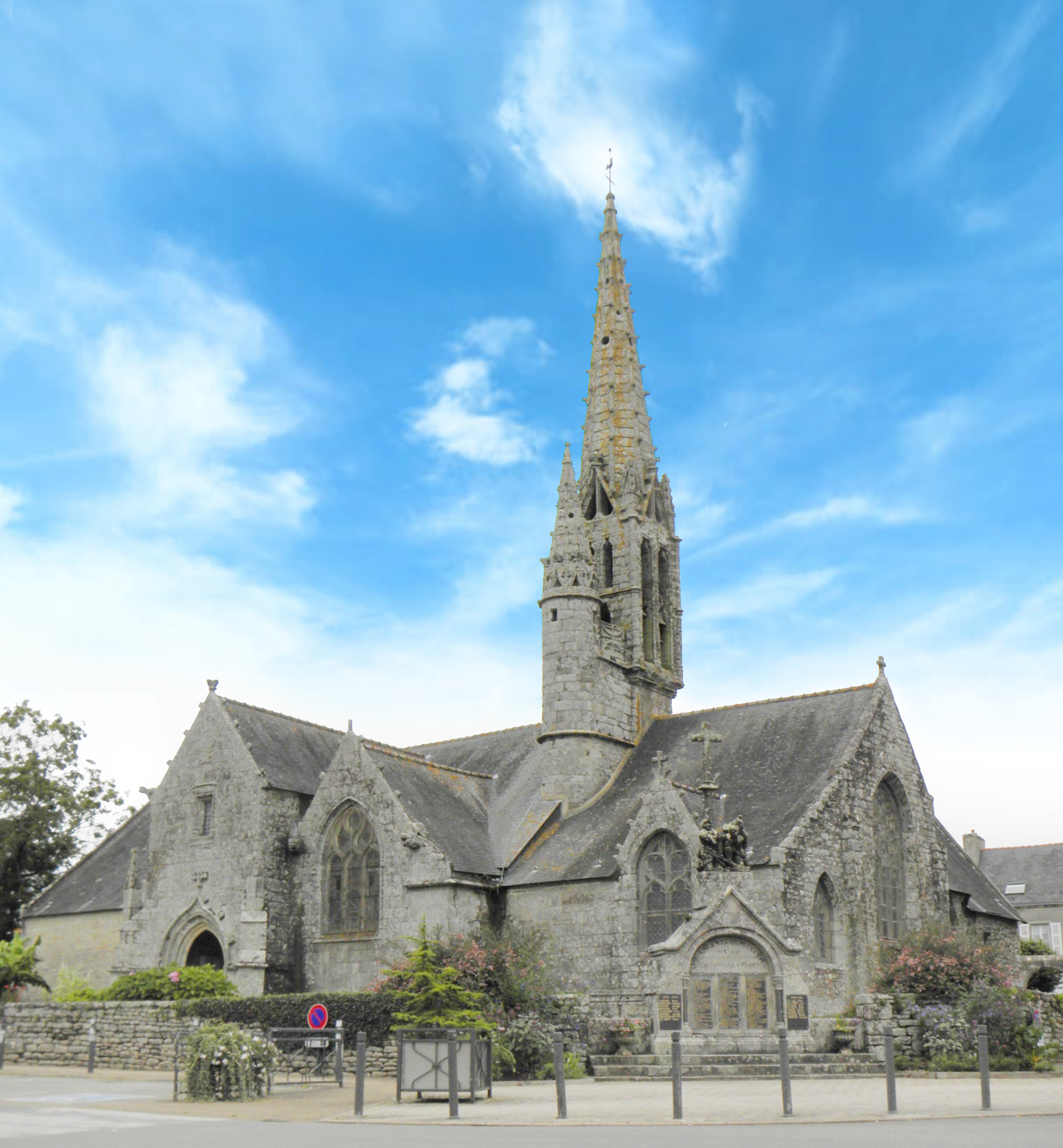
- The church of Saint-Cuffan, in Pluguffan

- Coat of arms
- Location of Pluguffan
- Location within France Location within Brittany
- Coordinates: 47°58′54″N 4°10′39″W
- Country: France
- Region: Brittany
- Department: Finistère
- Arrondissement: Quimper
- Canton: Quimper-1
- Intercommunality: Quimper Bretagne Occidentale

Government
  - Mayor (2020–2026): Alain Decourchelle
- Area^{1}: 32.09 km^{2} (12.39 sq mi)
- Highest elevation: 155 m (509 ft)
- Lowest elevation: 10 m (33 ft)
- Population (2023): 4,223
  - Density: 131.6/km^{2} (340.8/sq mi)
- Time zone: UTC+01:00 (CET)
  - Summer (DST): UTC+02:00 (CEST)
- INSEE/Postal code: 29216 /29700
- ^{1} French Land Register data, which excludes lakes, ponds, glaciers > 1 km^{2} (0.386 sq mi or 247 acres) and river estuaries.

Pluguffan (French pronunciation: [plyɡyfɑ̃]; Breton: Pluguen) is a commune in the Finistère department of Brittany in north-western France.

== Population ==
Inhabitants of Pluguffan are called in French Pluguffanais.

Historical population
Year	Pop.	±% p.a.
1968	1,639	—
1975	2,203	+4.32%
1982	3,107	+5.03%
1990	3,238	+0.52%
1999	3,155	−0.29%
2007	3,345	+0.73%
2012	3,735	+2.23%
2017	4,109	+1.93%
2023	4,223	+0.46%
Source: INSEE

== See also ==
- Quimper - Cornouaille Airport
- Communes of the Finistère department
- Krampouz
