= Plogonnec =

Plogonnec Plogoneg
- Commune
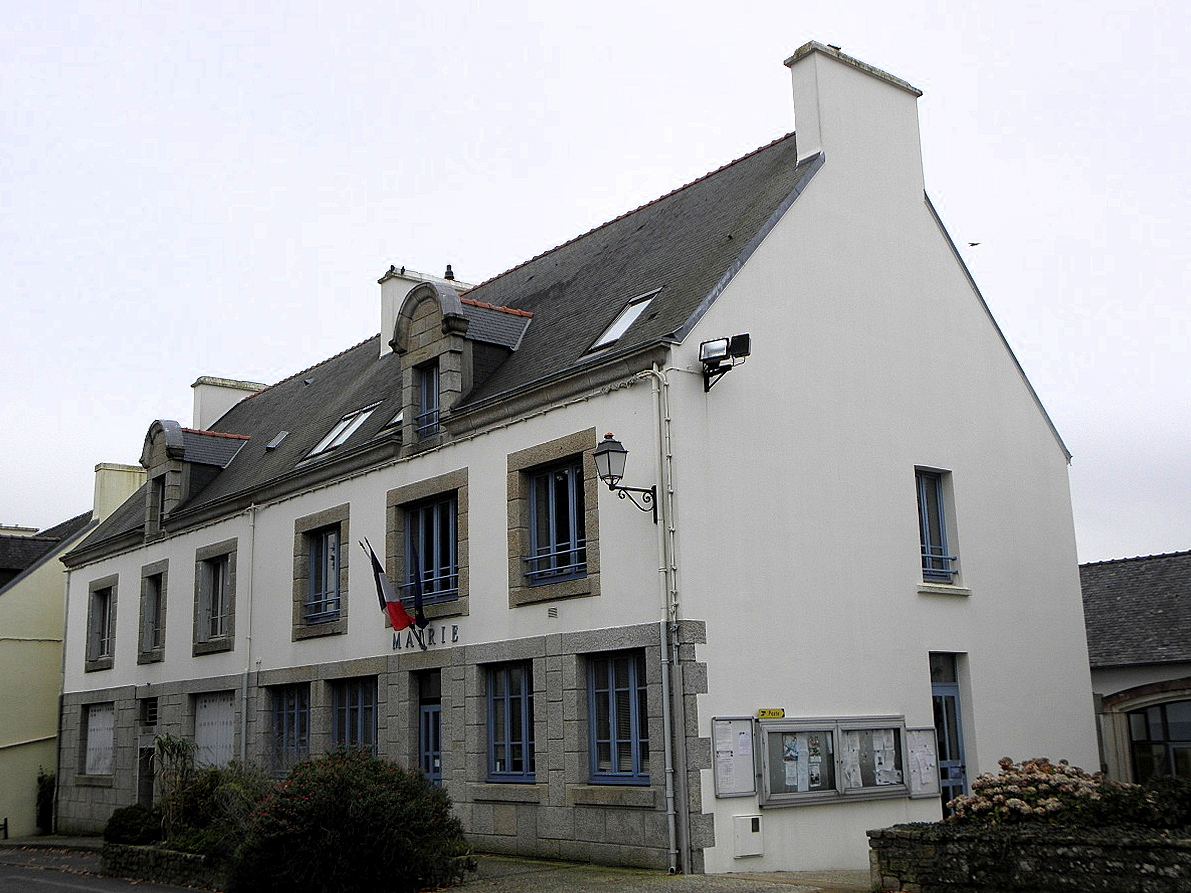
- Town hall or Mairie

- Coat of arms
- Location of Plogonnec
- Location within France Location within Brittany
- Coordinates: 48°04′43″N 4°11′35″W
- Country: France
- Region: Brittany
- Department: Finistère
- Arrondissement: Quimper
- Canton: Quimper-1
- Intercommunality: Quimper Bretagne Occidentale

Government
  - Mayor (2020–2026): Didier Leroy
- Area^{1}: 54.14 km^{2} (20.90 sq mi)
- Highest elevation: 286 m (938 ft)
- Lowest elevation: 12 m (39 ft)
- Population (2023): 3,236
  - Density: 59.77/km^{2} (154.8/sq mi)
- Time zone: UTC+01:00 (CET)
  - Summer (DST): UTC+02:00 (CEST)
- INSEE/Postal code: 29169 /29180
- ^{1} French Land Register data, which excludes lakes, ponds, glaciers > 1 km^{2} (0.386 sq mi or 247 acres) and river estuaries.

Plogonnec (French pronunciation: [plɔɡɔnɛk]; Breton: Plogoneg) is a commune and small town in the Finistère department of Brittany in north-western France. It is about 13 km (8 mi) north west of Quimper and 10 km (6 mi) east of Douarnenez. The town is twinned with Llandysul in Wales.

== Geography ==
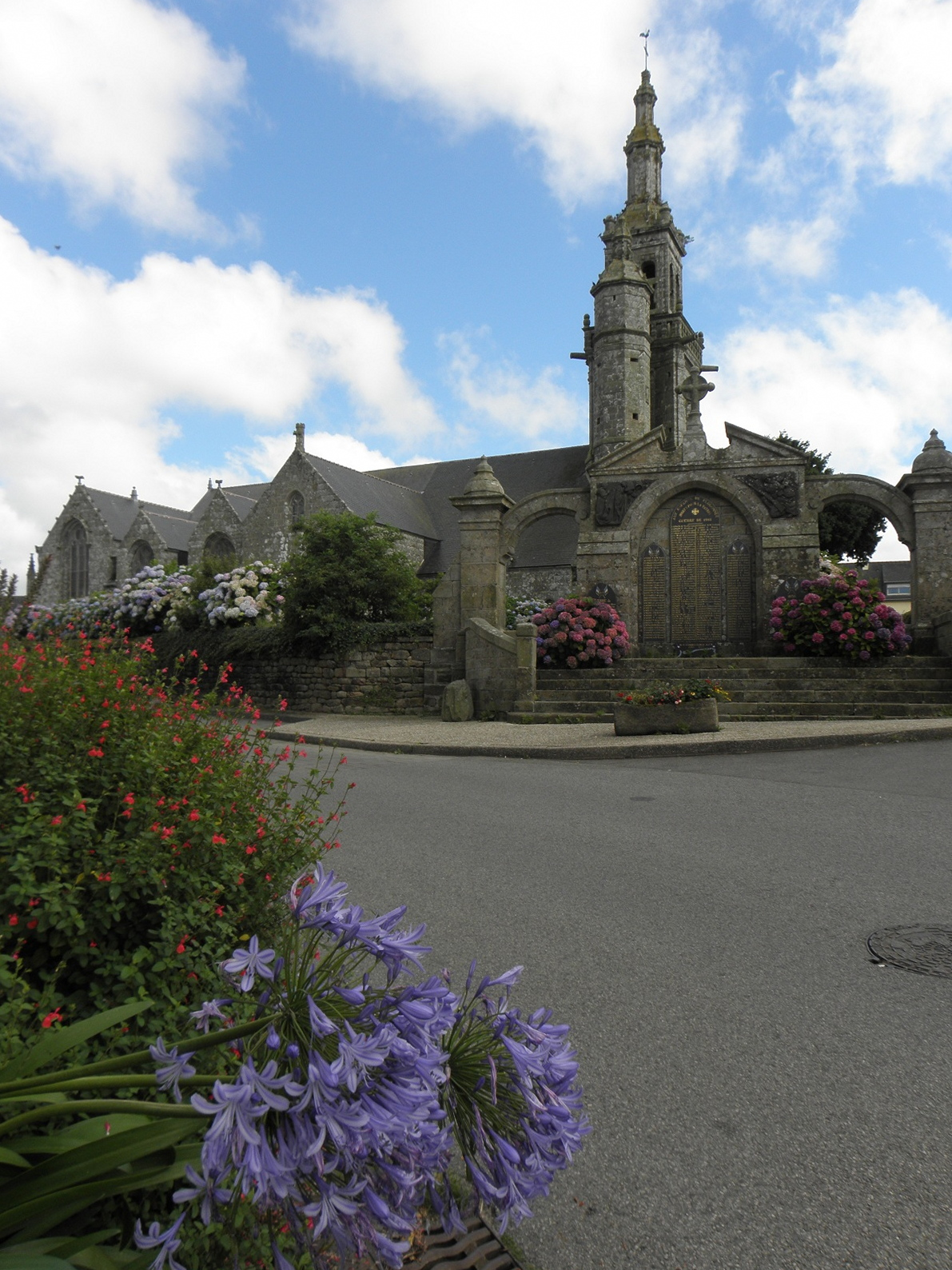
Church of Saint-Thurien

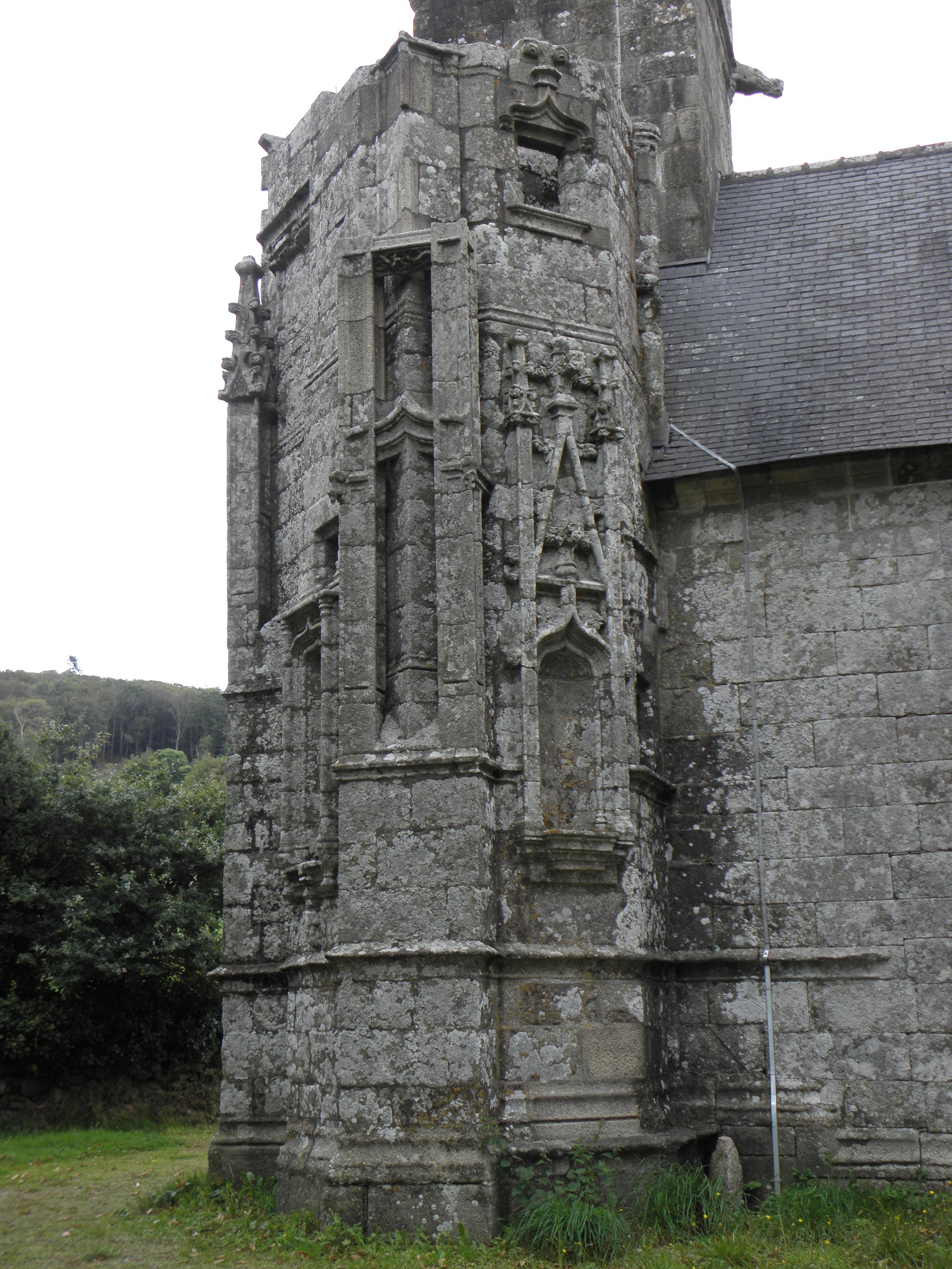
Sculptured bell tower of Chapel of Saint-Théleau

The town is situated in a hilly area about 10 km (6 mi) inland from the fishing port of Douarnenez. Quimper is about 15 km (9 mi) to the south east and the N165 Brest to Nantes trunk road lies between Plogonnec and Quimper. The lowest part of the commune is the River Névet, the town is at an altitude of 130 m (427 ft) and the commune rises in the north to an altitude of 286 m (938 ft) on the slopes of the Montagne de Locronan. Panoramic views to the coast are available from the Montagne du Prieuré. The total area of the commune is around 3,200 ha (7,900 acres). Much of the land is agricultural but there are several protected areas of woodland. To the west is the extensive Bois du Nevet which offers opportunities for hiking.

== History ==
The Seigneures of Névet headed a clan and were one of the oldest and most influential families in the Cornouaille. Their lands included both the west and east parts of the commune but the central part was under the control of the Princes of the House of Rohan under the direct authority of the Bishops of Cornouaille. At the end of the sixteenth century, the French Wars of Religion devastated the parish which was also affected by the Revolt of the Bonnets Rouges in 1675.

== Notable buildings ==
Besides the Church of Saint-Thurien de Plogonnec there are a number of chapels dating from the 16th and 17th centuries. Particularly notable is the Chapel of Saint Théleau the evangelist which is known for its intricate sculptures and is classed as an ancient monument. There are also secular historic buildings in the town including mansions, wash houses, mills and farmhouses. Facilities include primary schools, kindergartens, shops, bars and restaurants.

== Twinning ==
Plogonnec is twinned with Llandysul in West Wales, a small town in a similar rural area. The purpose of the twinning is to promote cultural and commercial ties between the two. Members of the communities have exchanged hospitality and have united for various events in both Brittany and Wales.

== Population ==
The population of Plogonnec has varied over the last two centuries between around 2000 inhabitants to its present level of just over 3000, with the highest level of 3365 in 1911. Inhabitants of Plogonnec are called in French Plogonnecois(es) or Plogonistes.

Historical population

Year	Pop.	±% p.a.
1793	2,175	—
1800	2,200	+0.16%
1806	2,036	−1.28%
1821	2,305	+0.83%
1831	2,570	+1.09%
1836	2,666	+0.74%
1841	2,687	+0.16%
1846	2,761	+0.54%
1851	2,832	+0.51%
1856	2,905	+0.51%
1861	2,848	−0.40%
1866	2,944	+0.67%
1872	2,844	−0.57%
1876	2,874	+0.26%
1881	2,919	+0.31%
1886	3,003	+0.57%
1891	3,135	+0.86%
1896	3,173	+0.24%
1901	3,272	+0.62%

Year	Pop.	±% p.a.
1906	3,361	+0.54%
1911	3,365	+0.02%
1921	3,096	−0.83%
1926	3,021	−0.49%
1931	2,903	−0.79%
1936	2,670	−1.66%
1946	2,720	+0.19%
1954	2,407	−1.52%
1962	2,299	−0.57%
1968	2,270	−0.21%
1975	2,708	+2.55%
1982	2,888	+0.92%
1990	3,073	+0.78%
1999	2,806	−1.00%
2007	3,034	+0.98%
2012	3,070	+0.24%
2017	3,156	+0.55%
2023	3,236	+0.42%

Source: EHESS and INSEE (1968–2023)

== See also ==
- Communes of the Finistère department
- Roland Doré sculptor
