= Plomelin =

Plomelin Ploveilh
- Commune
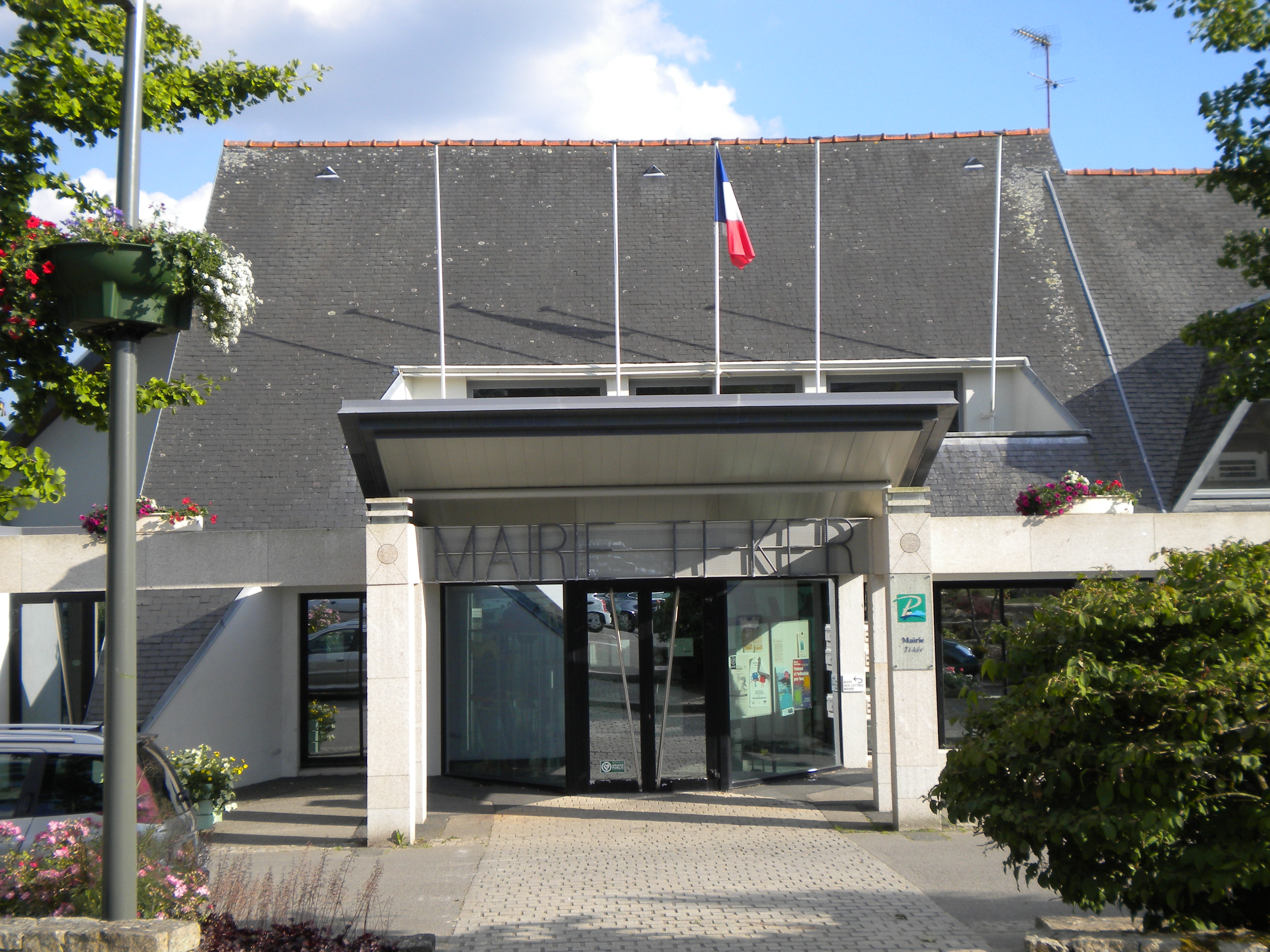
- Town hall

- Flag Coat of arms
- Location of Plomelin
- Location within France Location within Brittany
- Coordinates: 47°56′11″N 4°09′06″W
- Country: France
- Region: Brittany
- Department: Finistère
- Arrondissement: Quimper
- Canton: Quimper-1
- Intercommunality: Quimper Bretagne Occidentale

Government
  - Mayor (2020–2026): Dominique Le Roux
- Area^{1}: 26.08 km^{2} (10.07 sq mi)
- Highest elevation: 88 m (289 ft)
- Lowest elevation: 0 m (0 ft)
- Population (2023): 4,239
  - Density: 162.5/km^{2} (421.0/sq mi)
- Time zone: UTC+01:00 (CET)
  - Summer (DST): UTC+02:00 (CEST)
- INSEE/Postal code: 29170 /29700
- ^{1} French Land Register data, which excludes lakes, ponds, glaciers > 1 km^{2} (0.386 sq mi or 247 acres) and river estuaries.

Plomelin (French pronunciation: [plɔmlɛ̃]; Ploveilh in Breton) is a commune in the Finistère department of Brittany in north-western France.

It lies near the Odet river, about 7 km (4.3 mi) southwest of Quimper.

== International relations ==
Plomelin is twinned with the village of Crymych in Wales and the village of Betziesdorf in Germany. Breton town of more than 4,000 inhabitants, Plomelin (Ploveilh in Breton) is ideally located on the right bank of the Odet, halfway between Quimper, capital of Cornouaille and the beaches of Bénodet, Sainte-Marine and L 'Île-Tudy.

It offers more than 40 km of hiking trails through the countryside and along the banks of the Odet.

Traces of the past, some going back thousands of years, bear witness to the richness of its history. Source(Google)

== Population ==
Inhabitants of Plomelin are called in French Plomelinois.

Historical population
Year	Pop.	±% p.a.
1968	1,321	—
1975	2,052	+6.49%
1982	3,041	+5.78%
1990	3,870	+3.06%
1999	3,938	+0.19%
2007	4,068	+0.41%
2012	4,155	+0.42%
2017	4,171	+0.08%
2023	4,239	+0.27%
Source: INSEE

== Breton language ==
The municipality launched a linguistic plan concerning the Breton language through Ya d'ar brezhoneg on 3 July 2008.

== See also ==
- Communes of the Finistère department
- Buckwheat whisky, produced in Plomelin by Distillerie des Menhirs.
